= 2012 Washington Redskins season =

NFL team season

- Owner: Daniel Snyder
- General manager: Bruce Allen
- Head coach: Mike Shanahan
- Offensive coordinator: Kyle Shanahan
- Defensive coordinator: Jim Haslett
- Home stadium: FedExField

Results
- Record: 10–6
- Division place: 1st NFC East
- Playoffs: Lost Wild Card Playoffs (vs. Seahawks) 14–24
- Pro Bowlers: QB Robert Griffin III; OT Trent Williams; LB Lorenzo Alexander; LB London Fletcher; LB Ryan Kerrigan

Uniform
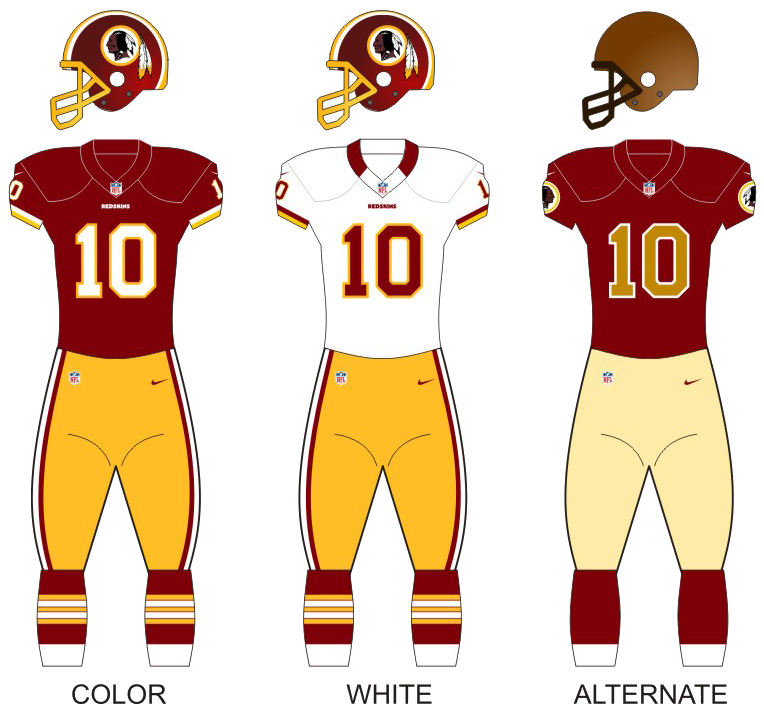

The 2012 season was the Washington Redskins' 81st in the National Football League (NFL) and their 76th representing Washington, D.C. Their home games were played at FedExField in Landover, Maryland for the 16th consecutive season. It was the third season for head coach Mike Shanahan.

After initially starting the season 3–6, the Redskins rebounded after their bye week by winning their remaining seven games, improving on their 5–11 record from the 2011 season, and ending the regular season with a 10–6 record, leading to a NFC East division championship and a 4th seed spot in the playoffs. It was their first division title since 1999. The Redskins lost in the wild card round to the Seattle Seahawks, ending their season but marking the team's first playoff appearance since the end of the 2007 season (in which the Redskins also lost the wild card game to the Seahawks). This would be the last season with 10 or more wins until 2024. This was also the last time the Redskins would win 10 games under this name. The next time they won 10 games in 2024, they would be called by their current name, the Commanders. Their .625 winning percentage was their best since 2005.

The Redskins ranked #1 in the league in rushing yards for the 2012 season. Robert Griffin III's 815 rushing yards and Alfred Morris's 1,613 rushing yards accounted for 90% of the Redskins rushing yards for 2012.

== Draft ==
2012 Washington Redskins draft
Round	Selection	Player	Position	College
1	2^{[a]}	Robert Griffin III	Quarterback	Baylor
2	39^{[a]}	Traded to the St. Louis Rams		
3	71^{[c]}	Josh LeRibeus	Guard	SMU
4	102	Kirk Cousins	Quarterback	Michigan State
4	109^{[b]}	Traded to the Pittsburgh Steelers		
4	119^{[f]}	Keenan Robinson	Linebacker	Texas
5	141	Adam Gettis	Guard	Iowa
6	173^{[d]}	Alfred Morris	Running back	Florida Atlantic
6	177^{[e]}	Traded to the Arizona Cardinals		
6	193^{[f]}	Tom Compton	Offensive Tackle	South Dakota
7	213	Richard Crawford	Cornerback	SMU
7	217^{[c]}	Jordan Bernstine	Safety	Iowa

NOTES
^{^[a]} The team traded its original first-round selection (#6 overall), second-round selection (#39 overall) and first-round selections in 2013 (#22 overall) and 2014 (#2 overall) to the St. Louis Rams in exchange for the Rams' first-round selection (#2 overall).

^{^[b]} The team acquired an additional fourth-round selection in a trade that sent QB Jason Campbell to the Oakland Raiders.

^{^[c]} The team traded its original third round selection (#69 overall) to the Buffalo Bills for its 3rd round (#71 overall) and its 7th round selections (#217 overall).

^{^[d]} The team acquired a new sixth-round selection (#173 overall) and a 2013 sixth-round selection in a trade that sent QB Donovan McNabb to the Minnesota Vikings.

^{^[e]} The team traded its original sixth-round selection (#177 overall) and DE Vonnie Holliday to the Arizona Cardinals in exchange for RB Tim Hightower.

^{^[f]} The team traded the fourth-round pick acquired from the Oakland Raiders (#109 overall) to the Pittsburgh Steelers for its fourth-round (#119 overall) and its sixth-round (#193 overall) selections.

== Personnel ==
=== Staff / Coaches ===
2012 Washington Redskins staff
Front office: Owner – Daniel Snyder; General manager – Bruce Allen; Executive vice president – Mike Shanahan; Vice president of football administration – Eric Shaffer; Director of player personnel – Scott Campbell; Director of pro personnel – Morocco Brown; Head coaches: Head coach – Mike Shanahan; Assistant head coach/running backs – Bobby Turner; Offensive coaches: Offensive coordinator – Kyle Shanahan; Quarterbacks – Matt LaFleur; Wide receivers – Ike Hilliard; Tight ends – Sean McVay; Offensive line – Chris Foerster; Assistant offensive line – Chris Morgan; Offensive assistant – Mike McDaniel; Offensive coaching assistant – Richmond Flowers III	Defensive coaches: Defensive coordinator – Jim Haslett; Defensive line – Jacob Burney; Linebackers – Bob Slowik; Defensive backs – Raheem Morris; Assistant defensive backs/special teams assistant – Richard Hightower; Defensive assistant – Bobby Slowik; Special teams coaches: Special teams coordinator – Danny Smith; Strength and conditioning: Director of player development – Phillip Daniels; Head strength and conditioning – Ray Wright; Assistant strength and conditioning – Chad Englehart

=== Final roster ===
2012 Washington Redskins roster
Quarterbacks (QB): 12 Kirk Cousins; 10 Robert Griffin III; 8 Rex Grossman; Running backs (RB): 46 Alfred Morris; 22 Evan Royster; 25 Keiland Williams; 36 Darrel Young FB; Wide receivers (WR): 16 Brandon Banks; 19 Dezmon Briscoe; 88 Pierre Garçon; 85 Leonard Hankerson; 15 Josh Morgan; 89 Santana Moss; 11 Aldrick Robinson; Tight ends (TE): 47 Chris Cooley; 84 Niles Paul; 82 Logan Paulsen	Offensive linemen (OL): 66 Chris Chester G; 68 Tom Compton T; 73 Adam Gettis G; 79 Maurice Hurt G/T; 67 Josh LeRibeus C; 78 Kory Lichtensteiger G; 63 Will Montgomery C; 74 Tyler Polumbus T; 71 Trent Williams T; Defensive linemen (DL): 92 Chris Baker NT; 72 Stephen Bowen DE; 96 Barry Cofield NT; 64 Kedric Golston DE; 99 Jarvis Jenkins DE; 90 Doug Worthington DE	Linebackers (LB): 97 Lorenzo Alexander OLB; 59 London Fletcher ILB; 50 Rob Jackson OLB; 53 Bryan Kehl ILB; 91 Ryan Kerrigan OLB; 55 Roddrick Muckelroy ILB; 56 Perry Riley ILB; 58 Vic So'oto OLB; 51 Chris Wilson OLB; Defensive backs (DB): 39 Richard Crawford CB; 37 Reed Doughty SS; 24 DeJon Gomes SS; 23 DeAngelo Hall CB; 30 D. J. Johnson CB; 45 Jerome Murphy CB; 32 Jordan Pugh FS; 41 Madieu Williams FS; 26 Josh Wilson CB; Special teams (ST): 2 Kai Forbath K; 6 Sav Rocca P; 57 Nick Sundberg LS	Practice squad: 75 Chigbo Anunoby NT; 61 Pat Boyle G; 76 Dominique Hamilton DE; 35 Buddy Jackson CB; 40 Eric Kettani FB; 22 Korey Lindsey CB; 87 DeAngelo Peterson TE; 34 Javarris Williams RB; Reserve: 48 Jordan Bernstine SS (IR); 60 Jordan Black T (Susp.); -- Dorson Boyce FB (IR); 77 Jammal Brown T (PUP); 94 Adam Carriker DE (IR); 83 Fred Davis TE (IR); 38 Tristan Davis RB (IR); 20 Cedric Griffin SS (Susp.); 17 Darius Hanks WR (IR); 29 Roy Helu RB (IR); -- Tanard Jackson FS (Susp.); 31 Brandon Meriweather SS (IR); -- Chase Minnifield CB (IR); 95 Chris Neild NT (IR); 98 Brian Orakpo OLB (IR); 52 Keenan Robinson ILB (IR); Rookies in italics 53 active, 16 reserve, 8 practice squad

== Schedule ==
=== Preseason ===
Week	Date	Opponent	Result	Record	Venue	Recap
1	August 9	at Buffalo Bills	**W** 7–6	1–0	Ralph Wilson Stadium	Recap
2	August 18	at Chicago Bears	**L** 31–33	1–1	Soldier Field	Recap
3	August 25	Indianapolis Colts	**W** 30–17	2–1	FedExField	Recap
4	August 29	Tampa Bay Buccaneers	**W** 30–3	3–1	FedExField	Recap

=== Regular season ===
Week	Date	Opponent	Result	Record	Venue	Recap
1	September 9	at New Orleans Saints	**W** 40–32	1–0	Mercedes-Benz Superdome	Recap
2	September 16	at St. Louis Rams	**L** 28–31	1–1	Edward Jones Dome	Recap
3	September 23	Cincinnati Bengals	**L** 31–38	1–2	FedExField	Recap
4	September 30	at Tampa Bay Buccaneers	**W** 24–22	2–2	Raymond James Stadium	Recap
5	October 7	Atlanta Falcons	**L** 17–24	2–3	FedExField	Recap
6	October 14	Minnesota Vikings	**W** 38–26	3–3	FedExField	Recap
7	October 21	at **New York Giants**	**L** 23–27	3–4	MetLife Stadium	Recap
8	October 28	at Pittsburgh Steelers	**L** 12–27	3–5	Heinz Field	Recap
9	November 4	Carolina Panthers	**L** 13–21	3–6	FedExField	Recap
10	Bye					
11	November 18	**Philadelphia Eagles**	**W** 31–6	4–6	FedExField	Recap
12	November 22	at **Dallas Cowboys**	**W** 38–31	5–6	Cowboys Stadium	Recap
13	December 3	**New York Giants**	**W** 17–16	6–6	FedExField	Recap
14	December 9	Baltimore Ravens	**W** 31–28 (OT)	7–6	FedExField	Recap
15	December 16	at Cleveland Browns	**W** 38–21	8–6	Cleveland Browns Stadium	Recap
16	December 23	at **Philadelphia Eagles**	**W** 27–20	9–6	Lincoln Financial Field	Recap
17	December 30	**Dallas Cowboys**	**W** 28–18	10–6	FedExField	Recap

Note: Intra-division opponents are in bold text.

=== Postseason ===
Round	Date	Opponent (seed)	Result	Record	Venue	Recap
Wild Card	January 6	Seattle Seahawks (5)	**L** 14–24	0–1	FedExField	Recap

== Game summaries ==
=== Regular season ===
==== Week 1 ====
Washington Redskins at New Orleans Saints

Team	1	2	3	4	Total
• Redskins	10	10	10	10	40
Saints	7	7	3	15	32

- Date: September 9
- Location: Mercedes-Benz Superdome, New Orleans, Louisiana
- Game start: 1:00 p.m. EST
- Game attendance: 72,180
- Game weather: indoors (dome)
- Referee: David Scott
- TV announcers (Fox): Kenny Albert, Daryl Johnston, and Tony Siragusa

Scoring summary
1	7:05	WSH	Billy Cundiff 37-yard field goal	Redskins 3–0
1	3:49	NO	Jimmy Graham 20-yard pass from Drew Brees (Garrett Hartley kick)	Saints 7–3
1	3:28	WSH	Pierre Garçon 88-yard pass from Robert Griffin III (Billy Cundiff kick)	Redskins 10–7
2	11:33	WSH	Aldrick Robinson 5-yard pass from Robert Griffin III (Billy Cundiff kick)	Redskins 17–7
2	6:08	WSH	Billy Cundiff 41-yard field goal	Redskins 20–7
2	:40	NO	Courtney Roby 4-yard blocked punt return (Garrett Hartley kick)	Redskins 20–14
3	11:24	WSH	Alfred Morris 1-yard run (Billy Cundiff kick)	Redskins 27–14
3	7:10	WSH	Billy Cundiff 37-yard field goal	Redskins 30–14
3	1:50	NO	Garrett Hartley 21-yard field goal	Redskins 30–17
4	10:59	WSH	Billy Cundiff 45-yard field goal	Redskins 33–17
4	6:19	NO	Lance Moore 33-yard pass from Drew Brees (Darren Sproles run)	Redskins 33–25
4	3:18	WSH	Alfred Morris 3-yard run (Billy Cundiff kick)	Redskins 40–25
4	2:25	NO	Darren Sproles 2-yard pass from Drew Brees (Garrett Hartley kick)	Redskins 40–32

The Redskins opened their 2012 season on the road, marking the much-anticipated debut of Robert Griffin III, the second overall pick in the 2012 NFL draft. Griffin started his career as well as possible, going 6/6 on his opening possession, setting up a 37-yard field goal by new Redskins kicker Billy Cundiff. However, the lead would be short lived as Six-time Pro Bowl QB Drew Brees marched his Saints down the field, culminating in a 20-yard touchdown pass to star tight end Jimmy Graham. For the first time, Griffin's resolve was tested, as he marched onto the field trailing for the first time. Griffin was unfazed, and after not completing a pass ahead of the line of scrimmage on his first possession, Griffin connected with fellow new Redskins Pierre Garçon for an 88-yard strike to give Washington a 10–7 lead.

In the second quarter, Washington's lead continued to grow, as Griffin found second-year man Aldrick Robinson for a 5-yard touchdown pass to extend Washington's advantage to 17–7. Cundiff added a 41-yard field goal to give Washington a 20–7 advantage. On the next Saints ensuing possession, Brees found Marques Colston who was on his way to an apparent touchdown, but fumbled in the Washington end zone, which resulted in a touchback. Appearing to go into the second half up 20–7, Saverio Rocca's punt was blocked and returned four yards for a touchdown by Saints special teamer Courtney Roby to make it 20–14 at the half.

Getting the ball to start the second half, Washington extended its advantage by way of a 1-yard rush TD by rookie running back Alfred Morris. Washington would again expand upon its lead via Cundiff's 37-yarder, to make it 30–14 Washington. Saints kicker Garrett Hartley hit a 21-yard field goal to close the third quarter scoring at 30–17.

In the fourth, Washington again pushed its advantage to 16 when Billy Cundiff nailed his fourth field goal of the day, this one from 45 yards. However, the Saints would not go quietly. On the Saints' ensuing possession, Brian Orakpo dropped an interception on 3rd and 10 that would have all but sealed the deal. With this new break, Brees made the Redskins pay, as Lance Moore beat Madieu Williams to the end zone for a 33-yard touchdown on 4th-and-10. Darren Sproles scored on the two-point conversion to cut the Redskins lead to 33–25.

The Redskins could not amass a first down on their next drive, and Drew Brees got the ball back with the crowd sensing a comeback. However, Brees overthrew his intended receiver on the first play of the drive, and DeJon Gomes returned the interception to the Saints 3-yard line, and on the next play, Alfred Morris extended the advantage to 40–25. However, the Saints continued to battle. It took Brees less than one minute to march New Orleans down the field and find Darren Sproles for a 2-yard touchdown pass, and the Saints again pulled within 8. The Redskins got the ball back and were able to nearly run out the clock, but gave Brees one last chance. However, Brees' Hail Mary pass on the final play of the game fell short of the intended target and was intercepted by Reed Doughty to preserve the 40–32 upset win.

With the win, the Redskins began the season 1–0. Robert Griffin III became the first rookie QB to throw for 300 yards in his debut game and win the game.

This was the first game in league history to end with a score of 40 to 32.

==== Week 2 ====
Washington Redskins at St. Louis Rams

Team	1	2	3	4	Total
Redskins	14	7	7	0	28
• Rams	3	13	7	8	31

- Date: September 16
- Location: Edward Jones Dome, St. Louis, Missouri
- Game start: 4:05 p.m. EST
- Game attendance: 53,979
- Game weather: indoors (dome)
- Referee: Wayne Elliott
- TV announcers (Fox): Chris Myers, Tim Ryan, and Jaime Maggio

Coming off their upset win over the New Orleans Saints, the Redskins continued their road trip and traveled to the Edward Jones Dome to meet the St. Louis Rams for a 5th consecutive season, and for the third consecutive season in St. Louis. The Redskins started the game very well with Josh Wilson recovering a Danny Amendola fumble and returning it to the end zone for a 7–0 Redskins lead on the first snap of the game. St. Louis would fight back, however, and pick up a Greg Zuerlein 39-yard field goal to cut the Redskins advantage to 7–3. Washington would close the first quarter with a Robert Griffin III touchdown run to give the Redskins a 14–3 lead going into the second quarter.

In the second, St. Louis continued to battle, as Zuerlein hit another field goal. However, on the Redskins' ensuing possession, Griffin III connected with Leonard Hankerson for a 68-yard strike on a play action pass, and the Redskins appeared to take firm control, with a 21–6 edge. However, St. Louis would prove resilient, led by Danny Amendola's 12 receptions in the first half, St. Louis pulled within 8 when Sam Bradford found the aforementioned Amendola to cut the Redskins' advantage to 21–13. Then, just before the half, Griffin threw his first career interception to Cortland Finnegan which set up Zuerlein's 42-yard field goal as the half ended to cut the lead to 21–16.

In the third, momentum continued to swing St. Louis' way as Bradford found a wide-open Brandon Gibson to give St. Louis its first advantage of the game. Griffin III continued to amaze as he found the end zone for a second time on the ground, and Washington ended the third quarter up 28–23. However, late in the third, for the second straight week, a Saverio Rocca punt was blocked, this time by St. Louis tight end Matthew Mulligan.

To open the fourth, Bradford found Mulligan, and rookie Daryl Richardson scampered into the end zone for the two-point conversion, and St. Louis led 31–28. Washington was unable to get into position to tie the game, but had an opportunity late when Richardson fumbled and DeJon Gomes picked it up to give Washington the ball with less than three minutes to play. Washington drove the ball to the St. Louis 29, which would have set up a 46-yard field goal attempt by Billy Cundiff, but Josh Morgan was flagged for unsportsmanlike conduct after he threw the ball at Cortland Finnegan, moving Washington back to the St. Louis 46, and making it a 62-yard field goal. Cundiff's attempt was wide right and well short of the distance, and St. Louis held on for the 31–28 win.

With the loss, the Redskins fell to 1–1. Also, Washington fell to 2–3 in their last five games against St. Louis, dating back the 2008 NFL season. In that time, the Rams have compiled a 13–53 overall record.

==== Week 3 ====
Cincinnati Bengals at Washington Redskins

Team	1	2	3	4	Total
• Bengals	14	10	0	14	38
Redskins	7	3	14	7	31

- Date: September 23
- Location: FedExField, Landover, Maryland
- Game start: 1:00 p.m. EST
- Game attendance: 80,060
- Game weather: 65 °F (18 °C), Sunny
- Referee: Matt Nicks
- TV announcers (CBS): Kevin Harlan and Solomon Wilcots

Scoring summary
1	14:43	CIN	A. J. Green 73-yard pass from Mohamed Sanu (Mike Nugent kick)	Bengals 7–0
1	11:00	WSH	Rob Jackson interception in end zone (Billy Cundiff kick)	Tie 7–7
1	3:28	CIN	Armon Binns 48-yard pass from Andy Dalton (Mike Nugent kick)	Bengals 14–7
2	4:36	CIN	Mike Nugent 47-yard field goal	Bengals 17–7
2	3:13	CIN	BenJarvus Green-Ellis 1-yard run (Mike Nugent kick)	Bengals 24–7
2	:31	WSH	Billy Cundiff 36-yard field goal	Bengals 24–10
3	10:23	WSH	Alfred Morris 7-yard run (Billy Cundiff kick)	Bengals 24–17
3	3:29	WSH	Santana Moss 3-yard pass from Robert Griffin III (Billy Cundiff kick)	Tie 24–24
4	11:24	CIN	Jermaine Gresham 6-yard pass from Andy Dalton (Mike Nugent kick)	Bengals 31–24
4	7:08	CIN	Andrew Hawkins 59-yard pass from Andy Dalton (Mike Nugent kick)	Bengals 38–24
4	3:35	WSH	Robert Griffin III 2-yard run (Billy Cundiff kick)	Bengals 38–31

Hoping to rebound from their road upset against the St. Louis Rams, the Redskins returned to FedExField in an attempt to win its sixth straight home opener and, simultaneously, snap a 6-game home losing streak, the longest such streak in the NFL currently.

Right out of the gate, things started off on the wrong foot for the Redskins, as the Bengals attempted a trick play on the first play of the game, and executed it to perfection, as rookie wide receiver Mohamed Sanu took the snap and found a wide-open A. J. Green for a 73-yard touchdown pass on the first play of the game to make it 7–0 Bengals. The Redskins would go three-and-out on its next possession, but punter Saverio Rocca would pin the Bengals deep in their own end, and on the ensuing play, Bengals QB Andy Dalton, under duress in his own end zone, threw a pass too wide for running back BenJarvus Green-Ellis, which was intercepted by linebacker Rob Jackson in the end zone for a Redskins touchdown, evening the score at 7 apiece. However, the Bengals would continue to set the tone offensively, as Dalton would find Armon Binns on the sideline for a 48-yard score to take a 14–7 lead.

In the second quarter, Cincinnati continued to dictate the flow of the game, and things began to look grim for the Redskins in Robert Griffin III's home debut. Late in the second, Mike Nugent connected on a 37-yard field goal to extend Cincinnati's advantage to 17–7. Less than a minute later, Cincinnati recovered a Griffin III fumble, and BenJarvus Green-Ellis would score on a direct snap from one yard out to put Cincinnati in firm control, up 24–7. However, Washington refused to give up, as they drove down the field, and Billy Cundiff connected from 36 yards out to bring Washington back within two possessions, down 24–10.

In the second half, Washington got the ball to start the third quarter, and wasted no time. Rookie Alfred Morris scored from 7 yards out, and the deficit was cut to 24–17. Later, Cincinnati went 3-and-out, and Washington would rally to tie the game, with Griffin finding Santana Moss in the corner of the end zone to even the score at 24 apiece, in a game in which Washington seemed destined to lose earlier in the day.

In the fourth, however, Washington's defense could not sustain. After squandering solid field position twice, and being out of timeouts with over twelve minutes to play in the fourth, Dalton found Jermaine Gresham for a 6-yard TD to put the Bengals back on top, 31–24. The Redskins again went 3-and-out, and Dalton this time found speedy Andrew Hawkins for a 59-yard touchdown pass to give Cincinnati a 38–24 advantage. Washington, however, again refused to give in. Griffin III scored on a 2-yard touchdown run to cut the lead to 38–31, and after Washington's defense forced a punt, Griffin began with the ball at his own 1-yard line, down 7, with no timeouts. Attempting to recreate The Drive nearly worked, as the Redskins got to the Bengals 20, but Griffin III was then sacked for a sixth time on the day, and a third time by Michael Johnson, and the Redskins were then flagged for a false start and an unsportsmanlike conduct penalty, making the once highly plausible last-second TD pass nothing short of a miracle. Griffin III threw up a prayer that fell incomplete as time expired, and Washington lost 38–31.

With the loss, the Redskins fell to 1–2 and sole possession of last place in the NFC East. They also set a mark for five consecutive games in which their defense allowed 30 or more points, dating back to the 2011 season. This is also the first time the Redskins have dropped a home opener since 2006, making this their seventh consecutive home loss.

==== Week 4 ====
Washington Redskins at Tampa Bay Buccaneers

Team	1	2	3	4	Total
• Redskins	7	14	0	3	24
Buccaneers	3	3	7	9	22

- Date: September 30
- Location: Raymond James Stadium, Tampa, Florida
- Game start: 4:25 p.m. EST
- Game attendance: 58,191
- Game weather: 89 °F (32 °C), Sunny
- Referee: Alberto Riveron
- TV announcers (Fox): Chris Myers, Tim Ryan, and Krista Voda

Looking to snap a two-game losing streak, the Redskins traveled to Raymond James Stadium for a duel with the Tampa Bay Buccaneers. The Redskins had not won in Tampa Bay since the 2006 playoff game in which they gained less than 150 yards.

In the first quarter, Tampa Bay struck first, with kicker Connor Barth nailing a 50-yard field goal to give Tampa a 3–0 lead. On the ensuing drive, Washington responded by quarterback Robert Griffin III running a quarterback draw, but fumbling in the end zone. However, Redskins wide receiver Pierre Garçon pounced on it, and gave Washington a 7–3 edge as time expired in the first quarter.

In the second quarter, Washington continued to increase its lead, as Griffin III scored on what was this time a successful quarterback draw, and Washington extended its advantage to 14–3. After a Tampa Bay punt, Washington was able to convert again as Florida Atlantic rookie running back Alfred Morris scored on a 39-yard run to put Washington firmly in control at 21–3. Near halftime, Barth would hit a 57-yard field goal to bring Tampa Bay back within 2 scores, at 21–6.

In the third quarter, Washington's much-maligned defense through the first three games began to fall back into the same patterns. Josh Freeman began to find open receivers, including bombs to Vincent Jackson and Mike Williams, to set Tampa Bay up in the red zone. Freeman would find Jackson for a 7-yard score, and Tampa cut the deficit to 21–13.

In the fourth, with an opportunity to take a 2-possession lead, Redskins kicker Billy Cundiff missed his third field goal of the day, this one from a mere 31 yards, and Washington all of a sudden was in a nail-biter. Freeman and the Buccaneer passing game continued to find its rhythm, and concluded the ensuing drive with a 2-yard run up the gut by LeGarrette Blount. However, Washington would retain the lead thanks to a failed two-point conversion attempt, at 21–19. Washington could not sustain a drive, and gave the ball back to the now-clicking Tampa Bay offense. Tampa Bay got down the field, and Barth made his third long field goal of the day, to give Tampa Bay a 22–21 advantage with 1:42 to play. Washington would have one more chance, as Griffin III had his third chance in as many weeks to mount a comeback. With his headset malfunctioning, Griffin was left to fend for himself, and he was able to. With mere seconds to go, Griffin scrambled to the Tampa Bay 25, giving Billy Cundiff, who had gone 0-for-3 on field goals for the day, a chance for redemption and, quite possibly, a chance to save his job. This time, Cundiff delivered, squeezing the ball inside the upright for the 41-yard field goal with only 3 seconds to go, and Washington escaped, 24–22, when Tampa Bay's lateral drill was stopped short the end zone.

With the win, Washington improved to 2–2, and 2–0 against the NFC South.

==== Week 5 ====
Atlanta Falcons at Washington Redskins

Team	1	2	3	4	Total
• Falcons	0	7	0	17	24
Redskins	0	7	3	7	17

- Date: October 7
- Location: FedExField, Landover, Maryland
- Game start: 1:00 p.m. EST
- Game attendance: 75,337
- Game weather: 52 °F (11 °C), Cloudy
- Referee: Bill Leavy
- TV announcers (Fox): Sam Rosen, John Lynch, and Jennifer Hale

Looking to be over .500 for the second time this season, Washington returned home to face the 4–0 Atlanta Falcons, in hopes of snapping a seven-game home losing streak, as well as, as previously mentioned, be over .500 for the first time since Week 1.

A game that was billed to be a game with much offense, and little defense, ironically had the script flipped on its head. In the first quarter, neither team was able to threaten the other, and the teams played to a scoreless tie, with both teams struggling to get the offense in its normal rhythm.

In the second quarter, Falcons quarterback Matt Ryan threw an interception to Redskins linebacker Ryan Kerrigan who returned it for a Redskins touchdown. After an Atlanta three-and-out, Washington got into the red zone, but Redskins kicker Billy Cundiff, who had missed three field goals the week before in Tampa Bay, shanked one from 31 yards out, and Washington was unable to build upon its advantage. Subsequently, the Falcons got the ball back, and Matt Ryan was able to find legendary tight end Tony Gonzalez to even the score at 7–7.

In the third, defenses continued to set the tone. On its second possession of the second half, Washington moved the ball effectively into the red zone. However, on third down, Redskins quarterback Robert Griffin III scrambled to the left, slid down, and was hit hard by Falcons linebacker Sean Weatherspoon, and left the game with a concussion, and did not return. Cundiff gave Washington a 10–7 advantage by booting a 23-yard field goal, but Washington's main concern now was the health of their quarterback.

In the fourth, Washington's defense, who had been on the field far more than it had been off, began to wear down. Matt Ryan found Julio Jones in the corner of the end zone to give Atlanta its first advantage of the day, at 14–10. However, the Redskins, in spite of an injured Griffin, fought back. Fellow rookie Kirk Cousins entered the game and, on 3rd-and-9, found a wide-open Santana Moss for a 77-yard strike to put Washington back in the lead, at 17–14. On Atlanta's ensuing possession, veteran kicker Matt Bryant evened the score at 17-all. After a Washington punt, Ryan got the ball back. With a now-exhausted Redskins defense on the field again, Ryan picked the Redskins defense apart, then watched his running back, Michael Turner gash Washington and reach the end zone, and gave Atlanta a 24–17 lead. On Washington's ensuing possession, they were able to get to Atlanta's side of the field, but Cousins showed his rookie colors, stared down a receiver, and veteran cornerback Dunta Robinson made him pay, intercepting him. After Washington's defense stood tall, Washington got one final chance at tying the game. However, Cousins was intercepted again on its first play of the ensuing drive, this time by Thomas DeCoud, sealing the win for Atlanta. Atlanta improved to 5–0.

With the loss, Washington fell to 2–3 and lost their eighth consecutive home game. They have not won at home since their Week 2 win over the Arizona Cardinals last season.

After the game, Washington was fined $20,000 for not updating Robert Griffin III's status.

==== Week 6 ====
Minnesota Vikings at Washington Redskins

Team	1	2	3	4	Total
Vikings	9	0	3	14	26
• Redskins	0	17	7	14	38

- Date: October 14
- Location: FedExField, Landover, Maryland
- Game start: 4:25 p.m. EST
- Game attendance: 78,476
- Game weather: 74 °F (23 °C), Sunny
- Referee: Tony Corrente
- TV announcers (Fox): Dick Stockton, John Lynch, and Jennifer Hale

After their loss to Atlanta, Washington hosted the Minnesota Vikings, looking to snap an 8-game home losing streak.

The first quarter was dominated by the Vikings, as they reached the red zone three times and intercepted Redskins quarterback Robert Griffin III. However, the Redskins defense was able to stiffen in the red zone, holding the Vikings to three Blair Walsh field goals of 20, 27, and 27 yards, to give the Vikings a 9–0 advantage after one quarter.

In the second, Washington finally was able to sustain a drive. The Redskins drive stalled at the Vikings' 33-yard line, however, and new Redskins kicker Kai Forbath got his first NFL opportunity, having replaced Billy Cundiff, who was cut earlier in the week, and delivered a 50-yard boot to trim the deficit to 9–3. After a Vikings three-and-out, Washington was able to run an 11-play drive that gave it its first advantage of the game, as Alfred Morris scored on a 1-yard run and gave Washington a 10–9 lead. On Minnesota's ensuing possession, Vikings quarterback Christian Ponder was sacked, fumbled, and the fumble was subsequently recovered by Lorenzo Alexander of Washington, setting the Redskins up at the Vikings 6. Robert Griffin III then found fullback Darrel Young for a 6-yard touchdown pass, extending the Redskins advantage to 17–9.

In the third, Washington continued imposing its will, as they drove down the field again, this time culminating in a Robert Griffin III touchdown run, his fifth rushing touchdown of the year, setting a Washington Redskins record for rushing touchdowns by a Redskins QB and extending the Washington advantage to 24–9. The Vikings would not back down, though, and Blair Walsh connected again, this time from 37 yards, his fourth field goal on the day, to cut into the lead, and make it 24–12.

In the fourth, the Vikings possessed the ball, but Ponder threw an interception straight into the waiting arms of Redskins free safety Madieu Williams, who returned it 24 yards to put the game nearly on ice, at 31–12 Washington. The Vikings, however, proved resilient. On their ensuing drive, the Vikings found the end zone for the first time on the day, with Ponder finding wide receiver Michael Jenkins for a 9-yard score. Ponder subsequently found Kyle Rudolph on a successful two-point conversion attempt, and the Redskins lead was cut to 31–20. After Washington could not extend its advantage, Minnesota got the ball back. Once again, Minnesota scored, this time Ponder found Rudolph to cut the lead to 31–26. This time, however, the two-point conversion came up short, meaning Minnesota would again need to score a touchdown to complete its rally. However, Washington's rookie QB would see to it that no comeback would be complete on his team on this day, as Griffin, on 3rd-and-6 from his own 24, found a seam on a designed quarterback draw, and raced down the sideline for a 76-yard touchdown run, the longest such rush TD by a QB since Kordell Stewart scrambled for an 80-yard score against the Carolina Panthers in the 1996 season. With the score now 38–26 Redskins, the Vikings tried to rally again, and were able to reach the Redskins' goal line. However, with less than a half minute remaining, DeAngelo Hall intercepted Christian Ponder, to officially preserve the 38–26 win.

With the win, Washington improved to 3–3, snapped an 8-game home losing streak, and will have an opportunity to take first place in the NFC East with a victory over the defending Super Bowl XLVI champion New York Giants next week.

==== Week 7 ====
Washington Redskins at New York Giants

Team	1	2	3	4	Total
Redskins	3	10	0	10	23
• Giants	0	13	0	14	27

- Date: October 21
- Location: MetLife Stadium, East Rutherford, New Jersey
- Game start: 1:00 p.m. EST
- Game attendance: 81,352
- Game weather: 61 °F (16 °C), Mostly sunny
- Referee: Ed Hochuli
- TV announcers (Fox): Thom Brennaman, Troy Aikman, and Pam Oliver

Scoring summary
1	2:13	WSH	Kai Forbath 20-yard field goal	Redskins 3–0
2	12:41	NYG	Andre Brown 1-yard run (Lawrence Tynes kick)	Giants 7–3
2	8:45	WSH	Santana Moss 26-yard pass from Robert Griffin III (Kai Forbath kick)	Redskins 10–7
2	3:53	NYG	Lawrence Tynes 27-yard field goal	Tie 10–10
2	1:49	WSH	Kai Forbath 43-yard field goal	Redskins 13–10
2	:02	NYG	Lawrence Tynes 39-yard field goal	Tie 13–13
4	12:55	NYG	Ahmad Bradshaw 1-yard run (Lawrence Tynes kick)	Giants 20–13
4	5:21	WSH	Kai Forbath 45-yard field goal	Giants 20–16
4	1:32	WSH	Santana Moss 30-yard pass from Robert Griffin III (Kai Forbath kick)	Redskins 23–20
4	1:13	NYG	Victor Cruz 77-yard pass from Eli Manning (Lawrence Tynes kick)	Giants 27–23

Looking to take sole possession of first place in the NFC East, the Redskins traveled to MetLife Stadium to take on their division rival, the Super Bowl champion New York Giants.

In a first quarter dominated by the Redskins, Washington ran a drive that chewed up over half the quarter, but were only able to muster a Kai Forbath 20-yard field goal as the drive stalled in the red zone.

In the second, the Giants would make the Redskins pay for being unable to capitalize in the red zone, as running back Andre Brown found the end zone to give the Giants a 7–3 lead. Washington would respond, however, with a 26-yard touchdown pass from rookie quarterback Robert Griffin III to veteran wide receiver Santana Moss to give Washington's advantage back, at 10–7. The Giants would again answer, as Lawrence Tynes connected from 27 yards out to even the score. Washington would respond with a 43-yard field goal from Forbath, and Tynes would again tie it from 39 yards out as time expired in the second.

Albeit a scoreless third quarter, it was an eventful quarter that culminated in turnovers for both sides. Despite these events, neither team could capitalize in the third.

In the fourth, Giants running back Ahmad Bradshaw gave the Giants a 20–13 edge. Later in the fourth, Washington was able to cut into the deficit, as Forbath connected, this time from 45 yards out, and the lead was cut to 20–16. After the Redskins were able to stop the Giants on their ensuing possession, the Redskins were able to march down the field and stun the Giants, as Robert Griffin III hit Santana Moss from 30 yards out to give Washington a 23–20 lead. However, Eli Manning's receivers bailed him out again, as he connected with a wide-open Victor Cruz for a 77-yard score to give New York its advantage back. Washington was able to get a drive going, but Santana Moss fumbled after getting into Giants territory, ending any chance of a comeback.

With the loss, Washington fell to 3–4, 0–1 in the NFC East, and to the NFC East basement.

==== Week 8 ====
Washington Redskins at Pittsburgh Steelers

Team	1	2	3	4	Total
Redskins	0	6	3	3	12
• Steelers	10	10	7	0	27

- Date: October 28
- Location: Heinz Field, Pittsburgh, Pennsylvania
- Game start: 1:00 p.m. EST
- Game attendance: 62,371
- Game weather: 45 °F (7 °C), Cloudy
- Referee: Pete Morelli
- TV announcers (Fox): Sam Rosen, Brian Billick, and Laura Okmin

Hoping to rebound from their tough loss to the Giants, the Redskins traveled to Heinz Field to take on the Pittsburgh Steelers, and attempted to improve to 1–1 against the AFC.

The Steelers marched straight down the field on Washington's defense, culminating in a fourth-and-goal 1-yard touchdown pass to backup tight end Leonard Pope from Ben Roethlisberger to give the Steelers a 7–0 lead. Following a Washington three-and-out, the Steelers got the ball back, this time scoring by way of former despised Redskins kicker Shaun Suisham nailing a 48-yard field goal to extend the Steelers' advantage to 10–0.

In the second, Washington was able to get on the board as quarterback Robert Griffin III found Santana Moss to cut into Pittsburgh's advantage 10–6. It would have been 10–7, but Kai Forbath's extra point was blocked. Pittsburgh responded with a Heath Miller 7-yard touchdown and a Suisham 27-yard field goal to give Pittsburgh a 20–6 lead at the half.

In the third, Washington drew to 20–9 on a Forbath 48-yard field goal, but Pittsburgh nearly put the game away with a Will Johnson 1-yard touchdown catch to give Pittsburgh a 27–9 lead late in the third.

In the fourth, Washington tried to rally as Forbath connected again, this time from 45 yards, but Washington could not score again, as a myriad of dropped passes and a turnover on downs with just over four minutes remaining sealed their fate, as the final score remained 27–12.

With the loss, Washington fell to 3–5, and 0–2 against the AFC. Washington has now lost 6 straight games to AFC opponents and has not beaten an AFC team since Week 16 of the 2010 season. During the game, DeAngelo Hall was ejected from the game after using profanity at the officials and was given a fine by the NFL.

==== Week 9 ====
Carolina Panthers at Washington Redskins

Team	1	2	3	4	Total
• Panthers	7	7	0	7	21
Redskins	3	0	3	7	13

- Date: November 4
- Location: FedExField, Landover, Maryland
- Game start: 1:00 p.m. EST
- Game attendance: 79,767
- Game weather: 50 °F (10 °C), Sunny
- Referee: Carl Cheffers
- TV announcers (Fox): Kenny Albert, Daryl Johnston, and Tony Siragusa

Looking to snap a two-game losing streak, Washington traveled home two days before the 2012 presidential election to take on the Carolina Panthers in a game that was dubbed a homecoming game for them, with past superstars being honored and wearing throwback jerseys from their 1937 season.

The Redskins got on the board first with a Kai Forbath 47-yard field goal, but Carolina countered with a DeAngelo Williams 30-yard score that was aided by an inadvertent whistle by the referee. Upon review, the call stood, and Carolina led 7–3. On Washington's ensuing possession, Washington got down to Carolina's 2, but were stuffed on fourth-and-goal, and Carolina took over on downs. Carolina was able to move the ball efficiently on Washington's much-maligned and porous defense, culminating in a Cam Newton 19-yard TD pass to Steve Smith, giving Carolina a 14–3 halftime advantage.

In the second half, Washington continued to stay within striking distance, but was unable to make enough plays to get over the hump. Forbath chipped in a 25-yard field goal to cut the score to 14–6.

In the fourth, Carolina pulled away. Pinned inside their 10, Newton found a wide-open Armanti Edwards for an 82-yard completion, and capped off the drive with a 1-yard touchdown run to take a 21–6 lead. Washington would respond later in the game by way of an Evan Royster 2-yard touchdown run, but with only 1:28 left in the game, and only two timeouts, Washington did not recover the onside kick. Following a Carolina three-and-out, Washington got the ball back with 18 seconds to go, but Brandon Banks was tackled in bounds at his own 9-yard line, and with no time outs, the clock ran out.

With the loss, Washington fell to 3–6, 1–3 at home, and the Redskins Rule stated that Mitt Romney would win the election. This proved, however, not to be the case, and only the second time the Rule did not apply. The Redskins have now lost 9 of their past 10 home games dating back to last season, one home short of matching the Eagles' streak of 10 straight home losses.

==== Week 11 ====
Philadelphia Eagles at Washington Redskins

Team	1	2	3	4	Total
Eagles	0	3	3	0	6
• Redskins	7	10	7	7	31

- Date: November 18
- Location: FedExField, Landover, Maryland
- Game start: 1:00 p.m. EST
- Game attendance: 79,327
- Game weather: 52 °F (11 °C), Cloudy
- Referee: Terry McAulay
- TV announcers (Fox): Thom Brennaman, Brian Billick, and Laura Okmin

Coming off their bye, the Redskins looked to break their three-game losing streak, both in the current season and against their division rival, and owners of a five-game losing streak, the Philadelphia Eagles. Eagles quarterback Michael Vick was ruled out with a concussion, meaning the Eagles were forced to use rookie Nick Foles. Going into the game, the Redskins had lost to the last 8 rookie quarterbacks they faced, dating back to 2005, when they beat backup Ryan Fitzpatrick, filling in for an injured Marc Bulger for the St. Louis Rams.

In the first quarter, Philadelphia got the ball first, but on third-and-8, tight end Brent Celek could not catch Nick Foles' pass, it was batted in the air, and intercepted by DeAngelo Hall and returned to the Eagles' 9. Two plays later, Robert Griffin III found fullback Darrel Young for a 6-yard touchdown pass for a 7–0 Redskins lead. On the ensuing Eagles possession, Brandon Meriweather, playing in his first game as a Redskin due to lingering knee problems, intercepted Foles and returned it. However, Washington could not capitalize, and the first quarter ended with Philadelphia driving.

In the second, Philadelphia got on the board by way of an Alex Henery 42-yard field goal to cut the deficit to 7–3. However, Washington continued to be aggressive and take advantage of Philadelphia's struggling secondary, as Griffin III found a wide-open Aldrick Robinson for a 48-yard touchdown to extend Washington's advantage to 14–3. After forcing a Washington punt late in this first half, Eagles running back LeSean McCoy fumbled in the red zone, and Washington was able to convert the turnover into a 25-yard Kai Forbath field goal to close out the half leading 17–3.

In the third, Philadelphia tried to rally, connecting on another Henery field goal to cut the lead to 17–6. However, later in the third, Robert Griffin III would scramble for 23 yards on 3rd-and-15, then three plays later, on third-and-10, connect with Santana Moss, who was being double-covered for a 61-yard strike and a 24–6 lead.

In the fourth, Washington put the game on ice, as Griffin found Logan Paulsen on a 17-yard score, and took a 31–6 lead with 10:50 left. Philadelphia tried to cut into the deficit, but the attempts proved futile, and LeSean McCoy suffered a concussion when hit by safety Madieu Williams. The Redskins would not allow an Eagles score, and won comfortably, 31–6.

Robert Griffin III had a career day, throwing for 200 yards and four touchdowns on 14 of 15 passes, while rushing for 84 yards on 12 carries.

With the win, the Redskins improved to 4–6, snapping a 3-game losing streak. They also improved to 1–1 in the NFC East, snapping a three-game losing streak to the Eagles, having not beaten them since Donovan McNabb returned to Philadelphia and beat the Eagles, 17–12 on Oct. 3rd, 2010. Even more importantly, the Redskins defense also did not allow a touchdown for the first time since Week 3 of last season, when they lost 18–16 to Dallas on six Dan Bailey field goals. Even more importantly than that, they pulled out of the NFC East basement, and into 3rd place, with the win.

==== Week 12 ====
Washington Redskins at Dallas Cowboys

Team	1	2	3	4	Total
• Redskins	0	28	0	10	38
Cowboys	3	0	10	18	31

- Date: November 22
- Location: Cowboys Stadium, Arlington, Texas
- Game start: 4:25 p.m. EST
- Game attendance: 90,166
- Game weather: indoors (roof closed)
- Referee: Bill Leavy
- TV announcers (Fox): Joe Buck, Troy Aikman, Pam Oliver, and Erin Andrews

Coming off their win against the Eagles, the Redskins had a short turnaround and traveled to Cowboys Stadium to take on their hated rival the Dallas Cowboys for the 2012 edition of the annual Thanksgiving Day game. Washington had reason to be nervous, as they were 1–6 all-time on Thanksgiving, and 0–6 against Dallas.

In the first, Washington got the ball first, but went three-and-out. After a Sav Rocca punt, Dallas had decent field position, and quickly reached the red zone. However, Washington's defense then stiffened, and held Dallas to a Dan Bailey 30-yard field goal. The teams then exchanged punts, and the first quarter concluded without any further scoring.

In the second, Washington had the ball inside their own 35, and quarterback Robert Griffin III used a play-action pass, and found a streaking Aldrick Robinson for a 68-yard strike, and Washington took its first lead of the game, at 7–3. On Dallas' ensuing possession, Dallas moved the ball into Washington territory, but after Tony Romo completed an 11-yard pass to Dez Bryant that had Dallas in Washington territory, Redskins cornerback Josh Wilson hit him, and dislodged the football, which was subsequently recovered by safety DeJon Gomes into Dallas territory. Washington would capitalize, with their drive culminating in an Alfred Morris 1-yard touchdown run to extend Washington's advantage to 14–3. Dallas would then punt after just three plays, and Washington marched near midfield, before Griffin connected with wide receiver Pierre Garçon across the middle, and Garcon proceeded to streak to the end zone for a 59-yard score, and Washington led 21–3 with just over 2 minutes remaining in the half. Dallas would attempt to run a two-minute drill, but Romo's pass, intended for Cole Beasley was intercepted by DeAngelo Hall and returned inside the Dallas 25. With mere seconds remaining in the half, Griffin found Santana Moss in the corner of the end zone for a score, and a 28–3 halftime lead.

In the third, Dallas marched down the field on their opening possession, but the drive stalled again, and Dallas settled for another Bailey field goal, this time from 33 yards out. The majority of the rest of the quarter proved to be a defensive struggle, as Romo was intercepted again, this time by London Fletcher, but Washington could not capitalize on it. After a Rocca punt, Dallas was pinned inside their 20, but Romo connected with a wide-open Dez Bryant, who streaked 85 yards to the end zone, and before you could blink, Dallas was back in the game, at 28–13 Washington.

Going into the fourth, Washington was driving, in an attempt to extend their lead back to three scores. They would succeed in this endeavor, as Griffin found tight end Niles Paul for a 30-yard touchdown on third-and-inches, and Washington took a 35–13 lead with just under 13 minutes to go. Dallas, however, would not give up, as expected. To save time, Dallas ran a no-huddle offense, and was able to march down the field, and find Felix Jones for a 10-yard touchdown, and a subsequent quarterback draw by Romo cut the lead to 35–21 with just under 10 minutes remaining. On Washington's next possession, disaster struck. Robert Griffin III lofted a throw over the middle that he overthrew horribly, and it was easily intercepted by Charlie Peprah and returned inside the Washington 20. However, Washington's defense put Dallas into a 4th down situation, but Romo found Dez Bryant in the left corner of the end zone, and with over 8 minutes remaining, Dallas was now within a touchdown, as Washington's lead was merely 35–28. With his mettle about to be tested, Robert Griffin III led an efficient, clock-chewing drive that concluded with a Kai Forbath 48-yard field goal to extend Washington's advantage to 38–28 with just under three minutes remaining. Dallas, needing a touchdown, onside kick recovery, and field goal to send it to overtime, again marched into Washington territory, but could not get to the end zone, as Dez Bryant caught a pass in the end zone that was dislodged at the last minute by Madieu Williams, and Dallas had to settle for a 51-yard field goal by Bailey. This cut the score to 38–31, and Dallas lined up for an onside kick, needing a touchdown to tie the game, with 18 seconds remaining. However, it was recovered by DeAngelo Hall and returned to the Dallas 2, as Hall opted not to score, instead letting Robert Griffin III kneel-down to seal the deal.

Griffin went 20-for-28 for 311 yards, 4 touchdowns and 1 interception, becoming the first rookie QB in NFL history to throw 4 passing touchdowns in back-to-back games.

With the win, Washington improved to 5–6, 2–1 in the NFC East, and into second place in the NFC East by virtue of the tiebreaker over Dallas. Washington also won its first Thanksgiving game since the 1973 season, when they defeated the Detroit Lions. Washington improved to 2–6 all-time on Thanksgiving, and 1–6 against Dallas.

==== Week 13 ====
New York Giants at Washington Redskins

Team	1	2	3	4	Total
Giants	3	10	3	0	16
• Redskins	7	3	0	7	17

- Date: December 3
- Location: FedExField, Landover, Maryland
- Game start: 8:30 p.m. EST
- Game attendance: 80,246
- Game weather: 55 °F (13 °C), Partly cloudy
- Referee: Jerome Boger
- TV announcers (ESPN): Mike Tirico, Jon Gruden, and Lisa Salters

Coming off a big Thanksgiving Day win over the rival Cowboys, the Redskins returned home for a Monday Night Football duel against the NFC East-leading New York Giants, who beat them in Week 7 27–23. The team came in highly motivated: in the week leading up to the game, team officials posted signs on Redskin Park walls implying that NFL referees were biased in favor of the Giants and quoting Giants owner John Mara, in his role as head of the league's Management Council, claiming that the $36 million salary cap penalty the council imposed on the Redskins (and a smaller one for the Cowboys) for violating unwritten rules in structuring contracts for the uncapped 2010 season – many within the Redskins organization (and around the league), noting that both teams punished were in the Giants' division, believed Mara had used his NFL position for his own team's interests by weakening their rivals – was, if anything, too light, and they should have lost draft picks as well; the latter was regarded as particularly malicious, as, it would have likely nullified the trade which allowed the Redskins to draft Robert Griffin III. (The animosity ran so deep that, after the game, owner Daniel Snyder was overheard telling a team employee that "I hate those motherfuckers".)

The first quarter began with a Washington punt. The Giants then possessed the ball, but could not get to the end zone, settling for a Lawrence Tynes 39-yard field goal to give the Giants a 3–0 edge. On Washington's ensuing possession, the Redskins moved the ball quickly, and quarterback Robert Griffin III scrambled for a first down, but fumbled. Fortunately for Washington, it bounced into the waiting arms of wide receiver Josh Morgan, and Washington took a 7–3 lead, as Morgan took it 13 yards into the end zone.

The second quarter was dominated by the Giants. However, the Giants, despite long, clock-chewing drives, had a missed field goal by Tynes, and Washington then took over. Washington could not capitalize, and they gave the ball back to the Giants. The Giants then again marched down the field on Washington's much-maligned secondary, and 2-time Super Bowl MVP Eli Manning found tight end Martellus Bennett for a 4-yard score to retake the lead at 10–7. Washington ran an efficient two-minute drill, however, and evened the game on a Kai Forbath 33-yard field goal to even the score, appearing to send the game to the locker rooms tied. However, the Redskins porous secondary again got picked on, as Manning led a drive into field goal range, and Tynes connected from 40 yards out, and the Giants sent the game to halftime 13–10.

In the third, the Giants punted, and Washington ran a methodical drive, running the ball with efficiency. However, after amassing a first down, Alfred Morris fumbled, and the Giants recovered inside their own 20. The Giants again ran a strong drive down the field, but it stalled, and the Giants settled for another Tynes field goal, this time from 35 yards out, and the Giants took a 16–10 lead into the fourth.

In the fourth, Washington drove down the field, with Griffin connecting with Pierre Garçon for an 8-yard score and a 17–16 lead with 11:31 left in the game. The Giants got the ball back, but failed to score. Washington then got it back, but could not run out the clock. New York received it again, and with just under four minutes remaining, called on Steve Weatherford to punt it back to Washington. Weatherford attempted to draw a roughing the kicker penalty on Redskins linebacker Bryan Kehl, but only running into the kicker was called, and Washington got the ball back. Upon receiving possession of the ball, Griffin and Morris saw to it that the Giants would not possess the ball again, as they drove down the field, and ran out the clock, sealing the 1-point win.

With the win, Washington improved to 6–6, 3–1 in the NFC East, and one game behind the Giants who now sat at 7–5. Additionally, the third straight win is Washington's longest winning streak in a season since they won 4 straight in Weeks 2–5 of the 2008 season.

==== Week 14 ====
Baltimore Ravens at Washington Redskins

Team	1	2	3	4	OT	Total
Ravens	7	14	0	7	0	28
• Redskins	14	0	6	8	3	31

- Date: December 9
- Location: FedExField, Landover, Maryland
- Game start: 1:00 p.m. EST
- Game attendance: 81,178
- Game weather: 51 °F (11 °C), Cloudy
- Referee: John Parry
- TV announcers (CBS): Marv Albert and Rich Gannon

Following their close win against the Giants, the Redskins played an inter-conference duel with the nearby Baltimore Ravens, looking to extend their winning streak to four games, while simultaneously snapping a six-game losing streak to AFC opponents.

The Redskins possessed the ball first, and struck first, as quarterback Robert Griffin III found wide receiver Josh Morgan in the end zone for a 7–0 lead. Less than 3 minutes later, however, Ravens quarterback Joe Flacco connected with receiver Anquan Boldin to even the score at 7-all. Washington would quickly respond again, this time by way of an Alfred Morris 1-yard touchdown run.

In the second, Flacco again found Boldin, this time from 31 yards away, to even the scoring again at 14-all. On Washington's ensuing possession, Alfred Morris fumbled, Baltimore recovered, and Flacco found tight end Dennis Pitta from 19 yards out for his 3rd TD pass of the half, and the Ravens went into the halftime locker room with a 21–14 edge as Washington could not answer in the quarter.

In the third, Baltimore was able to sustain a drive, but turned the ball over in the red zone, which Washington converted into a Kai Forbath 48-yard field goal to cut the score to 21–17. Baltimore would again turn the ball over, and Washington would again convert the Ravens miscue into a Forbath field goal, this one from 49 yards away.

In the fourth, Baltimore was able to again sustain a drive, but this time did not turn the ball over, instead Ravens star running back Ray Rice found the end zone, and Baltimore took a 28–20 advantage with just over four minutes remaining. On the ensuing kickoff, new Redskins kick returner Niles Paul, filling in for a deactivated Brandon Banks, fumbled at his own 15, and the ball appeared to be recovered by Baltimore, but upon replay review, was ruled to have recovered out-of-bounds, thus possession remained with Washington. On a 2nd down play, Griffin III scrambled, but was hit by Ravens defensive lineman Haloti Ngata, and his leg snapped awkwardly. He was helped off the field, and fellow backup rookie Kirk Cousins stepped in. Cousins threw an incomplete pass intended for Pierre Garçon, but pass interference was called on Baltimore, granting Washington a first down. Griffin III then returned to the game, and got Washington into Baltimore's red zone, but had to depart again after being called for intentional grounding with under a minute remaining. Cousins stepped back in, however, and connected with Garcon for a 6-yard score with 29 seconds remaining, cutting Baltimore's advantage to 28–26. Needing a two-point conversion, Washington ran a quarterback draw, Cousins reached the end zone, and the game was even at 28-all with 29 seconds remaining. Baltimore opted to settle for overtime, and knelt down to end regulation.

In overtime, Baltimore got the ball first, and went three-and-out, punter Sam Koch then punted to Redskins punt returner Richard Crawford, who, like Paul, was filling in for a deactivated Banks. Crawford found a hole and returned the ball 64 yards. Washington then sealed the deal when Kai Forbath connected on his third field goal of the day, this time from 34 yards away, to seal the comeback victory 31–28.

With the win, the Redskins improved to 7–6, and 1–0 in overtime, as well as snapping a six-game losing streak to AFC teams. Washington's win also matched their longest win streak since 2008.

==== Week 15 ====
Washington Redskins at Cleveland Browns

Team	1	2	3	4	Total
• Redskins	7	3	14	14	38
Browns	7	7	0	7	21

- Date: December 16
- Location: Cleveland Browns Stadium, Cleveland, Ohio
- Game start: 1:00 p.m. EST
- Game attendance: 65,083
- Game weather: 58 °F (14 °C), Cloudy
- Referee: Bill Vinovich
- TV announcers (Fox): Ron Pitts, Mike Martz, and Krista Voda

Scoring summary
1	8:41	CLE	Trent Richardson 6-yard run (Phil Dawson kick)	Browns 7–0
1	2:16	WSH	Leonard Hankerson 54-yard pass from Kirk Cousins (Kai Forbath kick)	Tie 7–7
2	5:46	WSH	Kai Forbath 44-yard field goal	Redskins 10–7
2	1:11	CLE	Trent Richardson 1-yard run (Phil Dawson kick)	Browns 14–10
3	13:14	WSH	Alfred Morris 3-yard run (Kai Forbath kick)	Redskins 17–14
3	7:40	WSH	Leonard Hankerson 2-yard pass from Kirk Cousins (Kai Forbath kick)	Redskins 24–14
4	11:19	WSH	Evan Royster 4-yard run (Kai Forbath kick)	Redskins 31–14
4	10:11	CLE	Travis Benjamin 69-yard pass from Brandon Weeden (Phil Dawson kick)	Redskins 31–21
4	5:00	WSH	Alfred Morris 8-yard run (Kai Forbath kick)	Redskins 38–21

Following the overtime win against the Ravens, the Redskins traveled to Cleveland Browns Stadium to take on the Cleveland Browns in hopes to gain their first five-game win streak since 2005.

The game started slowly for the Redskins, behind rookie quarterback Kirk Cousins, filling in for fellow rookie Robert Griffin III, who sprained his LCL the week prior. After a series of punts, Cousins threw a pass over the middle that was intercepted by T. J. Ward and returned to the Redskins' 5-yard line. Cleveland then used their first-round rookie, Trent Richardson to punch it in and take a 7–0 lead. However, Cousins was able to settle in after this, as he fired a pass to Leonard Hankerson for a 54-yard score to even the game at 7 apiece.

In the second, both teams continued to exchange possessions, and eventually scores, in a tit-for-tat manner, as Kai Forbath connected from 44 yards out to give Washington a 10–7 lead. Cleveland, however would respond with another Richardson touchdown, to take a 14–10 lead at halftime.

In the third, Cleveland got the ball first, but Brandon Weeden threw an interception to Redskin linebacker Rob Jackson, and Washington quickly converted, as running back Alfred Morris scored from 3 yards out to put Washington back on top 17–14. Following a Cleveland punt, Washington drove down the field again, and Cousins again found Hankerson, this time from two yards away, and Washington took a 24–14 lead.

In the fourth, Washington capitalized on a second Weeden interception, this time by London Fletcher, and capped off the drive with an Evan Royster 4-yard touchdown run to take a 31–14 lead. However, Cleveland would not surrender, as Weeden found wide receiver Travis Benjamin for a 69-yard strike, and got back into the game at 31–21. Not to be outdone, Cousins led a clock-chewing, 5 minute drive that culminated with Morris' 2nd touchdown run of the day, this time from 8 yards out, to effectively put the game away, taking a 38–21 lead. Cleveland tried to answer, but went four and out, and Washington was able to run out the clock.

With the win, the Redskins advance to 8–6 which guaranteed them to end the season at .500 for the first time since 2008. Additionally, the win was their fifth consecutive win, their longest streak since Weeks 13–17 of the 2005 season. Most importantly, however, the New York Giants' 34–0 loss to the Atlanta Falcons put Washington in first place in the NFC East, meaning, if they won their final two games, they would be NFC East champions for the first time since 1999.

==== Week 16 ====
Washington Redskins at Philadelphia Eagles

Team	1	2	3	4	Total
• Redskins	0	13	14	0	27
Eagles	7	3	3	7	20

- Date: December 23
- Location: Lincoln Financial Field, Philadelphia, Pennsylvania
- Game start: 1:00 p.m. EST
- Game attendance: 69,144
- Game weather: 40 °F (4 °C), Sunny
- Referee: Ed Hochuli
- TV announcers (Fox): Thom Brennaman, Brian Billick, and Laura Okmin

Coming off their win over the Browns, Washington traveled to Lincoln Financial Field for a rematch with the rival Philadelphia Eagles, who they beat 31–6 in Week 11.

In the first, Philadelphia got the ball first, and subsequently got on the board first, as well, taking the opening kickoff and going on a drive in which they converted two fourth downs, and ended with quarterback Nick Foles finding wide receiver Jeremy Maclin for a 27-yard score and a 7–0 lead. Washington would be unable to answer in the quarter.

In the second, Washington had good field position, as Richard Crawford had just recovered a Foles fumble and Washington converted the fumble into a Kai Forbath 45-yard field goal to cut the deficit to 7–3. Forbath's field goal was his 16th consecutive field goal to start his career, tying an NFL record. Following a Philadelphia punt, Washington drove and called on Forbath again, this time from 42 yards, and he delivered to cut the lead to 7–6. This field goal was his 17th consecutive make, setting an NFL mark for consecutive field goals made to start a career. On Philadelphia's ensuing possession, Foles was intercepted by London Fletcher, and Washington got the ball at the Eagles' 25. Washington turned Philadelphia's second turnover of the quarter into a Josh Morgan 13-yard touchdown pass from Robert Griffin III, back in after missing last week's game, for a 13–7 lead. Philadelphia would answer with an Alex Henery 38-yard field goal to cut the Washington lead to 13–10 at the half.

In the third, Washington got the ball first, and drove down the field, capping off the drive with a 10-yard touchdown run by Alfred Morris to extend its advantage to 20–10. Philadelphia would respond with Henery connecting again, this time from 30 yards out, to cut the lead to 20–13. After exchanging punts, Washington got the ball back again, and this time Griffin found Santana Moss in the corner of the end zone for a 22-yard score and a 27–13 advantage. After a Philadelphia punt, Washington tried to drive down the field in an attempt to put the game on ice, but Griffin's pass was overthrown and intercepted by Colt Anderson of Philadelphia, and Philadelphia converted that into a Dion Lewis 17-yard scamper to cut Washington's advantage to 27–20. After Washington could not extend its advantage, Philadelphia got the ball back, and got into the red zone in the game's final minute. Despite an open Maclin in the end zone, Foles short-hopped the pass, and then tight end Evan Moore dropped another, and the Eagles had one final play. With 8 seconds remaining, Foles was pressured, threw an incomplete pass that did not reach the line of scrimmage, resulting in an illegal forward pass, and with only 1 second on the clock, the 1 second was run off due to the ten-second runoff rule, and Washington barely hung on for a 27–20 win.

With the nail-biting win, Washington improved to 9–6, 4–1 in the NFC East, winning six straight for the first time since 1996, clinching a winning record against the NFC East for the first time since 2005 and a winning overall record for the first time since 2007. Additionally, the win guaranteed that they would be in control of their own destiny in their season finale against the Dallas Cowboys. This is also the team's first seasonal sweep over the Eagles since 2008.

==== Week 17 ====
Dallas Cowboys at Washington Redskins

Team	1	2	3	4	Total
Cowboys	0	7	0	11	18
• Redskins	0	7	7	14	28

- Date: December 30
- Location: FedExField, Landover, Maryland
- Game start: 8:20 p.m. EST
- Game attendance: 82,845
- Game weather: 37 °F (3 °C), Cloudy
- Referee: Walt Anderson
- TV announcers (NBC): Al Michaels, Cris Collinsworth, and Michele Tafoya

Coming off their win over Philadelphia, Washington returned home for the season finale, a rematch against their archrival, the Dallas Cowboys, whom they beat 38–31 earlier in the year with the winner of the game clinching the NFC East on NBC Sunday Night Football. With playoff implications, the game was flexed to its prime-time, nationwide showing after proving to be one of the more competitive and intriguing match-ups in the final week of the regular season.

The game started off quickly, with the Cowboys forcing a Redskins three-and-out on the first possession. A 28-yard punt return by Dwayne Harris put the Cowboys in good field position early, but it proved to be irrelevant as Tony Romo threw an interception to Richard Crawford. After a missed Kai Forbath field goal, the first of his season and professional career, Romo failed to capitalize again deep in Redskins territory, throwing a second interception to Josh Wilson. The first quarter ended scoreless.

Dallas finally got the ball into the end zone 7 minutes into the 2nd quarter, as Romo found Jason Witten in the end zone, despite the missed call by the official when the play clock struck zero before the ball was snapped. Regardless, the Redskins rebounded with an 8-play drive that ended in an Alfred Morris 17-yard touchdown run. The half ended with the teams deadlocked at 7.

The defensive showdown continued through the 3rd, but Washington finally got their first lead of the game thanks to a Robert Griffin III 10-yard touchdown run. As the 4th quarter started, the Redskins defense stopped the Cowboys at their own 30-yard line, forcing Dallas to settle for a Dan Bailey field goal. Washington responded yet again, taking advantage of an injury-plagued Dallas defense, as Morris scored another rushing touchdown with 10 minutes left.

With the Redskins up by 11, the two teams traded punts, but it was Harris again that ran a Sav Rocca punt down to the Redskins 31-yard line, plus a penalty for grasping the facemask committed by Rocca himself, potentially saving a touchdown in the process. Rocca would later be fined $7,875 for the infraction. Dallas converted later with a Romo pass to Kevin Ogletree, plus a 2-point conversion. The Cowboys eventually got the ball back, but in what would be a pivotal moment in the game, Romo threw his third interception of the night to Rob Jackson with just over three minutes left. Washington took advantage with a one-yard touchdown run by Morris with 1:15 remaining; initially it appeared that Morris had fumbled and the Cowboys had recovered, but the call was quickly reversed and replays showed he had reached the end zone well before losing the ball. Up 2 scores, and Dallas being out of time-outs, this lead proved insurmountable leading to a Washington 28–18 victory.

The Redskins win improved them to 10–6, 5–1 in the NFC East, winning 7 in a row for the first time since 1996. It was the first time a team started a season 3–6 and made the playoffs since the 1996 Jacksonville Jaguars, The Redskins also clinched their first NFC East title since 1999, and returned to the playoffs for the first time since 2007 as the 4th seed. They also eliminated the Cowboys from playoff contention and swept them for the first time since 2005. Washington would not sweep the Cowboys again until 2020, by which the team had changed its name.

=== Postseason ===
==== Wild Card ====
Seattle Seahawks at Washington Redskins

Team	1	2	3	4	Total
• Seahawks	0	13	0	11	24
Redskins	14	0	0	0	14

- Date: January 6
- Location: FedExField, Landover, Maryland
- Game start: 4:30 p.m. EST
- Game attendance: 84,325
- Game weather: 52 °F (11 °C), Cloudy
- Referee: Pete Morelli
- TV announcers (Fox): Joe Buck, Troy Aikman, Pam Oliver, and Erin Andrews

Seattle overcame a 14-point deficit in the first quarter to earn their first playoff win on the road since 1983. Seattle won their third straight playoff game against Washington, who were playing in their first home playoff game since 1999. Coincidentally, the Seahawks also ended another playoff futility streak against the Redskins in 2005 when they beat them 20–10 at home in the divisional game for their first playoff victory since 1984 on their way to their first Super Bowl appearance. Robert Griffin III faced off against Russell Wilson for the second such instance of both teams starting with rookie quarterbacks in the playoffs, in the Super Bowl era; after T.J. Yates and Andy Dalton had previously done so for the Houston Texans and the Cincinnati Bengals respectively, in the previous year's playoffs.

Washington stormed out of the game with touchdowns on their first two drives. After receiving the opening kickoff, they drove 80 yards, featuring a 30-yard reception by Pierre Garçon and an 18-yard run by Alfred Morris. Griffin finished the drive with four-yard touchdown pass to reserve running back Evan Royster. Then the Redskins defense forced a three-and-out, and Richard Crawford gave them good field position with a 12-yard punt return to the 46-yard line. Washington subsequently moved the ball 54 yards and scored on Griffin's 4-yard toss to tight end Logan Paulsen.

But Seattle dominated the rest of the game, holding the Redskins to a final total of just 202 offensive yards. The Seahawks responded with a 66-yard drive, including a 19-yard scramble by Wilson, that ended on a field goal by Steven Hauschka. Following a punt, running back Marshawn Lynch's 20-yard gain on a fumble recovery set up their first touchdown of the game. Fullback Michael Robinson also made a big impact on the drive, catching a 19-yard pass from Wilson and capping the drive with a 4-yard touchdown catch. On the next possession, safety Earl Thomas intercepted a pass from Griffin on the Seattle 26-yard line. Wilson's subsequent completions to Doug Baldwin and Zach Miller for gains of 33 and 22 yards set up Hauschka's second field goal, cutting the score to 14–13 at the end of the half.

Seattle started the third quarter with a drive to the Redskins 1-yard line, but then Lynch lost a fumble that was recovered by Washington lineman Jarvis Jenkins. In the fourth quarter, he managed to redeem himself with a 27-yard touchdown run. Then Wilson completed a pass to Miller for the two-point conversion, giving his team a 21–14 lead. Then after the kickoff, Bruce Irvin sacked Griffin for a 12-yard loss. On the next play, Griffin fumbled the snap and suffered a game-ending injury. Seahawks lineman Clinton McDonald recovered the ball on the Redskins 5-yard line, setting up Hauschka's third field goal to make the final score 24–14. Washington responded with a drive to the Seattle 20, but turned the ball over on downs with 1:08 left in the game.

Wilson finished his first playoff game 15/26 for 187 yards and a touchdown, along with 67 rushing yards. Lynch rushed for 132 yards and a touchdown, and caught a pass for 9 yards. For the Redskins, safety Reed Doughty had 11 tackles and 2 sacks. Morris was their top rusher with 80 yards.

After the game, an MRI revealed Griffin had torn his lateral collateral ligament and would have to undergo surgery to repair it. In response, Washington head coach Mike Shanahan faced criticism for not pulling Griffin from the game earlier, despite warning signs he was playing injured. This was an injury that likely dated back to Week 14 when Griffin was injured versus Baltimore.

== Standings ==
NFC East
	W	L	T	PCT	DIV	CONF	PF	PA	STK
^{(4)} Washington Redskins	10	6	0	.625	5–1	8–4	436	388	W7
New York Giants	9	7	0	.563	3–3	8–4	429	344	W1
Dallas Cowboys	8	8	0	.500	3–3	5–7	376	400	L2
Philadelphia Eagles	4	12	0	.250	1–5	2–10	280	444	L3

== Pro Bowl ==
Five Redskins were elected to the 2013 Pro Bowl. From the offense, quarterback Robert Griffin III and offensive tackle Trent Williams both received invitations, while linebackers Lorenzo Alexander, London Fletcher and Ryan Kerrigan were elected from the defense. While he was voted a Pro Bowler, Robert Griffin III did not play in the game after suffering ACL and MCL injuries during the regular season and during the Wild-Card Round of the playoffs. And while Trent Williams was also voted in, he was removed from the game after an incident at a local nightclub in Honolulu, Hawaii, occurred in which he was struck over the head with a glass bottle, receiving stitches in the process, thus not playing. Charges were filed against the owner of the nightclub, but Williams did not receive any charges himself. Saints quarterback Drew Brees ended up taking RG3's position, while Vikings rookie offensive tackle Matt Kalil took Trent Williams' position. Kerrigan was selected because 49ers outside linebacker Aldon Smith had a Super Bowl to go to. London Fletcher replaced 49ers inside linebacker Patrick Willis for the same reason.

== Footnotes ==
^{^[a]} See Flexible Scheduling The Week 17 game was originally going to be aired on Fox, but due to playoff implications, NBC lobbied the NFL to move the game to Sunday Night Football. The game was ultimately moved to NBC.
