= Ryan Kerrigan =

American football player and coach (born 1988)

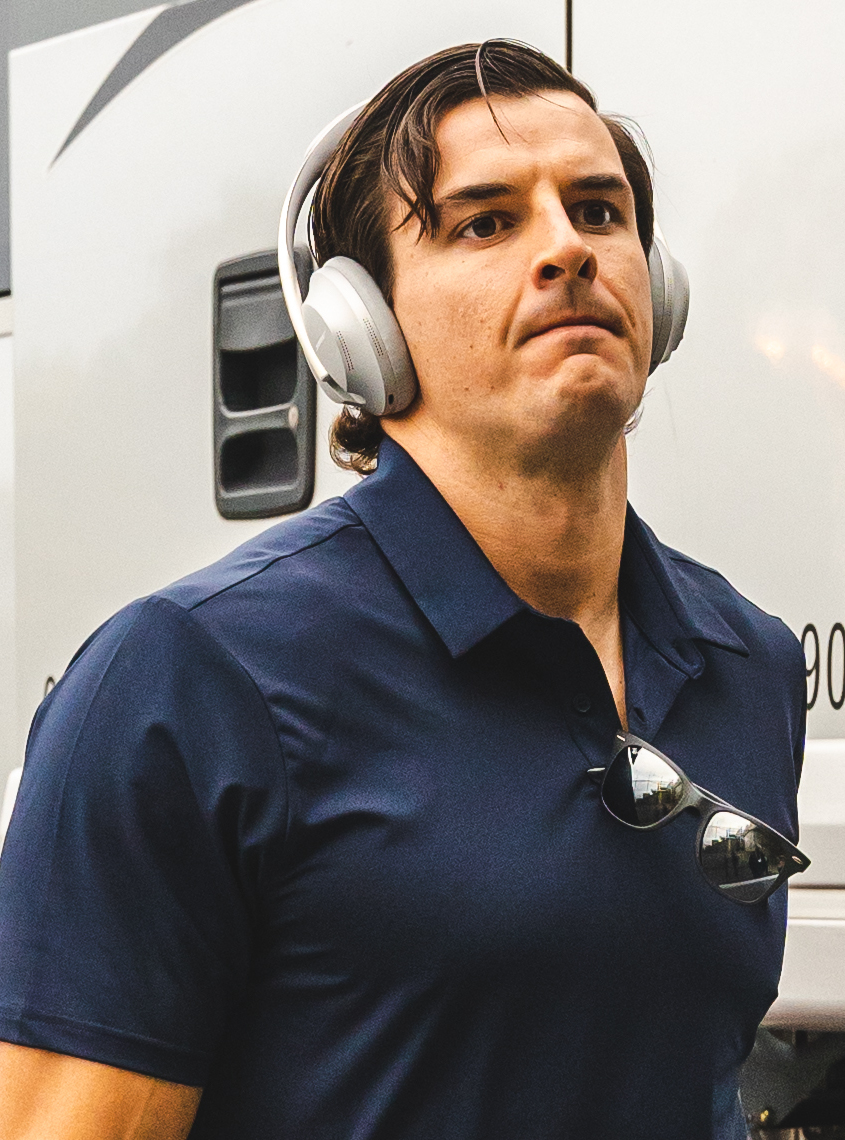
- Kerrigan in 2022

Personal information
- Born: August 16, 1988 (age 38); Muncie, Indiana, U.S.
- Listed height: 6 ft 4 in (1.93 m)
- Listed weight: 265 lb (120 kg)

Career information
- Positions: Outside linebacker, defensive end (No. 91, 90)
- High school: Muncie Central
- College: Purdue (2007–2010)
- NFL draft: 2011: 1st round, 16th overall pick

Career history

Playing
- Washington Redskins / Football Team (2011–2020); Philadelphia Eagles (2021)

Coaching
- Washington Commanders (2022–2025); Assistant defensive line coach (2022–2023); Assistant linebackers coach/pass rush specialist (2024–2025)

Awards and highlights
- Washington Commanders 90 Greatest; 4× Pro Bowl (2012, 2016–2018); NFL forced fumbles co-leader (2014); PFWA NFL All-Rookie Team (2011); Indiana Football Hall of Fame; Bill Willis Trophy (2010); Unanimous All-American (2010); Big Ten Defensive Player of the Year (2010); 2× first-team All-Big Ten (2009, 2010)

Career NFL statistics
- Tackles: 457
- Sacks: 95.5
- Forced fumbles: 26
- Fumble recoveries: 4
- Pass deflections: 25
- Interceptions: 3
- Interception yards: 61
- Defensive touchdowns: 3
- Stats at Pro Football Reference

Patrick Ryan Kerrigan (born August 16, 1988) is an American professional football coach and former player. He played college football for the Purdue Boilermakers, earning unanimous All-American honors as a senior before being selected by the Washington Redskins in the first round of the 2011 NFL draft.

Kerrigan played the majority of his 11-season career as an outside linebacker in the 3–4 defense, where he is the all-time NFL leader in consecutive starts by a left outside linebacker. In the final two seasons of his playing career, he played defensive end in a 4–3 defensive scheme. He is also Washington's all-time leader in sacks with 95.5, and forced fumbles (26). Kerrigan played the 2021 season with the Philadelphia Eagles before retiring and rejoining Washington as an assistant coach in 2022.

== Early life ==
Kerrigan was born on August 16, 1988, in Muncie, Indiana. He attended Muncie Central High School, where he played defensive end and tight end for the Muncie Bearcats high school football team. As a senior, he was an all-state selection after recording 90 tackles and 19 sacks as a defensive end. As a tight end, he had 40 receptions for 789 yards and six touchdowns. A three-star recruit, Kerrigan committed to Purdue over offers from Ball State, Cincinnati, Indiana, and Northern Illinois.

== College career ==
Kerrigan attended Purdue University, where he played for the Purdue Boilermakers football team from 2007 to 2010. As a freshman in 2007, Kerrigan appeared in 12 games recording 18 tackles and a sack. As a sophomore in 2008 he started 11 of 12 games and was an honorable mention All-Big Ten selection after recording 56 tackles, seven sacks and an interception. As a junior in 2009 he was a second team All-American by Rivals.com and a first team All-Big Ten selection. He finished the season with 66 tackles and 12 sacks. Kerrigan was also awarded Purdue's "Pit Bull Award" in 2009, which was given to the player that exemplified and displayed tenacity and tough play.

After forcing two fumbles against Michigan, Kerrigan became the Big Ten's all-time leader in forced fumbles; his total of 12 forced fumbles set the since-broken Football Bowl Subdivision (FBS) career record. Following his 2010 season, he was recognized as a unanimous All-American, honored as the Big Ten Defensive Player of the Year, and won the Bill Willis Trophy.

In June 2025, Kerrigan was named one of the 79 nominees for the 2026 class of the College Football Hall of Fame.

== Professional playing career ==
Pre-draft measurables
Height	Weight	Arm length	Hand span	Wingspan	40-yard dash	10-yard split	20-yard split	20-yard shuttle	Three-cone drill	Vertical jump	Broad jump	Bench press
6 ft 3 7/8 in (1.93 m)	267 lb (121 kg)	33 3/8 in (0.85 m)	9 1/2 in (0.24 m)	6 ft 5 5/8 in (1.97 m)	4.71 s	1.61 s	2.72 s	4.39 s	7.18 s	33.5 in (0.85 m)	10 ft 2 in (3.10 m)	31 reps
All values from NFL Combine

=== Washington Redskins / Football Team ===
==== 2011 ====
Kerrigan was selected by the Washington Redskins in the first round (16th overall) of the 2011 NFL draft. He signed his four-year rookie contract, worth US$8.72 million, on July 29, 2011.

Kerrigan made his professional regular season and first career start in the Redskins' season-opener against the New York Giants and recorded five combined tackles, a pass deflection, and returned an interception for a touchdown in their 28–14 victory. Kerrigan intercepted a pass by quarterback Eli Manning, that was originally intended for wide receiver Hakeem Nicks, and scored a nine-yard touchdown in the third quarter. The following week, he made three solo tackles, two pass deflections, and made his first career sack during their 22–21 victory against the Arizona Cardinals in Week 2. Kerrigan made his first career sack on quarterback Kevin Kolb for a four-yard loss in the second quarter. Kerrigan's performance over the first four games earned him the defensive rookie of the month honor for September. On November 13, 2011, Kerrigan collected a season-high six combined tackles and had two sacks on quarterback Matt Moore during a 20–9 loss at the Miami Dolphins. He started in all 16 games in 2011 and recorded 63 combined tackles (41 solo), 7.5 sacks, four forced fumbles, one interception, and one touchdown.

==== 2012 ====
On October 7, 2012, Kerrigan recorded five combined tackles, deflected a pass, and returned an interception for a touchdown during a 24–17 loss to the Atlanta Falcons in Week 5. Kerrigan intercepted a pass by Falcons' quarterback Matt Ryan and scored a 20-yard touchdown in the second quarter. In Week 14 against the Baltimore Ravens, he managed to tackle Joe Flacco and tip his pass to Ray Rice enough so linebacker London Fletcher could intercept the ball; preventing the Ravens from scoring and allowing the Redskins to tie the score and eventually win the game in overtime. In Week 16, Kerrigan recorded a season-high five combined tackles and two sacks during a 27–20 victory at the Philadelphia Eagles. He had two sacks on quarterback Nick Foles and stripped the ball during one of them which was recovered by cornerback Richard Crawford. Kerrigan started all 16 games in 2012 and recorded 54 combined tackles (42 solo), 8.5 sacks, eight pass deflections, an interception, and a touchdown.

The Washington Redskins finished first in the NFC East with a 10–6 record and earned a playoff berth. On January 6, 2013, Kerrigan started his first career playoff game and recorded four combined tackles during a 24–14 loss to the Seattle Seahawks in the NFC Wild Card Round. On January 20, 2013, it was announced that Kerrigan was added to the 2013 Pro Bowl as a replacement for Aldon Smith who was set to appear in Super Bowl XLVII with the San Francisco 49ers.

==== 2013 ====
Defensive coordinator Jim Haslett retained Kerrigan, Brian Orakpo, Perry Riley, and London Fletcher as the linebacking corps in 2013.

He started in the Washington Redskins' season-opener against the Philadelphia Eagles and collected a season-high eight combined tackles and made one sack in their 33–27 loss. The following week, he made five solo tackles and a career-high two sacks on quarterback Aaron Rodgers in the Redskins' 38–20 loss at the Green Bay Packers in Week 2. In Week 3, Kerrigan tore his lateral meniscus in his left knee, but chose to play through the season. On December 29, 2013, the Washington Redskins fired head coach Mike Shanahan after they finished the season with a 4–12 record. Kerrigan started in all 16 games and recorded a career-high 66 combined tackles (47 solo), 8.5 sacks, and three pass deflections.

==== 2014 ====
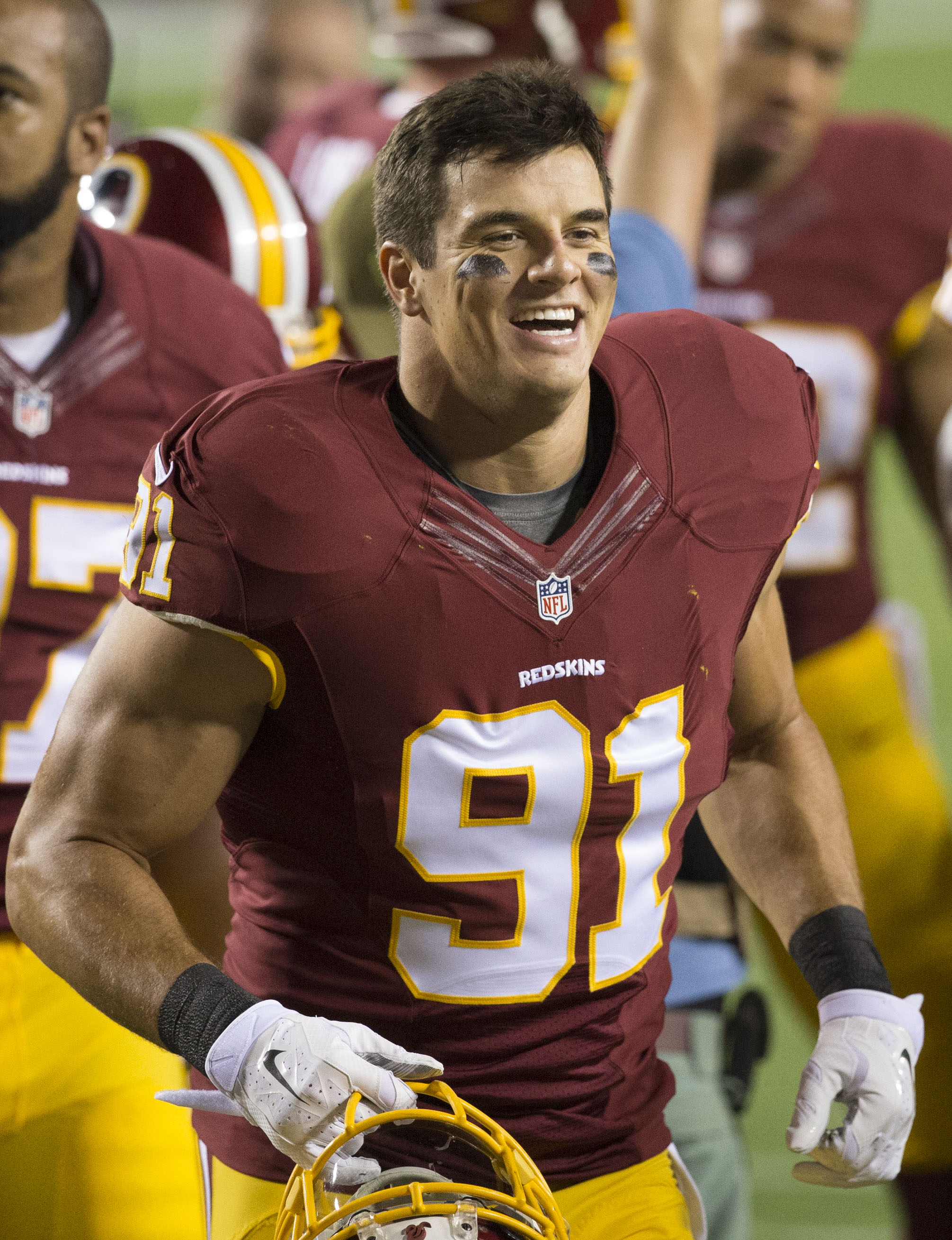
Kerrigan in 2014

On January 2, 2014, Kerrigan underwent arthroscopic surgery to repair his torn ligament in his knee. On May 2, 2014, the Washington Redskins exercised the fifth-year option of Kerrigan's rookie contract, which would keep him on roster throughout the 2015 season for $7.03 million. Head coach Jay Gruden named Kerrigan and Brian Orakpo the starting outside linebackers to start the regular season, along with inside linebackers Keenan Robinson and Perry Riley.

On September 19, 2014, Kerrigan recorded four solo tackles and had a career-high four sacks on quarterback Chad Henne during the Redskins' 41–10 victory against the Jacksonville Jaguars in Week 2. In Week 6, he collected a season-high nine combined tackles and was credited with half a sack in a 30–20 loss at the Arizona Cardinals. He started in all 16 games in 2014 and recorded 64 combined tackles (51 solo), a career-high 13.5 sacks, five forced fumbles, and a pass deflection. He became the Redskins' sixth all-time franchise sack leader with 38 total sacks. On December 31, 2014, the Washington Redskins announced the decision to mutually part ways with defensive coordinator Jim Haslett. He was ranked 78th by his fellow players on the NFL Top 100 Players of 2015.

==== 2015 ====
Kerrigan was named the 78th best player by his peers on the NFL Top 100 Players of 2015. On May 20, 2015, Kerrigan underwent arthroscopic surgery on his left knee.

On July 29, 2015, the Washington Redskins signed Kerrigan to a five-year, $57.50 million contract extension that includes $23.78 million guaranteed and a signing bonus of $16 million.

Defensive coordinator Joe Barry opted to retain the 3-4 defense and named Kerrigan and Trent Murphy the starting outside linebackers, along with inside linebackers Perry Riley and Keenan Robinson. In Week 14, he collected a season-high five combined tackles and made a sack during a 24–21 victory at the Chicago Bears. Kerrigan started in all 16 games for the fifth consecutive season and recorded 42 combined tackles (33 solo), 9.5 sacks, three pass deflections, and two forced fumbles.

The Washington Redskins finished atop of the NFC East with a 9–7 record and earned a playoff berth. On January 10, 2016, he made two combined tackles and a pass deflection during the Redskins' 35–18 loss to the Green Bay Packers in the NFC Wild Card Round.

==== 2016 ====
Kerrigan entered training camp slated as the starting weakside linebacker. Head coach Jay Gruden named Kerrigan and Preston Smith the starting outside linebackers to begin the regular season, along with inside linebackers Mason Foster and Will Compton. In the Week 5, Kerrigan reached his 50th career sack by sacking quarterback Joe Flacco towards the end of the second quarter of the Redskins' 16–10 victory at the Baltimore Ravens. On October 16, 2016, he made four combined tackles and made a season-high two sacks on quarterback Carson Wentz during a 27–20 victory against the Philadelphia Eagles in Week 6. In Week 12, Kerrigan collected a season-high five combined tackles and had one sack during a 31–26 loss at the Dallas Cowboys. On December 20, 2016, he was named to the 2017 Pro Bowl roster, which was his second Pro Bowl nomination. He started all 16 games in 2016 and recorded 33 combined tackles (25 solo), 10.5 sacks, two forced fumbles, and two pass deflections. Pro Football Focus gave Kerrigan an overall grade of 82.2, which ranked 10th among all qualifying 3-4 outside linebackers in 2016.

==== 2017 ====
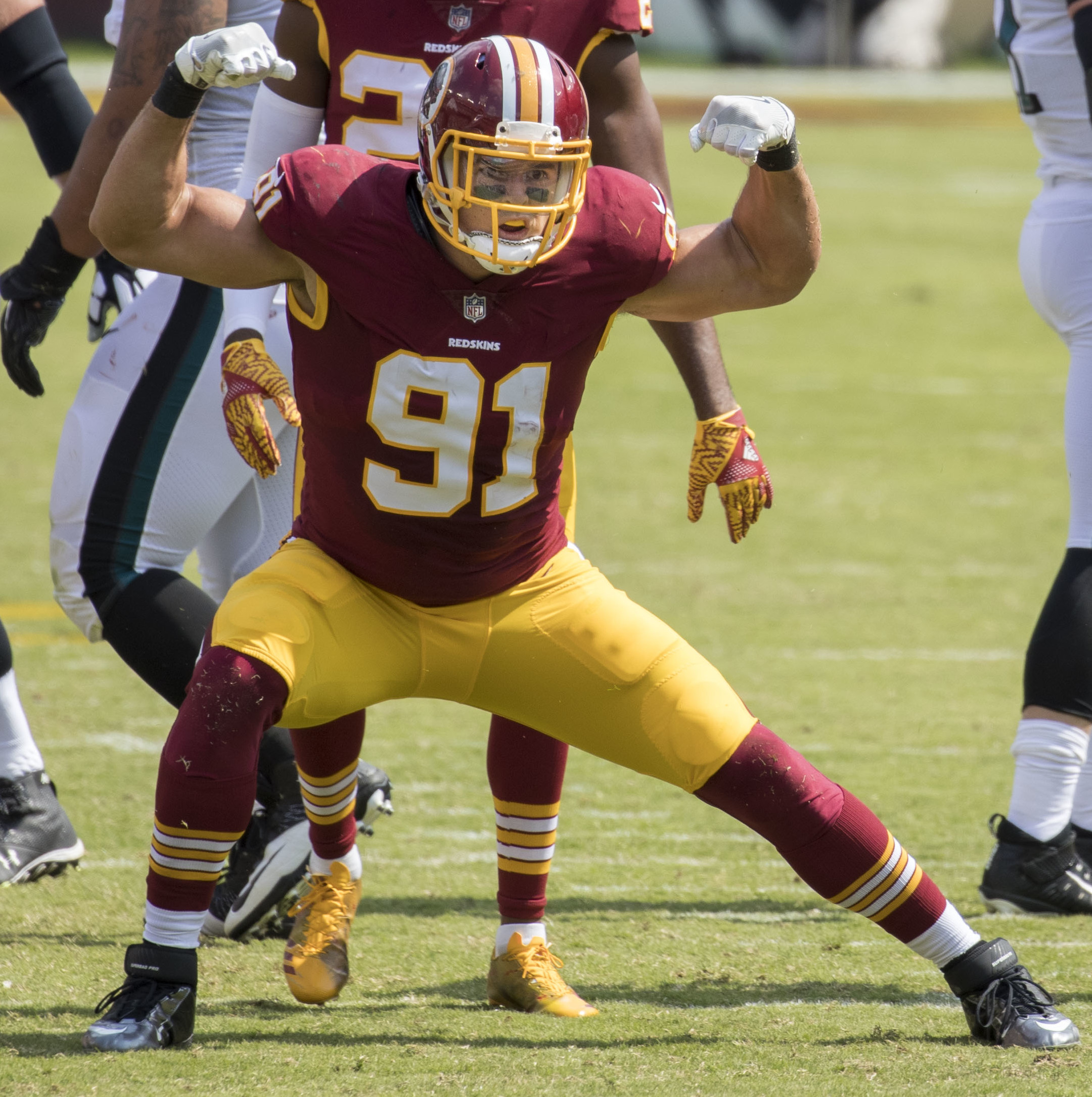
Kerrigan in 2017 performing his signature sack celebration

On January 5, 2017, the Washington Redskins fired defensive coordinator Joe Barry. Defensive coordinator Greg Manusky retained Kerrigan and Preston Smith as the starting outside linebackers to begin the regular season in 2017, along with inside linebackers Mason Foster and Zach Brown.

He started in the Washington Redskins' season-opener against the Philadelphia Eagles and recorded three combined tackles, half a sack, a pass deflection, and returned an interception for a touchdown during a 30–17 loss. Kerrigan intercepted a pass by quarterback Carson Wentz, that was initially intended for running back Darren Sproles, and returned it for a 24-yard touchdown in the second quarter. In Week 7, he collected a season-high six combined tackles and was credited with half a sack as the Redskins lost at the Philadelphia Eagles 34–24. On December 19, 2017, Kerrigan was named to his third Pro Bowl. On December 31, 2017, Kerrigan made two solo tackles and a season-high tying two sacks during an 18–10 loss at the New York Giants. He started in all 16 games and recorded 46 combined tackles (34 solo), 13 sacks, a pass deflection, an interception, and a touchdown. Pro Football Focus gave Kerrigan an overall grade of 84.2, which ranked 13th among all qualifying edge rushers in 2017.

==== 2018 ====
In 2018, Kerrigan stripped the ball from quarterback Dak Prescott in the end zone, which was recovered by Preston Smith and scoring a defensive touchdown that helped seal the Week 7 win against the Dallas Cowboys. Kerrigan recorded two sacks in the Week 15 win over the Jacksonville Jaguars putting him at second overall on the Washington Redskins all-time sacks list at 82.5 sacks, surpassing former defensive end Charles Mann. By the end of season, Kerrigan extended that record to 84.5 sacks.

==== 2019 ====
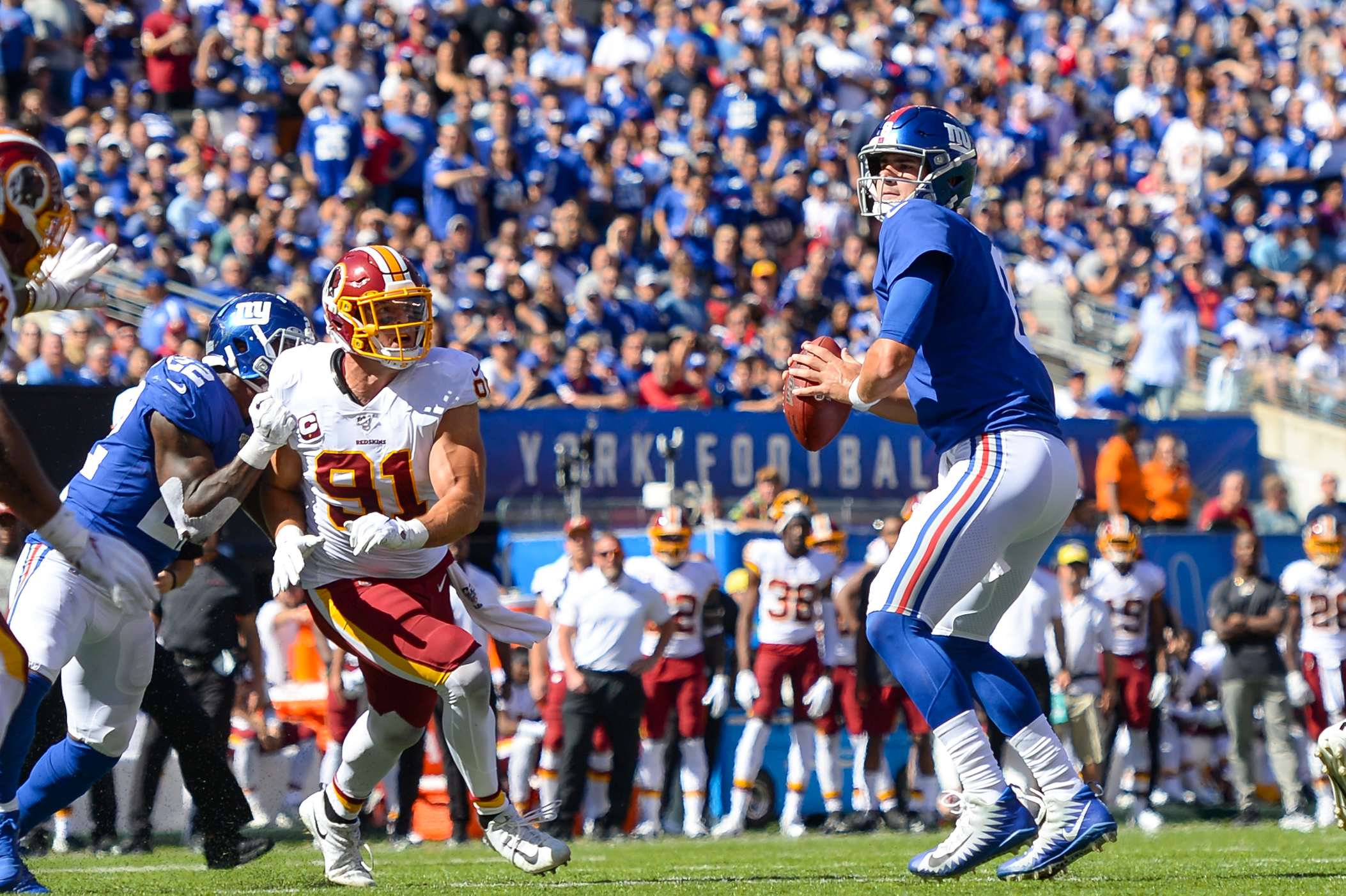
Kerrigan in a 2019 game against the New York Giants.

In Week 2 against the Dallas Cowboys, Kerrigan recorded his first sack of the season on Dak Prescott as the Redskins lost 31–21. In Week 11 against the New York Jets, Kerrigan sacked Sam Darnold twice and forced a fumble during the 34–17 loss. In Week 12 against the Detroit Lions, Kerrigan recorded half a sack on Jeff Driskel before exiting the game with a concussion. Without Kerrigan, the Redskins won 19–16. Kerrigan missed the following game against the Carolina Panthers due to the concussion he suffered. This was the first game that Kerrigan did not play in during his entire career. Though he returned the following week to play against the Green Bay Packers, he left the game in third quarter with a calf injury. Kerrigan was place on injured reserve on December 13, 2019. He finished the 2019 season with 5.5 sacks, 25 total tackles (16 solo), and one pass defended.

==== 2020 ====
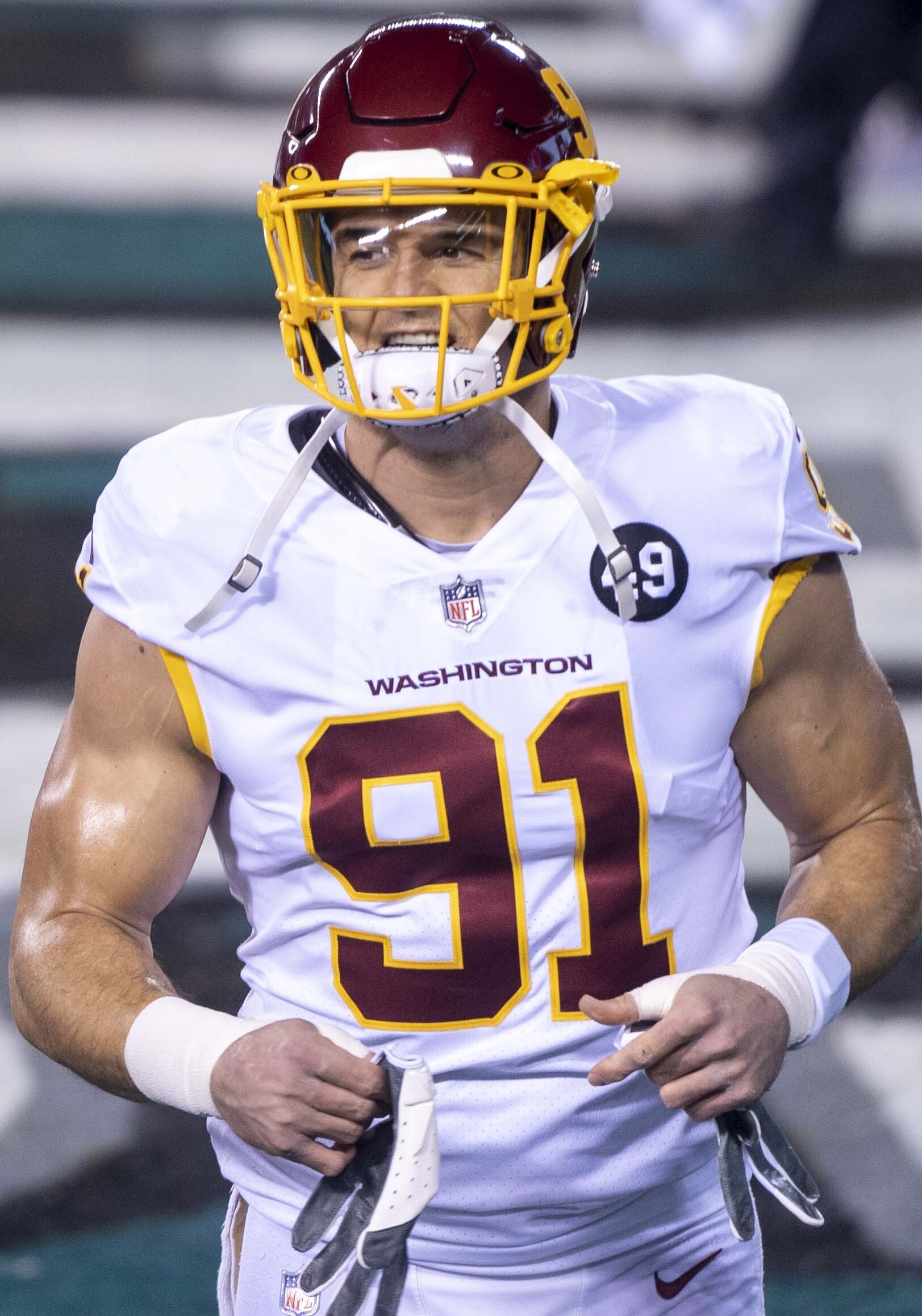
Kerrigan in his final season with Washington.

Kerrigan switched to defensive end after Washington defensive coordinator Jack Del Rio implemented a 4–3 defense. In the season opening game against the Philadelphia Eagles, Kerrigan surpassed Dexter Manley as Washington's all-time leader in sacks after a two sack performance. He also recovered a fumble and was named NFC defensive player of the week following the game, the first of his career. He finished the year with 5.5 sacks, giving him 95.5 in his career with Washington.

=== Philadelphia Eagles ===
Kerrigan signed a one-year contract with the Philadelphia Eagles on May 17, 2021. He had a limited role with the team, playing as a reserve before starting the final two games of the season. He was placed on the COVID list in December and was activated a week later. In the team's Wild Card Round game against the Buccaneers, he recorded two tackles for loss and 1.5 sacks.

== NFL statistics ==
Legend
	Led the league
**Bold**	Career high

Year	Team	Games		Tackles				Interceptions						Fumbles	
Year	Team	GP	GS	Cmb	Solo	Ast	Sck	PD	Int	Yds	Avg	Lng	TD	FF	FR
2011	WAS	16	16	64	42	**22**	7.5	4	**1**	9	9	9T	**1**	4	0
2012	WAS	16	16	54	42	12	8.5	**8**	**1**	**28**	**28**	**28T**	**1**	2	**1**
2013	WAS	16	16	**66**	47	19	8.5	3	—	—	—	—	—	4	0
2014	WAS	16	16	64	**51**	13	**13.5**	1	—	—	—	—	—	**5**	**1**
2015	WAS	16	16	42	33	9	9.5	3	—	—	—	—	—	2	0
2016	WAS	16	16	33	26	7	11.0	2	—	—	—	—	—	2	0
2017	WAS	16	16	46	34	12	13.0	1	**1**	24	24	24T	**1**	3	0
2018	WAS	16	16	43	30	13	13.0	1	—	—	—	—	—	3	**1**
2019	WAS	12	12	25	16	9	5.5	1	—	—	—	—	—	1	0
2020	WAS	16	1	17	9	8	5.5	1	—	—	—	—	—	0	**1**
2021	PHI	16	2	3	3	0	0	0	—	—	—	—	—	0	0
Career		172	143	457	333	124	95.5	25	3	61	20.3	28	3	26	4

== Coaching career ==
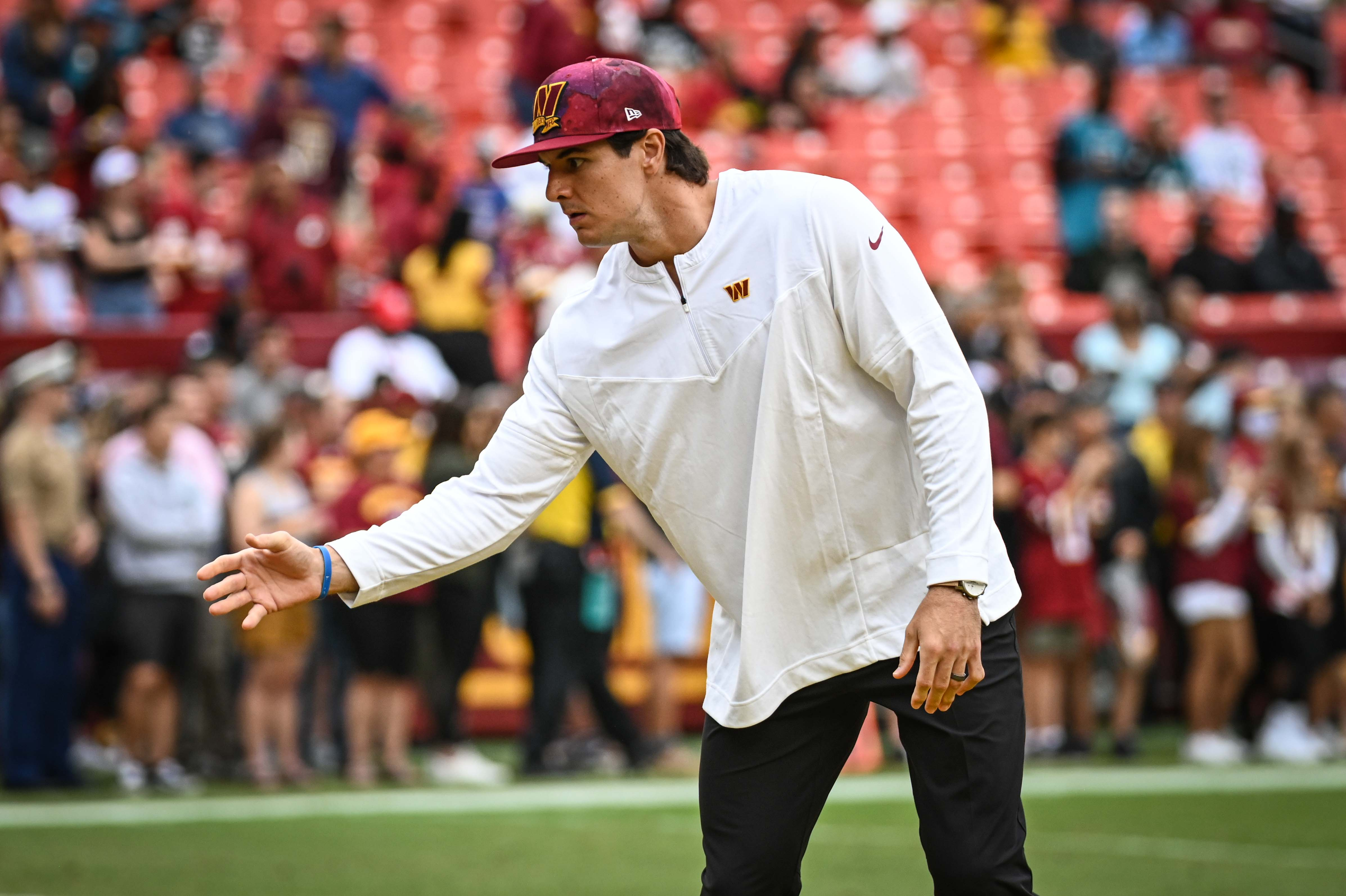
Kerrigan coaching for the Commanders in the 2022 season.

Kerrigan announced his retirement as a player on July 29, 2022, signing a one-day contract with Washington to retire with the franchise. He rejoined Washington as a coaching intern during training camp before being officially named their assistant defensive line coach on September 5, 2022. Shortly before the announcement, Kerrigan was also inducted into Washington's Greatest Players list. On February 12, 2024, Kerrigan was promoted to the assistant linebackers coach and pass rush specialist under new head coach Dan Quinn. Following the 2025 season and the hiring of Daronte Jones as the team's new defensive coordinator, Kerrigan was not retained as part of the defensive staff and let go on January 31, 2026.

== Analyst career ==
In July 2026, the Big Ten Network (BTN) announced the hiring of Kerrigan as part of their broadcast team as an analyst to cover college football.

== Personal life ==
Kerrigan's father, Brendan, played football at Ball State. His brother, Kyle, was a member of the DePauw University swim team. Kerrigan has two sisters, Kristina and Kaitlin, who played collegiate volleyball for the University of Indianapolis and Grace College, respectively. Kerrigan has a severe loss of hearing in his left ear, which was caused by an ear infection he suffered at the age of eight. Kerrigan and his wife, Jessica, have two daughters, Lincoln Georgie and Hayes Frankie.

Kerrigan created a charitable foundation in 2013 to serve children in his community. He has appeared in several local car dealership commercials. Kerrigan appeared as NASA technician Garber in Sharknado 3: Oh Hell No! He was inducted into the Indiana Football Hall of Fame in 2023.
