= Madieu Williams =

Sierra Leonean gridiron football player (born 1981)

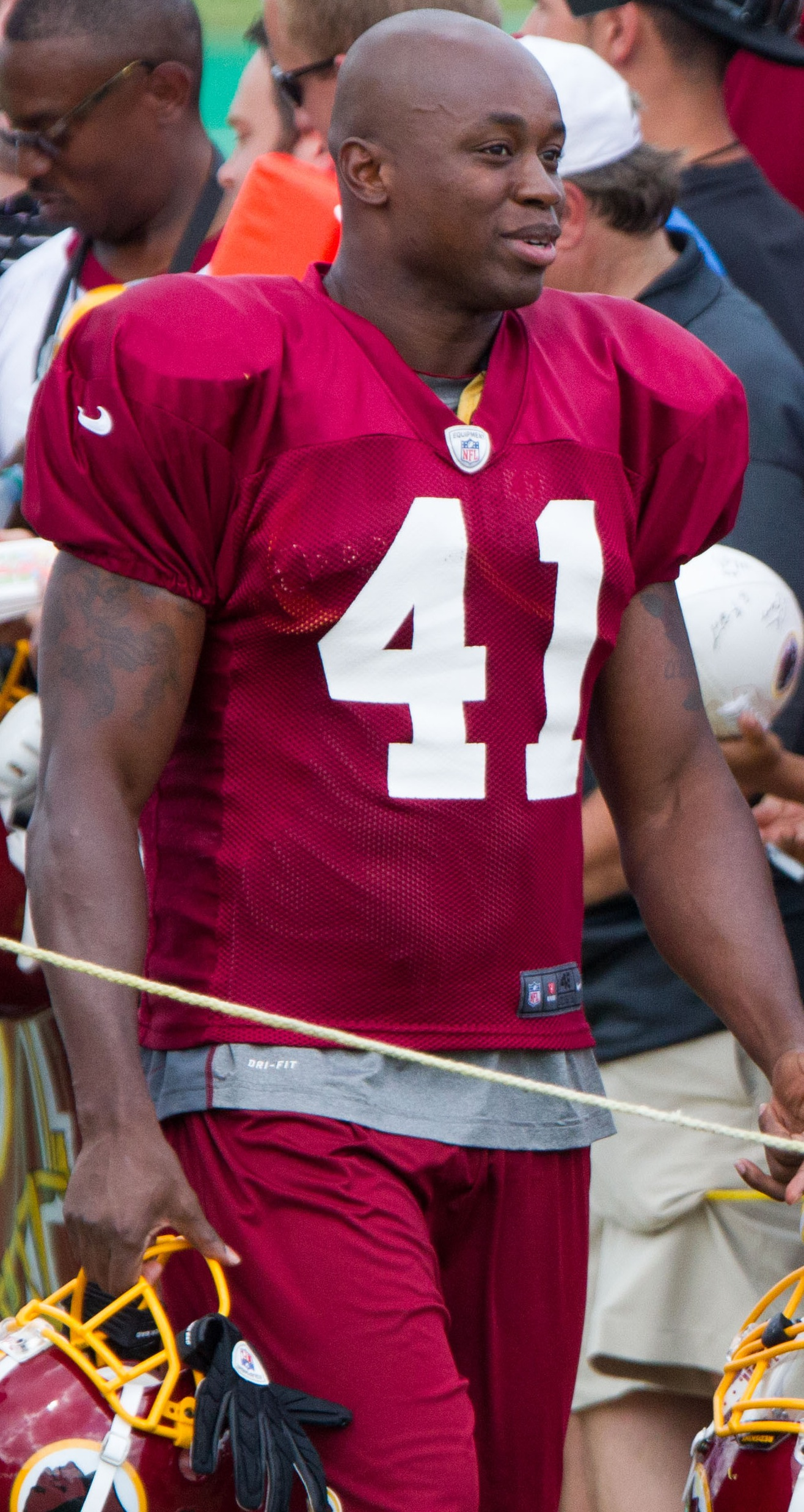
- Williams with the Washington Redskins in 2012

No. 40, 20, 41
- Position: Safety

Personal information
- Born: October 18, 1981 (age 45); Freetown, Sierra Leone
- Listed height: 6 ft 1 in (1.85 m)
- Listed weight: 209 lb (95 kg)

Career information
- High school: DuVal (Lanham, Maryland, U.S.)
- College: Towson (1999–2000); Maryland (2001–2003)
- NFL draft: 2004: 2nd round, 56th overall pick

Career history
- Cincinnati Bengals (2004–2007); Minnesota Vikings (2008–2010); San Francisco 49ers (2011); Washington Redskins (2012)

Awards and highlights
- Walter Payton NFL Man of the Year (2010); 2× Second-team All-ACC (2002, 2003)

Career NFL statistics
- Total tackles: 589
- Sacks: 5.5
- Forced fumbles: 4
- Fumble recoveries: 4
- Interceptions: 13
- Defensive touchdowns: 2
- Stats at Pro Football Reference

Madieu Mohammed Williams (born October 18, 1981) is a Sierra Leonean former professional American football safety who played in the National Football League (NFL). He played college football at Maryland and was selected by the Cincinnati Bengals in the second round of the 2004 NFL draft.

Williams also played for the Minnesota Vikings, San Francisco 49ers and Washington Redskins.

== Early life ==
Williams was born in Sierra Leone, West Africa to Oku parents and moved to Lanham, Maryland at the age of nine. He attended DuVal High School, Towson University, and the University of Maryland.

== Professional career ==
Pre-draft measurables
Height	Weight	Arm length	Hand span	40-yard dash	20-yard shuttle	Three-cone drill	Vertical jump	Broad jump	Bench press
6 ft 0 3/8 in (1.84 m)	193 lb (88 kg)	31 1/2 in (0.80 m)	8 3/4 in (0.22 m)	4.48 s	4.18 s	6.60 s	39.5 in (1.00 m)	10 ft 10 in (3.30 m)	18 reps
All values from NFL Combine/Pro Day

=== Cincinnati Bengals ===
After being drafted 56th overall in the second round of the 2004 NFL Draft by the Cincinnati Bengals using a pick they acquired in a trade that sent Corey Dillon to the New England Patriots, Williams contributed early by playing in all 16 games. He finished the season with 103 tackles, 11 pass deflections, two sacks, and three interceptions. He returned one of the interceptions for a touchdown.

In 2005, Williams only played in 4 games, missing the other 12 due to injury. He did, however, record 23 tackles and an interception.

In 2006, Williams returned to play all 16 games of the season. He finished the season with 90 tackles, 13 pass break-ups, two forced fumbles, and three interceptions.

In 2007, injuries again caused Williams to miss three games of the season. He finished up the season with 74 tackles, 7 pass deflections, two sacks, one forced fumble, two fumble recoveries, and two interceptions. He opened up the season with 10 tackles in the Monday Night Football opener against the Baltimore Ravens.

=== Minnesota Vikings ===
After spending his first four years with Cincinnati, Williams signed with Minnesota following the 2007 season. He agreed to a six-year, $33 million contract. He missed the first 7 games of the 2008 season due to a neck injury he suffered during training camp. In his first game back he intercepted Sage Rosenfels to wrap up the win for the Vikings. He finished the 2008 season with 42 tackles and 2 interceptions. On July 28, 2011, he was released.

=== San Francisco 49ers ===
Williams signed with the San Francisco 49ers on August 1, 2011.

=== Washington Redskins ===
Williams signed with the Washington Redskins on April 10, 2012. He became the Redskins' starting free safety after Tanard Jackson, his main competition for the starting position, was suspended for an entire season. In Week 6 win against his former team, the Minnesota Vikings, he intercepted a pass from Christian Ponder and returned it 24 yards for a touchdown.

== NFL career statistics ==
Legend
**Bold**	Career high

=== Regular season ===
Year	Team	Games		Tackles					Interceptions					Fumbles			
Year	Team	GP	GS	Cmb	Solo	Ast	Sck	TFL	Int	Yds	TD	Lng	PD	FF	FR	Yds	TD
2004	CIN	**16**	13	**103**	**86**	17	**2.0**	**6**	**3**	**51**	**1**	**51**	11	0	**2**	-3	0
2005	CIN	4	3	23	17	6	0.0	1	1	2	0	2	3	0	0	0	0
2006	CIN	**16**	**16**	90	68	22	0.0	4	**3**	33	0	25	**13**	**2**	0	0	0
2007	CIN	13	13	74	58	16	**2.0**	**6**	2	40	0	35	7	1	1	**2**	0
2008	MIN	9	9	42	38	4	0.0	1	2	-1	0	0	3	0	0	0	0
2009	MIN	**16**	**16**	74	61	13	0.0	2	0	0	0	0	4	0	1	0	0
2010	MIN	14	13	75	50	25	0.5	1	1	0	0	0	2	1	0	0	0
2011	SF	15	3	9	6	3	0.0	0	0	0	0	0	0	0	0	0	0
2012	WAS	**16**	**16**	99	66	**33**	1.0	3	1	24	**1**	24	6	0	0	0	0
Career		119	102	589	450	139	5.5	24	13	149	2	51	49	4	4	-1	0

=== Playoffs ===
Year	Team	Games		Tackles					Interceptions					Fumbles			
Year	Team	GP	GS	Cmb	Solo	Ast	Sck	TFL	Int	Yds	TD	Lng	PD	FF	FR	Yds	TD
2008	MIN	1	1	4	4	0	0.0	**2**	0	0	0	0	0	0	0	0	0
2009	MIN	**2**	**2**	**11**	**6**	**5**	0.0	0	0	0	0	0	0	0	0	0	0
2011	SF	**2**	0	1	1	0	0.0	0	0	0	0	0	0	**1**	0	0	0
2012	WAS	1	1	3	3	0	0.0	0	0	0	0	0	**1**	0	0	0	0
Career		6	4	19	14	5	0.0	2	0	0	0	0	1	1	0	0	0

== Training methods ==
Madieu trains with an athletic group known as "The Stable", to whom he has credited to his success stemming from his freshman year in high school. "This is home, and I feel good when I’m working out," said Williams, who's headed into his fourth season. "It’s a lot of guys that put in a lot of work getting ready for whatever sport that they play. It’s a lot of camaraderie beyond us training."

== Community service ==
The Madieu Williams Foundation, founded in 2005, focuses on health, wellness, nutrition, fitness and education. Through his foundation, Madieu reaches out to youth and teaches them at an early age the importance of a healthy lifestyle.

Recently, Madieu Williams was honored by Hall of Famer Franco Harris and Harris' company, R Super Foods, as their Cincinnati Super MVP.

In 2009, Williams donated $2 million to the University of Maryland to help create the Madieu Williams Center for Global Health Initiatives. It is the largest gift to the university by an African-American alum.

On February 6, 2011, Williams received the Walter Payton Man of the Year Award. Every year, on Maryland Day, Williams hosts a free football camp run by former and current terps college and NFL players. Players like Torrey Smith have attended the camp and have coached ages 6–14.
