= Richard Crawford (American football) =

American football player (born 1990)

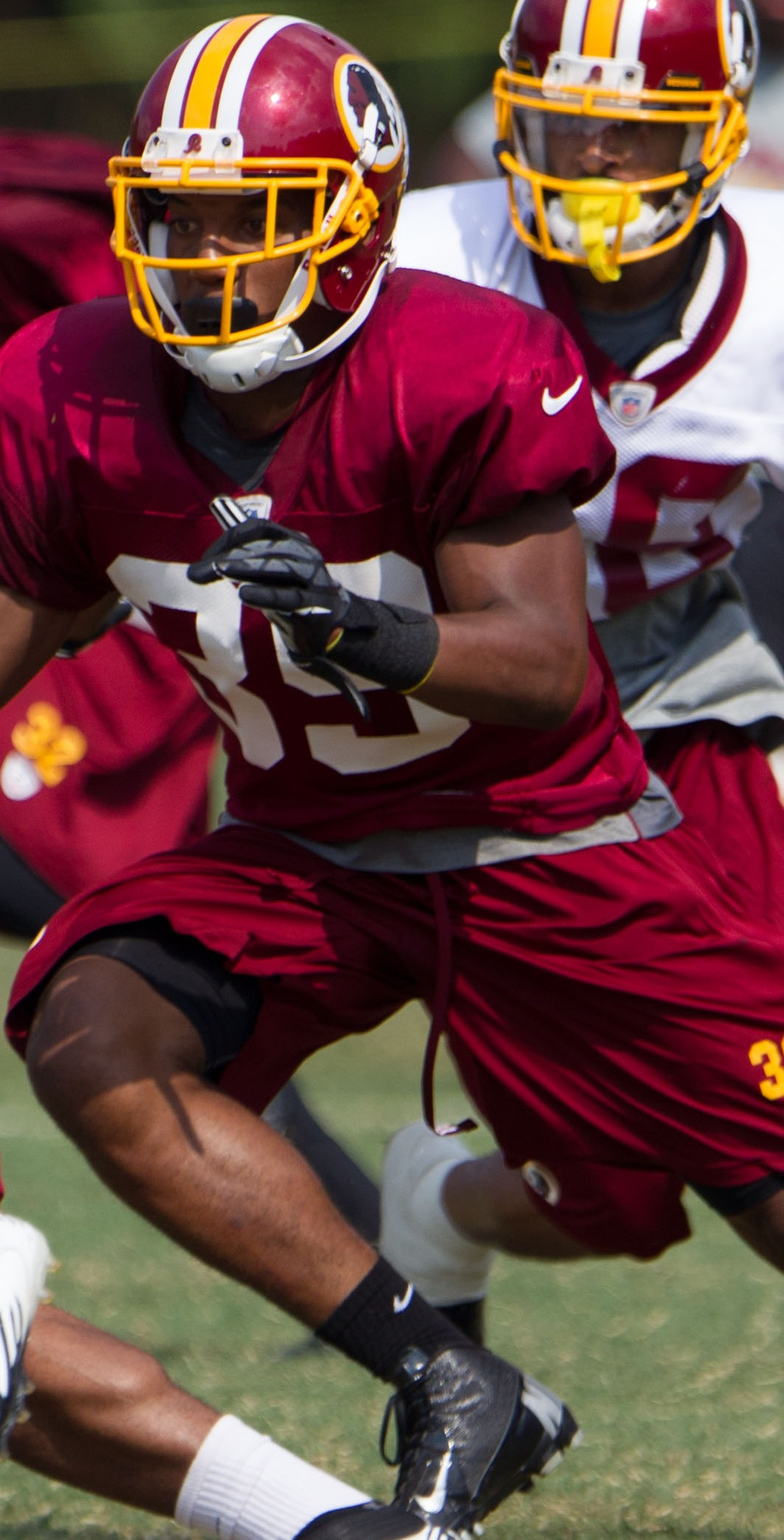
- Crawford with the Washington Redskins in 2012

No. 39
- Position: Cornerback

Personal information
- Born: August 1, 1990 (age 36); Oceanside, California, U.S.
- Listed height: 5 ft 11 in (1.80 m)
- Listed weight: 192 lb (87 kg)

Career information
- High school: El Camino (Oceanside)
- College: SMU
- NFL draft: 2012: 7th round, 213th overall pick

Career history
- Washington Redskins (2012–2014); San Diego Chargers (2014–2015)

Awards and highlights
- First-team All-C-USA (2011)

Career NFL statistics
- Total tackles: 18
- Pass deflections: 2
- Interceptions: 1
- Return yards: 156
- Stats at Pro Football Reference

Richard Crawford (born August 1, 1990) is an American former professional football player who was a cornerback in National Football League (NFL). He was selected in the seventh round of the 2012 NFL draft by the Washington Redskins. He played college football for the SMU Mustangs.

== Early life ==
Crawford, of Oceanside, California, attended Oceanside Adventist Elementary for 8 years, graduating in 2005. He went to El Camino High School and graduated in 2008.

== Professional career ==
=== Washington Redskins ===
Crawford was selected 213th overall by the Washington Redskins in the seventh round of the 2012 NFL draft, joining SMU teammate Josh LeRibeus, who was selected by the Redskins in the third round. On May 4, 2012, the Redskins officially signed him to a four-year contract. At the start of 2012 training camp, it was announced that Crawford was taking reps as punt returner providing competition for Brandon Banks. After having an impressive preseason, that included having two interceptions and displaying good punt returning skills, he made the final 53-man roster at the start of the 2012 season.

On September 9, 2012, he made his NFL debut in the season opener against the New Orleans Saints and had one tackle. In Week 14 against the Baltimore Ravens, he and Niles Paul took over punt/kick return duties for an inactive Brandon Banks. In overtime, Crawford returned a punt for 64 yards, which set up the game-winning field goal. He would later recover the ball after Ryan Kerrigan forced Nick Foles to fumble in Week 16. In the last regular season game against the Dallas Cowboys, Crawford recorded his first interception on Tony Romo in the Cowboys' first drive of the game.

Crawford announced via his Twitter account that he would be changing his jersey from #39 to #20 on April 6, 2013. In the third 2013 preseason game against the Buffalo Bills, he suffered a season-ending injury to his LCL and ACL during a punt return. The Redskins waived/injured him on August 26, 2013, two days he was placed on injured reserve after clearing waivers.

Crawford was released during final cuts on August 29, 2014. After clearing waivers, he was signed to the team's practice squad the following day. He was waived on September 9, 2014.

Crawford re-signed with the Redskins on September 29, 2014. He was waived on October 7.

=== San Diego Chargers ===
Crawford signed with the San Diego Chargers on October 27, 2014. He was waived on November 22, but the Chargers signed him to their practice squad four days later. On September 4, 2015, Crawford was released.

The Chargers signed Crawford to a futures contract on January 4, 2016. On September 3, 2016, he was released by the Chargers. Crawford is now retired due to a knee injury after 4 surgeries.
