= Josh LeRibeus =

American football player (born 1989)

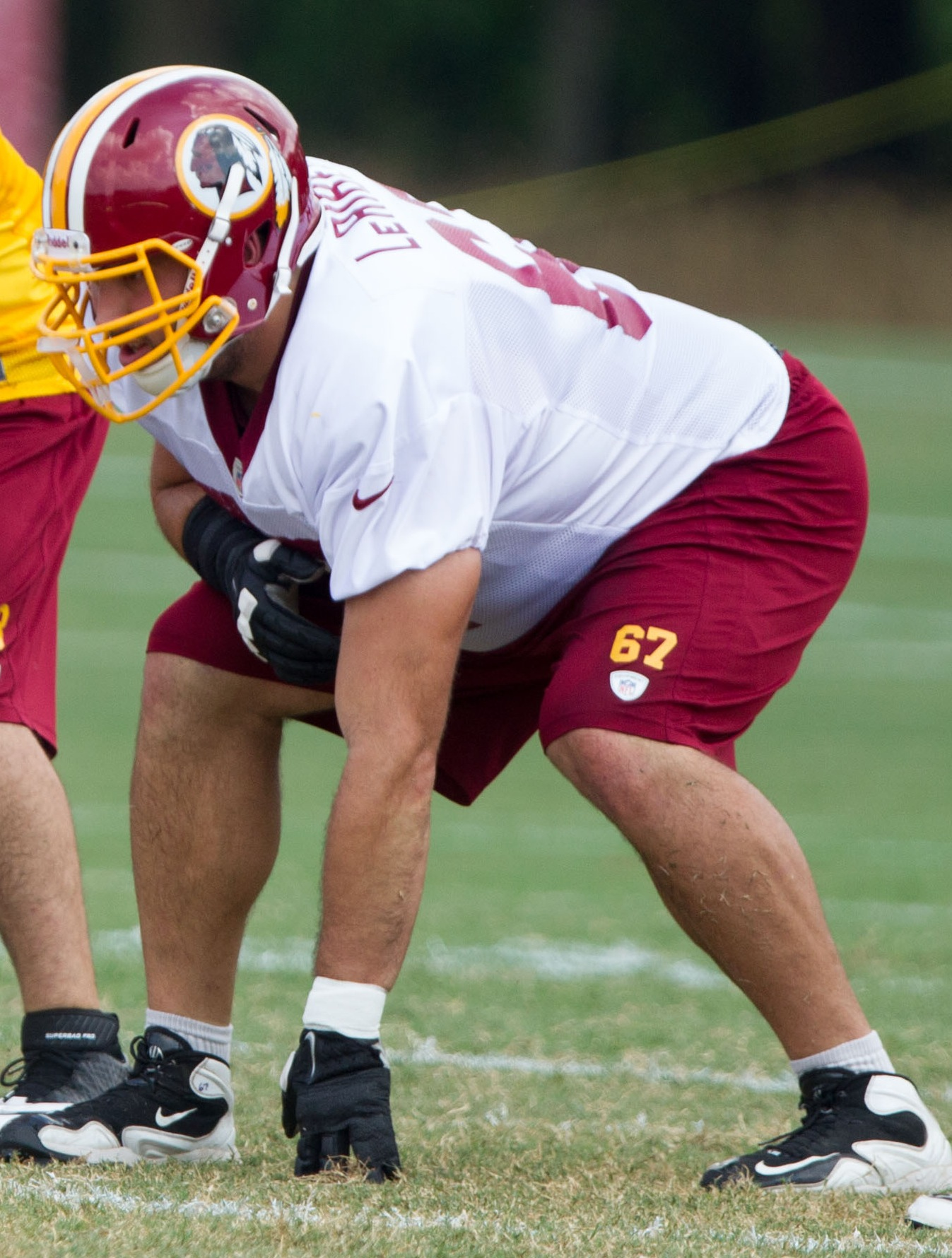
- LeRibeus with the Washington Redskins in 2012

No. 67, 61
- Position: Center

Personal information
- Born: July 2, 1989 (age 37); Houston, Texas, U.S.
- Listed height: 6 ft 2 in (1.88 m)
- Listed weight: 310 lb (141 kg)

Career information
- High school: Berkner (Richardson, Texas)
- College: SMU (2007–2011)
- NFL draft: 2012: 3rd round, 71st overall pick

Career history
- Washington Redskins (2012–2015); Philadelphia Eagles (2017)*; New Orleans Saints (2017–2018); Tampa Bay Buccaneers (2019)*
- * Offseason or practice squad member only

Career NFL statistics
- Games played: 50
- Games started: 15
- Stats at Pro Football Reference

Joshua James LeRibeus (born July 2, 1989) is an American former professional football player who was a center in the National Football League (NFL). He played college football for Southern Methodist University and was selected by the Washington Redskins in third round of the 2012 NFL draft. LeRibeus was also a member of the Philadelphia Eagles, New Orleans Saints, and Tampa Bay Buccaneers.

== Professional career ==
Pre-draft measurables
Height	Weight	Arm length	Hand span	40-yard dash	20-yard shuttle	Three-cone drill	Vertical jump	Broad jump	Bench press
6 ft 3 in (1.91 m)	312 lb (142 kg)	32 1/2 in (0.83 m)	9 3/8 in (0.24 m)	5.37 s	4.65 s	7.64 s	26.0 in (0.66 m)	8 ft 0 in (2.44 m)	29 reps
All values from NFL Combine

=== Washington Redskins ===
LeRibeus was selected 71st overall in the third round of the 2012 NFL draft by the Washington Redskins. While at SMU, he was a teammate of future Redskins teammates Richard Crawford, who the Redskins would later draft in the seventh round, and Aldrick Robinson, who was the Redskins' sixth round pick in 2011. After the Redskins' rookie mini-camp, head coach Mike Shanahan announced that LeRibeus will primarily be playing guard and will be a backup center, providing competition for Erik Cook. On July 18, 2012, he officially signed with the Redskins to a four-year contract. During training camp, he split snaps at the left guard position with Maurice Hurt after Kory Lichtensteiger had arthroscopic surgery on his right knee. He made his NFL debut against the Carolina Panthers in Week 9. Despite playing only five games, Redskins coaching staff believed LeRibeus had a chance to compete for a starting position in the next season.

During the 2013 offseason training camp, LeRibeus came 30 pounds overweight and out of shape. He was listed as inactive for the entire 2013 season.

On March 16, 2016, LeRibeus re-signed with the Redskins. He was released by Washington on September 3.

=== Philadelphia Eagles ===
On January 11, 2017, LeRibeus signed a reserve/future contract with the Philadelphia Eagles. On May 4, he was released by the Eagles.

=== New Orleans Saints ===
On May 15, 2017, LeRibeus signed with the New Orleans Saints.

On May 18, 2018, LeRibeus re-signed with the Saints. He played in six games, starting three at left guard in place of the injured Andrus Peat, before suffering an ankle injury in Week 7. LeRibeus was placed on injured reserve on October 24.

=== Tampa Bay Buccaneers ===
On June 28, 2019, LeRibeus signed with the Tampa Bay Buccaneers. He was released by Tampa Bay during final roster cuts on August 30.
