= Keenan Robinson =

American football player (born 1989)

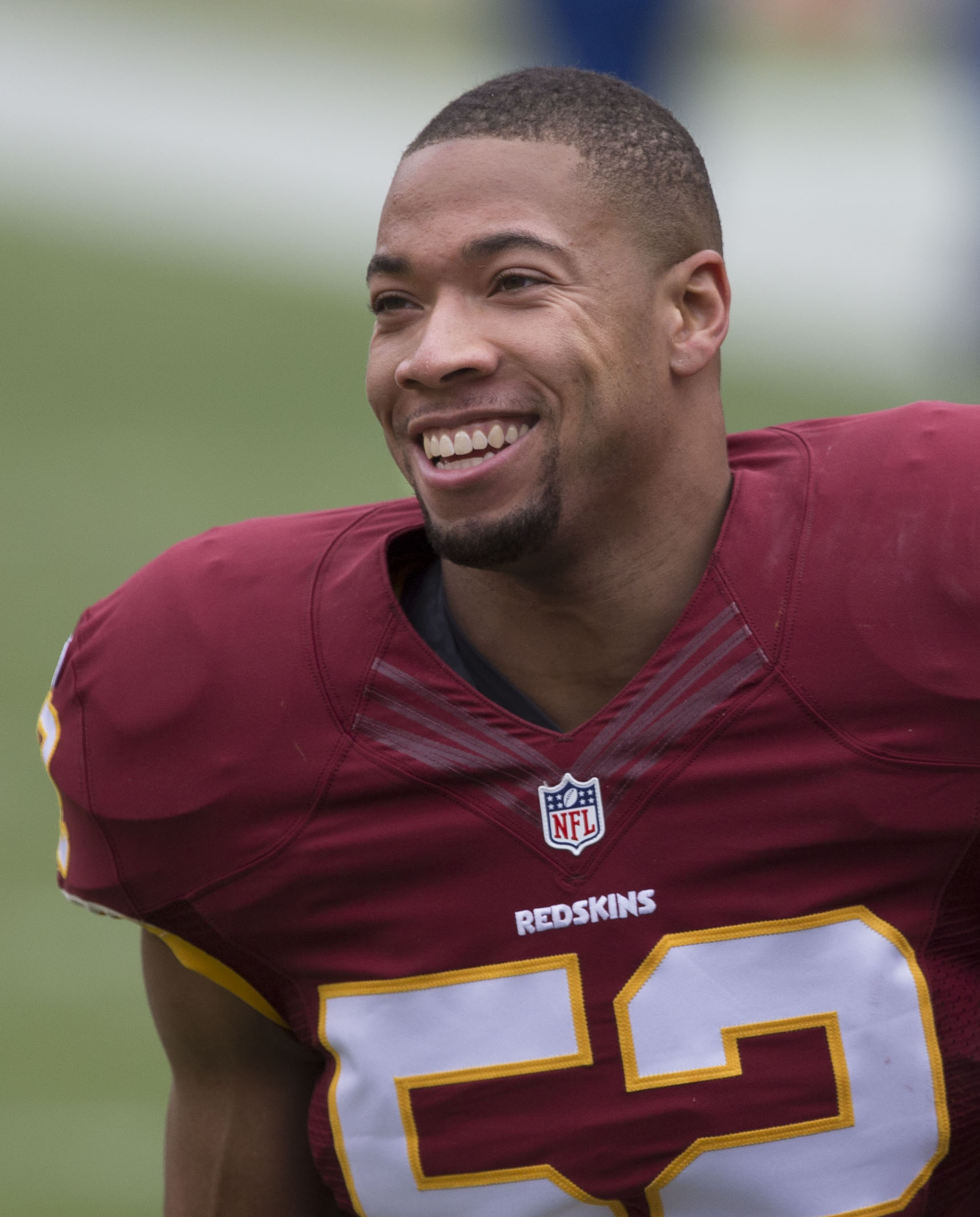
- Robinson with the Washington Redskins in 2014

No. 52, 57, 48
- Position: Linebacker

Personal information
- Born: July 7, 1989 (age 37); Omaha, Nebraska, U.S.
- Listed height: 6 ft 3 in (1.91 m)
- Listed weight: 245 lb (111 kg)

Career information
- High school: Plano East (Plano, Texas)
- College: Texas
- NFL draft: 2012: 4th round, 119th overall pick

Career history
- Washington Redskins (2012–2015); New York Giants (2016–2017); Buffalo Bills (2018)*
- * Offseason or practice squad member only

Awards and highlights
- 2× Second-team All-Big 12 (2010, 2011); 2011 Holiday Bowl Defensive MVP; 2009 Fiesta Bowl champion; 2011 Holiday Bowl champion

Career NFL statistics
- Total tackles: 298
- Sacks: 1.5
- Fumble recoveries: 2
- Interceptions: 2
- Stats at Pro Football Reference

Keenan Robinson (born July 7, 1989) is an American former professional football player who was a linebacker in the National Football League (NFL). He played college football for the Texas Longhorns, and was selected by the Washington Redskins in the fourth round of the 2012 NFL draft. He was also a member of the New York Giants and the Buffalo Bills.

== Early life ==
Born in Omaha, Nebraska, Robinson attended Plano East Senior High School in Plano, Texas, where he played football and ran track. In football, he played linebacker and defensive end, recording 273 career tackles with nine tackles for loss, five sacks, five forced fumbles, five fumble recoveries, six PBU, an interception, and a blocked punt. He was named an All-American by USA Today and Parade in 2006.

In track and field, Robinson was a two-time letterman, and was one of the state's top performers in the triple jump. He won the district triple jump championship as a junior. He got top-jumps of 6.71 meters (21 ft 11 in) in the long jump and 13.88 meters (45 ft 5 in) in the triple jump as a senior. In addition, he ran a 4.5 40-yard dash, bench-pressed 280 pounds and squatted 450 pounds.

Regarded as a four-star recruit by Rivals.com, Robinson was listed as the No. 4 outside linebacker prospect in the class of 2007. He chose Texas over scholarship offers from Oklahoma State and Texas A&M, among others.

== College career ==
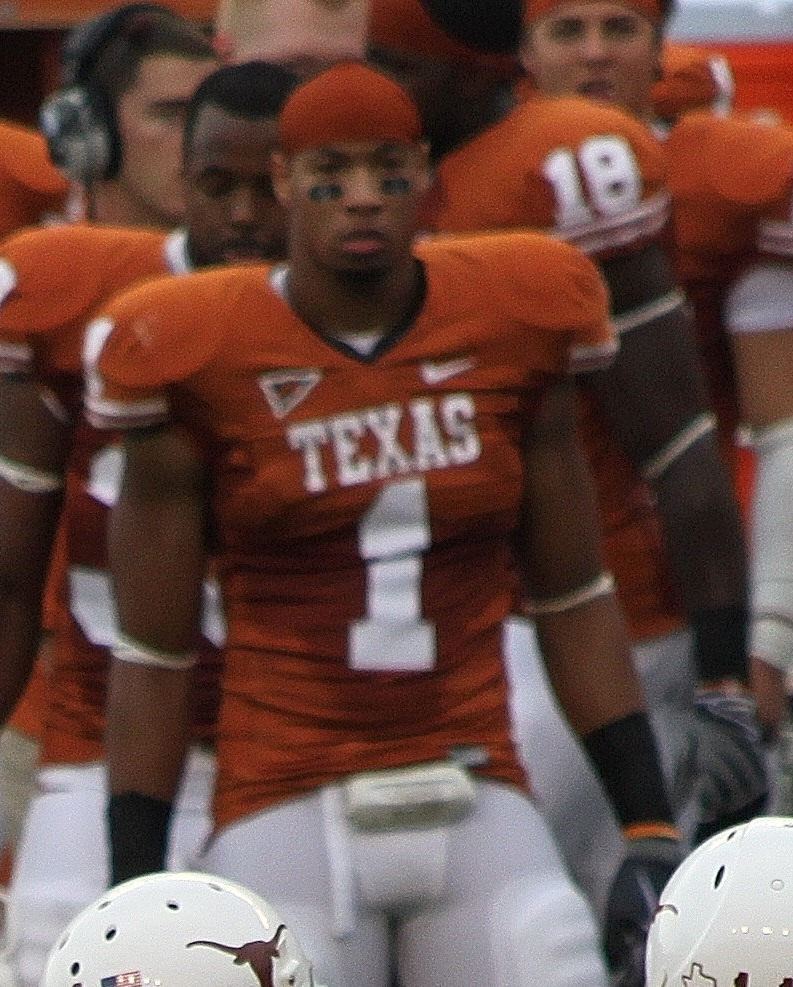
Robinson in 2009

Robinson spent five years at the University of Texas at Austin, where he was a two-time Butkus Award semifinalist, earned 2nd Team All-Big 12 honors and was the 2011 Holiday Bowl Defensive MVP. He was also named to the watch lists for the 2011 Bednarik Award, Nagurski Trophy and Lombardi Award. He redshirted his initial year with the Longhorns and spent the 2008 season mostly on special teams, but became a starter in his sophomore year, playing in 51 games and starting 39 over his career including the Big 12 and BCS Championship games, recording a career high 10 tackles, including a tackle for loss in the first and 7 tackles and a half-sack in the second.

== Professional career ==
Pre-draft measurables
Height	Weight	Arm length	Hand span	40-yard dash	Vertical jump	Broad jump	Bench press
6 ft 3 in (1.91 m)	242 lb (110 kg)	33 in (0.84 m)	9 3/4 in (0.25 m)	4.72 s	36.5 in (0.93 m)	10 ft 5 in (3.18 m)	27 reps
All values from NFL Combine

=== Washington Redskins ===
Robinson was selected in the fourth round of 2012 NFL draft by the Washington Redskins with the 119th overall pick. Defensive coordinator Jim Haslett, announced that Robinson would switch from the outside linebacker position to inside linebacker. On May 17, 2012, he officially signed with the Redskins to a four-year contract. He suffered a tear in his right pectoral muscle in the Week 12 win against the Dallas Cowboys on Thanksgiving. On November 26, 2012, Robinson was placed on injured reserve. Serving as a back-up to Perry Riley and on special teams, he recorded a total of 11 tackles.

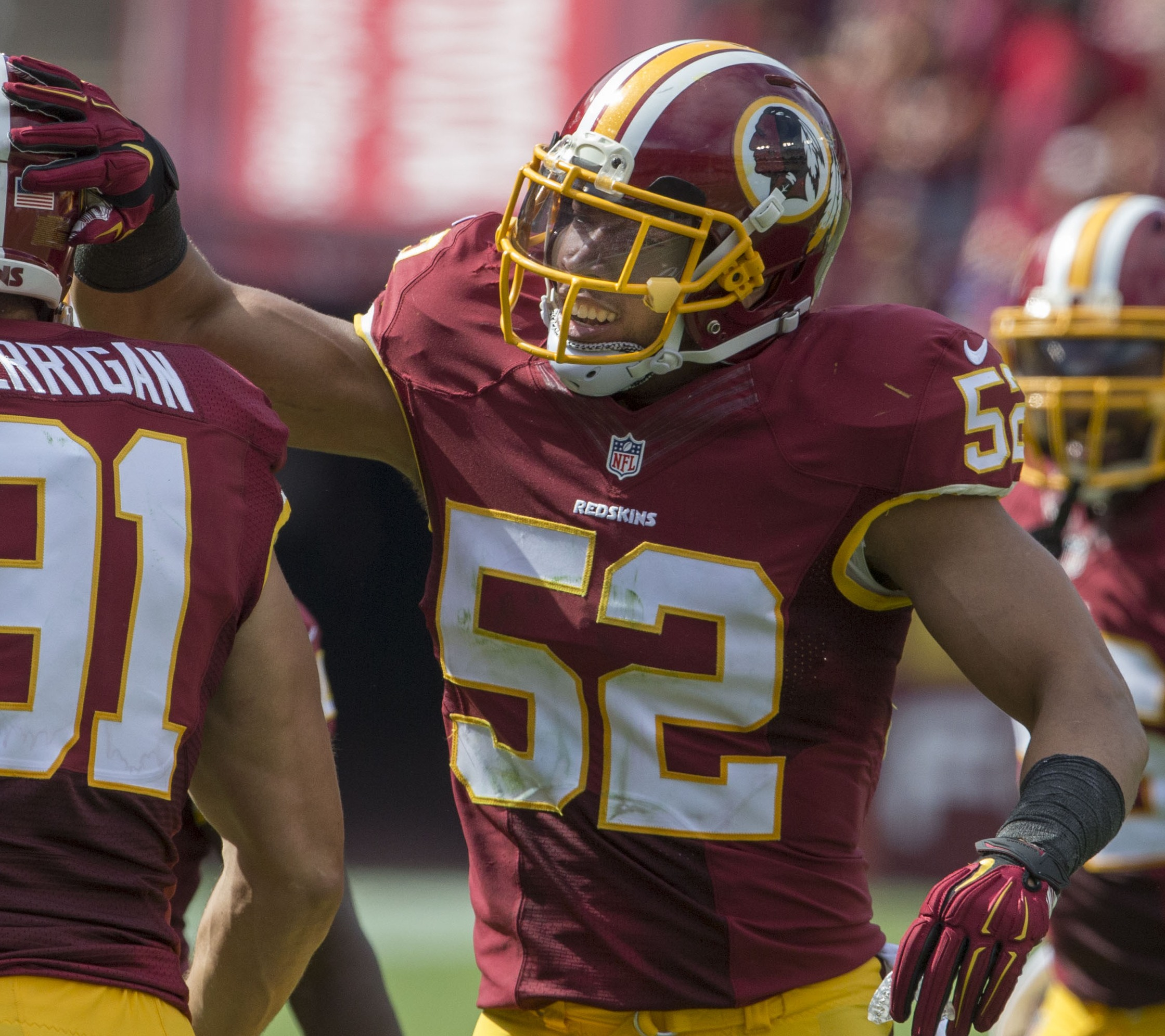
Robinson in 2014

On July 26, 2013, it was announced Robinson tore his left pectoral muscle the first day of training camp for the 2013 season and had expected to be inactive for three to five months. He was officially placed on injured reserve for the second year in a row on August 26.

Robinson became a starter for the 2014 season, following the retirement of London Fletcher. In Week 1 of the 2014 season, he made his first career NFL start, a 17–6 loss against the Houston Texans, in which he recorded a total of 6 tackles. During the Week 4 45–14 loss against the New York Giants, Robinson recorded his first career interception off an Eli Manning pass that was knocked out of the hands of Giants receiver Rueben Randle by Redskins safety Brandon Meriweather, and was then picked off by Robinson. He had also recorded a total of 13 tackles in that game. In a Week 7 19–17 win against the Tennessee Titans, Robinson recorded a career-high 14 total tackles. He was named NFC Defensive Player of the Week for his performance. On Veterans Day 2014, Robinson received the Ed Block Courage Award as he was the Redskins' recipient for the annual award.

In a Week 4, 2015 game against the New England Patriots, Robinson recorded his second career interception against Tom Brady.

=== New York Giants ===
On March 10, 2016, Robinson signed a one-year contract with the New York Giants.

On March 21, 2017, Robinson re-signed with the Giants. He was placed on injured reserve on November 14, 2017 after suffering a quad injury in Week 9.

=== Buffalo Bills ===
On July 24, 2018, Robinson signed with the Buffalo Bills.

On August 23, 2018, Robinson announced his retirement from the NFL.

== NFL career statistics ==
Legend
**Bold**	Career high

=== Regular season ===
Year	Team	Games		Tackles					Interceptions					Fumbles			
Year	Team	GP	GS	Cmb	Solo	Ast	Sck	TFL	Int	Yds	TD	Lng	PD	FF	FR	Yds	TD
2012	WAS	11	0	11	9	2	0.0	0	0	0	0	0	0	0	0	0	0
2014	WAS	13	**13**	**109**	**71**	**38**	**1.5**	**6**	**1**	0	0	0	3	0	**1**	0	0
2015	WAS	12	8	63	36	27	0.0	1	**1**	**44**	0	**44**	3	0	**1**	0	0
2016	NYG	**16**	6	83	54	29	0.0	2	0	0	0	0	**7**	0	0	0	0
2017	NYG	6	3	32	20	12	0.0	0	0	0	0	0	0	0	0	0	0
		58	30	298	190	108	1.5	9	2	44	0	44	15	0	2	0	0

=== Playoffs ===
Year	Team	Games		Tackles					Interceptions					Fumbles			
Year	Team	GP	GS	Cmb	Solo	Ast	Sck	TFL	Int	Yds	TD	Lng	PD	FF	FR	Yds	TD
2015	WAS	**1**	0	0	0	0	0.0	0	0	0	0	0	0	0	0	0	0
2016	NYG	**1**	**1**	**6**	**4**	**2**	0.0	**1**	0	0	0	0	**1**	0	0	0	0
		2	1	6	4	2	0.0	1	0	0	0	0	1	0	0	0	0
