= Dorson Boyce =

American football player (born 1988)

Profile
- Position: Fullback

Personal information
- Born: June 25, 1988 (age 38); New York City, New York
- Listed height: 6 ft 2 in (1.88 m)
- Listed weight: 250 lb (113 kg)

Career information
- College: Washington
- NFL draft: 2011: undrafted

Career history
- Seattle Seahawks (2011)*; Washington Redskins (2012) (2013)*; Cleveland Browns(2014)*
- * Offseason or practice squad member only

Career NFL statistics
- Rushing yards: 0
- Rushing TDs: 0
- Stats at Pro Football Reference

Dorson Boyce (born June 25, 1988) is currently a retired American fullback. He was signed by the Seattle Seahawks as an undrafted free agent in 2011. He played college football at the University of Washington. He was also a member of the Washington Redskins.

== Professional career ==
=== Seattle Seahawks ===
Boyce was signed by the Seattle Seahawks as an undrafted free agent following the end of the NFL lockout in 2011. He was waived on August 16, 2011, but re-signed on August 18.

=== Washington Redskins ===
Boyce signed with the Washington Redskins on July 25, 2012. He was waived-injured on August 31, 2012. After clearing waivers, he was officially added to the injured reserve list on September 3.

He was released on June 13, 2013.
