= Tom Compton =

American football player (born 1989)

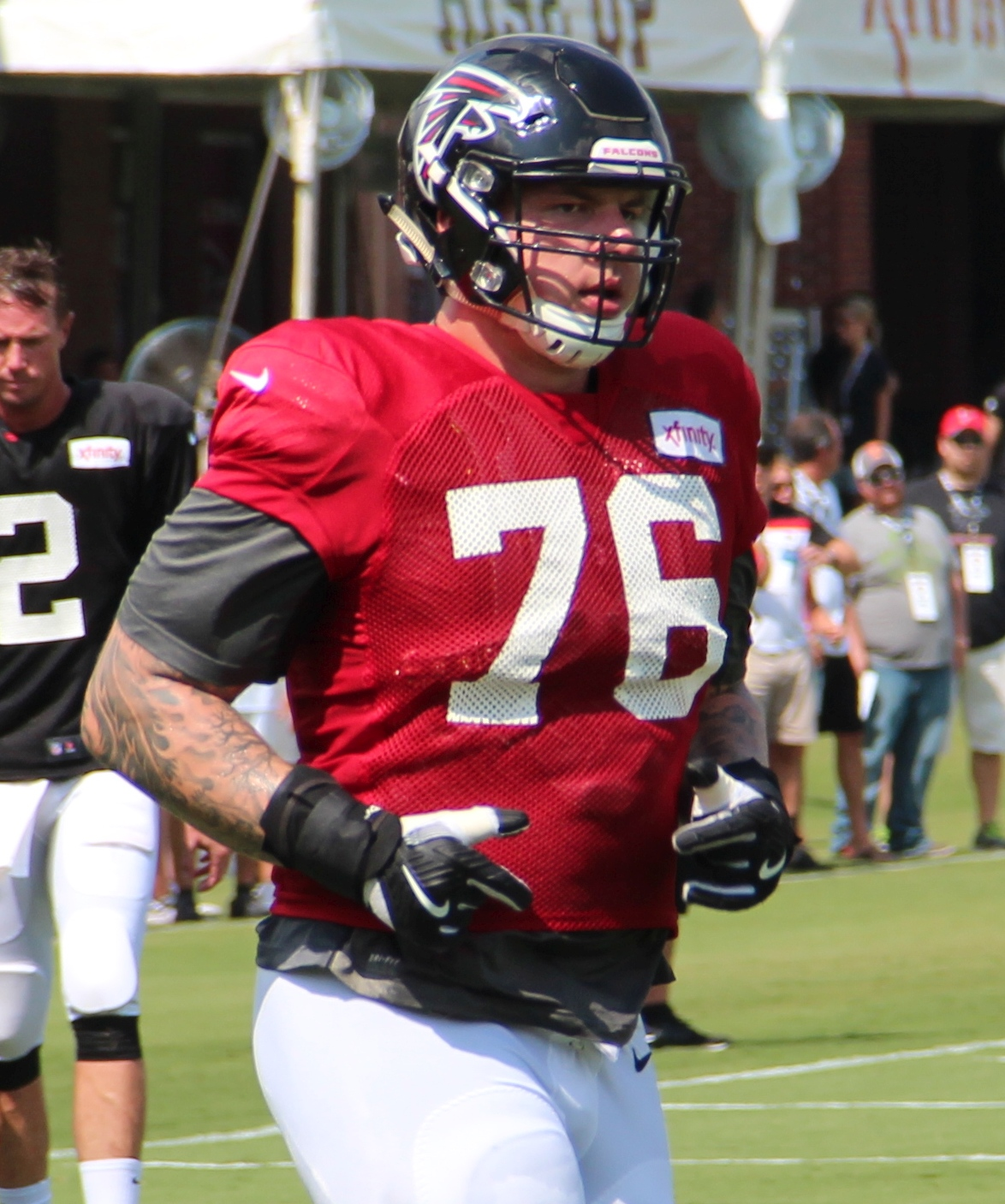
- Compton with the Atlanta Falcons in 2016

No. 66, 68, 69, 76, 77, 79
- Position: Offensive tackle

Personal information
- Born: May 10, 1989 (age 37); Rosemount, Minnesota, U.S.
- Listed height: 6 ft 6 in (1.98 m)
- Listed weight: 315 lb (143 kg)

Career information
- High school: Rosemount
- College: South Dakota
- NFL draft: 2012: 6th round, 193rd overall pick

Career history
- Washington Redskins (2012–2015); Atlanta Falcons (2016); Chicago Bears (2017); Minnesota Vikings (2018); New York Jets (2019); San Francisco 49ers (2020–2021); Denver Broncos (2022)

Awards and highlights
- FCS All-American (2011); 2× First-team All-GWC (2010, 2011)

Career NFL statistics
- Games played: 124
- Games started: 44
- Stats at Pro Football Reference

Thomas Andrew Compton (born May 10, 1989) is an American former professional football player who was an offensive tackle in the National Football League (NFL). He played college football for the South Dakota Coyotes and was selected by the Washington Redskins in the sixth round of the 2012 NFL draft. Compton has also played for the Atlanta Falcons, Chicago Bears, Minnesota Vikings, New York Jets, San Francisco 49ers and Denver Broncos.

== Early life ==
A native of the suburb Rosemount, Minnesota, Compton attended Rosemount High School, where he was a two-year starter on the offensive line and led the team to the section championship and state semifinals.

== College career ==
At the University of South Dakota, Compton was a three-time Great West Conference selection—honorable mention in 2009 and consecutive first team selections in 2010, 2011—and 2011 GWC Offensive Lineman of the Year. After his senior season, he played at the 2012 East–West Shrine Game.

== Professional career ==
=== Pre-draft ===
Compton was invited to the 2012 NFL Combine, where he was listed as the No. 9 offensive guard prospect. Projected as a fourth round selection by Sports Illustrated, Compton was ranked as the No. 8 offensive guard available in the 2012 NFL draft.

Pre-draft measurables
Height	Weight	Arm length	Hand span	40-yard dash	20-yard shuttle	Three-cone drill	Vertical jump	Broad jump	Bench press
6 ft 4 7/8 in (1.95 m)	314 lb (142 kg)	34 in (0.86 m)	10 in (0.25 m)	5.11 s	4.60 s	7.59 s	30.0 in (0.76 m)	9 ft 0 in (2.74 m)	20 reps
All values from NFL Combine

=== Washington Redskins ===
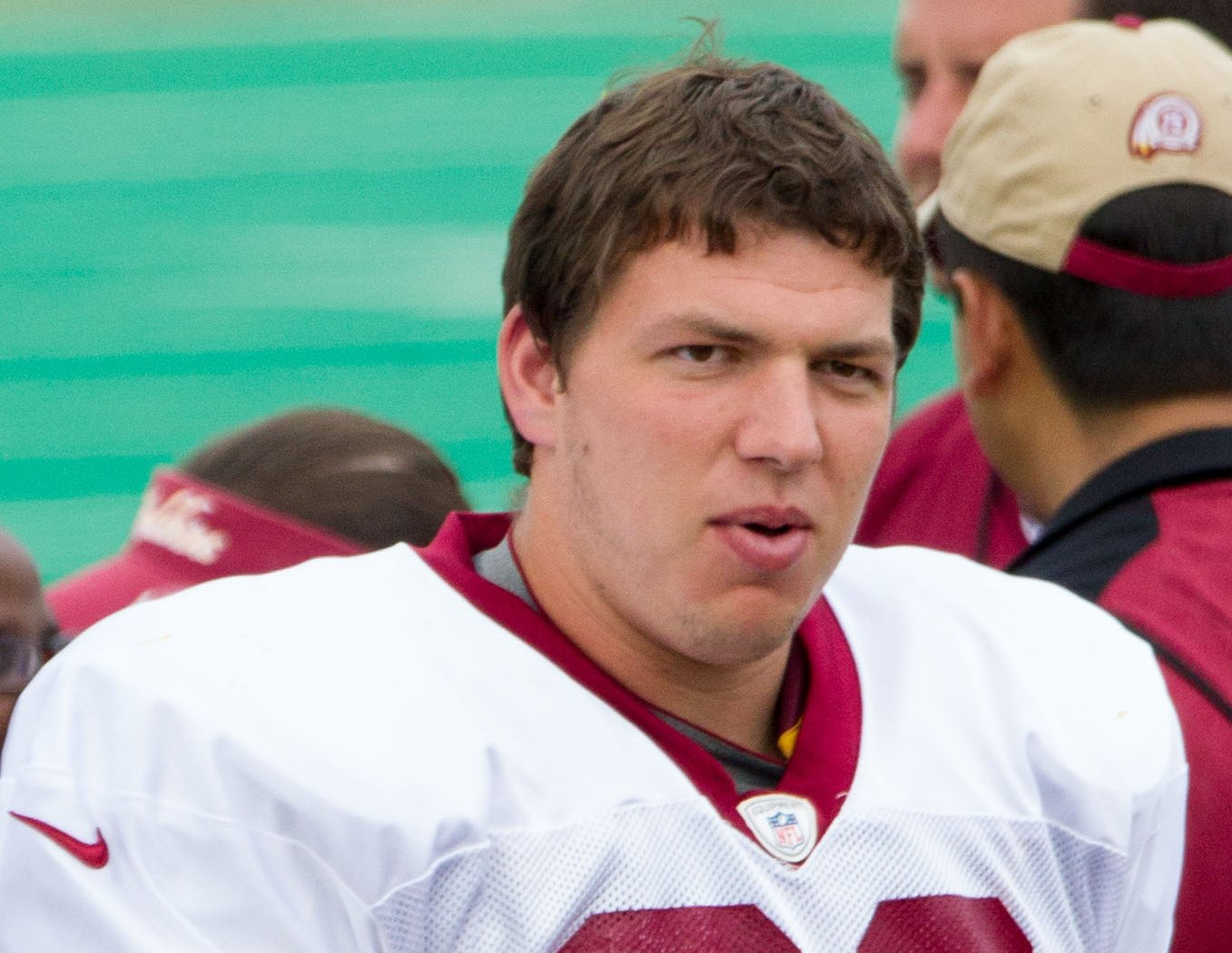
Compton at Redskins training camp in 2012

Compton was selected in the sixth round of 2012 NFL draft by the Washington Redskins. He was the first South Dakota Coyote drafted since Chul Schwanke in 1986. He was officially signed by the Redskins to a four-year contract on May 6, 2012. Compton was cut on August 31, 2012, for final cuts before the start of the 2012 season. After not being claimed off waivers, he was signed to the team's practice squad the next day.

On December 5, 2012, it was announced that Compton had been promoted to the Redskins 53-man roster after the Redskins placed cornerback Cedric Griffin on the suspended list. He became the starting right tackle midway through the 2014 season, after the incumbent Tyler Polumbus was benched following poor performance.

The Redskins re-signed Compton on February 27, 2015.

=== Atlanta Falcons ===
Compton signed with the Atlanta Falcons on March 15, 2016.

In the 2016 season, Compton and the Falcons reached Super Bowl LI, where they faced the New England Patriots on February 5, 2017. Compton played in ten offensive snaps in the game and appeared on special teams. In the Super Bowl, the Falcons lost 28–34 in overtime, despite having a 25-point lead.

=== Chicago Bears ===
Compton signed with the Chicago Bears on March 11, 2017.

=== Minnesota Vikings ===
On March 22, 2018, Compton signed with the Minnesota Vikings, re-uniting with Kirk Cousins. He started 14 games at left guard, missing two with a knee injury.

=== New York Jets ===
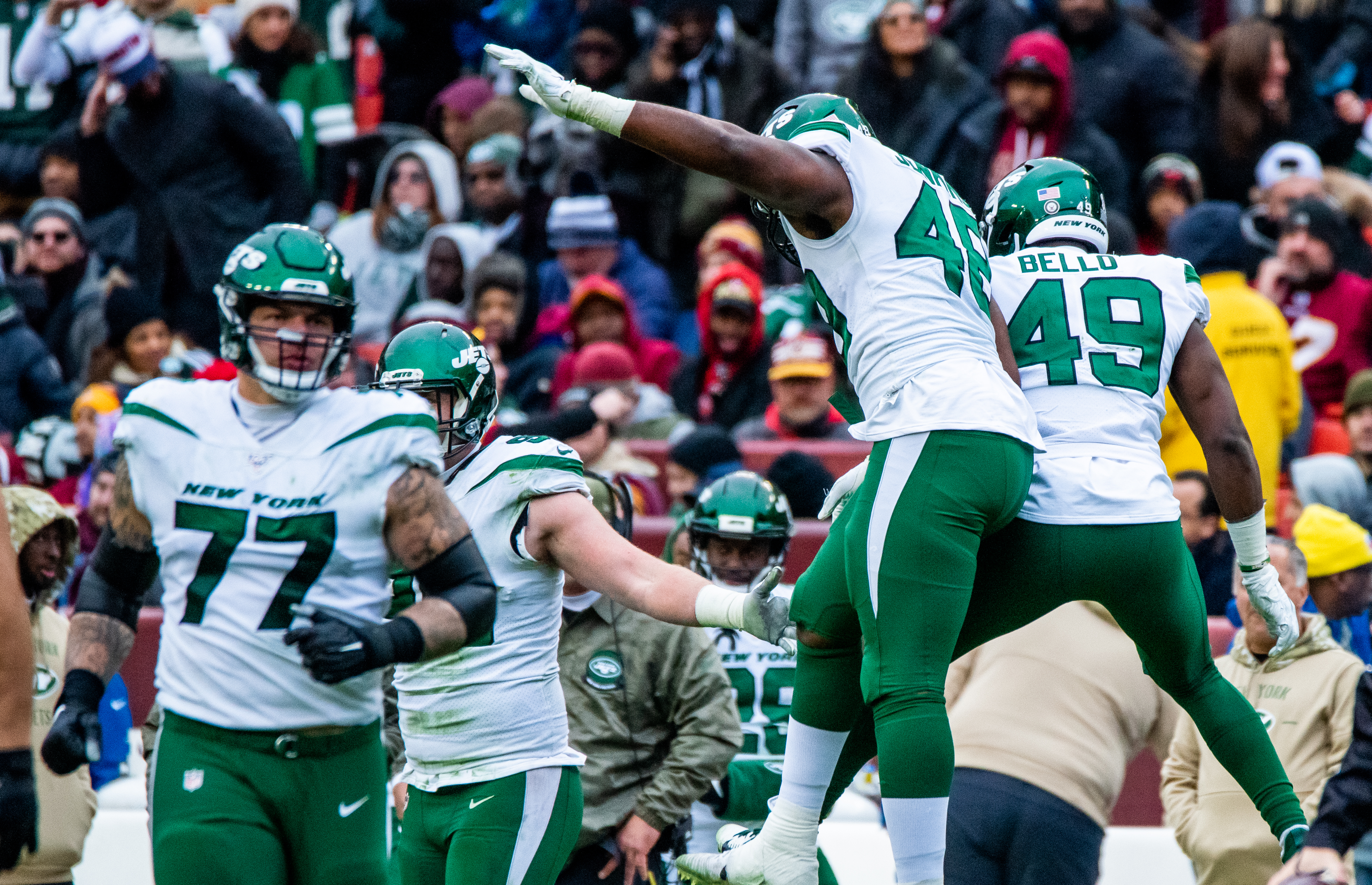
Compton in a game against the Washington Redskins

On March 18, 2019, Compton signed with the New York Jets. After beginning the season as a backup, Compton was named the starting right guard in Week 11 following an injury to Brian Winters. He started five games before being placed on injured reserve on December 28, 2019.

=== San Francisco 49ers ===
On April 3, 2020, Compton signed a one-year contract with the San Francisco 49ers. The signing reunited Compton with San Francisco 49ers' head coach Kyle Shanahan, who previously was the offensive coordinator with the Washington Redskins and Atlanta Falcons. He was placed on injured reserve on December 12, 2020. He was activated on January 2, 2021.

Compton re-signed with the 49ers on a one-year contract on April 28, 2021.

=== Denver Broncos ===
On March 17, 2022, Compton signed a one-year contract with the Denver Broncos. He was placed on the reserve/PUP list to start the season on August 23, 2022. He was activated on November 15. He was placed on injured reserve on December 22.

== Personal life ==
Compton played a reporter in the 2015 movie Sharknado 3: Oh Hell No!.

Compton is the cousin of fellow NFL player, Will Compton.

Compton is married to his wife Tiffany Compton. She is a co-founder of Elliot Tate Designs and social media content creator. They have two children together.
