= 2013 Washington Redskins season =

NFL team season

- Owner: Daniel Snyder
- General manager: Bruce Allen
- Head coach: Mike Shanahan
- Offensive coordinator: Kyle Shanahan
- Defensive coordinator: Jim Haslett
- Home stadium: FedExField

Results
- Record: 3–13
- Division place: 4th NFC East
- Playoffs: Did not qualify
- Pro Bowlers: OT Trent Williams; RB Alfred Morris; LB Brian Orakpo

Uniform
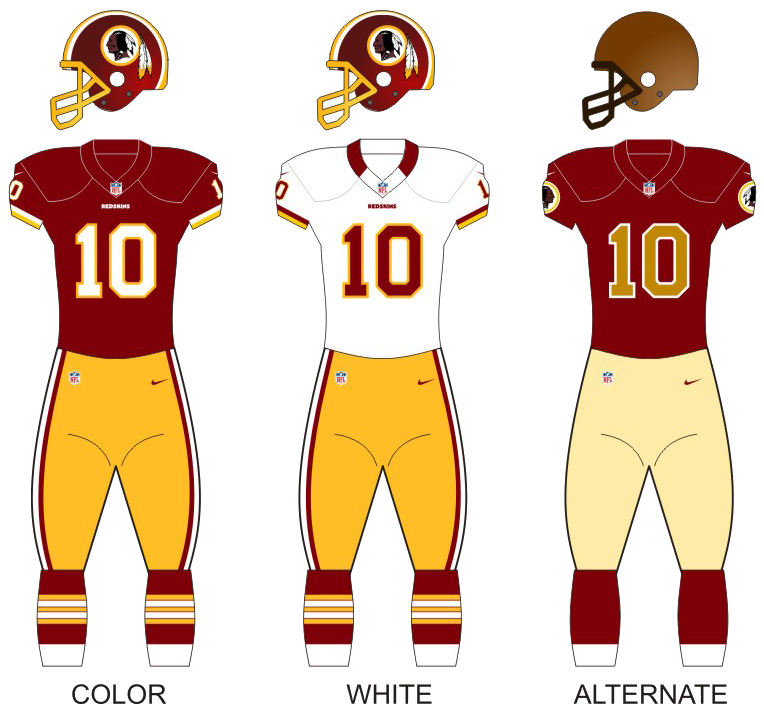

The 2013 season was the Washington Redskins' 82nd in the National Football League (NFL). They failed to improve on their 10–6 regular season record from 2012, and suffered through a 3–13 season, which was the worst record that the team had posted since 1994, resulting in the firing of head coach Mike Shanahan and most of his staff after four seasons.

The 2013 Redskins struggled mightily in part because of the regression from quarterback Robert Griffin III, who suffered a devastating knee injury in the previous years' playoffs and whose playstyle shifted to accommodate the injury, leading to less than desirable results. The team was also notable for having one of the worst special teams units in league history, and this played a major role in several of their losses. Football Outsiders listed the 2013 Redskins as having the second-worst special teams unit they had ever tracked.

While not at the time, this team would go on to be known for its coaching staff. The 2013 Redskins' coaching staff produced four future head coaches: wide receivers coach Mike McDaniel with the Dolphins, offensive coordinator Kyle Shanahan with the 49ers, tight ends coach Sean McVay with the Rams, and quarterbacks coach Matt LaFleur with the Packers. Raheem Morris and defensive coordinator Jim Haslett had both also been former NFL head coaches as of that season.

== Offseason ==
=== Signings ===
Pos.	Player	2012 Team	Contract
CB	E.J. Biggers	Tampa Bay Buccaneers	1 year, $1.5 million
LB	Nick Barnett	Buffalo Bills	1 year, $940,000
DE	Darryl Tapp	Philadelphia Eagles	1 year, $865,000
S	Jose Gumbs	Kansas City Chiefs	

=== Re-signings ===
Pos.	Player	Contract
DT	Kedric Golston	3 years, $3.3 million
TE	Fred Davis	1 year, $2.5 million
QB	Rex Grossman	1 year, $960,000
CB	DeAngelo Hall	1 year, $1.2 million
K	Sav Rocca	2 years, $2.2 million
LB	Bryan Kehl	1 year, $740,000

=== Departures ===
Pos.	Player	2013 Team
LB	Lorenzo Alexander	Arizona Cardinals
TE	DeAngelo Peterson	Denver Broncos
OT	Jeremy Trueblood	Atlanta Falcons
OT	Jammal Brown	
WR	Devery Henderson	
OT	Jordan Black	
WR	Donté Stallworth	
TE	Chris Cooley	
QB	Pat White	
DE	Phillip Merling	

== 2013 draft class ==
Round	Selection	Player	Position	College
1	22	^{[a]}		
2	51	David Amerson	Cornerback	NC State
3	85	Jordan Reed	Tight End	Florida
4	119	Phillip Thomas	Safety	Fresno State
5	154	Chris Thompson	Running Back	Florida State
5	162^{[b]}	Brandon Jenkins	Outside Linebacker	Florida State
6	191	Bacarri Rambo	Safety	Georgia
7	228	Jawan Jamison	Running Back	Rutgers

Notes

^{^[a]} The team traded its first-round selection (No. 22 overall) in 2013, along with its first- and second-round selections in 2012 and its and 2014 first-round selection to the St. Louis Rams in exchange for the Rams' 2012 first-round selection.
^{^[b]} The team acquired this fifth-round selection in a 2011 trade that sent defensive tackle Albert Haynesworth to the New England Patriots.

== Personnel ==
=== Staff / Coaches ===
2013 Washington Redskins staff
Front office: Owner – Daniel Snyder; General manager – Bruce Allen; Executive vice president – Mike Shanahan; Senior executive – A. J. Smith; Vice president of football administration – Eric Schaffer; Director of player personnel – Scott Campbell; Director of pro personnel – Morocco Brown; Head coaches: Head coach – Mike Shanahan; Assistant head coach/running backs – Bobby Turner; Offensive coaches: Offensive coordinator – Kyle Shanahan; Quarterbacks – Matt LaFleur; Wide receivers – Mike McDaniel; Tight ends – Sean McVay; Offensive line – Chris Foerster; Assistant offensive line – Chris Morgan; Offensive assistant – Aubrey Pleasant; Offensive quality control – Richmond Flowers III	Defensive coaches: Defensive coordinator – Jim Haslett; Defensive line – Jacob Burney; Linebackers – Bob Slowik; Defensive backs – Raheem Morris; Assistant defensive backs/special teams assistant – Richard Hightower; Defensive assistant – Bobby Slowik; Special teams coaches: Special teams coordinator – Keith Burns; Strength and conditioning: Director of player performance – Malcolm Blacken; Head strength and conditioning – Ray Wright; Assistant strength and conditioning – Chad Englehart

=== Final roster ===
2013 Washington Redskins roster
Quarterbacks (QB): 12 Kirk Cousins; 10 Robert Griffin III; 8 Rex Grossman; Running backs (RB): 29 Roy Helu; 47 Jawan Jamison; 46 Alfred Morris; 36 Darrel Young; Wide receivers (WR): 17 Josh Bellamy; 88 Pierre Garçon; 15 Josh Morgan; 89 Santana Moss; 11 Aldrick Robinson; 13 Nick Williams; Tight ends (TE): 83 Fred Davis; 84 Niles Paul; 82 Logan Paulsen	Offensive linemen (OL): 66 Chris Chester G; 68 Tom Compton T; 73 Adam Gettis G; 67 Josh LeRibeus C/G; 78 Kory Lichtensteiger G; 63 Will Montgomery C; 74 Tyler Polumbus T; 60 J. D. Walton C; 71 Trent Williams T; Defensive linemen (DL): 92 Chris Baker DE; 96 Barry Cofield NT; 64 Kedric Golston DE; 99 Jarvis Jenkins DE; 95 Chris Neild NT; 54 Darryl Tapp DE	Linebackers (LB): 53 Will Compton ILB; 59 London Fletcher ILB; 58 Josh Hull ILB; 50 Rob Jackson OLB; 51 Brandon Jenkins OLB; 91 Ryan Kerrigan OLB; 98 Brian Orakpo OLB; 56 Perry Riley ILB; 97 Adrian Robinson OLB; Defensive backs (DB): 39 David Amerson CB/S; 30 E. J. Biggers CB/FS; 37 Reed Doughty SS; 48 Jose Gumbs SS; 23 DeAngelo Hall CB; 31 Brandon Meriweather FS; 25 Chase Minnifield CB; 24 Bacarri Rambo FS; 34 Trenton Robinson SS; 26 Josh Wilson CB; Special teams (ST): 2 Kai Forbath K; 40 Kyle Nelson LS; 6 Sav Rocca P	Practice squad: 76 Dominique Hamilton DE; 93 DaJohn Harris DE; 61 Troy Kropog T; 38 Miguel Maysonet RB; 35 Davin Meggett RB; 87 Gabe Miller TE; 62 Tevita Stevens C; 32 Peyton Thompson S; Reserve: 55 Nick Barnett ILB (IR); 72 Stephen Bowen DE (IR); 19 Dezmon Briscoe WR (IR); 94 Adam Carriker DE (PUP); 20 Richard Crawford CB (IR); 85 Leonard Hankerson WR (IR); 79 Maurice Hurt G (IR); 34 Tanard Jackson FS (Susp.); 53 Bryan Kehl ILB (IR); 47 Jeremy Kimbrough ILB (IR); 86 Jordan Reed TE (IR); 52 Keenan Robinson ILB (IR); 22 Evan Royster RB (IR); 57 Nick Sundberg LS (IR); 41 Phillip Thomas SS (IR); 25 Chris Thompson RB (IR); 90 Doug Worthington DE (IR); Rookies in italics 53 active, 17 reserve, 8 practice squad

== Schedule ==
=== Preseason ===
The Redskins' finished the preseason going undefeated for the first time since the 1985 preseason.

Week	Date	Opponent	Result	Record	Venue	Recap
1	August 8	at Tennessee Titans	**W** 22–21	1–0	LP Field	Recap
2	August 19	Pittsburgh Steelers	**W** 24–13	2–0	FedExField	Recap
3	August 24	Buffalo Bills	**W** 30–7	3–0	FedEx Field	Recap
4	August 29	at Tampa Bay Buccaneers	**W** 30–12	4–0	Raymond James Stadium	Recap

=== Regular season ===
Week	Date	Opponent	Result	Record	Venue	Recap
1	September 9	**Philadelphia Eagles**	**L** 27–33	0–1	FedExField	Recap
2	September 15	at Green Bay Packers	**L** 20–38	0–2	Lambeau Field	Recap
3	September 22	Detroit Lions	**L** 20–27	0–3	FedExField	Recap
4	September 29	at Oakland Raiders	**W** 24–14	1–3	O.co Coliseum	Recap
5	Bye					
6	October 13	at **Dallas Cowboys**	**L** 16–31	1–4	AT&T Stadium	Recap
7	October 20	Chicago Bears	**W** 45–41	2–4	FedExField	Recap
8	October 27	at Denver Broncos	**L** 21–45	2–5	Sports Authority Field at Mile High	Recap
9	November 3	San Diego Chargers	**W** 30–24 (OT)	3–5	FedExField	Recap
10	November 7	at Minnesota Vikings	**L** 27–34	3–6	Mall of America Field	Recap
11	November 17	at **Philadelphia Eagles**	**L** 16–24	3–7	Lincoln Financial Field	Recap
12	November 25	San Francisco 49ers	**L** 6–27	3–8	FedExField	Recap
13	December 1	**New York Giants**	**L** 17–24	3–9	FedExField	Recap
14	December 8	Kansas City Chiefs	**L** 10–45	3–10	FedExField	Recap
15	December 15	at Atlanta Falcons	**L** 26–27	3–11	Georgia Dome	Recap
16	December 22	**Dallas Cowboys**	**L** 23–24	3–12	FedExField	Recap
17	December 29	at **New York Giants**	**L** 6–20	3–13	MetLife Stadium	Recap

Note: Intra-division opponents are in bold text.

=== Game summaries ===
==== Week 1: vs. Philadelphia Eagles ====
Week 1: Philadelphia Eagles at Washington Redskins – Game summary

Quarter	1	2	3	4	Total
**Eagles**	12	14	7	0	**33**
Redskins	7	0	7	13	**27**

at FedExField, Landover, Maryland

- Date: September 9
- Game time: 7:10 p.m. EDT
- Game weather: 80 °F (27 °C), cloudy
- Game attendance: 82,743
- Referee: Ron Winter
- TV announcers (ESPN): Mike Tirico, Jon Gruden and Lisa Salters
- Recap, Game book

Game information

**First quarter**

- WAS – DeAngelo Hall 75-yard fumble return (Kai Forbath kick), 11:54. Redskins 7–0.
- PHI – Alex Henery 48-yard field goal, 9:20. Redskins 7–3. **Drive: 9 plays, 51 yards, 2:39.**
- PHI – DeSean Jackson 25-yard pass from Michael Vick (Alex Henery kick), 9:07. Eagles 10–7. **Drive: 1 play, 25 yards, 0:08.**
- PHI – Alfred Morris tackled in the end zone by Trent Cole for a safety, 4:56. Eagles 12–7.

**Second quarter**

- PHI – Brent Celek 28-yard pass from Michael Vick (Alex Henery kick), 6:18. Eagles 19–7. **Drive: 5 plays, 62 yards, 2:07.**
- PHI – Michael Vick 3-yard run (Alex Henery kick), 1:02. Eagles 26–7. **Drive: 9 plays, 44 yards, 3:13.**

**Third quarter**

- PHI – LeSean McCoy 34-yard run (Alex Henery kick), 13:35. Eagles 33–7. **Drive: 2 plays, 30 yards, 0:34.**
- WAS – Alfred Morris 5-yard run (Kai Forbath kick), 0:11. Eagles 33–14. **Drive: 8 plays, 66 yards, 3:30.**

**Fourth quarter**

- WAS – Leonard Hankerson 10-yard pass from Robert Griffin III (pass failed), 12:29. Eagles 33–20. **Drive: 4 plays, 29 yards, 1:22.**
- WAS – Leonard Hankerson 24-yard pass from Robert Griffin III (Kai Forbath kick), 1:20. Eagles 33–27. **Drive: 9 plays, 89 yards, 2:28.**

**Top passers**

- PHI – Michael Vick – 15/25, 203 yards, 2 TD
- WAS – Robert Griffin III – 30/49, 329 yards, 2 TD, 2 INT

**Top rushers**

- PHI – LeSean McCoy – 31 rushes, 184 yards, TD
- WAS – Alfred Morris – 12 rushes, 45 yards, TD

**Top receivers**

- PHI – DeSean Jackson – 7 receptions, 104 yards, TD
- WAS – Leonard Hankerson – 5 receptions, 80 yards, 2 TD

With the much-anticipated return of quarterback Robert Griffin III, Washington began its 2013 campaign on Monday Night Football against the Chip Kelly coached Philadelphia Eagles, seeking a third straight win against Philadelphia.

Philadelphia got the ball first, and approached Washington's red zone, however Eagles quarterback Michael Vick threw a backward pass that was ruled a fumble, and recovered by Redskins cornerback DeAngelo Hall who raced to the opposite end zone to give Washington a 7–0 lead. The Eagles got the ball back, and moved into scoring range, but could not punch it in and settled for an Alex Henery 48-yard field goal to cut the Redskins' lead to 7–3. Washington's offense finally possessed the ball, but running back Alfred Morris fumbled, giving possession right back to Philadelphia. Vick would make Washington pay, finding wide receiver DeSean Jackson for a 25-yard touchdown, and a 10–7 Eagles lead. After a poor kick return, Washington found themselves backed up in their own end, and Griffin and Morris exchanged a poor option pitch, and Morris fumbled in the end zone, forced to fall on it and giving Philadelphia a safety. The first quarter ended without any further scoring, and Philadelphia led 12–7.

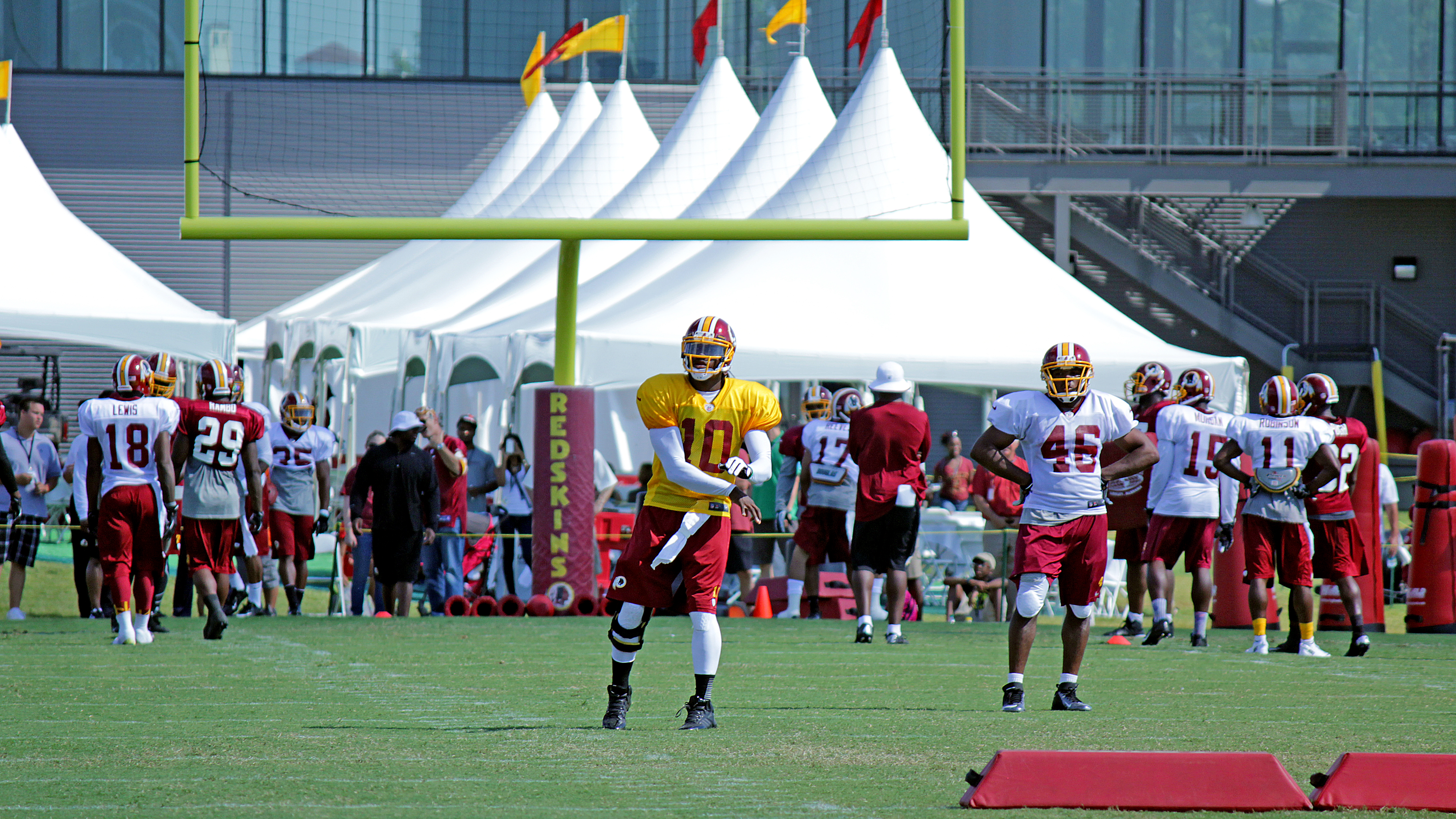
Washington players at training camp in Richmond, Virginia in July 2013

In the second, Washington's offense continued to sputter, and Philadelphia's offense continued to click. Vick would find tight end Brent Celek for a 28-yard score, and Vick would, after another Redskins punt, run for a 3-yard score to go up 26–7 as the teams headed to the locker room. Philadelphia's offense gained 331 yards of total offense in the first half alone.

Washington got the ball to start the third, and on the third play from scrimmage, Griffin III threw an ill-advised pass to Santana Moss, and was intercepted again. Philadelphia would score again, with running back LeSean McCoy racing for a 34-yard score and a 33–7 Philadelphia lead. Washington finally got their offense moving, but their drive went for naught, as Kai Forbath, who missed only one field goal in all of 2012, missed. Philadelphia punted again, and on Washington's ensuing possession, they were able to finish a drive. With seconds remaining in the third, Morris scored from 5 yards out, to cut the Philadelphia advantage to 33–14.

After a Philadelphia punt in the fourth, Washington's offense gained possession again. A solid, methodical drive ensued, with Griffin finding Leonard Hankerson for a 10-yard score, but a failed two-point conversion left the score at 33–20. After another Philadelphia punt, Washington got the ball back again, but could not convert a 4th-and-15, as Aldrick Robinson could not haul in the pass. Philadelphia was able to wind the majority of the clock down, but not all of it. Washington got the ball back again, and Griffin found Hankerson a second time to cut the score to 33–27. Needing an onside kick recovery to finish their comeback, it fell short as Jason Avant fell on the kick, and Philadelphia knelt down to seal their win.

With the loss, Washington began the season 0–1 for the first time since 2009, lost their home opener for a second consecutive year, lost to Philadelphia for the first time since 2011, fell to 0–1 in the NFC East, and lost a regular season game for the first time since Week 9 of last season against Carolina.

==== Week 2: at Green Bay Packers ====
Week 2: Washington Redskins at Green Bay Packers – Game summary

Quarter	1	2	3	4	Total
Redskins	0	0	7	13	**20**
**Packers**	10	14	14	0	**38**

at Lambeau Field, Green Bay, Wisconsin

- Date: September 15
- Game time: 1:00 pm. EDT/12:00 p.m. CDT
- Game weather: 56 °F (13 °C), rain
- Game attendance: 78,020
- Referee: Tony Corrente
- TV announcers (Fox): Joe Buck, Troy Aikman and Pam Oliver
- Recap, Game book

Game information

**First quarter**

- GB – Mason Crosby 28-yard field goal, 8:05. Packers 3–0. **Drive: 14 plays, 70 yards, 6:58.**
- GB – Randall Cobb 35-yard pass from Aaron Rodgers (Mason Crosby kick), 2:34. Packers 10–0. **Drive: 4 plays, 42 yards, 0:41.**

**Second quarter**

- GB – Jordy Nelson 14-yard pass from Aaron Rodgers (Mason Crosby kick), 11:44. Packers 17–0. **Drive: 8 plays, 75 yards, 3:13.**
- GB – Jermichael Finley 3-yard pass from Aaron Rodgers (Mason Crosby kick), 7:13. Packers 24–0. **Drive: 6 plays, 90 yards, 2:57.**

**Third quarter**

- GB – Jordy Nelson 15-yard pass from Aaron Rodgers (Mason Crosby kick), 8:20. Packers 31–0. **Drive: 4 plays, 60 yards, 1:53.**
- WAS – Pierre Garçon 6-yard pass from Robert Griffin III (John Potter kick), 4:18. Packers 31–7. **Drive: 8 plays, 83 yards, 4:01.**
- GB – James Starks 32-yard run (Mason Crosby kick), 2:48. Packers 38–7. **Drive: 4 plays, 80 yards, 1:34.**

**Fourth quarter**

- WAS – Jordan Reed 3-yard pass from Robert Griffin III (John Potter kick), 11:08. Packers 38–14. **Drive: 12 plays, 80 yards, 6:39.**
- WAS – Santana Moss 9-yard pass from Robert Griffin III (pass failed), 7:40. Packers 38–20. **Drive: 6 plays, 45 yards, 1:38.**

**Top passers**

- WAS – Robert Griffin III – 26/40, 320 yards, 3 TD, INT
- GB – Aaron Rodgers – 34/42, 480 yards, 4 TD

**Top rushers**

- WAS – Alfred Morris – 13 rushes, 107 yards
- GB – James Starks – 20 rushes, 132 yards, TD

**Top receivers**

- WAS – Pierre Garçon – 8 receptions, 143 yards, TD
- GB – James Jones – 11 receptions, 178 yards

Coming off their season-opening loss to Philadelphia, Washington traveled to historic Lambeau Field to take on the Aaron Rodgers-led Green Bay Packers in a battle of defending division champions and also the first meeting between these two teams since Week 5 of 2010. This meeting marked the 30th anniversary of their meeting on October 17, 1983, in which Green Bay beat Washington 48–47 in the highest-scoring Monday Night Football game in history (although October 17 fell on a Thursday in 2013, the NFL ultimately did not schedule the teams to meet that night).

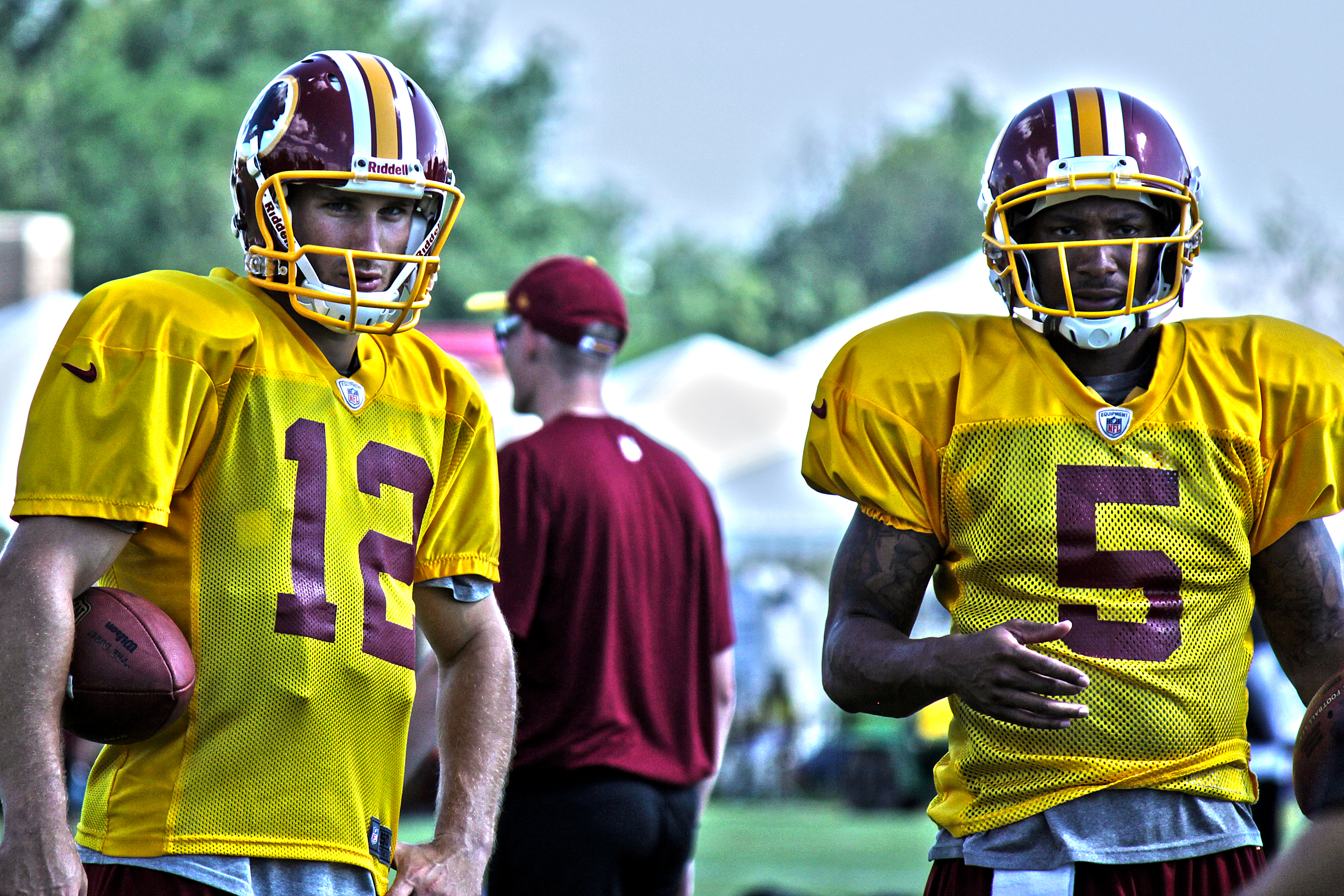
Kirk Cousins and Pat White at training camp, July 2013

Green Bay got possession first, and Washington's defense was able to stiffen once Green Bay got deep into their territory, and the Packers settled for a Mason Crosby 28-yard field goal. After a Washington three-and-out, Green Bay drove into field goal range, but on 4th-and-3, instead of punting or kicking a long field goal, Rodgers found wide receiver Randall Cobb for a 35-yard touchdown to extend the Green Bay advantage to 10–0.

Washington's struggles would continue, both offensively and defensively, in the second. Rodgers connected with Jordy Nelson for a 15-yard score to make Green Bay's advantage 17–0. Green Bay would score yet again, this time by Rodgers finding Jermichael Finley for a 3-yard score to make it 24–0. Washington finally got a drive going offensively, but after opting to not test new placekicker John Potter, who was filling in for an injured Kai Forbath, Washington could not convert a fourth down, and Green Bay began driving yet again. Washington got a reprieve, however, when Randall Cobb, extending for the pylon to try to make it 31–0 right before halftime, lost control of the ball, fumbled at the pylon, awarding the ball to Washington by way of a touchback, finishing the first half scoring at 24–0 Green Bay.

Washington got the ball to start the third, and got into field goal range again. This time, they tested Potter from 50 yards, and he was well wide of the mark, and Green Bay took possession again. Green Bay would continue to take it to Washington, as Rodgers connected with Nelson once more, to make it 31–0 Green Bay. Washington got the ball back and was finally able to respond, with quarterback Robert Griffin III connecting with Pierre Garçon for a 6-yard score to cut the deficit to 31–7. Any hopes of a comeback were stumped out, however, when Packers running back James Starks raced past defenders into the end zone for a 32-yard score to put the advantage up to 38–7.

In the fourth, Washington tried to rally and was once again able to sustain its offense, once again, when the game was either out of reach or close to it. Griffin found rookie tight end Jordan Reed for a 3-yard score. After a Green Bay punt, Washington scored again, this time by way of Griffin floating a pass to the corner of the end zone for veteran wide receiver Santana Moss to cut the deficit to 38–20. Needing a two-point conversion to cut the deficit to two scores, Washington failed in this endeavor, and kicked the ball back to Green Bay. After two stops on first and second down, Rodgers went back to the air on 3rd-and-9, and connected with James Jones, and Washington never saw the ball again. Green Bay ran out the clock and preserved the 38–20 win.

With the loss, Washington fell to 0–2 for the first time since 2006, and remained in the NFC East Cellar. Washington also allowed Green Bay to have a 100-yard rusher. The last time Green Bay had a 100-yard rusher was in Week 5 of the 2010 season, also against Washington, when Brandon Jackson racked up over 100 yards on the Redskins, although Washington won that game. Green Bay set a franchise record, as Aaron Rodgers' 480 passing yards tied Matt Flynn for the most in a game, and James Starks' 100-yard rushing performance snapped a 44-game streak of games without a 100-yard rusher for Green Bay. This was also the first time in Packers history that they had a 400-yard passer and 100-yard rusher in the same game.

==== Week 3: vs. Detroit Lions ====
Week 3: Detroit Lions at Washington Redskins – Game summary

Quarter	1	2	3	4	Total
**Lions**	7	10	0	10	**27**
Redskins	7	7	3	3	**20**

at FedExField, Landover, Maryland

- Date: September 22
- Game time: 1:00 pm. EDT
- Game weather: 72 °F (22 °C), sunny
- Game attendance: 80,111
- Referee: Ed Hochuli
- TV announcers (Fox): Dick Stockton, Ronde Barber and Kris Budden
- Recap, Game book

Game information

**First quarter**

- WAS – DeAngelo Hall 17-yard interception return (John Potter kick), 9:31. Redskins 7–0.
- DET – Joique Bell 12-yard run (David Akers kick), 5:20. Tied 7–7. **Drive: 8 plays, 85 yards, 4:09.**

**Second quarter**

- DET – Joseph Fauria 5-yard pass from Matthew Stafford (David Akers kick), 14:53. Lions 14–7. **Drive: 10 plays, 92 yards, 3:52.**
- WAS – Alfred Morris 30-yard run (John Potter kick), 3:38. Tied 14–14. **Drive: 7 plays, 72 yards, 3:24.**
- DET – David Akers 32-yard field goal, 0:49. Lions 17–14. **Drive: 9 plays, 66 yards, 2:45.**

**Third quarter**

- WAS – John Potter 43-yard field goal, 12:16. Tied 17–17. **Drive: 6 plays, 35 yards, 2:49.**

**Fourth quarter**

- DET – David Akers 28-yard field goal, 11:13. Lions 20–17. **Drive: 6 plays, 65 yards, 1:30.**
- DET – Calvin Johnson 11-yard pass from Matthew Stafford (David Akers kick), 4:02. Lions 27–17. **Drive: 9 plays, 71 yards, 4:19.**
- WAS – John Potter 21-yard field goal, 1:44. Lions 27–20. **Drive: 13 plays, 72 yards, 2:16.**

**Top passers**

- DET – Matthew Stafford – 25/42, 385 yards, 2 TD, INT
- WAS – Robert Griffin III – 32/50, 326 yards, INT

**Top rushers**

- DET – Joique Bell – 20 rushes, 63 yards, TD
- WAS – Alfred Morris – 15 rushes, 73 yards, TD

**Top receivers**

- DET – Nate Burleson – 6 receptions, 116 yards
- WAS – Santana Moss – 7 receptions, 77 yards

Coming off their road loss to Green Bay, Washington returned home for a duel at FedExField with the Detroit Lions, matching up with them for the first time since 2010, but the first time in DC since 2007.

After teams exchanged punts in the first, Washington struck first when Lions quarterback Matthew Stafford was intercepted by Redskins cornerback DeAngelo Hall who returned the interception 9 yards for a 7–0 Washington lead. Detroit responded right away, however, as running back Joique Bell broke numerous tackles on his way to a 12-yard touchdown, evening the score at 7–7. The first quarter would conclude without any further scoring.

Early in the second, Detroit finished off a drive with Stafford finding tight end Joseph Fauria for a 5-yard score to give Detroit the 14–7 lead. Later in the second, after a few missed opportunities by both teams, Redskins running back Alfred Morris took off for a 30-yard score, evening the score at 14–14 late in the second. Washington's much-maligned defense, however, could not hold it and Detroit retook the lead before halftime thanks to a David Akers 32-yard field goal, giving Detroit a 17–14 edge and halfway to its first win ever in Washington.

Early in the third, Washington was able to equalize with John Potter making his first career field goal from 43 yards out. Both teams failed to score again, and the teams went into the final quarter tied at 17.

Early in the fourth, Detroit took the lead again, this time by way of Akers hitting a 28-yard field goal, giving Detroit a 20–17 lead. On Washington's ensuing possession, it appeared as if Washington took the lead, as Robert Griffin III found wide receiver Aldrick Robinson for a 57-yard score and an apparent 24–20 lead. However, upon video replay, it showed Robinson was bobbling the ball as he fell to the ground, thus the apparent pass was ruled incomplete, and Washington could not score again, punting. Detroit marched down the field and all but sealed the deal, as Stafford connected with superstar Calvin Johnson with just under four minutes remaining in the game. Washington didn't give up, however, and John Potter connected from 21 yards out to cut the lead to 27–20. However, after not recovering the onside kick, Washington needed to stop Detroit. They did this, and got the ball back with just under 50 seconds remaining. Washington got to midfield, but Griffin's hail mary pass was off the mark, and Washington lost once again.

With the loss. Washington fell to 0–3 for the first time since 2001, and also lost to the Detroit Lions for the third straight time, having not beaten them since 2008 when they didn't even manage to win a single game. However, Washington lost to Detroit at home for the first time since 1935, when they were still the Boston Redskins. They had never, prior to this day, lost to Detroit in Washington or Landover.

==== Week 4: at Oakland Raiders ====
Week 4: Washington Redskins at Oakland Raiders – Game summary

Quarter	1	2	3	4	Total
**Redskins**	0	10	7	7	**24**
Raiders	14	0	0	0	**14**

at O.co Coliseum, Oakland, California

- Date: September 29
- Game time: 4:25 pm. EDT/1:25 p.m. PDT
- Game weather: 77 °F (25 °C), sunny
- Game attendance: 53,549
- Referee: Bill Leavy
- TV announcers (Fox): Dick Stockton, Ronde Barber and Kris Budden
- Recap, Game book

Game information

**First quarter**

- OAK – Jeremy Stewart blocked punt recovery in end zone (Sebastian Janikowski kick), 10:40. Raiders 7–0.
- OAK – Mychal Rivera 18-yard pass from Matt Flynn (Sebastian Janikowski kick), 3:06. Raiders 14–0. **Drive: 10 plays, 81 yards, 5:21.**

**Second quarter**

- WAS – John Potter 25-yard field goal, 14:21. Raiders 14–3. **Drive: 11 plays, 73 yards, 3:45.**
- WAS – David Amerson 45-yard interception return (John Potter kick), 10:59. Raiders 14–10.

**Third quarter**

- WAS – Pierre Garçon 5-yard pass from Robert Griffin III (John Potter kick), 2:58. Redskins 17–14. **Drive: 8 plays, 58 yards, 3:53.**

**Fourth quarter**

- WAS – Roy Helu 14-yard run (John Potter kick), 6:59. Redskins 24–14. **Drive: 2 plays, 42 yards, 0:55.**

**Top passers**

- WAS – Robert Griffin III – 18/31, 227 yards, TD
- OAK – Matt Flynn – 21/32, 227 yards, TD, INT

**Top rushers**

- WAS – Alfred Morris – 16 rushes, 71 yards
- OAK – Rashad Jennings – 14 rushes, 45 yards

**Top receivers**

- WAS – Pierre Garçon – 6 receptions, 59 yards, TD
- OAK – Rashad Jennings – 8 receptions, 71 yards

Coming off their third straight loss, Washington traveled to Oakland to play the Oakland Raiders for the first time since 2009.

Washington got the ball to start the game, and punted. Oakland then followed with a punt, too. Washington went three-and-out yet again, but this time, Saverio Rocca's punt was blocked by Raiders running back Rashad Jennings and recovered by fellow Raiders running back Jeremy Stewart in the end zone for a Raiders touchdown and a 7–0 lead. Washington could not respond, and when Oakland got the ball again, quarterback Matt Flynn, filling in for concussed quarterback Terrelle Pryor found rookie tight end Mychal Rivera (brother of Glee star Naya Rivera) for a 31-yard score and a 14–0 Raiders lead.

Needing a spark, Washington switched to a hurry-up offense for their next drive, and sustained one for the first time on the day. It stalled when it reached the red zone, however, and Washington placekicker John Potter hit a 25-yard chip shot to cut the deficit to 14–3. Later in the quarter, Matt Flynn threw a pass that was intercepted by cornerback David Amerson and returned 45 yards for a score and the deficit was 14–10. The teams were not able to do much else, and the halves concluded with this score at 14–10.

In the third, both offenses continued to struggle, but late in the third, Washington quarterback Robert Griffin III found wide receiver Pierre Garçon for a 5-yard score, and Washington's first lead in the second half of a game all season.

In the fourth, Oakland's offense continued to sputter, even fumbling for a second time at midfield. Washington was able to sustain a running game in spite of an injury to star running back Alfred Morris, with typical third-down back Roy Helu, Jr. running into the end zone from 14 yards out to increase Washington's lead to 24–14. Oakland could not rally, and Washington held on for its first win.

With the win, Washington improved to 1–3 and heads into the bye week, reconvening on NBC Sunday Night Football for a clash with Dallas in two weeks. This was Washington's third consecutive win against an AFC opponent.

==== Week 6: at Dallas Cowboys ====
Week 6: Washington Redskins at Dallas Cowboys – Game summary

Quarter	1	2	3	4	Total
Redskins	3	3	10	0	**16**
**Cowboys**	7	7	7	10	**31**

at AT&T Stadium, Arlington, Texas

- Date: October 13
- Game time: 8:30 pm. EDT/7:30 pm. CDT
- Game weather: Played indoors (retractable roof closed)
- Game attendance: 90,239
- Referee: Walt Anderson
- TV announcers (NBC): Al Michaels, Cris Collinsworth and Michele Tafoya
- Recap, Game book

Game information

**First quarter**

- DAL – DeMarco Murray 4-yard run (Dan Bailey kick), 8:57. Cowboys 7–0. **Drive: 10 plays, 80 yards, 6:08.**
- WAS – Kai Forbath 20-yard field goal, 1:42. Cowboys 7–3. **Drive: 13 plays, 78 yards, 7:14.**

**Second quarter**

- DAL – Dwayne Harris 86-yard punt return (Dan Bailey kick), 2:26. Cowboys 14–3.
- WAS – Kai Forbath 32-yard field goal, 0:01. Cowboys 14–6. **Drive: 11 plays, 68 yards, 2:26.**

**Third quarter**

- WAS – Kai Forbath 33-yard field goal, 10:08. Cowboys 14–9. **Drive: 10 plays, 65 yards, 4:57.**
- DAL – Terrance Williams 15-yard pass from Tony Romo (Dan Bailey kick), 9:12. Cowboys 21–9. **Drive: 2 plays, 15 yards, 1:00.**
- WAS – Alfred Morris 45-yard run (Kai Forbath kick), 3:53. Cowboys 21–16. **Drive: 3 plays, 71 yards, 0:37.**

**Fourth quarter**

- DAL – Dan Bailey 30-yard field goal, 10:40. Cowboys 24–16. **Drive: 9 plays, 49 yards, 4:06.**
- DAL – Joseph Randle 1-yard run (Dan Bailey kick), 8:56. Cowboys 31–16. **Drive: 2 plays, 3 yards, 0:47.**

**Top passers**

- WAS – Robert Griffin III – 19/39, 246 yards, INT
- DAL – Tony Romo – 18/30, 170 yards, TD, INT

**Top rushers**

- WAS – Alfred Morris – 16 rushes, 81 yards, TD
- DAL – DeMarco Murray – 7 rushes, 29 yards, TD

**Top receivers**

- WAS – Pierre Garçon – 6 receptions, 69 yards
- DAL – Cole Beasley – 4 receptions, 44 yards

==== Week 7: vs. Chicago Bears ====
Week 7: Chicago Bears at Washington Redskins – Game summary

Quarter	1	2	3	4	Total
Bears	10	7	7	17	**41**
**Redskins**	3	21	7	14	**45**

at FedExField, Landover, Maryland

- Date: October 20
- Game time: 1:00 pm. EDT
- Game weather: 61 °F (16 °C), sunny
- Game attendance: 83,147
- Referee: Clete Blakeman
- TV announcers (Fox): Kenny Albert, Daryl Johnston and Tony Siragusa
- Recap, Game book

Game information

**First quarter**

- WAS – Kai Forbath 38-yard field goal, 11:33. Redskins 3–0. **Drive: 7 plays, 60 yards, 3:32.**
- CHI – Robbie Gould 47-yard field goal, 7:08. Tied 3–3. **Drive: 5 plays, 18 yards, 1:27.**
- CHI – Matt Forte 2-yard run (Robbie Gould kick), 6:07. Bears 10–3. **Drive: 2 plays, 10 yards, 0:49.**

**Second quarter**

- WAS – Roy Helu 14-yard run (Kai Forbath kick), 13:50. Tied 10–10. **Drive: 13 plays, 80 yards, 7:18.**
- WAS – Brian Orakpo 29-yard interception return (Kai Forbath kick), 13:27. Redskins 17–10.
- CHI – Devin Hester 81-yard punt return (Robbie Gould kick), 5:52. Tied 17–17.
- WAS – Jordan Reed 3-yard pass from Robert Griffin III (Kai Forbath kick), 0:33. Redskins 24–17. **Drive: 11 plays, 74 yards, 5:25.**

**Third quarter**

- CHI – Matt Forte 50-yard run (Robbie Gould kick), 6:43. Tied 24–24. **Drive: 3 plays, 80 yards, 1:32.**
- WAS – Roy Helu 3-yard run (Kai Forbath kick), 3:26. Redskins 31–24. **Drive: 8 plays, 83 yards, 3:15.**

**Fourth quarter**

- CHI – Matt Forte 6-yard run (Robbie Gould kick), 12:49. Tied 31–31. **Drive: 9 plays, 89 yards, 5:35.**
- WAS – Aldrick Robinson 45-yard pass from Robert Griffin III (Kai Forbath kick), 11:04. Redskins 38–31. **Drive: 5 plays, 80 yards, 1:49.**
- CHI – Robbie Gould 49-yard field goal, 8:44. Redskins 38–34. **Drive: 6 plays, 34 yards, 2:16.**
- CHI – Martellus Bennett 7-yard pass from Josh McCown (Robbie Gould kick), 4:02. Bears 41–38. **Drive: 4 plays, 67 yards, 2:30.**
- WAS – Roy Helu 3-yard run (Kai Forbath kick), 0:49. Redskins 45–41. **Drive: 12 plays, 80 yards, 3:12.**

**Top passers**

- CHI – Josh McCown – 14/20, 204 yards, TD
- WAS – Robert Griffin III – 18/29, 298 yards, 2 TD, INT

**Top rushers**

- CHI – Matt Forte – 16 rushes, 91 yards, 3 TD
- WAS – Alfred Morris – 19 rushes, 95 yards

**Top receivers**

- CHI – Alshon Jeffery – 4 receptions, 105 yards
- WAS – Jordan Reed – 9 receptions, 134 yards, TD

==== Week 8: at Denver Broncos ====
Week 8: Washington Redskins at Denver Broncos – Game summary

Quarter	1	2	3	4	Total
Redskins	0	7	14	0	**21**
**Broncos**	7	0	7	31	**45**

at Sports Authority Field at Mile High, Denver, Colorado

- Date: October 27
- Game time: 4:25 pm. EDT/2:25 p.m. MDT
- Game weather: 69 °F (21 °C), mostly sunny
- Game attendance: 77,031
- Referee: Ron Winter
- TV announcers (Fox): Thom Brennaman, Troy Aikman and Pam Oliver
- Recap, Game book

Game information

**First quarter**

- DEN – Wes Welker 6-yard pass from Peyton Manning (Matt Prater kick), 10:02. Broncos 7–0. **Drive: 9 plays, 77 yards, 3:40.**

**Second quarter**

- WAS – Leonard Hankerson 7-yard pass from Robert Griffin III (Kai Forbath kick), 0:19. Tied 7–7. **Drive: 16 plays, 95 yards, 7:03.**

**Third quarter**

- WAS – Alfred Morris 1-yard run (Kai Forbath kick), 11:34. Redskins 14–7. **Drive: 3 plays, 19 yards, 1:22.**
- WAS – DeAngelo Hall 26-yard interception return (Kai Forbath kick), 11:25. Redskins 21–7.
- DEN – Montee Ball 4-yard run (Matt Prater kick), 7:48. Redskins 21–14. **Drive: 11 plays, 75 yards, 3:37.**

**Fourth quarter**

- DEN – Joel Dreessen 1-yard pass from Peyton Manning (Matt Prater kick), 14:56. Tied 21–21. **Drive: 16 plays, 83 yards, 4:59.**
- DEN – Knowshon Moreno 35-yard pass from Peyton Manning (Matt Prater kick), 14:19. Broncos 28–21. **Drive: 1 play, 35 yards, 0:10.**
- DEN – Matt Prater 19-yard field goal, 11:14. Broncos 31–21. **Drive: 5 plays, 23 yards, 2:01.**
- DEN – Demaryius Thomas 35-yard pass from Peyton Manning (Matt Prater kick), 6:35. Broncos 38–21. **Drive: 2 plays, 25 yards, 0:34.**
- DEN – Dominique Rodgers-Cromartie 75-yard interception return (Matt Prater kick), 2:07. Broncos 45–21.

**Top passers**

- WAS – Robert Griffin III – 15/30, 132 yards, TD, 2 INT
- DEN – Peyton Manning – 30/44, 354 yards, 4 TD, 3 INT

**Top rushers**

- WAS – Alfred Morris – 17 rushes, 93 yards, TD
- DEN – Knowshon Moreno – 14 rushes, 44 yards

**Top receivers**

- WAS – Jordan Reed – 8 receptions, 90 yards
- DEN – Knowshon Moreno – 6 receptions, 89 yards, TD

This was head coach Mike Shanahan's first return to Denver in 5 years since his dismissal from the organization following the 2008 season. Shanahan previously served as the Broncos head coach from 1995 to 2008, led the team to back-to-back Super Bowl titles in 1998 and 1999, and is the franchise's winningest head coach with a total of 146 games won. In a sloppy game that saw 9 combined turnovers, Washington would lead 21–7 at one point, but the Broncos would score 38 straight points to win 45–21. The Redskins were outscored 31–0 in the 4th quarter.

==== Week 9: vs. San Diego Chargers ====
Week 9: San Diego Chargers at Washington Redskins – Game summary

Quarter	1	2	3	4	OT	Total
Chargers	0	14	0	10	0	**24**
**Redskins**	0	7	7	10	6	**30**

at FedExField, Landover, Maryland

- Date: November 3
- Game time: 1:00 pm. EST
- Game weather: 57 °F (14 °C), sunny
- Game attendance: 80,115
- Referee: Jerome Boger
- TV announcers (CBS): Ian Eagle and Dan Fouts
- Recap, Game book

Game information

**First quarter**

- No scoring plays.

**Second quarter**

- SD – Sean Lissemore interception in WAS end zone (Nick Novak kick), 11:43. Chargers 7–0.
- WAS – Alfred Morris 5-yard run (Kai Forbath kick), 5:30. Tied 7–7. **Drive: 4 plays, 67 yards, 1:55.**
- SD – Eddie Royal 15-yard pass from Philip Rivers (Nick Novak kick), 0:49. Chargers 14–7. **Drive: 11 plays, 85 yards, 4:43.**

**Third quarter**

- WAS – Darrel Young 1-yard run (Kai Forbath kick), 9:46. Tied 14–14. **Drive: 9 plays, 74 yards, 5:17.**

**Fourth quarter**

- WAS – Darrel Young 1-yard run (Kai Forbath kick), 14:20. Redskins 21–14. **Drive: 11 plays, 79 yards, 7:45.**
- WAS – Kai Forbath 47-yard field goal, 7:06. Redskins 24–14. **Drive: 7 plays, 22 yards, 3:26.**
- SD – Keenan Allen 16-yard pass from Philip Rivers (Nick Novak kick), 4:16. Redskins 24–21. **Drive: 8 plays, 77 yards, 2:49.**
- SD – Nick Novak 19-yard field goal, 0:07. Tied 24–24. **Drive: 14 plays, 91 yards, 2:07.**

**Overtime**

- WAS – Darrel Young 4-yard run, 9:05. Redskins 30–24. **Drive: 10 plays, 78 yards, 6:01.**

**Top passers**

- SD – Philip Rivers – 29/46, 341 yards, 2 TD, 2 INT
- WAS – Robert Griffin III – 23/32, 291 yards, INT

**Top rushers**

- SD – Ryan Mathews – 7 rushes, 34 yards
- WAS – Alfred Morris – 25 rushes, 121 yards, TD

**Top receivers**

- SD – Keenan Allen – 8 receptions, 128 yards, TD
- WAS – Pierre Garçon – 7 receptions, 172 yards

==== Week 10: at Minnesota Vikings ====
Week 10: Washington Redskins at Minnesota Vikings – Game summary

Quarter	1	2	3	4	Total
Redskins	10	14	3	0	**27**
**Vikings**	7	7	14	6	**34**

at Mall of America Field at the Hubert H. Humphrey Metrodome, Minneapolis, Minnesota

- Date: November 7
- Game time: 8:25 pm. EST/7:25 pm. CST
- Game weather: Played indoors (dome stadium)
- Game attendance: 64,011
- Referee: Ed Hochuli
- TV announcers (NFLN): Brad Nessler, Mike Mayock and Alex Flanagan
- Recap, Game book

Game information

**First quarter**

- WAS – Kai Forbath 20-yard field goal, 8:21. Redskins 3–0. **Drive: 11 plays, 50 yards, 4:53.**
- MIN – Adrian Peterson 18-yard run (Blair Walsh kick), 5:17. Vikings 7–3. **Drive: 6 plays, 65 yards, 3:06.**
- WAS – Pierre Garçon 8-yard pass from Robert Griffin III (Kai Forbath kick), 1:22. Redskins 10–7. **Drive: 7 plays, 78 yards, 3:53.**

**Second quarter**

- MIN – Cordarrelle Patterson 2-yard pass from Christian Ponder (Blair Walsh kick), 13:04. Vikings 14–10. **Drive: 8 plays, 73 yards, 3:18.**
- WAS – Jordan Reed 11-yard pass from Robert Griffin III (Kai Forbath kick), 5:08. Redskins 17–14. **Drive: 13 plays, 80 yards, 7:57.**
- WAS – Logan Paulsen 1-yard pass from Robert Griffin III (Kai Forbath kick), 0:15. Redskins 24–14. **Drive: 11 plays, 77 yards, 3:57.**

**Third quarter**

- WAS – Kai Forbath 40-yard field goal, 9:27. Redskins 27–14. **Drive: 12 plays, 59 yards, 5:38.**
- MIN – John Carlson 28-yard pass from Christian Ponder (Blair Walsh kick), 4:43. Redskins 27–21. **Drive: 9 plays, 74 yards, 4:50.**
- MIN – Adrian Peterson 1-yard run (Blair Walsh kick), 1:12. Vikings 28–27. **Drive: 5 plays, 41 yards, 2:00.**

**Fourth quarter**

- MIN – Blair Walsh 39-yard field goal, 9:57. Vikings 31–27. **Drive: 7 plays, 30 yards, 2:38.**
- MIN – Blair Walsh 40-yard field goal, 3:40. Vikings 34–27. **Drive: 10 plays, 40 yards, 4:47.**

**Top passers**

- WAS – Robert Griffin III – 24/37, 281 yards, 3 TD
- MIN – Christian Ponder – 17/21, 174 yards, 2 TD, INT

**Top rushers**

- WAS – Alfred Morris – 26 rushes, 139 yards
- MIN – Adrian Peterson – 20 rushes, 75 yards, 2 TD

**Top receivers**

- WAS – Pierre Garçon – 7 receptions, 119 yards, TD
- MIN – John Carlson – 7 receptions, 98 yards, TD

==== Week 11: at Philadelphia Eagles ====
Week 11: Washington Redskins at Philadelphia Eagles – Game summary

Quarter	1	2	3	4	Total
Redskins	0	0	0	16	**16**
**Eagles**	7	10	7	0	**24**

at Lincoln Financial Field, Philadelphia, Pennsylvania

- Date: November 17
- Game time: 1:00 pm. EST
- Game weather: 64 °F (18 °C), partly sunny
- Game attendance: 69,144
- Referee: Walt Coleman
- TV announcers (Fox): Kevin Burkhardt, John Lynch and Erin Andrews
- Recap, Game book

Game information

**First quarter**

- PHI – Nick Foles 4-yard run (Alex Henery kick), 2:53. Eagles 7–0. **Drive: 4 plays, 68 yards, 1:16.**

**Second quarter**

- PHI – LeSean McCoy 1-yard run (Alex Henery kick), 14:34. Eagles 14–0. **Drive: 6 plays, 69 yards, 1:48.**
- PHI – Alex Henery 24-yard field goal, 3:55. Eagles 17–0. **Drive: 8 plays, 83 yards, 3:53.**

**Third quarter**

- PHI – LeSean McCoy 1-yard run (Alex Henery kick), 9:43. Eagles 24–0. **Drive: 13 plays, 80 yards, 5:19.**

**Fourth quarter**

- WAS – Darrel Young 62-yard pass from Robert Griffin III (Robert Griffin III - Nick Williams pass), 13:08. Eagles 24–8. **Drive: 1 play, 62 yards, 0:12.**
- WAS – Aldrick Robinson 41-yard pass from Robert Griffin III (Robert Griffin III run), 6:04. Eagles 24–16. **Drive: 7 plays, 85 yards, 2:40.**

**Top passers**

- WAS – Robert Griffin III – 17/35, 264 yards, 2 TD, INT
- PHI – Nick Foles – 17/26, 298 yards

**Top rushers**

- WAS – Alfred Morris – 22 rushes, 93 yards
- PHI – LeSean McCoy – 20 rushes, 77 yards, 2 TD

**Top receivers**

- WAS – Pierre Garçon – 6 receptions, 68 yards
- PHI – DeSean Jackson – 4 receptions, 82 yards

==== Week 12: vs. San Francisco 49ers ====
Week 12: San Francisco 49ers at Washington Redskins – Game summary

Quarter	1	2	3	4	Total
**49ers**	7	3	14	3	**27**
Redskins	0	6	0	0	**6**

at FedExField, Landover, Maryland

- Date: November 25
- Game time: 8:40 pm. EST
- Game weather: 37 °F (3 °C), clear
- Game attendance: 79,773
- Referee: John Parry
- TV announcers (ESPN): Mike Tirico, Jon Gruden and Lisa Salters
- Recap, Game book

Game information

**First quarter**

- SF – Anquan Boldin 19-yard pass from Colin Kaepernick (Phil Dawson kick), 3:02. 49ers 7–0. **Drive: 7 plays, 62 yards, 3:19.**

**Second quarter**

- SF – Phil Dawson 29-yard field goal, 12:14. 49ers 10–0. **Drive: 5 plays, 47 yards, 2:51.**
- WAS – Kai Forbath 36-yard field goal, 6:48. 49ers 10–3. **Drive: 13 plays, 63 yards, 5:26.**
- WAS – Kai Forbath 35-yard field goal, 0:04. 49ers 10–6. **Drive: 11 plays, 62 yards, 4:55.**

**Third quarter**

- SF – Anquan Boldin 6-yard pass from Colin Kaepernick (Phil Dawson kick), 9:33. 49ers 17–6. **Drive: 6 plays, 60 yards, 2:41.**
- SF – Vernon Davis 1-yard pass from Colin Kaepernick (Phil Dawson kick), 1:09. 49ers 24–6. **Drive: 5 plays, 39 yards, 2:30.**

**Fourth quarter**

- SF – Phil Dawson 49-yard field goal, 9:08. 49ers 27–6. **Drive: 11 plays, 24 yards, 5:47.**

**Top passers**

- SF – Colin Kaepernick – 15/24, 235 yards, 3 TD
- WAS – Robert Griffin III – 16/26, 118 yards, INT

**Top rushers**

- SF – Frank Gore – 13 rushes, 31 yards
- WAS – Alfred Morris – 14 rushes, 52 yards

**Top receivers**

- SF – Anquan Boldin – 5 receptions, 94 yards, 2 TD
- WAS – Pierre Garçon – 8 receptions, 48 yards

==== Week 13: vs. New York Giants ====
Week 13: New York Giants at Washington Redskins – Game summary

Quarter	1	2	3	4	Total
**Giants**	0	14	0	10	**24**
Redskins	7	7	3	0	**17**

at FedExField, Landover, Maryland

- Date: December 1
- Game time: 8:30 pm. EST
- Game weather: 43 °F (6 °C), cloudy
- Game attendance: 75,220
- Referee: Jeff Triplette
- TV announcers (NBC): Al Michaels, Cris Collinsworth and Michele Tafoya
- Recap, Game book

With the loss on a questionable call by the officials, the Redskins were officially eliminated from playoff contention.

==== Week 14: vs. Kansas City Chiefs ====
Week 14: Kansas City Chiefs at Washington Redskins – Game summary

Quarter	1	2	3	4	Total
**Chiefs**	17	21	0	7	**45**
Redskins	0	10	0	0	**10**

at FedExField, Landover, Maryland

- Date: December 8
- Game time: 1:00 pm. EST
- Game weather: 30 °F (−1 °C), snow
- Game attendance: 56,247
- Referee: Carl Cheffers
- TV announcers (CBS): Kevin Harlan and Solomon Wilcots
- Recap, Game book

Washington got into a hole in which they could not climb out of, as they trailed as big as 38-0 and scored all their points in the second quarter.

==== Week 15: at Atlanta Falcons ====
Week 15: Washington Redskins at Atlanta Falcons – Game summary

Quarter	1	2	3	4	Total
Redskins	7	13	0	6	**26**
**Falcons**	14	3	7	3	**27**

at Georgia Dome, Atlanta, Georgia

- Date: December 15
- Game time: 1:00 pm. EST
- Game weather: Played indoors (dome stadium)
- Game attendance: 70,069
- Referee: Gene Steratore
- TV announcers (Fox): Sam Rosen, Heath Evans and Molly McGrath
- Recap, Game book

Leading up to the game, the Redskins were criticized by many after Mike Shanahan decided to bench Robert Griffin III for Kirk Cousins for their game against the Falcons. Shanahan said that he decided to bench Griffin because he did not want him to be hurt again in a lost season. Trailing 27–20 in the 4th quarter late, Cousins led them down the field to score a touchdown, but the Redskins decided to go for 2 for the win instead of the tie. The 2-point attempt failed and the Falcons won 27–26. Griffin was benched for the rest of the season.

==== Week 16: vs. Dallas Cowboys ====
Week 16: Dallas Cowboys at Washington Redskins – Game summary

Quarter	1	2	3	4	Total
**Cowboys**	7	7	0	10	**24**
Redskins	3	3	14	3	**23**

at FedExField, Landover, Maryland

- Date: December 22
- Game time: 1:00 pm. EST
- Game weather: 65 °F (18 °C), rain
- Game attendance: 80,411
- Referee: Bill Leavy
- TV announcers (Fox): Kevin Burkhardt, John Lynch and Erin Andrews
- Recap, Game book

Trying to play spoiler, the Redskins hosted the Dallas Cowboys and attempted to spoil their playoff chances. Leading 23–17 late, the Redskins looked poised to pull out the upset, but the Cowboys would score with just under a minute left and won 24–23.

==== Week 17: at New York Giants ====
Week 17: Washington Redskins at New York Giants – Game summary

Quarter	1	2	3	4	Total
Redskins	0	6	0	0	**6**
**Giants**	0	10	7	3	**20**

at MetLife Stadium, East Rutherford, New Jersey

- Date: December 29
- Game time: 1:00 pm. EST
- Game weather: 40 °F (4 °C), rain
- Game attendance: 80,177
- Referee: Bill Vinovich
- TV announcers (Fox): Dick Stockton, Ronde Barber and Kris Budden
- Recap, Game book

With the loss, the Redskins finished in last place in the NFC and were swept by the Giants for the first time since 2010. They would also be the only team this season to be swept by all of its division rivals.

== Standings ==
=== Division ===
NFC East
	W	L	T	PCT	DIV	CONF	PF	PA	STK
^{(3)} Philadelphia Eagles	10	6	0	.625	4–2	9–3	442	382	W2
Dallas Cowboys	8	8	0	.500	5–1	7–5	439	432	L1
New York Giants	7	9	0	.438	3–3	6–6	294	383	W2
Washington Redskins	3	13	0	.188	0–6	1–11	334	478	L8

=== Conference ===
NFC
#	Team	Division	W	L	T	PCT	DIV	CONF	SOS	SOV	STK
Division winners
1	Seattle Seahawks	West	13	3	0	.813	4–2	10–2	.490	.445	W1
2	Carolina Panthers	South	12	4	0	.750	5–1	9–3	.494	.451	W3
3	Philadelphia Eagles	East	10	6	0	.625	4–2	9–3	.453	.391	W2
4	Green Bay Packers	North	8	7	1	.531	3–2–1	6–5–1	.453	.371	W1
Wild cards
5	San Francisco 49ers	West	12	4	0	.750	5–1	9–3	.494	.414	W6
6	New Orleans Saints	South	11	5	0	.688	5–1	9–3	.516	.455	W1
Did not qualify for the postseason
7	Arizona Cardinals	West	10	6	0	.625	2–4	6–6	.531	.444	L1
8 (Note: Chicago defeated Dallas head-to-head (Week 14, 45–28).)	Chicago Bears	North	8	8	0	.500	2–4	4–8	.465	.469	L2
9	Dallas Cowboys	East	8	8	0	.500	5–1	7–5	.484	.363	L1
10 (Note: The NY Giants and Detroit finished with a better conference record than St. Louis.) (Note: The NY Giants defeated Detroit head-to-head (Week 16, 23–20 (OT)).)	New York Giants	East	7	9	0	.438	3–3	6–6	.520	.366	W2
11 (Note: Detroit finished with a better conference record than St. Louis.)	Detroit Lions	North	7	9	0	.438	4–2	6–6	.457	.402	L4
12	St. Louis Rams	West	7	9	0	.438	1–5	4–8	.551	.446	L1
13	Minnesota Vikings	North	5	10	1	.344	2–3–1	4–7–1	.512	.450	W1
14 (Note: Atlanta finished with a better conference record than Tampa Bay.)	Atlanta Falcons	South	4	12	0	.250	1–5	3–9	.553	.313	L2
15	Tampa Bay Buccaneers	South	4	12	0	.250	1–5	2–10	.574	.391	L3
16	Washington Redskins	East	3	13	0	.188	0–6	1–11	.516	.438	L8
Tiebreakers (Note: When breaking ties for three or more teams under the NFL's rules, they are first broken within divisions, then comparing only the highest-ranked remaining team from each division.)

== Honors ==
Four Redskins were selected to be on the NFL Network's list of the Top 100 Players of 2013. Robert Griffin III is ranked at #15, Alfred Morris at #64, London Fletcher at #86, and Trent Williams at #99.

Trent Williams, Brian Orakpo and Alfred Morris were selected to the 2014 Pro Bowl. Orakpo was selected to replace 49ers outside linebacker Ahmad Brooks.
