= Taylor Lewan =

American football player (born 1991)

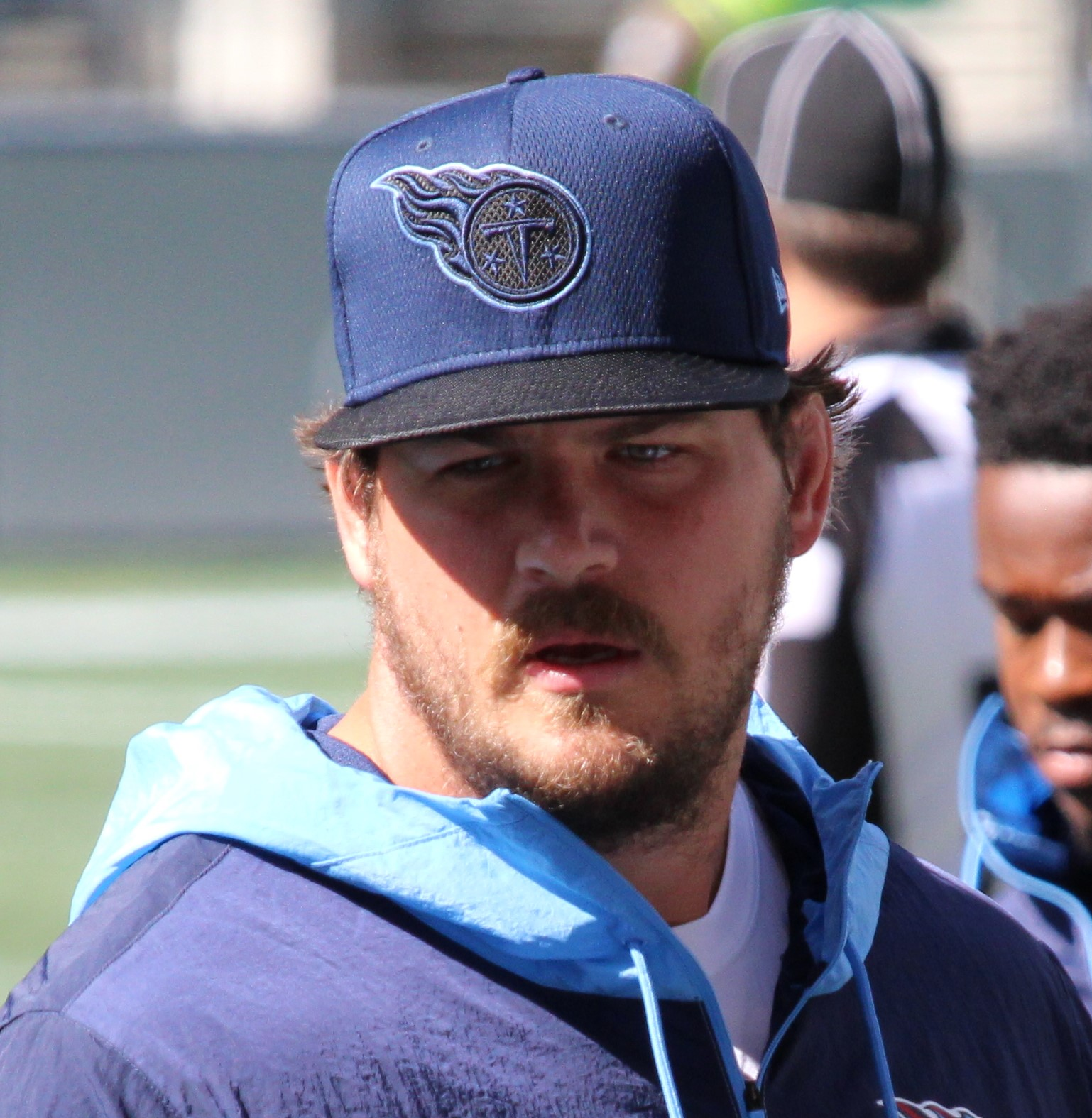
- Lewan with the Tennessee Titans in 2021

No. 77
- Position: Tackle

Personal information
- Born: July 22, 1991 (age 35); Loomis, California, U.S.
- Listed height: 6 ft 7 in (2.01 m)
- Listed weight: 309 lb (140 kg)

Career information
- High school: Chaparral (Scottsdale, Arizona)
- College: Michigan (2009–2013)
- NFL draft: 2014: 1st round, 11th overall pick

Career history
- Tennessee Titans (2014–2022)

Awards and highlights
- 3× Pro Bowl (2016–2018); PFWA All-Rookie Team (2014); 2× First-team All-American (2012, 2013); 2× Big Ten Offensive Lineman of the Year (2012, 2013); 2× First-team All-Big Ten (2012, 2013); Second-team All-Big Ten (2011)

Career NFL statistics
- Games played: 105
- Games started: 100
- Receptions: 1
- Receiving yards: 10
- Receiving touchdowns: 1
- Stats at Pro Football Reference

Taylor Curtis Lewan (born July 22, 1991) is an American former professional football player who was a tackle for nine seasons with the Tennessee Titans of the National Football League (NFL).

Lewan played college football for the Michigan Wolverines, twice earning first-team All-American honors, and was selected by the Titans in the first round of the 2014 NFL draft. During his NFL career, Lewan was named to three consecutive Pro Bowls from 2016 to 2018. He was released by the Titans in 2023 after sustaining season-ending knee injuries in two of his final three seasons. Since retiring, Lewan has co-hosted the podcast Bussin' With The Boys with former Titans teammate and longtime former NFL linebacker Will Compton.

== Early life ==
Lewan was born in Loomis, California, on July 22, 1991, to Dave Lewan and Kelly Riley. Dave was an offensive lineman at the University of Minnesota. Taylor played his first three years of high school football for Cactus Shadows High School in Cave Creek, Arizona. Lewan was a defensive end before transferring to Chaparral High School for his senior season, where he became an offensive lineman.

Lewan was rated as a four-star prospect by Rivals.com and Scout.com. He was selected as the fifth-best player in the state of Arizona and the 194th player nationally by Rivals.com. Lewan was listed as the No. 3 most athletic offensive lineman and the fifth-most agile offensive lineman according to Rivals.com. He was also a SuperPrep All-American and the nation's No. 10 overall offensive line prospect, and was selected to participate in the Under Armour All-America Game.

College recruiting
Name	Hometown	School	Height	Weight	40^{‡}	Commit date
Taylor Lewan; OT	Scottsdale, Arizona	Chaparral (AZ)	6 ft 6.5 in (1.99 m)	270 lb (120 kg)	4.645	Dec 14, 2008
Taylor Lewan; OT	Recruit ratings: Scout: Rivals: (80)					
Overall recruit ranking: Scout: 20 (OT) Rivals: 194, 16 (OT), 5 (AZ) ESPN: 148, 12 (OT)
Note: In many cases, Scout, Rivals, 247Sports, On3, and ESPN may conflict in their listings of height and weight.; In these cases, the average was taken. ESPN grades are on a 100-point scale.; Sources: "Michigan Football Commitments". Rivals.; "2009 Michigan Football Commits". Scout.; "ESPN". ESPN.; "Scout.com Team Recruiting Rankings". Scout.; "2009 Team Ranking". Rivals.com.

== College career ==
Lewan enrolled at the University of Michigan in 2009, where he majored in general studies, and redshirted his freshman year.

Although Lewan did not play in the 2010 season opener, he appeared in 11 games, including nine as a starter, during the 2010 season. In 2010, Lewan took over the starting left tackle role from Mark Huyge in the fourth game versus Bowling Green. Michigan's offense displayed one of the top rushing attacks in the country, with quarterback Denard Robinson as the team's leading rusher behind protection by Lewan and fellow offensive linemen David Molk, Patrick Omameh, Steven Schilling, and Perry Dorrestein. However, Lewan also displayed a knack for ill-timed, drive-killing penalties, mostly for false starts and personal fouls. These were attributed to his youth and aggressive nature on the field. In the first quarter of the Purdue game, he recovered a fumble and returned it for 11 yards. After the 2010 season, Lewan was named by CollegeFootballNews.com to its Freshman All-America second team.

As a redshirt sophomore in 2011, Lewan was a starting offensive tackle for the Wolverines. After avoiding penalties in Michigan's early games, he was praised for becoming a more intelligent player. Lewan was Michigan's starting left tackle in the first seven games of the season and was named to Phil Steele's Midseason All-Big Ten second team. Following the 2011 Big Ten Conference football season, Lewan earned second team All-conference recognition. He was an honorable mention All-American selectee by the Pro Football Weekly.

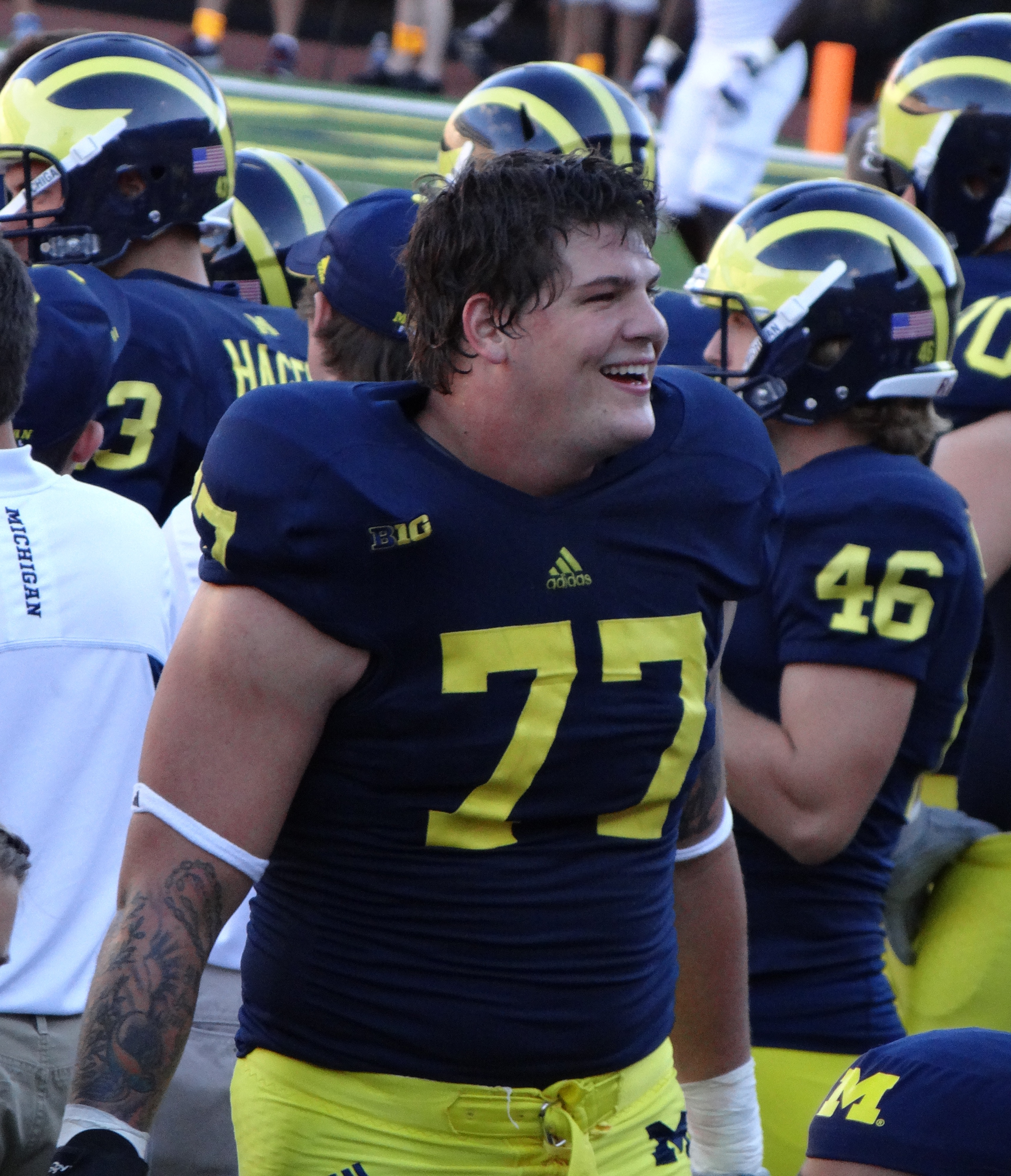
Lewan in 2012

Prior to the 2012 season, Lewan was selected by the media as one of five Big Ten Offensive players to watch along with teammate Denard Robinson as voted by the media. Following the season, Lewan was named the Big Ten Conference Offensive Lineman of the Year and named to the All-Big Ten first team by both the coaches and the media. Lewan was a 2012 College Football All-America Team selection by the Associated Press (1st team), ESPN (1st team), Walter Camp Football Foundation (1st team), Lindy's Sports (1st team), Sports Illustrated (1st team), CBSSports.com (2nd team), FoxSportsNext.com (Scout.com 2nd team), and Pro Football Weekly (honorable mention). CBSSports.com also named Lewan along with punter Will Hagerup to their All-Big Ten team.

In 2013, Lewan was named Big Ten Conference Offensive Lineman of the Year for the second season in a row.

== Professional career ==
Pre-draft measurables
Height	Weight	Arm length	Hand span	Wingspan	40-yard dash	10-yard split	20-yard split	20-yard shuttle	Three-cone drill	Vertical jump	Broad jump	Bench press
6 ft 7 1/8 in (2.01 m)	309 lb (140 kg)	33 7/8 in (0.86 m)	9 1/4 in (0.23 m)	6 ft 7 7/8 in (2.03 m)	4.87 s	1.71 s	2.84 s	4.49 s	7.39 s	30.5 in (0.77 m)	9 ft 9 in (2.97 m)	29 reps
All values from NFL Combine

=== 2014–2015: Early career ===
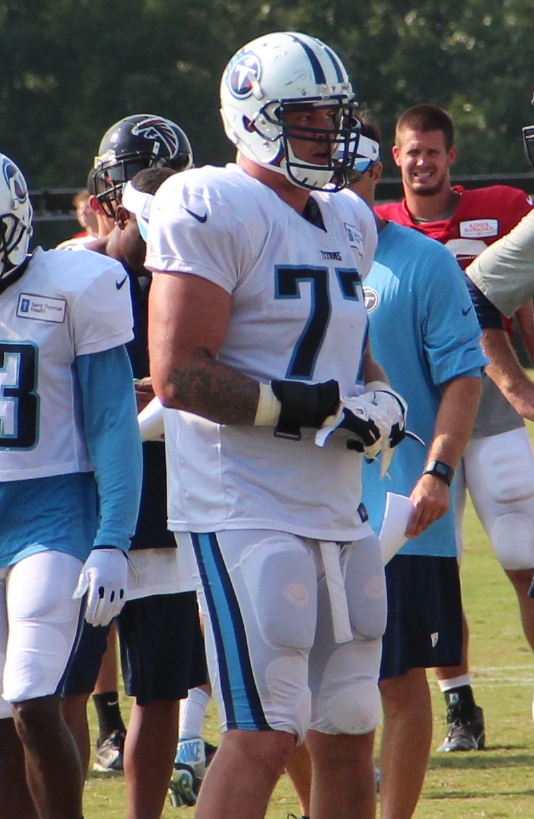
Lewan in 2014

Lewan was selected by the Tennessee Titans as the eleventh pick of the first round of the 2014 NFL draft. He signed a four-year $11.48 million fully guaranteed contract and a signing bonus of $6.67 million. In his rookie year in 2014, Lewan played in 11 games and started in six of them due to injuries. He was named to the PFWA All-Rookie team. The Titans finished the season with a 2–14 record, tying them with the Tampa Bay Buccaneers.

Coming into the 2015 season, Lewan was named the starting left tackle. He started in 15 games and allowed five sacks. The Titans finished with a league-worst record of 3–13.

=== 2016–2018: Pro Bowl seasons ===
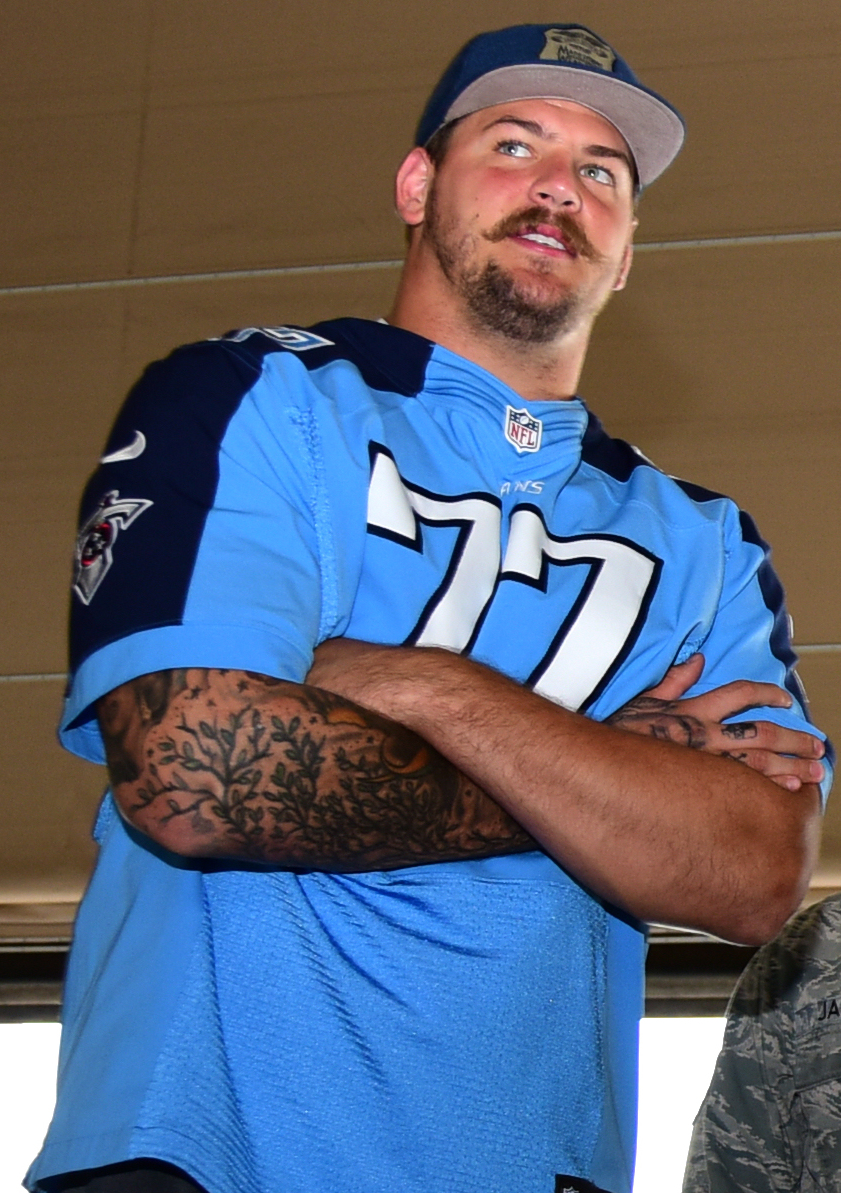
Lewan in 2016

In 2016, Lewan remained the starting left tackle, starting all 16 games and blocking for DeMarco Murray as he led the American Football Conference (AFC) in rushing yards and finished third in the league.

On October 23, 2016, Lewan scored his first NFL touchdown on a 10-yard pass from Marcus Mariota during a 34–26 loss to the Indianapolis Colts. Three weeks later, Lewan was ejected in the first quarter of the 47–25 victory over the Green Bay Packers after pushing a referee during an altercation with defensive tackle Letroy Guion. Lewan was selected to his first Pro Bowl for the 2016 season. The Titans finished with a 9–7 record and narrowly missed the playoffs. Lewan was ranked 72nd by his fellow players on the NFL Top 100 Players of 2017.

On April 25, 2017, the Titans picked up the fifth-year option on Lewan's rookie contract. He started all 16 games in 2017 as the Titans finished with another 9–7 record. On December 19, Lewan was named to his second Pro Bowl. He was ranked 78th by his fellow players on the NFL Top 100 Players of 2018.

On July 27, 2018, Lewan signed a five-year, $80 million contract extension with the Titans with $50 million guaranteed, making him the highest-paid offensive lineman in league history.

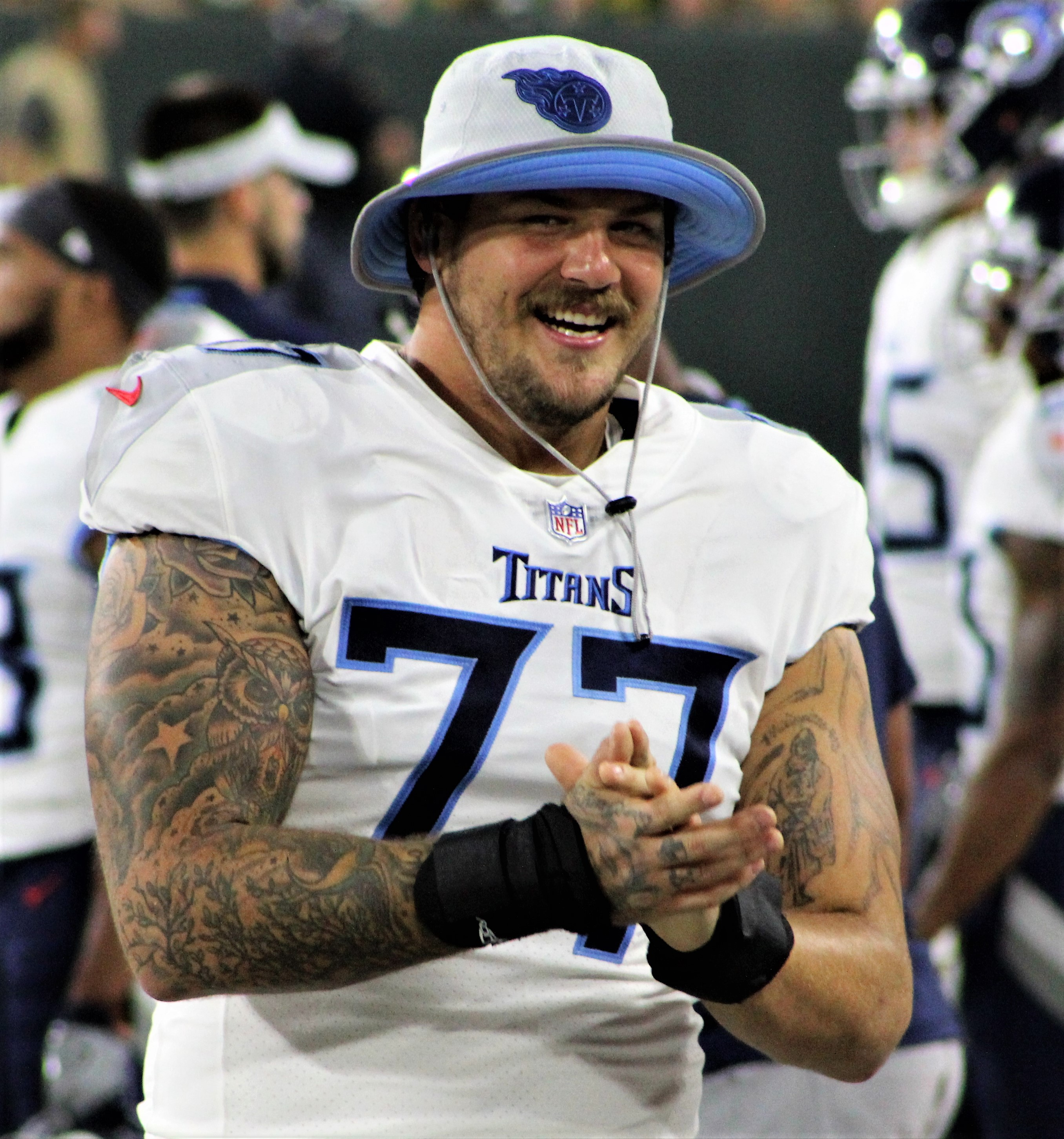
Lewan in 2018

During the season opening 27–20 road loss to the Miami Dolphins, Lewan suffered a concussion after a blind side hit by Andre Branch. Lewan missed the rest of the game and the next game against the Houston Texans. He returned from concussion protocol prior in Week 3 against the Jacksonville Jaguars. Branch was fined $10,026 for taunting following the hit. During a narrow 13–12 Week 5 loss to the Buffalo Bills, Lewan left the game early due to a foot injury. He had an MRI, but returned the next week against the Baltimore Ravens. On December 18, 2018, Lewan was selected to his third consecutive Pro Bowl. The Titans missed the playoffs due to a 33–17 loss to the Colts in the regular-season finale, finishing with a 9–7 record for the third consecutive year. Lewan finished the 2018 season playing in 15 games. He was ranked 77th by his fellow players on the NFL Top 100 Players of 2019.

=== 2019–2023: Later career ===
On July 24, 2019, Lewan announced in a video that he was suspended four games after failing a drug test for a banned substance. Lewan was reinstated from suspension on September 30 and was activated four days later. He started all 12 of the Titans' remaining regular-season games, blocking for Derrick Henry as he won the NFL rushing title. The Titans finished 9–7 for the fourth consecutive year and qualified for the playoffs, making it to their first AFC Championship Game since 2003 where they lost to eventual Super Bowl LIV champions, the Kansas City Chiefs. Lewan started all three of the Titans playoff games, blocking for Henry as he ran for almost 200 yards in each of the first two games.

Lewan started the first five games of the 2020 season. During a Week 6 42–36 overtime victory over the Texans, Lewan tore his ACL and was placed on injured reserve on October 19, 2020.

Lewan recovered in time for the start of the 2021 season and started 13 regular season games and in the Divisional Round against the Cincinnati Bengals.

Lewan suffered a knee injury in Week 2 of the 2022 season and was ruled out for the rest of the season. On February 10, 2023, Lewan announced that he believed the Titans would release him and that he would be considering retirement from playing. Lewan was released on February 22.

== Personal life ==
Lewan resides in Springfield, Tennessee with his wife, Taylin, and two daughters, Wynne and Willow. Lewan and former Titans teammate Will Compton started a podcast in the summer of 2019 called Bussin' With The Boys. In May 2023, Lewan filed a medical malpractice lawsuit against Dr. James Andrews over an October 2020 surgery to repair a torn ACL that left him with permanent damage.

In 2025, Lewan hosted the Netflix reality competition television series Battle Camp.

== Legal issues ==
Lewan had been accused of threatening a woman who was allegedly raped in 2009 by University of Michigan teammate Brendan Gibbons by saying, "I'm going to rape her because, [Gibbons] didn't." When asked about the incident at the NFL combine, Lewan stated, "I've said a lot of dumb things, but those are not things I've said. I would never disrespect a woman like that. I consider myself a guy who holds doors, not threatens people."

Lewan was charged with three misdemeanors for an assault in Ann Arbor on December 1, 2013. The charges stem from a confrontation that took place about 12:30 a.m. after Ohio State University defeated the University of Michigan, and two Buckeyes fans reported being assaulted. Lewan pleaded guilty to two misdemeanor charges -- disorderly person drunk and disturbing the peace -- as part of a plea agreement, dismissing the three previous assault charges.
