= Will Compton =

American football player (born 1989)

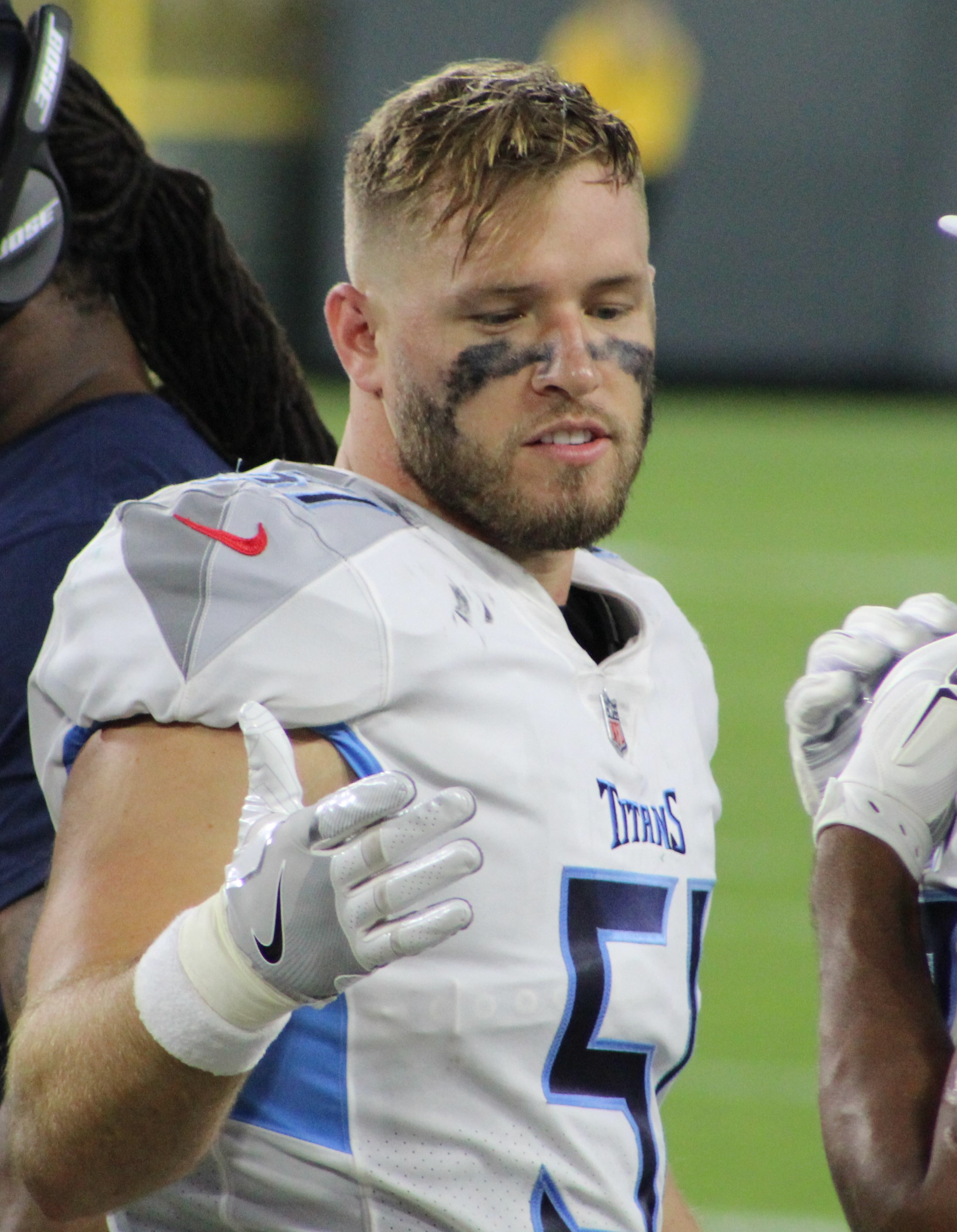
- Compton with the Tennessee Titans in 2018

No. 53, 51, 57
- Position: Linebacker

Personal information
- Born: September 19, 1989 (age 37); Overland Park, Kansas, U.S.
- Listed height: 6 ft 1 in (1.85 m)
- Listed weight: 235 lb (107 kg)

Career information
- High school: North County (Bonne Terre)
- College: Nebraska (2008–2012)
- NFL draft: 2013: undrafted

Career history
- Washington Redskins (2013–2017); Tennessee Titans (2018); New Orleans Saints (2019)*; Oakland Raiders (2019); Tennessee Titans (2020); Las Vegas Raiders (2021)
- * Offseason or practice squad member only

Awards and highlights
- Second-team All-Big Ten (2012)

Career NFL statistics
- Total tackles: 358
- Sacks: 1
- Forced fumbles: 2
- Fumble recoveries: 4
- Interceptions: 3
- Stats at Pro Football Reference

William Earl Compton III (born September 19, 1989) is an American former professional football player who was a linebacker in the National Football League (NFL) for nine seasons. He co-hosts a podcast, Bussin' With The Boys, with former Titans offensive tackle Taylor Lewan.

Compton played college football for the Nebraska Cornhuskers and signed with the Washington Redskins as an undrafted free agent in 2013. He was also a member of the Tennessee Titans, New Orleans Saints, and Oakland/Las Vegas Raiders.

== Early life ==
Compton was born in Overland Park, Kansas and grew up in Bonne Terre, Missouri. As a football player for North County High School in Bonne Terre, Compton played linebacker and wide receiver. A first-team all-state selection, he was listed as one of the top five players entering college from Missouri high schools. Compton chose the University of Nebraska–Lincoln over Notre Dame, Vanderbilt, and others.

== College career ==
Compton was redshirted in 2008. He won a starting position with the Cornhuskers the next year. Compton was a three-time Academic All-Big Ten selection, and he was team captain as a senior in 2012. Compton went on to play in the 2013 NFLPA Collegiate Bowl.

== Professional career ==
Pre-draft measurables
Height	Weight	Arm length	Hand span	Wingspan	40-yard dash	10-yard split	20-yard split	20-yard shuttle	Three-cone drill	Vertical jump	Broad jump	Bench press
6 ft 0 7/8 in (1.85 m)	230 lb (104 kg)	31 in (0.79 m)	9 in (0.23 m)	6 ft 1 1/8 in (1.86 m)	4.62 s	1.60 s	2.66 s	4.20 s	6.86 s	32 in (0.81 m)	9 ft 2 in (2.79 m)	24 reps
All values from Pro Day

=== Washington Redskins ===
==== 2013 season ====
On April 29, 2013, the Washington Redskins signed Compton to a three-year, $1.48 million contract that includes a signing bonus of $5,000 as an undrafted free agent. Throughout training camp, Compton competed for a roster spot as a backup inside linebacker against Jeremy Kimbrough, Keenan Robinson, and Brandon Jenkins.

On August 31, 2013, Compton was waived as a part of final roster cuts, but was signed to the team's practice squad after clearing waivers. On December 24, the team promoted Compton to the active roster after Nick Barnett sustained a sprained MCL. Five days later, Compton made his professional regular season debut and recorded one solo tackle as the Redskins lost 20–6 at the New York Giants. He finished his rookie season with one tackle in one game.

==== 2014 season ====
After the 2014 preseason, Compton remained on the active 53-man roster as a reserve inside linebacker. In Week 6 against the Arizona Cardinals, he made his first career start in place of an injured Perry Riley. In 2014, Compton ranked second on the team with 18 special teams stops.

==== 2015 season ====
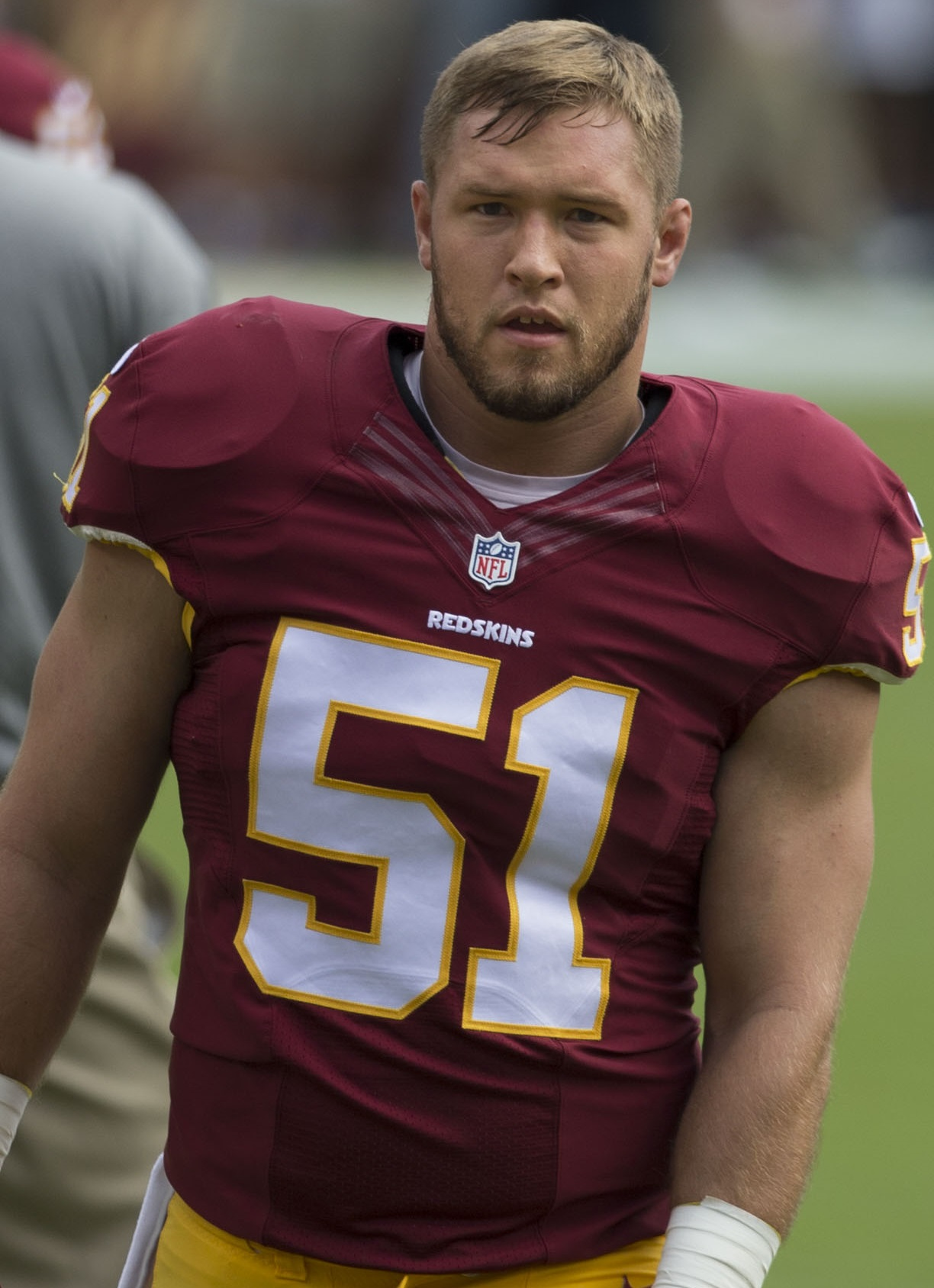
Compton in 2015

Originally beginning the 2015 season as a reserve inside linebacker, Compton filled in as a starter for an injured Keenan Robinson. Head coach Jay Gruden announced that Compton "cemented a role as a starter on this football team based on his play.” He recorded his first career interception on quarterback Kellen Moore in the last game of the regular season against the Dallas Cowboys. Due to starting ten games, he earned a $222,465.82 bonus. He finished the 2015 season with a career-best 122 tackles, a sack, an interception, six passes defensed, and a fumble recovery.

==== 2016 season ====
On March 4, 2016, the Redskins extended a tender to Compton. He started 15 games in 2016 recording 106 tackles, along with five passes defended, two fumble recoveries, one forced fumble and an interception.

==== 2017 season ====
The Redskins re-signed Compton signed on April 24, 2017, on a restricted free agent tender. He was placed on injured reserve on November 14 after suffering a Lisfranc sprain.

=== Tennessee Titans (first stint) ===
On April 2, 2018, Compton signed a one-year contract with the Tennessee Titans.

=== New Orleans Saints ===
Compton signed with the New Orleans Saints on August 21, 2019. He was placed on injured reserve nine days later. Compton was released from injured reserve with an injury settlement on September 5.

=== Oakland Raiders ===
On October 30, 2019, Compton was signed by the Oakland Raiders.

=== Tennessee Titans (second stint) ===
Compton re-signed with the Titans on August 27, 2020. He was released on October 26, and re-signed to the practice squad the next day. He was elevated to the active roster on November 21 and 28 for the team's Week 11 and 12 games against the Baltimore Ravens and Indianapolis Colts, and reverted to the practice squad after each game. He was promoted to the active roster on December 1.

=== Las Vegas Raiders ===
On December 8, 2021, Compton signed with the practice squad of the Las Vegas Raiders, and was signed to the active roster three days later.

On January 11, 2022, Compton was cut from the Raiders.

On November 21, 2022, Compton stated on social media he planned to sign with the practice squad of the Atlanta Falcons, but eight days later, Compton announced that the signing was unable to happen due to some of his affiliation with The Barstool Sportsbook.

=== Retirement ===
On September 3, 2023, Compton announced his retirement from professional football.

== NFL career statistics ==
Legend
**Bold**	Career high

=== Regular season ===
Year	Team	Games		Tackles					Interceptions					Fumbles			
Year	Team	GP	GS	Cmb	Solo	Ast	Sck	TFL	Int	Yds	TD	Lng	PD	FF	FR	Yds	TD
2013	WAS	1	0	1	1	0	0.0	0	0	0	0	0	0	0	0	0	0
2014	WAS	**16**	5	60	39	21	0.0	0	0	0	0	0	0	0	0	0	0
2015	WAS	**16**	10	96	52	44	**1.0**	1	**1**	**24**	0	**24**	3	0	1	0	0
2016	WAS	15	**15**	**106**	**61**	**45**	0.0	**5**	**1**	5	0	5	**5**	**1**	**2**	0	0
2017	WAS	9	3	19	13	6	0.0	0	**1**	2	0	2	3	0	0	0	0
2018	TEN	12	2	16	9	7	0.0	0	0	0	0	0	1	**1**	0	0	0
2019	OAK	9	4	41	26	15	0.0	0	0	0	0	0	0	0	0	0	0
2020	TEN	12	1	18	9	9	0.0	0	0	0	0	0	0	0	1	0	0
2021	LVR	2	0	1	0	1	0.0	0	0	0	0	0	0	0	0	0	0
Career		92	40	358	210	148	1.0	6	3	31	0	24	12	2	4	0	0

=== Playoffs ===
Year	Team	Games		Tackles					Interceptions					Fumbles			
Year	Team	GP	GS	Cmb	Solo	Ast	Sck	TFL	Int	Yds	TD	Lng	PD	FF	FR	Yds	TD
2015	WAS	**1**	**1**	**12**	**6**	**6**	0.0	0	0	0	0	0	0	0	0	0	0
2020	TEN	**1**	0	0	0	0	0.0	0	0	0	0	0	0	0	0	0	0
Career		2	1	12	6	6	0.0	0	0	0	0	0	0	0	0	0	0

== Personal life ==
In 2019, Compton created a podcast called Bussin' With The Boys, co-hosted by his former Titans teammate, offensive tackle Taylor Lewan. The podcast was originally part of the Barstool Sports podcast network; however, in 2025, the duo left Barstool, reportedly signing a three-year contract with FanDuel. In 2021, former Washington Football Team cheerleader Charo Bishop announced she was engaged to Compton. On June 26, 2021, Compton and Bishop got married in Montana. On April 3, 2022, the couple welcomed daughter Cerulean Belle.
