= David Amerson =

American football player (born 1991)

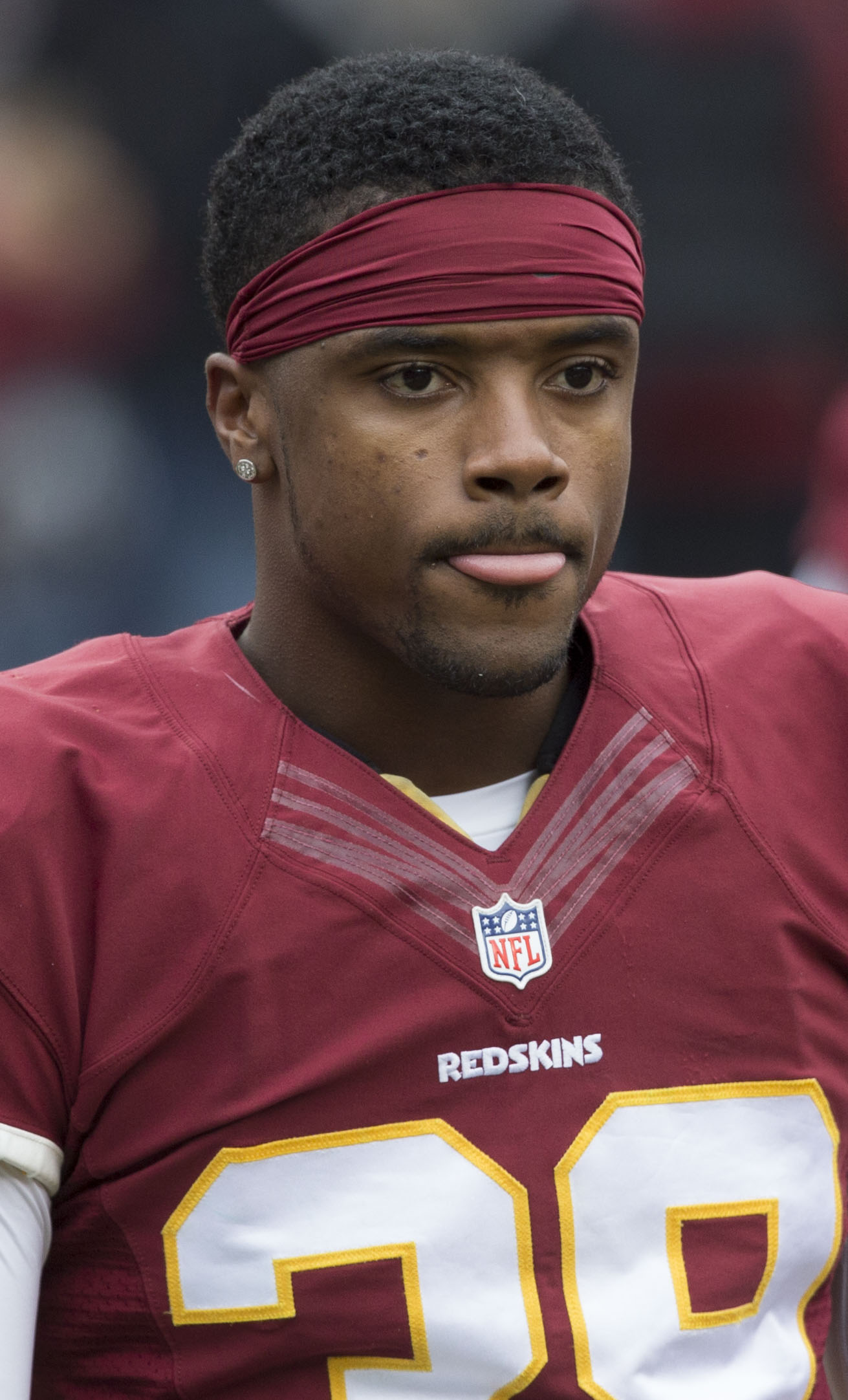
- Amerson with the Washington Redskins in 2014

No. 39, 29, 38
- Position: Cornerback

Personal information
- Born: December 8, 1991 (age 34); Honolulu, Hawaii, U.S.
- Listed height: 6 ft 1 in (1.85 m)
- Listed weight: 212 lb (96 kg)

Career information
- High school: James B. Dudley (Greensboro, North Carolina)
- College: NC State (2010–2012)
- NFL draft: 2013: 2nd round, 51st overall pick

Career history
- Washington Redskins (2013–2015); Oakland Raiders (2015–2017); Kansas City Chiefs (2018)*; Arizona Cardinals (2018)
- * Offseason or practice squad member only

Awards and highlights
- Jack Tatum Trophy (2011); First-team All-American (2011); First-team All-ACC (2011); Second-team All-ACC (2012)

Career NFL statistics
- Total tackles: 272
- Forced fumbles: 2
- Fumble recoveries: 1
- Pass deflections: 65
- Interceptions: 9
- Defensive touchdowns: 2
- Stats at Pro Football Reference

David Amerson (born December 8, 1991) is an American former professional football player who was a cornerback in the National Football League (NFL). He played college football for the NC State Wolfpack and was selected by the Washington Redskins in the second round of the 2013 NFL draft. He was also a member of the Oakland Raiders, Kansas City Chiefs, and Arizona Cardinals.

== Early life ==
Amerson was born in Honolulu, Hawaii. He attended James B. Dudley High School in Greensboro, North Carolina, and played for the Dudley Panthers high school football team. According to Rivals.com, he was a four-star college football recruit.

== College career ==
Amerson enrolled in North Carolina State University, where he played for the NC State Wolfpack football team from 2010 to 2012. As a true freshman in 2010, he started nine of 13 games and recorded 50 tackles. Through 11 games of his sophomore season in 2011, Amerson had 51 tackles and led the nation in interceptions with 13. The 13 interceptions beat Dré Bly's record for the most interceptions in a season in Atlantic Coast Conference (ACC) history. Following the 2011 season, he received the Jack Tatum Trophy for the best college defensive back, first-team All-American honors from the Walter Camp Football Foundation and ESPN, and first-team All-ACC honors.

At the inaugural Belk Bowl held in Charlotte on December 27, 2011, Amerson broke the record for the most interceptions in a season by an Atlantic Coast Conference competitor. This record of 13 interceptions also led the Football Subdivision during the 2011 season. He finished the game with five tackles, two interceptions, and one touchdown.

== Professional career ==
=== Pre-draft ===
Prior to his junior year, Amerson was widely projected to be a top-10 selection in the 2013 NFL draft. However, his draft stock dropped after a mediocre junior season. Coming out of North Carolina State, the majority of analysts and scouts projected Amerson as a second or third round pick. He was ranked the ninth-best cornerback by NFLDraftScout.com. Amerson was invited to the NFL Scouting Combine and completed most of the workouts and drills before injuring his groin that inevitably kept him from doing the three-cone drill and short shuttle. He also participated at NC State's Pro Day and made up the three-cone drill and short shuttle while also improving on his combine numbers in the vertical and broad jump.

Pre-draft measurables
| Height | Weight | Arm length | Hand span | 40-yard dash | 10-yard split | 20-yard split | 20-yard shuttle | Three-cone drill | Vertical jump | Broad jump | Bench press |
|---|---|---|---|---|---|---|---|---|---|---|---|
| 6 ft 1 in (1.85 m) | 205 lb (93 kg) | 32 5/8 in (0.83 m) | 10 1/2 in (0.27 m) | 4.44 s | 1.50 s | 2.50 s | 4.13 s | 6.75 s | 38 1/2 in (0.98 m) | 11 ft 0 in (3.35 m) | 15 reps |
All value from NFL Combine and North Carolina State's Pro Day.

The Washington Redskins selected Amerson in the second round (51st overall) of the 2013 NFL draft. He was the highest selected North Carolina State defensive back since Dewayne Washington in 1994 and was the seventh cornerback selected.

=== Washington Redskins ===
==== 2013 ====
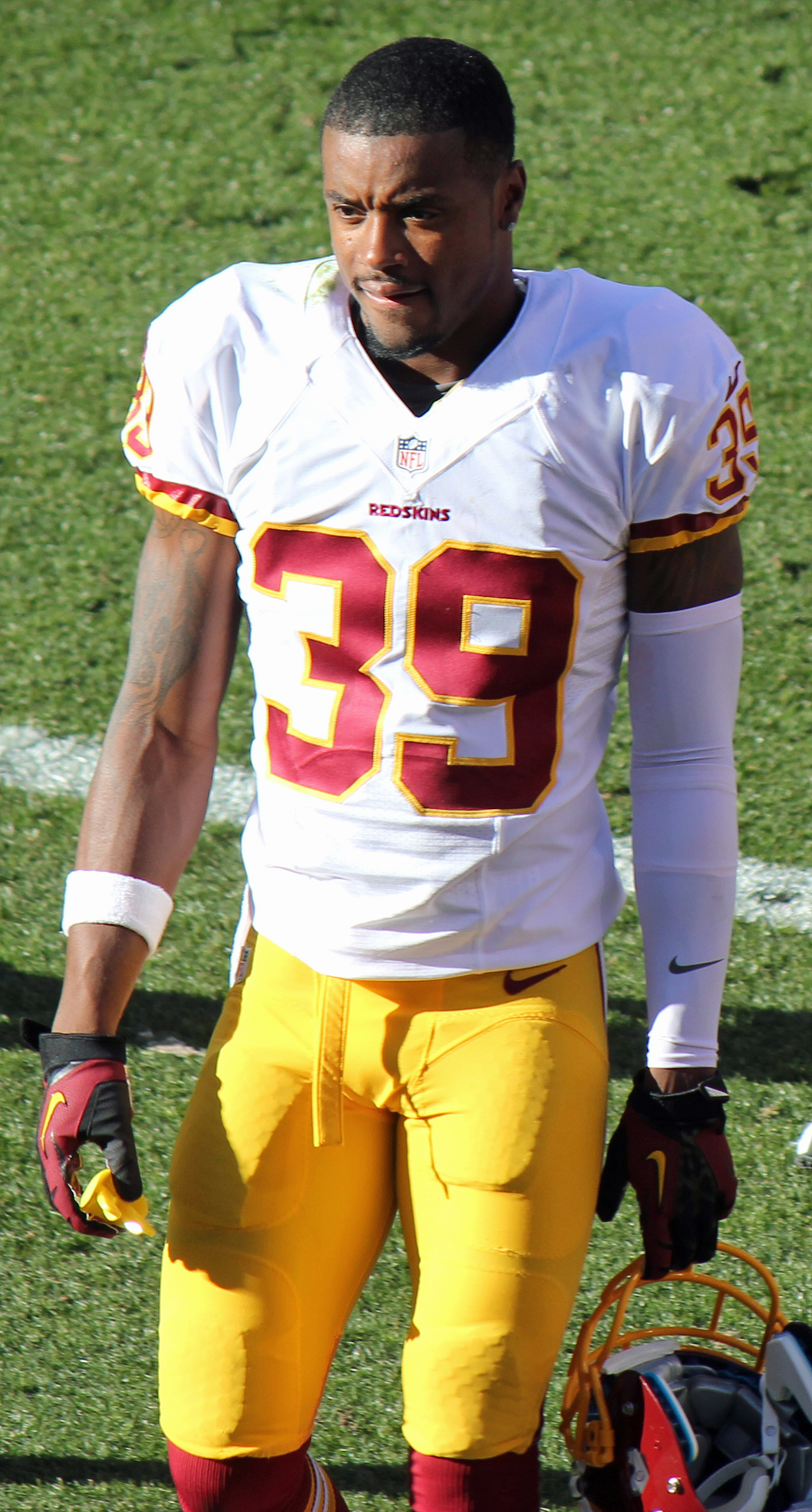
Amerson in his rookie season in 2013

On May 7, 2013, the Washington Redskins signed him to a four-year, $3.85 million contract with a signing bonus of $1.10 million.

He entered training camp competing with DeAngelo Hall, E. J. Biggers, and Josh Wilson. The Washington Redskins named him the third cornerback on the depth chart behind veterans Hall and Wilson to begin the season.

He made his professional regular-season debut and started the Washington Redskins' season-opener against the Philadelphia Eagles, making four combined tackles and a pass deflection in a 33–27 loss. The following week, he made a season-high six combined tackles during a 38-20 loss to the Green Bay Packers. On September 29, 2013, Amerson made a tackle and intercepted Matt Flynn, returning it for a 45-yard touchdown, in a 24-14 victory over the Oakland Raiders. It was his first career interception. During a Week 9 matchup against the San Diego Chargers, he tied his season-high of six combined tackles, made a pass deflection, and intercepted Philip Rivers in a 30-24 victory. He finished his rookie season with 48 combined tackles (40 solo), ten pass deflections, two interceptions, and a touchdown in 16 games and eight starts. The Washington Redskins finished with a 3-13 record and head coach Mike Shanahan was fired after the dismal season.

==== 2014 ====
Amerson competed in training camp with E. J. Biggers, Bashaud Breeland, and Tracy Porter for a starting cornerback position. Head coach Jay Gruden named him a starting cornerback, opposite DeAngelo Hall, to begin the regular season.

Amerson started the Washington Redskins' season-opener at the Houston Texans and collected five solo tackles in a 17–6 loss. On September 25, 2014, he recorded a season-high eight combined tackles in a 45–14 loss to the New York Giants. He was benched for a Week 12 contest with the San Francisco 49ers by head coach Jay Gruden after being late to a team meeting. His explanation was he had lost his cellphone that doubled as his alarm clock and overslept. Amerson finished the season with 61 combined tackles (52 solo) and seven pass deflections in 15 starts and 15 games.

==== 2015 ====
Amerson started his third season as the fourth cornerback on the Washington Redskins' depth chart behind DeAngelo Hall, Bashaud Breeland, and Chris Culliver. In the Redskins' season-opener, he made two solo tackles and a pass deflection in a 17–10 loss to the Miami Dolphins. The following week, Amerson was a healthy scratch in a 24–10 victory over the St. Louis Rams and was demoted in favor of Kyshoen Jarrett and Will Blackmon.

Amerson was waived by the Redskins on September 21, 2015.

=== Oakland Raiders ===
==== 2015 ====
On September 22, 2015, the Oakland Raiders claimed Amerson off waivers.

He picked up the team's defensive scheme well and played his first game for them just five days after being signed. On September 27, 2015, he had three total tackles in his Oakland Raiders' debut against the Cleveland Browns. Amerson worked his way up the depth chart and was the third cornerback behind D. J. Hayden and T. J. Carrie. In Week 9, Amerson recorded eight solo tackles and intercepted Ben Roethlisberger in a 38–35 loss to the Pittsburgh Steelers. On November 29, 2015, he made two solo tackles a season-high six pass deflections, and intercepted Marcus Mariota in a 24–21 win over the Tennessee Titans. His six deflections set a new single-game, franchise record. During a Week 15 matchup against the Green Bay Packers, Amerson recorded six solo tackles, three pass deflections, and intercepted Aaron Rodgers in a 30-20 loss. On January 3, 2016, he made two solo tackles, deflected a pass, and intercepted Alex Smith, returning it for a 24-yard touchdown, for his fourth pick of the season during a 23–17 loss to the Kansas City Chiefs. He was second in the NFL with 25 passes defended during the 2015 season and was named most improved player by Pro Football Focus. Amerson finished his first season with the Raiders with a total of 60 combined tackles (55 solo), 26 pass deflections, four interceptions, and a touchdown in 14 games and 12 starts.

==== 2016 ====
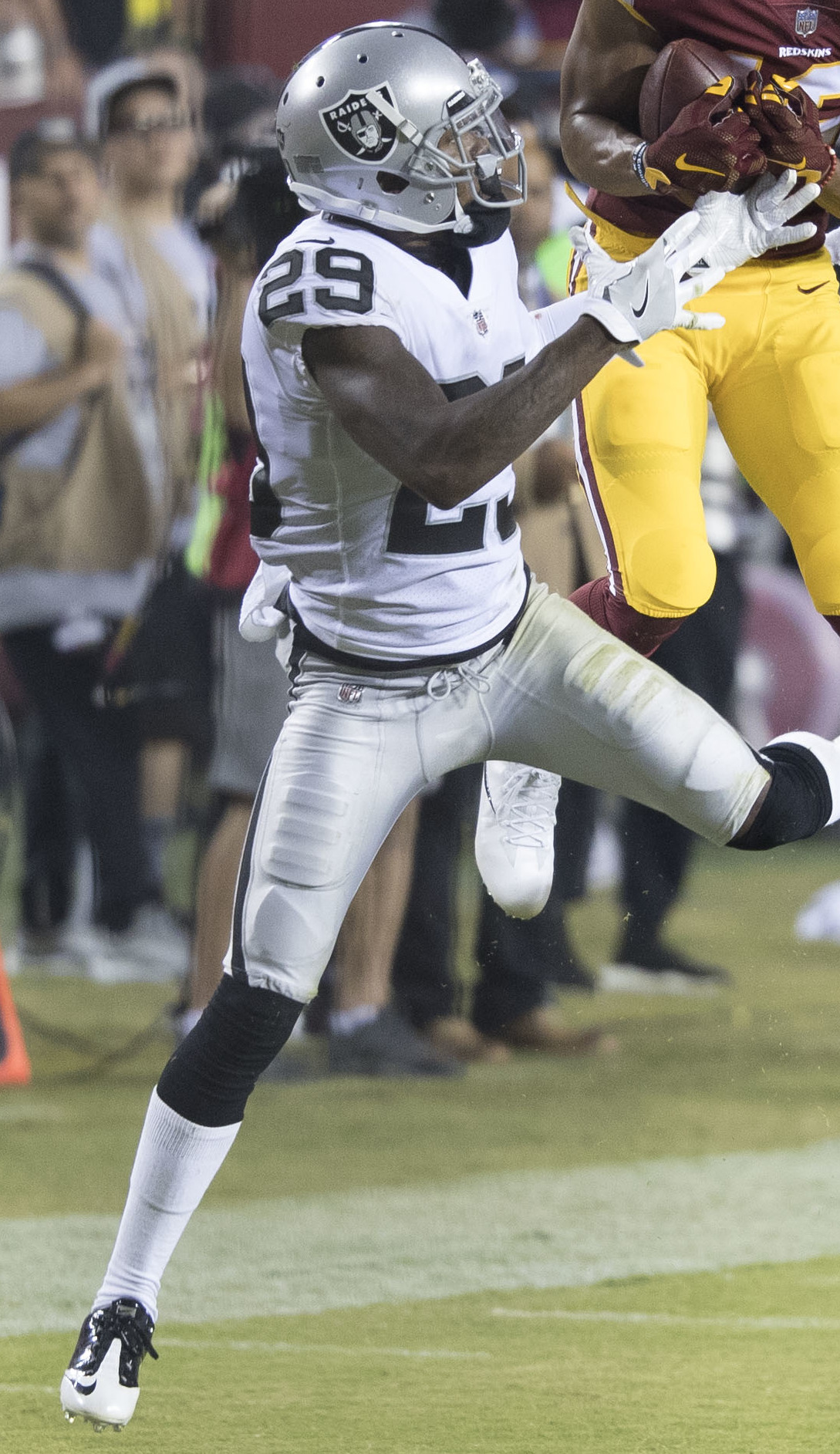
Amerson with the Raiders in 2017

On July 15, 2016, the Raiders signed Amerson to a four-year, $35 million contract with $17.5 million guaranteed.

Amerson and Sean Smith were named the starting cornerbacks to begin the regular season with T. J. Carrie named the nickel back. He started the Oakland Raiders' season-opener against the New Orleans Saints and made four solo tackles in a 35–34 victory. The following game, Amerson recorded a season-high eight combined tackles, three pass deflections, and intercepted Atlanta Falcons' quarterback Matt Ryan during a 35-28 loss. On October 23, 2016, he had four solo tackles, two pass deflections, and intercepted Blake Bortles, as the Raiders routed the Jacksonville Jaguars, 33–16. He finished the season with 64 combined tackles (56 solo), 16 pass deflections, and two interceptions in 15 games and 15 starts.

The Raiders finished 12-4 and were second in the AFC West. On January 7, 2017, Amerson started in his first career postseason game and recorded three combined tackles in a 27-14 loss in the AFC Wildcard game to the Houston Texans.

==== 2017 ====
Amerson competed with rookie Gareon Conley throughout training camp for the starting cornerback position. Head coach Jack Del Rio named Amerson and Smith the starting cornerbacks to start the 2017 season.

He started in the Oakland Raiders' season-opener against the Tennessee Titans and recorded two solo tackles in a 26–16 victory. On September 24, 2017, Amerson made a season-high six combined tackles and defended three passes during a 10-27 loss to his former team, the Washington Redskins. After he suffered a foot injury in Week 7, he was unable to play for the rest of the season and missed nine consecutive games.

On February 5, 2018, Amerson was released by the Raiders.

=== Kansas City Chiefs ===
On February 16, 2018, Amerson signed a one-year contract with the Kansas City Chiefs, He was released on September 1, 2018.

=== Arizona Cardinals ===
On November 13, 2018, Amerson was signed by the Arizona Cardinals. He played in six games with five starts, recording 21 tackles, two passes defensed, and one interception, which came off Russell Wilson in a Week 17 loss to the Seattle Seahawks.

On June 13, 2019, the Cardinals released Amerson.

== NFL career statistics ==
| Year | Team | Games | | Tackles | | | | Interceptions | | | | | |
| Year | Team | GP | GS | Cmb | Solo | Ast | Sck | Int | Yds | Avg | Lng | TD | PD |
|---|---|---|---|---|---|---|---|---|---|---|---|---|---|
| 2013 | WAS | 16 | 8 | 48 | 40 | 8 | 0.0 | 2 | 45 | 22.5 | 45 | 1 | 10 |
| 2014 | WAS | 15 | 15 | 61 | 52 | 9 | 0.0 | 0 | 0 | 0.0 | 0 | 0 | 7 |
| 2015 | WAS | 2 | 0 | 2 | 2 | 0 | 0.0 | 0 | 0 | 0.0 | 0 | 0 | 1 |
| 2015 | OAK | 14 | 12 | 58 | 53 | 5 | 0.0 | 4 | 28 | 7.0 | 24 | 1 | 25 |
| 2016 | OAK | 15 | 15 | 64 | 56 | 8 | 0.0 | 2 | 0 | 0.0 | 0 | 0 | 16 |
| 2017 | OAK | 6 | 6 | 18 | 14 | 4 | 0.0 | 0 | 0 | 0.0 | 0 | 0 | 4 |
| 2018 | ARI | 6 | 5 | 21 | 17 | 4 | 0.0 | 1 | 25 | 25.0 | 25 | 0 | 2 |
| Total | | 74 | 61 | 272 | 234 | 38 | 0.0 | 9 | 98 | 10.9 | 45 | 2 | 65 |

== Personal life ==
Amerson is childhood friends with wide receiver Keenan Allen, who was also selected in the 2013 NFL draft by the San Diego Chargers.
