= Jeremy Kimbrough =

American football player (born 1991)

Profile
- Position: Linebacker

Personal information
- Born: May 22, 1991 (age 35); Decatur, Georgia
- Listed height: 5 ft 10 in (1.78 m)
- Listed weight: 231 lb (105 kg)

Career information
- College: Appalachian State

Career history
- Washington Redskins (2013)
- Stats at Pro Football Reference

Jeremy Derean Kimbrough (born May 22, 1991) is an American former football linebacker. He played college football at Appalachian State and was signed as an undrafted free agent by the Washington Redskins of the National Football League (NFL).

He spent his rookie season on injured reserve due to a torn labrum, and was cut during the 2014 preseason. Kimbrough then went on to work for NASCAR, graduating through their Drive for Diversity crew development program in 2016. He currently works as a front tire carrier of the No. 99 team driven by Daniel Suárez in the NASCAR Cup Series. He previously worked with the No. 1 team driven by Kurt Busch.
