= John Potter (American football) =

American football player (born 1990)

No. 3, 1
- Position: Placekicker

Personal information
- Born: January 24, 1990 (age 36); Kalamazoo, Michigan, U.S.
- Listed height: 6 ft 1 in (1.85 m)
- Listed weight: 219 lb (99 kg)

Career information
- High school: Grand Haven (MI)
- College: Western Michigan
- NFL draft: 2012: 7th round, 251st overall pick

Career history
- Buffalo Bills (2012); Washington Redskins (2013); Detroit Lions (2014)*; Miami Dolphins (2014)*
- * Offseason or practice squad member only

Career NFL statistics
- Field goals made: 3
- Field goals attempted: 4
- Field goal percentage: 75
- Longest field goal: 43
- Stats at Pro Football Reference

John Potter (born January 24, 1990) is an American former professional football player who was a placekicker in the National Football League (NFL). The Buffalo Bills selected him in the seventh round of the 2012 NFL draft. He played college football for the Western Michigan Broncos.

== College career ==
Potter left Western Michigan as the all-time leader in career points (333), consecutive point after touchdowns (PATs) made in a season (57) and consecutive PATs made in a career (129). His 129 consecutive PATs is also a Mid-American Conference (MAC) record. Potter recorded 36 touchbacks his senior season which ranked third in the nation. Potter also holds the school record for tackles by a kicker (36). In addition, he scored a rushing touchdown on a fake field goal, ran in a two-point conversion and recovered two fumbles on kickoff coverage.

Potter was named third-team All-MAC his junior and senior season. He was also named conference special teams player of the week four times. He was named the first-team Academic All-American his senior season and graduated summa cum laude.

== Professional career ==
=== Buffalo Bills ===
Potter was selected in the seventh round, 251st overall, by the Buffalo Bills in the 2012 NFL draft. He was the kickoff specialist for the first six weeks of the season, registering 13 touchbacks on 26 kickoffs. He was released on November 6, 2012.

=== Washington Redskins ===
Potter signed with the Washington Redskins on June 12, 2013. He was released on August 26, 2013. The Redskins re-signed him on September 14 after an injury to the incumbent kicker Kai Forbath. Potter made 3 of 4 Field Goals in 3 games with the Redskins. On October 1, 2013, he was released, along with Phillip Merling, in order to make room on the roster for the reinstatement of Rob Jackson and Jarvis Jenkins.

=== Detroit Lions ===
The Detroit Lions signed Potter to a futures contract at the conclusion of the 2013 season. He was released on May 12, 2014.

=== Miami Dolphins ===
Potter was signed by the Miami Dolphins after the team's first 2014 preseason game. Potter was 3 for 3 in field goals including kicks from 48 and 51 yards. The Dolphins waived an injured Potter on August 25, 2014.
