= 2010 Washington Redskins season =

NFL team season

- Owner: Daniel Snyder
- General manager: Bruce Allen
- Head coach: Mike Shanahan
- Offensive coordinator: Kyle Shanahan
- Defensive coordinator: Jim Haslett
- Home stadium: FedExField

Results
- Record: 6–10
- Division place: 4th NFC East
- Playoffs: Did not qualify
- Pro Bowlers: LB London Fletcher; LB Brian Orakpo; CB DeAngelo Hall

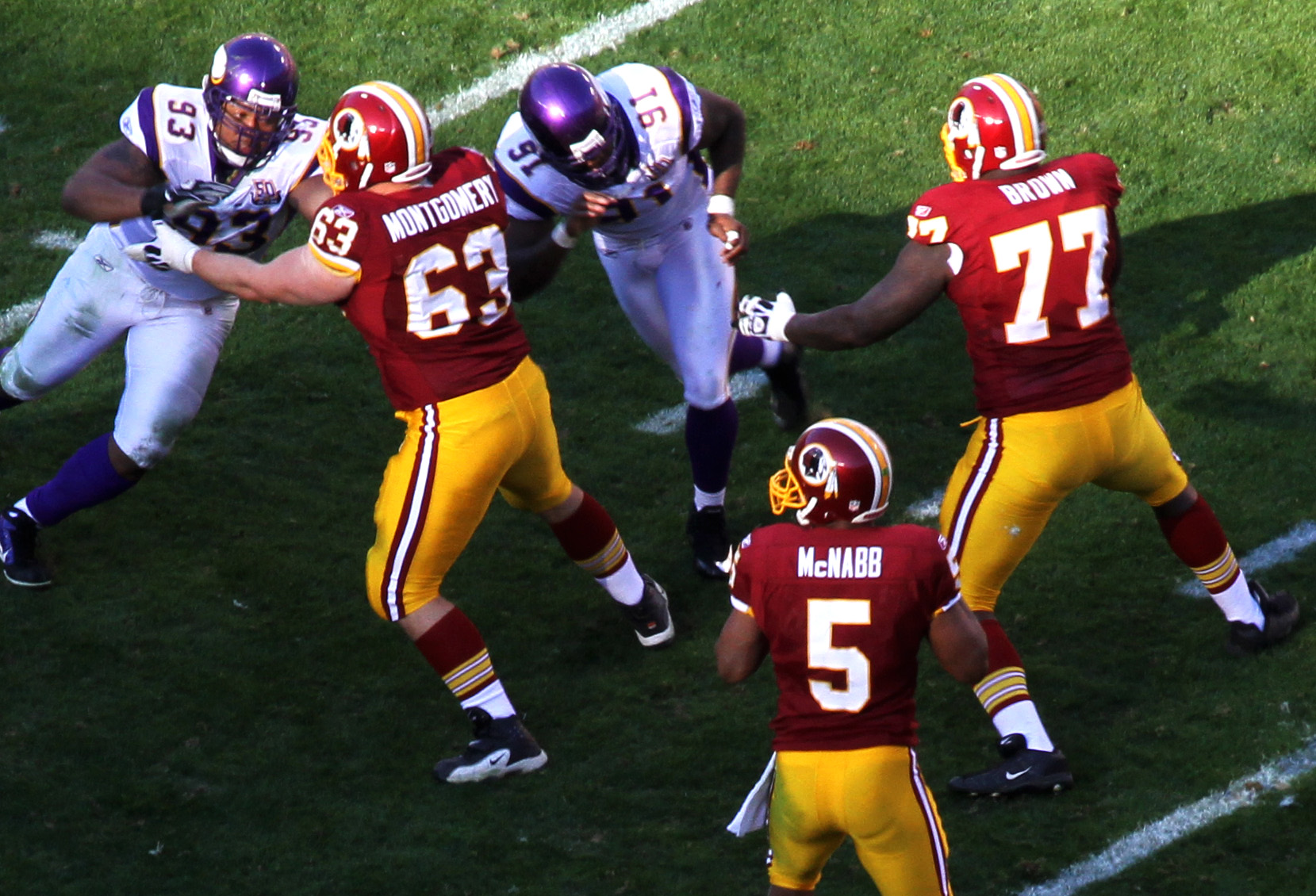
Donovan McNabb prepares to pass against the Minnesota Vikings in week 12, November 28

The 2010 season was the Washington Redskins' 79th in the National Football League (NFL) and their first under new head coach Mike Shanahan, who also began his term as the team's Vice President of Football Operations. The Redskins obtained the 4th pick in the 2010 NFL draft as a result of their 4–12 record from their previous season, which they used to draft Oklahoma tackle Trent Williams. Finishing the season 6–10, the Redskins improved on their 4–12 record from the 2009 season, but were officially eliminated from postseason contention in Week 14. Of the 16 games of the season, only four (all losses) were decided by more than a single possession.

With new starting quarterback Donovan McNabb, who replaced Jason Campbell (traded to Oakland), Washington aimed to improve upon their previous failing seasons. However, upon Week 15 and a rating of 77.1 (25th overall in the league), Shanahan would bench McNabb in favor of their second-string Rex Grossman (who was the quarterback for the 2006 Chicago Bears that went to play in the Super Bowl).

== Players ==
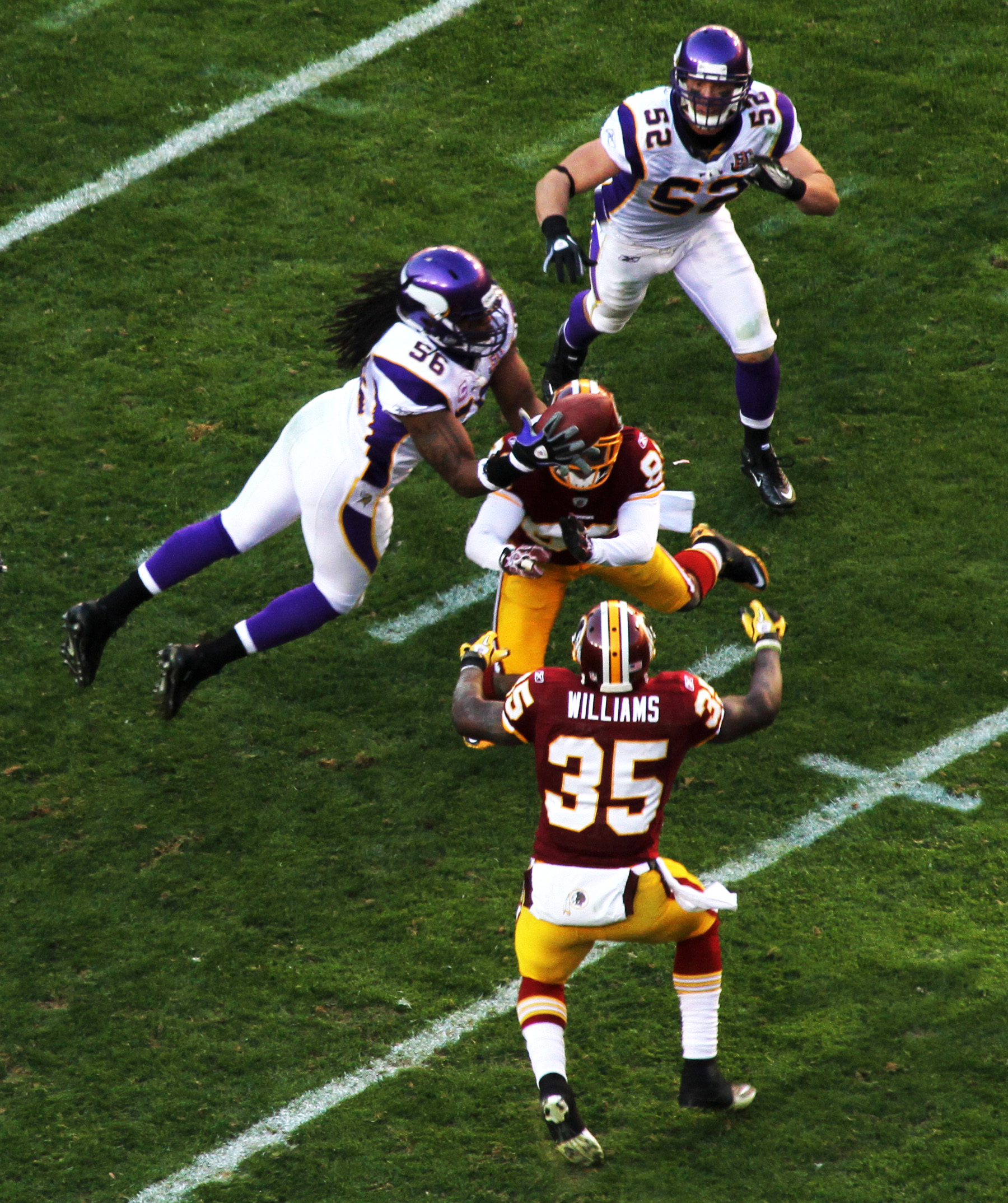
Washington concedes an interception against Minnesota in week 12

=== Movement ===
The Redskins released RBs Rock Cartwright and Ladell Betts, WR Antwaan Randle El, OG Randy Thomas, DT Cornelius Griffin and CB Fred Smoot on March 4, 2010, one day before the start of free agency.

On April 4, the Redskins traded a 2010 2nd round pick and either a 3rd or 4th round pick in 2011 for veteran Eagles QB Donovan McNabb. The conditional 3rd/4th round pick is reflective on McNabb's performance during the season.

On April 24, the Redskins traded QB Jason Campbell to the Oakland Raiders for a 2012 4th round pick. The Jason Campbell trade had been anticipated ever since the Donovan McNabb trade a few weeks before.

On June 19, the Redskins addressed their need for a strong offensive line by trading a third or fourth in 2011 (reflective on the Donovan McNabb trade) to the New Orleans Saints for Pro Bowl OT Jammal Brown.

=== Free agents in 2010 ===
RFA: Restricted free-agent, UFA: Unrestricted free-agent, ERFA: Exclusive rights free agent

Position	Player	Free agency tag	Date signed	2010 team
LS	Ethan Albright	UFA	September 28	San Diego Chargers
DT	Lorenzo Alexander	RFA	March 5	Washington Redskins
RB	Ladell Betts	Released	September 22	New Orleans Saints
QB	Jason Campbell	RFA	April 24	Oakland Raiders
RB	Rock Cartwright	Released	April 27	Oakland Raiders
QB	Todd Collins	Released	August 23	Chicago Bears
DE	Phillip Daniels	UFA	March 5	Washington Redskins
FS	Reed Doughty	RFA	May 26	Washington Redskins
RB	Quinton Ganther	ERFA		Seattle Seahawks
DT	Kedric Golston	RFA		
DT	Cornelius Griffin	Released		
OT	Stephon Heyer	RFA	April 14	Washington Redskins
OT	Levi Jones	UFA		
LB	Rocky McIntosh	RFA	June 14	Washington Redskins
DT	Anthony Montgomery	RFA	April 14	Washington Redskins
C	Will Montgomery	RFA	March 13	Washington Redskins
C	Casey Rabach	UFA	March 5	Washington Redskins
WR	Antwaan Randle El	Released	March 8	Pittsburgh Steelers
CB	Carlos Rogers	RFA	July 29	Washington Redskins
CB	Fred Smoot	Released		
P	Hunter Smith	UFA	October 7	Washington Redskins
G	Randy Thomas	Released		Miami Dolphins
OL	Mike Williams	UFA	March 5	Washington Redskins
LB	Chris Wilson	RFA	March 25	Washington Redskins
DE	Renaldo Wynn	UFA		
TE	Todd Yoder	UFA		

=== 2010 NFL draft ===
The Redskins finished the 2009 season with a record of 4–12 and will be picking 4th overall.

2010 Washington Redskins draft
Round	Pick	Player	Position	College	Notes
1	4	Trent Williams *	OT	Oklahoma	
4	103	Perry Riley	LB	LSU	
6	174	Dennis Morris	TE	Louisiana Tech	from Washington via Miami
7	219	Terrence Austin	WR	UCLA	from Miami
7	229	Erik Cook	C	New Mexico	from New England
7	231	Selvish Capers	G	West Virginia	from Philadelphia via New England, Denver and New England
Made roster * Made at least one Pro Bowl during career

==== Transactions involving 2010 draft picks ====
- The Redskins traded their second round pick and a third or fourth round pick in 2011 to the Eagles for quarterback Donovan McNabb.
- The Redskins forfeited their third round pick for selecting defensive end Jeremy Jarmon in the 2009 Supplemental Draft.
- The Redskins traded their sixth round pick along with a second round pick in 2009 to the Dolphins for defensive end Jason Taylor

== Staff ==
Washington Redskins 2010 staff
Front office: Owner – Daniel Snyder; General manager – Bruce Allen; Executive vice president – Mike Shanahan; Vice president of football administration – Eric Schaffer; Director of player personnel – Scott Campbell; Director of pro personnel – Morocco Brown; Head coaches: Head coach – Mike Shanahan; Assistant head coach/running backs – Bobby Turner; Offensive coaches: Offensive coordinator – Kyle Shanahan; Quarterbacks – Matt LaFleur; Wide receivers – Keenan McCardell; Tight ends – Jon Embree; Offensive line – Chris Foerster; Offensive assistant – Sean McVay; Offensive coaching assistant - Matt Applebaum; Offensive coaching assistant – Richmond Flowers III	Defensive coaches: Defensive coordinator – Jim Haslett; Defensive line – Jacob Burney; Linebackers – Lou Spanos; Defensive backs – Bob Slowik; Safeties – Steve Jackson; Defensive assistant – Kirk Olivadotti; Special teams coaches: Special teams coordinator – Danny Smith; Assistant special teams – Richard Hightower; Strength and conditioning: Head strength and conditioning – Ray Wright; Assistant strength and conditioning – Chad Englehart; Strength and conditioning – Malcolm Blacken

== Final roster ==
2010 Washington Redskins roster
Quarterbacks (QB): 3 John Beck; 8 Rex Grossman; 5 Donovan McNabb; Running backs (RB): 40 Andre Brown; 24 James Davis; 45 Mike Sellers FB; 46 Ryan Torain; 35 Keiland Williams; 36 Darrel Young FB; Wide receivers (WR): 13 Anthony Armstrong; 18 Terrence Austin; 16 Brandon Banks; 89 Santana Moss; 87 Roydell Williams; Tight ends (TE): 47 Chris Cooley; 86 Fred Davis; 82 Logan Paulsen	Offensive linemen (OL): 77 Jammal Brown T; 58 Erik Cook C; 66 Derrick Dockery G; 74 Stephon Heyer T; 75 Artis Hicks G; 78 Kory Lichtensteiger G; 63 Will Montgomery G; 61 Casey Rabach C; 71 Trent Williams T; Defensive linemen (DL): 76 Anthony Bryant NT; 94 Adam Carriker DE; 91 Vonnie Holliday DE; 90 Jeremy Jarmon DE; 73 Joe Joseph NT; 72 Darrion Scott DE	Linebackers (LB): 97 Lorenzo Alexander OLB; 54 H. B. Blades ILB; 99 Andre Carter OLB; 59 London Fletcher ILB; 50 Rob Jackson OLB; 52 Rocky McIntosh ILB; 98 Brian Orakpo OLB; 56 Perry Riley ILB; 95 Chris Wilson OLB; Defensive backs (DB): 25 Kevin Barnes FS; 31 Phillip Buchanon CB; 37 Reed Doughty SS; 23 DeAngelo Hall CB; 20 Macho Harris FS; 29 Reggie Jones CB; 38 Sha'reff Rashad FS; 22 Carlos Rogers CB; 34 Byron Westbrook CB; Special teams (ST): 4 Graham Gano K; 1 Sam Paulescu P; 57 Nick Sundberg LS	Practice squad: 60 Selvish Capers T; 69 Rashaad Duncan NT; 24 Doug Dutch CB; 67 Xavier Fulton T; 80 Taurus Johnson WR; 39 Shawnbrey McNeal RB; 79 Vince Oghobaase DE; 83 Maurice Price WR; Reserve: 6 Josh Bidwell P (IR); 93 Phillip Daniels DE (IR); 85 Mike Furrey WR (IR); 64 Kedric Golston DE (IR); 92 Albert Haynesworth DE (Susp.); 51 Robert Henson ILB (IR); 48 Chris Horton SS (IR); 12 Malcolm Kelly WR (IR); 96 Maʻake Kemoeatu NT (IR); 30 LaRon Landry SS (IR); 41 Kareem Moore FS (IR); 68 Clint Oldenburg T (IR); 26 Clinton Portis RB (IR); 67 Craig Robinson DE (IR); 32 Anderson Russell FS (IR); 29 Chad Simpson RB (IR); -- Mike Williams G (NF-Ill.); Rookies in italics 53 active, 17 reserve, 8 practice squad

== Schedule ==
=== Preseason ===
The Redskins preseason schedule was announced on March 31, 2010.

Week	Date	Opponent	Result	Record	Venue	Recap
1	August 13	Buffalo Bills	W 42–17	1–0	FedExField	Recap
2	August 21	Baltimore Ravens	L 3–23	1–1	FedExField	Recap
3	August 27	at New York Jets	W 16–11	2–1	New Meadowlands Stadium	Recap
4	September 2	at Arizona Cardinals	L 10–20	2–2	University of Phoenix Stadium	Recap

=== Regular season ===
Week	Date	Opponent	Result	Record	Venue	Recap
1	September 12	Dallas Cowboys	W 13–7	1–0	FedExField	Recap
2	September 19	Houston Texans	L 27–30 (OT)	1–1	FedExField	Recap
3	September 26	at St. Louis Rams	L 16–30	1–2	Edward Jones Dome	Recap
4	October 3	at Philadelphia Eagles	W 17–12	2–2	Lincoln Financial Field	Recap
5	October 10	Green Bay Packers	W 16–13 (OT)	3–2	FedExField	Recap
6	October 17	Indianapolis Colts	L 24–27	3–3	FedExField	Recap
7	October 24	at Chicago Bears	W 17–14	4–3	Soldier Field	Recap
8	October 31	at Detroit Lions	L 25–37	4–4	Ford Field	Recap
9	Bye					
10	November 15	Philadelphia Eagles	L 28–59	4–5	FedExField	Recap
11	November 21	at Tennessee Titans	W 19–16 (OT)	5–5	LP Field	Recap
12	November 28	Minnesota Vikings	L 13–17	5–6	FedExField	Recap
13	December 5	at New York Giants	L 7–31	5–7	New Meadowlands Stadium	Recap
14	December 12	Tampa Bay Buccaneers	L 16–17	5–8	FedExField	Recap
15	December 19	at Dallas Cowboys	L 30–33	5–9	Cowboys Stadium	Recap
16	December 26	at Jacksonville Jaguars	W 20–17 (OT)	6–9	EverBank Field	Recap
17	January 2	New York Giants	L 14–17	6–10	FedExField	Recap

== Standings ==
NFC East
	W	L	T	PCT	DIV	CONF	PF	PA	STK
^{(3)} Philadelphia Eagles	10	6	0	.625	4–2	7–5	439	377	L2
New York Giants	10	6	0	.625	3–3	8–4	394	347	W1
Dallas Cowboys	6	10	0	.375	3–3	4–8	394	436	W1
Washington Redskins	6	10	0	.375	2–4	4–8	302	377	L1

== Preseason results ==
Preseason Week 1 – vs Buffalo Bills

Quarter	1	2	3	4	Total
Bills	3	0	7	7	17
Redskins	7	14	14	7	42

at Fedex Field, Landover, Maryland

- Date: August 13, 2010
- Game weather: 75 °F (24 °C), cloudy
- Game attendance: 69,578
- Recap

Game information
- Passing: R. Grossman (WAS) – 11/18 140 yards, 2 TD, 0 INT
- Rushing: C. Simpson (BUF) – 7 ATT 67 yards, 0 TD
- Receiving: D. Thomas (WAS) – 3 REC 64 yards, 1 TD

Preseason Week 2 – vs Baltimore Ravens

Quarter	1	2	3	4	Total
Ravens	0	13	7	3	23
Redskins	3	0	0	0	3

at Fedex Field, Landover, Maryland

- Date: August 21, 2010
- Game weather: 88 °F (31 °C), sunny
- Game attendance: 72,994
- Recap

Game information
- Passing: D. McNabb (WAS)- 11/26 206 yards, 0 TD, 1 INT
- Rushing: H. Nakamura (BAL)- 1 ATT 51 yards, 0 TD
- Receiving: A. Armstrong (WAS)- 4 REC 82 yards, 0 TD

Preseason Week 3 – vs New York Jets

Quarter	1	2	3	4	Total
Redskins	3	3	3	7	16
Jets	3	2	0	6	11

at New Meadowlands Stadium, East Rutherford, New Jersey

- Date: August 27, 2010
- Game weather: TBA
- Game attendance: 50,508
- Recap

Game information
- Passing: M. Sanchez (NYJ) – 13/21 139 yards, 1 TD, 1 INT
- Rushing: L. Tomlinson (NYJ) – 11 ATT 86 yards, 0 TD
- Receiving: D. Keller (NYJ) – 5 REC 46 yards, 1 TD

Preseason Week 4 – vs Arizona Cardinals

Quarter	1	2	3	4	Total
Redskins	3	0	0	7	10
Cardinals	3	7	10	0	20

at University of Phoenix Stadium, Glendale, Arizona

- Date: September 2, 2010
- Game weather: 68 °F (20 °C)
- Game attendance: 61,509
- Recap

Game information
- Passing: J. Beck (WAS) – 11/21 132 yards, 0 TD, 1 INT
- Rushing: W. Parker (WAS) – 7 ATT 35 yards, 0 TD
- Receiving: T. Austin (WAS) – 5 REC 94 yards, 1 TD

== Regular season results ==
=== Week 1: vs. Dallas Cowboys ===
Week 1: Dallas Cowboys at Washington Redskins – Game summary

Quarter	1	2	3	4	Total
Cowboys	0	0	7	0	7
Redskins	3	7	0	3	13

at FedExField, Landover, Maryland

- Game time: 8:20 pm EDT (7:20 pm CDT)
- Game weather: 66 °F (19 °C) (Cloudy)
- Game attendance: 90,670
- Referee: Tony Corrente
- TV announcers (NBC): Al Michaels, Cris Collinsworth, and Andrea Kremer
- Recap

Game information

First quarter

- WAS – Graham Gano 29-yard field goal, Redskins 3–0, Drive: 12 plays, 69 yards, 6:26.

Second quarter

- WAS – DeAngelo Hall 32 fumble return (Graham Gano kick), Redskins 10–0.

Third quarter

- DAL – Miles Austin 4-yard pass from Tony Romo (David Buehler kick), Redskins 10–7, Drive: 6 plays, 34 yards, 3:26.

Fourth quarter

- WAS – Graham Gano 49-yard field goal, Redskins 13–7, Drive: 10 plays, 46 yards, 4:24.

Top passers

- DAL – Tony Romo – 31/47, 282 yards, 1 touchdown
- WAS – Donovan McNabb – 15/32, 171 yards

Top rushers

- DAL – Marion Barber – 8 rushes, 39 yards
- WAS – Clinton Portis – 18 rushes, 63yards

Top receivers

- DAL – Miles Austin – 10 receptions, 146 yards, 1 touchdown
- WAS – Chris Cooley – 6 receptions, 80 yards

Top tacklers

- DAL – Alan Ball – 6 tackles, 1 forced fumble; DeMarcus Ware – 6 tackles, 1 sack
- WAS – LaRon Landry – 13 tackles, 4 assists

The Redskins began their season at home on Sunday night against their NFC East rival, the Dallas Cowboys. In the first quarter, Washington delivered the opening punch as kicker Graham Gano got a 29-yard field goal. The Redskins would then close out the second quarter with cornerback DeAngelo Hall returning a fumble 25 yards for a touchdown.

The Cowboys would get on the board in the third quarter as quarterback Tony Romo found wide receiver Miles Austin on a 4-yard touchdown pass. Washington would respond in the fourth quarter as Gano nailed a 49-yard field goal. Afterwards, Dallas appeared to have won the game as Romo completed a 13-yard touchdown pass to wide receiver Roy Williams, but a holding call on offensive tackle Alex Barron preserved the Redskins victory.

With the win, Washington began its season at 1–0.

=== Week 2: vs. Houston Texans ===
Week 2: Houston Texans at Washington Redskins – Game summary

Quarter	1	2	3	4	OT	Total
Texans	0	7	10	10	3	30
Redskins	6	14	7	0	0	27

at FedExField, Landover, Maryland

- Date: September 19
- Game time: 4:15 pm. EDT/3:15 pm. CDT
- Game weather: 85 °F (29 °C) (Sunny)
- Game attendance: 88,240
- Referee: Jeff Triplette
- TV announcers (CBS): Ian Eagle and Dan Fouts
- Recap

Game information

First quarter

- WAS – Graham Gano 41-yard field goal, Redskins 3–0, Drive: 9 plays, 57 yards, 5:23.
- WAS – Graham Gano 27-yard field goal, Redskins 6–0, Drive: 5 plays, 33 yards, 2:11.

Second quarter

- HOU – Jacoby Jones 5-yard pass from Matt Schaub (Neil Rackers kick), Texans 7–6, Drive: 11 plays, 77 yards, 5:52.
- WAS – Clinton Portis 1-yard run (Graham Gano kick), Redskins 13–7, Drive: 5 plays, 73 yards, 2:27.
- WAS – Clinton Portis 1-yard run (Graham Gano kick), Redskins 20–7, Drive: 4 plays, 63 yards, 0:59.

Third quarter

- HOU – Neil Rackers 47-yard field goal, Redskins 20–10, Drive: 11 plays, 56 yards, 5:38.
- WAS – Chris Cooley 22-yard pass from Donovan McNabb (Graham Gano kick), Redskins 27–10, Drive: 9 plays, 92 yards, 5:31.
- HOU – Kevin Walter 6-yard pass from Matt Schaub (Neil Rackers kick), Redskins 27–17, Drive: 6 plays, 78 yards, 3:51.

Fourth quarter

- HOU – Neil Rackers 43-yard field goal, Redskins 27–20, Drive: 5 plays, 40 yards, 2:05.
- HOU – Andre Johnson 34-yard pass from Matt Schaub (Neil Rackers kick), Tied 27–27, Drive: 8 plays, 81 yards, 1:13.

Overtime

- HOU – Neil Rackers 35-yard field goal, Texans 30–27, Drive: 7 plays, 41 yards, 3:48.

Top passers

- HOU – Matt Schaub – 38/52, 497 yards, 3 touchdowns, 1 interception
- WAS – Donovan McNabb – 28/38, 426 yards, 1 touchdown

Top rushers

- HOU – Arian Foster – 19 rushes, 69 yards
- WAS – Clinton Portis – 13 rushes, 33 yards, 2 touchdowns

Top receivers

- HOU – Andre Johnson – 12 receptions, 158 yards, 1 touchdown
- WAS – Santana Moss – 10 receptions, 89 yards

Top tacklers

- HOU – Zac Diles, Glover Quin – 5 tackles, 3 assists
- WAS – Reed Doughty – 10 tackles, 4 assists

Coming off their win over the Cowboys the Redskins played on home ground for an interconference duel with the Texans. In the 1st quarter the Redskins scored first as kicker Graham Gano got a 41 and a 27-yard field goal. In the second quarter the Redskins fell behind with QB Matt Schaub completing a 5-yard TD pass to WR Jacoby Jones, but got the lead back when RB Clinton Portis got two 1-yard TD runs to put the Redskins up 20–7. The Texans tried to cut the lead in the third quarter as kicker Neil Rackers nailed a 47-yard field goal, but the Redskins increased their lead with QB Donovan McNabb completing a 22-yard TD pass to TE Chris Cooley. The Texans went on a scoring rally to tie the game when QB Matt Schaub made a 6-yard TD pass to WR Kevin Walter, followed in the 4th quarter by Rackers making a 43-yard field goal. Then Schaub threw a 34-yard TD pass to WR Andre Johnson. The decision was made when Rackers booted a 35-yard field goal in overtime to give the Redskins a loss.

With the loss, the Redskins fell to 1–1.

=== Week 3: at St. Louis Rams ===
Week 3: Washington Redskins at St. Louis Rams – Game summary

Quarter	1	2	3	4	Total
Redskins	0	13	3	0	16
Rams	14	0	7	9	30

at Edward Jones Dome, St. Louis, Missouri

- Date: September 26
- Game time: 4:05 pm. EDT
- Game weather: None (dome stadium)
- Game attendance: 52,370
- Referee: Walt Coleman
- TV announcers (Fox): Dick Stockton, Charles Davis, Jim Mora & Laura Okmin
- Recap

Game information

First quarter

- STL – Steven Jackson 42-yard run (Josh Brown kick), Rams 7–0, Drive: 8 plays, 60 yards, 3:29.
- STL – Daniel Fells 3-yard pass from Sam Bradford (Josh Brown kick), Rams 14–0, Drive: 2 plays, 3 yards, 0:41.

Second quarter

- WAS – Graham Gano 29-yard field goal, Rams 14–3, Drive: 6 plays, 53 yards, 1:58.
- WAS – Santana Moss 21-yard pass from Donovan McNabb (Graham Gano kick), Rams 14–10, Drive: 1 plays, 21 yards, 0:06.
- WAS – Graham Gano 24-yard field goal, Rams 14–13, Drive: 8 plays, 77 yards, 4:54.

Third quarter

- WAS – Graham Gano 21-yard field goal, Redskins 16–14, Drive: 5 plays, 70 yards, 2:21.
- STL – Kenneth Darby 12-yard run (Josh Brown kick), Rams 21–16, Drive: 12 plays, 74 yards, 5:24.

Fourth quarter

- STL – Josh Brown 37-yard field goal, Rams 24–16, Drive: 11 plays, 46 yards, 5:20.
- STL – Josh Brown 29-yard field goal, Rams 27–16, Drive: 9 plays, 41 yards, 4:31.
- STL – Josh Brown 36-yard field goal, Rams 30–16, Drive: 7 plays, 23 yards, 1:55.

Top passers

- WAS – Donovan McNabb – 19/32, 236 yards, 1 touchdown, 1 interception
- STL – Sam Bradford – 23/37, 235 yards, 1 touchdown, 1 interception

Top rushers

- WAS – Ryan Torain – 7 rushes, 46 yards
- STL – Steven Jackson – 10 rushes, 58 yards, 1 touchdown

Top receivers

- WAS – Santana Moss – 6 receptions, 124 yards, 1 touchdown
- STL – Mark Clayton – 5 receptions, 85 yards

Top tacklers

- WAS – London Fletcher – 8 tackles, 1 assist
- STL – James Laurinaitis – 6 tackles, 1 assist

Coming off their heartbreaking overtime loss at home against the Texans, the Redskins traveled to Edward Jones Dome to take on the St. Louis Rams. In the first quarter, the Rams scored first with a 42-yard TD run from Steven Jackson for a 7–0 lead. following their next possession the Rams scored again with Sam Bradford connecting with Daniel Fells for a 3-yard TD Pass to go up 14–0. In the second quarter the Redskins were able to get on the board with Graham Gano kicking a 29-yard field goal, followed by them scoring a TD with Donovan McNabb connecting with Santana Moss for a 21-yard TD pass. While Gano was able to kick a 24-yard field goal to make it 14–13 at the half, in the third quarter the Redskins were only able to score with Gano kicking a 21-yard FG while Kenneth Darby responded with a 12-yard TD run. In the 4th quarter Josh Brown kicked a 37, 29 & 41-yard field goals, sealing a Redskins loss.

With the loss, Washington fell to 1–2.

=== Week 4: at Philadelphia Eagles ===
Week 4: Washington Redskins at Philadelphia Eagles – Game summary

Quarter	1	2	3	4	Total
Redskins	14	3	0	0	17
Eagles	0	6	0	6	12

at Lincoln Financial Field, Philadelphia, Pennsylvania

- Date: October 3
- Game time: 4:15 pm. EDT
- Game weather: 63 °F (17 °C), cloudy
- Game attendance: 69,144
- Referee: Alberto Riveron
- TV announcers (Fox): Joe Buck, Troy Aikman and Pam Oliver
- Recap

Game information

First quarter

- WAS – Ryan Torain 12-yard run (Graham Gano kick), Redskins 7–0, Drive: 3 plays, 39 yards, 1:09.
- WAS – Chris Cooley 31-yard pass from Donovan McNabb (Graham Gano kick), Redskins 14–0, Drive: 9 plays, 78 yards, 4:25.

Second quarter

- PHI – David Akers 49-yard field goal, Redskins 14–3, Drive: 10 plays, 43 yards, 4:52.
- WAS – Graham Gano 26-yard field goal, Redskins 17–3, Drive: 11 plays, 72 yards, 5:44.
- PHI – David Akers 23-yard field goal, Redskins 17–6, Drive: 16 plays, 69 yards, 8:52.

Third quarter

- No scoring plays

Fourth quarter

- PHI – Brent Celek 5-yard pass from Kevin Kolb (pass failed), Redskins 17–12, Drive: 9 plays, 65 yards, 3:31.

Top passers

- WAS – Donovan McNabb – 8/19, 125 yards, 1 touchdown, 1 interception
- PHI – Kevin Kolb – 22/35, 201 yards, 1 touchdown, 1 interception

Top rushers

- WAS – Ryan Torain – 18 rushes, 70 yards, 1 touchdown
- PHI – LeSean McCoy – 16 rushes, 64 yards

Top receivers

- WAS – Anthony Armstrong – 1 reception, 57 yards
- PHI – LeSean McCoy – 12 receptions, 110 yards

Top tacklers

- WAS – London Fletcher – 10 tackles, 2 assists
- PHI – Quintin Mikell – 7 tackles

Trying to snap a two-game losing streak, the Redskins flew to Lincoln Financial Field for a Week 4 NFC East duel with the Philadelphia Eagles, as quarterback Donovan McNabb made his highly anticipated return to Philadelphia.

Washington came out strong in the first quarter as running back Ryan Torain got a 12-yard touchdown run, followed by McNabb's 31-yard touchdown pass to tight end Chris Cooley. The Eagles answered in the second quarter as kicker David Akers made a 49-yard field goal, yet the Redskins came right back with kicker Graham Gano getting a 26-yard field goal. Afterwards, Philadelphia closed out the half with Akers' 23-yard field goal. After a scoreless third quarter, the Eagles tried to rally in the fourth quarter as quarterback Kevin Kolb completed a 5-yard touchdown pass to tight end Brent Celek (with a failed two-point conversion), but Washington's defense would prevent any further progress.

With the win, the Redskins improved to 2–2.

=== Week 5: vs. Green Bay Packers ===
Week 5: Green Bay Packers at Washington Redskins – Game summary

Quarter	1	2	3	4	OT	Total
Packers	7	3	3	0	0	13
Redskins	0	3	0	10	3	16

at FedExField, Landover, Maryland

- Date: October 10
- Game time: 1:00 pm. EDT
- Game weather: 72 °F (22 °C) (Sunny)
- Game attendance: 87,760
- Referee: Gene Steratore
- TV announcers (Fox): Joe Buck, Troy Aikman, & Pam Oliver
- Recap

Game information

First quarter

- GB – Donald Lee 5-yard pass from Aaron Rodgers (Mason Crosby kick), Packers 7–0, Drive: 6 plays, 90 yards, 3:18.

Second quarter

- GB – Mason Crosby 52-yard field goal, Packers 10–0, Drive: 4 plays, −1 yards, 1:26.
- WAS – Graham Gano 26-yard field goal, Packers 10–3, Drive: 12 plays, 78 yards, 3:58.

Third quarter

- GB – Mason Crosby 36-yard field goal, Packers 13–3, Drive: 9 plays, 70 yards, 4:21.

Fourth quarter

- WAS – Anthony Armstrong 48-yard pass from Donovan McNabb (Graham Gano kick), Packers 13–10, Drive: 2 plays, 60 yards, 0:36.
- WAS – Graham Gano 45-yard field goal, Tied 13–13, Drive: 7 plays, 53 yards, 2:51.

Overtime

- WAS – Graham Gano 33-yard field goal, Redskins 16–13, Drive: 6 plays, 24 yards, 3:24.

Top passers

- GB – Aaron Rodgers – 27/46, 293 yards, 1 touchdown, 1 interception
- WAS – Donovan McNabb – 26/49, 357 yards, 1 touchdown, 1 interception

Top rushers

- GB – Brandon Jackson – 10 rushes, 115 yards
- WAS – Ryan Torain – 16 rushes, 40 yards

Top receivers

- GB – James Jones – 4 receptions, 65 yards
- WAS – Santana Moss – 7 receptions, 118 yards

Top tacklers

- GB – Desmond Bishop – 6 tackles, 7 assists, 1 sack
- WAS – LaRon Landry – 10 tackles, 3 assists, 1 interception, 1 forced fumble

Coming off their win over the Eagles the Redskins played on home ground for an NFC duel with the Packers. In the first quarter the Redskins trailed early as QB Aaron Rodgers completed a 5-yard TD pass to TE Donald Lee. This was followed in the 2nd quarter by kicker Mason Crosby hitting a 52-yard field goal. The Redskins replied with kicker Graham Gano getting a 26-yard field goal. Then in the third quarter Crosby made a 36-yard field goal to put the Packers up 13–3. The Redskins rallied with QB Donovan McNabb completing a 48-yard TD pass to WR Anthony Armstrong, followed by Gano making a 45-yard-field goal. At overtime, the decision was made when Gano successfully put away a 33-yard field goal to win the game for the Redskins.

With the win, Washington improved to 3–2.

=== Week 6: vs. Indianapolis Colts ===
Week 6: Indianapolis Colts at Washington Redskins – Game summary

Quarter	1	2	3	4	Total
Colts	7	10	7	3	27
Redskins	7	0	10	7	24

at FedExField; Landover, Maryland

- Date: October 17
- Game time: 8:20 pm EST
- Game weather: 70 °F (21 °C) (Sunny)
- Game attendance: 87,883
- Referee: John Parry
- TV announcers (NBC): Al Michaels, Cris Collinsworth and Andrea Kremer
- Recap

Game information

First quarter

- IND – (9:56) Pierre Garçon 57-yard reception from Peyton Manning (Adam Vinatieri kick) Drive: 1 play, 57 yards, 0:09. (Colts 7–0)
- WAS – (1:29) Ryan Torain 11-yard run (Graham Gano kick) Drive: 10 plays, 89 yards, 5:22. (7–7)

Second quarter

- IND – (12:44) Austin Collie 5-yard reception from Peyton Manning (Adam Vinatieri kick). Drive: 12 plays, 84 yards, 3:38. (Colts 14–7)
- IND – (2:05) Adam Vinatieri 43-yard field goal. Drive: 9 plays, 53 yards, 3:06. (Colts 17–7)

Third quarter

- WAS – (11:23) Ryan Torain 1-yard run (Graham Gano kick). Drive: 4 plays, 13 yards, 1:31. (Colts 17–14)
- IND – (9:27) Joseph Addai 13-yard run (Adam Vinatieri kick). Drive: 4 plays, 66 yards, 1:57. (Colts 24–14)
- WAS – (3:58) Graham Gano 39-yard field goal. Drive: 5 plays, 18 yards, 2:13. (Colts 24–17)

Fourth quarter

- IND – (8:45) Adam Vinatieri 33-yard field goal. Drive: 8 plays, 49 yards, 4:07. (Colts 27–17)
- WAS – (2:46) Keiland Williams 8-yard reception from Donovan McNabb (Graham Gano kick). Drive: 12 plays, 92 yards, 5:55. (Colts 27–24)

Top passers

- IND – Peyton Manning – 25/38, 307 yards, 2 TD, 0 INT
- WAS – Donovan McNabb – 29/45, 246 yards, 1 TD, 2 INT

Top rushers

- IND – Joseph Addai 17 carries, 128 yards, 1 TD
- WAS – Ryan Torain 20 carries, 100 yards, 2 TD

Top receivers

- IND – Pierre Garçon – 4 receptions, 103 yards, 1 TD
- WAS – Santana Moss – 8 receptions, 77 yards, 0 TD

Top tacklers

- IND – Jerraud Powers (11)
- WAS – London Fletcher (14)

Coming off their thrilling overtime win over the Packers, the Redskins stayed at home for a Week 6 interconference duel with the Indianapolis Colts on Sunday night. Washington trailed early in the first quarter as Colts quarterback Peyton Manning completed a 57-yard touchdown pass to wide receiver Pierre Garçon. The Redskins answered with a 9-yard touchdown run from running back Ryan Torain. Indianapolis struck back in the second quarter as Manning threw a 5-yard touchdown pass to wide receiver Austin Collie, followed by kicker Adam Vinatieri's 43-yard field goal.

Washington began to claw back into the game in the third quarter as Torain got a 1-yard touchdown run, but the Colts continued to flex their offensive muscle as running back Joseph Addai got a 13-yard touchdown run. The Redskins continued to stay close as kicker Graham Gano booting a 39-yard field goal. In the fourth quarter, Indianapolis continued to add onto their lead as Vinatieri made a 33-yard field goal. Washington tried to rally as quarterback Donovan McNabb hooked up with running back Keiland Williams on an 8-yard touchdown pass, but the Colts' defense would prevent any further progress.

With the loss, the Redskins fell to 3–3.

=== Week 7: at Chicago Bears ===
Week 7: Washington Redskins at Chicago Bears – Game summary

Quarter	1	2	3	4	Total
Redskins	7	3	7	0	17
Bears	7	7	0	0	14

at Soldier Field, Chicago, Illinois

- Date: October 24
- Game time: 1:00 pm. EDT/12:00 pm. CDT
- Game weather: 67 °F (19 °C) (Partly Cloudy)
- Game attendance: 62,155
- Referee: Walt Anderson
- TV announcers (Fox): Thom Brennaman, Troy Aikman and Pam Oliver
- Recap

Game information

First quarter

- CHI – D.J. Moore 54-yard interception return (Robbie Gould kick), Bears 7–0.
- WAS – Santana Moss 24-yard pass from Donovan McNabb (Graham Gano kick), Tied 7–7, Drive: 9 plays, 72 yards, 4:55.

Second quarter

- WAS – Graham Gano 46-yard field goal, Redskins 10–7, Drive: 6 plays, 22 yards, 2:41.
- CHI – Johnny Knox 9-yard pass from Jay Cutler (Robbie Gould kick), Bears 14–10, Drive: 7 plays, 70 yards, 3:49.

Third quarter

- WAS – DeAngelo Hall 92-yard interception return (Robbie Gould kick), Redskins 17–14.

Fourth quarter

- No scoring plays

Top passers

- WAS – Donovan McNabb – 17/32, 200 yards, 1 touchdown, 2 interceptions
- CHI – Jay Cutler – 26/40, 281 yards, 1 touchdown, 4 interceptions

Top rushers

- WAS – Ryan Torain – 21 rushes, 125 yards
- CHI – Matt Forte – 10 rushes, 41 yards

Top receivers

- WAS – Santana Moss – 5 receptions, 63 yards, 1 touchdown
- CHI – Johnny Knox – 6 receptions, 86 yards, 1 touchdown

Top tacklers

- WAS – Rocky McIntosh – 6 tackles, 2 assists, 1.0 sack, 1 forced fumble
- CHI – Charles Tillman – 7 tackles, 1 assist, 2 forced fumbles

The Redskins' seventh game was an NFC duel with the Bears at Soldier Field. In the first quarter, the Redskins had problems as CB D. J. Moore returned an interception 54 yards for a touchdown. However, their offense got through after QB Donovan McNabb completed a 24-yard TD pass to WR Santana Moss. In the second quarter, they took the lead after kicker Graham Gano nailed a 46-yard field goal. The lead didn't last long after QB Jay Cutler got a 9-yard TD pass to WR Johnny Knox, but they did get the lead back in the third quarter as Cutler's pass was intercepted by DeAngelo Hall and returned 92 yards for a touchdown. Hall would have a total of 4 interceptions in this game, tying a team record.

With the win, the Redskins improve to 4–3.

=== Week 8: at Detroit Lions ===
Week 8: Washington Redskins at Detroit Lions – Game summary

Quarter	1	2	3	4	Total
Redskins	0	13	0	12	25
Lions	0	7	7	23	37

at Ford Field, Detroit, Michigan

- Date: October 31
- Game time: 1:00 pm. EDT
- Game weather: None (dome stadium)
- Game attendance: 42,329
- Referee: Jerome Boger
- TV announcers (Fox): Sam Rosen, Tim Ryan, & Charissa Thompson
- Recap

Game information

First quarter

- No scoring plays

Second quarter

- DET – Calvin Johnson 13-yard pass from Matthew Stafford (Jason Hanson kick), Lions 7–0, Drive: 3 plays, 19 yards, 0:49.
- WAS – Ryan Torain 6-yard pass from Donovan McNabb (Graham Gano kick), Tied 7–7, Drive: 3 plays, 42 yards, 1:19.
- WAS – Graham Gano 38-yard field goal, Redskins 10–7, Drive: 8 plays, 69 yards, 3:28.
- WAS – Graham Gano 46-yard field goal, Redskins 13–7, Drive: 3 plays, 21 yards, 0:16.

Third quarter

- DET – Brandon Pettigrew 2-yard pass from Matthew Stafford (Jason Hanson kick), Lions 14–13, Drive: 9 plays, 52 yards, 4:58.

Fourth quarter

- WAS – Keiland Williams 5-yard run (pass failed), Redskins 19–14, Drive: 3 plays, 46 yards, 1:20.
- DET – Calvin Johnson 7-yard pass from Matthew Stafford (pass failed), Lions 20–19, Drive: 6 plays, 47 yards, 2:54.
- WAS – Brandon Banks 96-yard kickoff return (pass failed), Redskins 25–20, Drive: 0 plays, 0 yards, 0:16.
- DET – Calvin Johnson 10-yard pass from Matthew Stafford (Matthew Stafford – Bryant Johnson pass), Lions 28–25, Drive: 7 plays, 37 yards, 1:20.
- DET – Jason Hanson 32-yard field goal, Lions 31–25, Drive: 4 plays, 6 yards, 0:20.
- DET – Ndamukong Suh 17-yard fumble return (pass failed), Lions 37–25.

Top passers

- WAS – Donovan McNabb – 17/30, 210 yards, 1 touchdown
- DET – Matthew Stafford – 26/45, 212 yards, 4 touchdowns, 1 interception

Top rushers

- WAS – Donovan McNabb – 4 rushes, 45 yards
- DET – Kevin Smith – 12 rushes, 51 yards

Top receivers

- WAS – Anthony Armstrong – 3 receptions, 92 yards
- DET – Calvin Johnson – 9 receptions, 101 yards, 3 touchdowns

Top tacklers

- WAS – Rocky McIntosh – 7 tackles, 2 assists
- DET – Kyle Vanden Bosch – 5 tackles, 1 assist, 2.0 sack, 1 forced fumble

Coming off their win over the Bears the Redskins flew to Ford Field for an NFC duel with the Lions. In the 2nd quarter the Redskins trailed early as QB Matthew Stafford got a 13-yard TD pass to WR Calvin Johnson. They pulled ahead with QB Donovan McNabb getting a 6-yard TD pass to RB Ryan Torain, followed by kicker Graham Gano making a 38 and a 46-yard field goal. The Redskins trailed slightly with Stafford getting a 2-yard TD pass to TE Brandon Pettigrew. The Redskins got the lead back with RB Keiland Williams getting a 5-yard TD run (With a failed 2-point conversion). The Lions replied with Stafford finding Johnson again on a 7-yard TD pass (With a failed 2-point conversion). After that, the Redskins took the lead again with WR Brandon Banks returning a kickoff 96 yards for a touchdown (With a failed 2-point conversion) to put the Redskins up 25–20. They soon fell behind with Stafford throwing a 10-yard TD pass to Johnson (With a successful 2-point conversion as Stafford passed to WR Bryant Johnson). This was followed by kicker Jason Hanson making a 32-yard field goal, and with DT Ndamukong Suh returning a fumble 17 yards to the endzone for a touchdown (With a failed 2-point conversion).

With the loss, the Redskins went into their bye week at 4–4.

=== Week 10: vs. Philadelphia Eagles ===
Week 10: Philadelphia Eagles at Washington Redskins – Game summary

Quarter	1	2	3	4	Total
Eagles	28	17	14	0	59
Redskins	0	14	7	7	28

at FedExField, Landover, Maryland

- Date: November 15
- Game time: 8:30 pm. EST
- Game weather: 52 °F (11 °C), cloudy/rain
- Game attendance: 84,912
- Referee: Clete Blakeman
- TV announcers (ESPN): Mike Tirico, Ron Jaworski, Jon Gruden, Michele Tafoya and Suzy Kolber
- Recap

Game information

First quarter

- PHI – DeSean Jackson 88-yard pass from Michael Vick (David Akers kick), Eagles 7–0, Drive: 1 plays, 88 yards, 0:18.
- PHI – Michael Vick 7-yard run (David Akers kick), Eagles 14–0, Drive: 5 plays, 63 yards, 2:34.
- PHI – LeSean McCoy 11-yard pass from Michael Vick (David Akers kick), Eagles 21–0, Drive: 6 plays, 37 yards, 3:50.
- PHI – Jerome Harrison 50-yard run (David Akers kick), Eagles 28–0, Drive: 3 plays, 77 yards, 1:34.

Second quarter

- PHI – Jeremy Maclin 48-yard pass from Michael Vick (David Akers kick), Eagles 35–0, Drive: 3 plays, 58 yards, 0:57.
- WAS – Darrel Young 3-yard pass from Donovan McNabb (Graham Gano kick), Eagles 35–7, Drive: 2 plays, 74 yards, 0:36.
- WAS – Keiland Williams6-yard pass from Donovan McNabb (Graham Gano kick), Eagles 35–14, Drive: 3 plays, 81 yards, 1:24.
- PHI – Michael Vick 6-yard run (David Akers kick), Eagles 42–14, Drive: 5 plays, 28 yards, 1:34.
- PHI – David Akers 48-yard field goal, Eagles 45–14, Drive: 5 plays, 33 yards, 2:15.

Third quarter

- WAS – Keiland Williams 4-yard run (Graham Gano kick), Eagles 45–21, Drive: 8 plays, 56 yards, 3:33.
- PHI – Jason Avant 3-yard pass from Michael Vick (David Akers kick), Eagles 52–21, Drive: 11 plays, 71 yards, 5:12.
- PHI – Dimitri Patterson 40-yard interception return (David Akers kick), Eagles 59–21.

Fourth quarter

- WAS – Keiland Williams 32-yard run (Graham Gano kick), Eagles 59–28, Drive: 7 plays, 84 yards, 2:48.

Top passers

- PHI – Michael Vick – 20/28, 333 yards, 4 TD
- WAS – Donovan McNabb – 17/31, 295 yards, 2 TD, 3 INT

Top rushers

- PHI – Jerome Harrison – 11 rushes, 109 yards, TD
- WAS – Keiland Williams – 16 rushes, 89 yards, 2 TD

Top receivers

- PHI – DeSean Jackson – 2 receptions, 98 yards, TD
- WAS – Anthony Armstrong – 3 receptions, 83 yards

Top tacklers

- PHI – Stewart Bradley – 3 tackles, 5 assists
- WAS – London Fletcher – 9 tackles, 4 assists

Coming off their bye week, the Redskins went home for their Week 10 NFC East rematch against the Philadelphia Eagles on Monday night. Washington immediately trailed in the first quarter as on the very first play from scrimmage, Eagles quarterback Michael Vick completed an 88-yard touchdown pass to wide receiver DeSean Jackson. Later, Philadelphia added onto their lead with Vick getting a 7-yard touchdown run, followed by Vick completing an 11-yard touchdown pass to running back LeSean McCoy and running back Jerome Harrison getting a 50-yard touchdown run. The Eagles would continue their dominating performance as Vick completed a 48-yard touchdown pass to wide receiver Jeremy Maclin. The Redskins would finally get on the board with quarterback Donovan McNabb finding linebacker Darrel Young on a 3-yard touchdown pass, followed a 3-yard touchdown pass to rookie running back Keiland Williams. Philadelphia responded with Vick getting a 6-yard touchdown run, followed by kicker David Akers getting a 48-yard field goal.

Washington began the third quarter with Williams' 4-yard touchdown run, but the Eagles continued to dictate the game as Vick completed a 3-yard touchdown pass to wide receiver Jason Avant, followed by cornerback Dimitri Patterson returning an interception 40 yards for a touchdown. The Redskins tried to rally in the fourth quarter with Williams' 32-yard touchdown run, but Philadelphia's defense (combined with the 31-point deficit) was too much to overcome.

With the loss, Washington fell to 4–5.

=== Week 11: at Tennessee Titans ===
Week 11: Washington Redskins at Tennessee Titans – Game summary

Quarter	1	2	3	4	OT	Total
Redskins	7	3	3	3	3	19
Titans	7	3	3	3	0	16

at LP Field, Nashville, Tennessee

- Date: November 21
- Game time: 12:00 pm. CST/1:00 pm. EST
- Game weather: 66 °F (19 °C) (Sunny)
- Game attendance: 69,143
- Referee: Terry McAulay
- TV announcers (Fox): Dick Stockton, Charles Davis, Jim Mora and Laura Okmin
- Recap

Game information

First quarter

- TEN – Marc Mariani 87-yard punt return (Rob Bironas kick), Titans 7–0.
- WAS – Santana Moss 5-yard pass from Donovan McNabb (Graham Gano kick), Tied 7–7, Drive: 8 plays, 79 yards, 3:16.

Second quarter

- WAS – Graham Gano 19-yard field goal, Redskins 10–7, Drive: 15 plays, 72 yards, 7:18.
- TEN – Rob Bironas 25-yard field goal, Tied 10–10, Drive: 13 plays, 73 yards, 7:07.

Third quarter

- TEN – Rob Bironas 32-yard field goal, Titans 13–10, Drive: 11 plays, 66 yards, 5:50.
- WAS – Graham Gano 40-yard field goal, Tied 13–13, Drive: 10 plays, 54 yards, 5:15.

Fourth quarter

- TEN – Rob Bironas 40-yard field goal, Titans 16–13, Drive: 7 plays, 72 yards, 3:31.
- WAS – Graham Gano 42-yard field goal, Tied 16–16, Drive: 9 plays, 50 yards, 3:16.

Overtime

- WAS – Graham Gano 38-yard field goal, Redskins 19–16, Drive: 10 plays, 57 yards, 5:09.

Top passers

- WAS – Donovan McNabb – 30/50, 376 yards, 1 touchdown, 1 interception
- TEN – Vince Young – 12/16, 165 yards

Top rushers

- WAS – Keiland Williams – 23 rushes, 68 yards
- TEN – Chris Johnson – 21 rushes, 130 yards

Top receivers

- WAS – Santana Moss – 6 receptions, 106 yards, 1 touchdown
- TEN – Nate Washington – 5 receptions, 117 yards

Top tacklers

- WAS – Reed Doughty, London Fletcher – 5 tackles, 2 assists
- TEN – Cortland Finnegan – 10 tackles, 1 assist, 1 forced fumble

Hoping to rebound from their loss to the Eagles the Redskins flew to LP Field for an inter-conference duel with the Titans. In the first quarter the Redskins had problems with a three-and-out followed by a punt being returned 87 yards for a touchdown by WR Marc Mariani. They replied with QB Donovan McNabb completing a 5-yard TD pass to WR Santana Moss, followed in the second quarter by kicker Graham Gano nailing a 19-yard field goal. They lost the lead after kicker Rob Bironas made a 25 and a 32-yard field goal. However, they replied with Gano hitting a 40-yard field goal. The Titans scored with Bironas nailing a 40-yard field goal, but the Redskins replied with Gano making a 42-yard field goal. The decision was made at Overtime after Gano successfully hit a 48-yard field goal to give the Redskins the win, settling the records for both teams at 5–5.

=== Week 12: vs. Minnesota Vikings ===
Week 12: Minnesota Vikings at Washington Redskins – Game summary

Quarter	1	2	3	4	Total
Vikings	7	0	10	0	17
Redskins	7	0	0	6	13

at FedExField, Landover, Maryland

- Date: November 28
- Game time: 1:00 pm. EST
- Game weather: 47 °F (8 °C) (Sunny)
- Game attendance: 83,602
- Referee: Ed Hochuli
- TV announcers (Fox): Dick Stockton, Charles Davis and Charissa Thompson
- Recap

Game information

First quarter

- WAS – Fred Davis 10-yard pass from Donovan McNabb (Graham Gano kick), Redskins 7–0, Drive: 13 plays, 83 yards, 7:53.
- MIN – Adrian Peterson 5-yard run (Ryan Longwell kick), Tied 7–7, Drive: 7 plays, 71 yards, 3:46.

Second quarter

- No scoring plays

Third quarter

- MIN – Toby Gerhart 5-yard run (Ryan Longwell kick), Vikings 14–7, Drive: 9 plays, 74 yards, 5:12.
- MIN – Ryan Longwell 31-yard field goal, Vikings 17–7, Drive: 4 plays, −4 yards, 1:07.

Fourth quarter

- WAS – Graham Gano 40-yard field goal, Vikings 17–10, Drive: 4 plays, 7 yards, 2:18.
- WAS – Graham Gano 42-yard field goal, Vikings 17–13, Drive: 5 plays, 46 yards, 1:43.

Top passers

- MIN – Brett Favre – 15/23, 172 yards
- WAS – Donovan McNabb – 21/35, 211 yards, 1 touchdown, 1 interception

Top rushers

- MIN – Toby Gerhart – 22 rushes, 76 yards, 1 touchdown
- WAS – James Davis – 6 rushes, 11 yards

Top receivers

- MIN – Visanthe Shiancoe – 3 receptions, 54 yards
- WAS – Anthony Armstrong – 2 receptions, 53 yards

Top tacklers

- MIN – Chad Greenway – 6 tackles, 3 assists
- WAS – Reed Doughty – 6 tackles, 3 assists

Coming off their win over the Titans the Redskins played on home ground for an NFC duel with the Vikings. In the 1st quarter the Redskins took the lead as QB Donovan McNabb completed a 10-yard TD pass to TE Fred Davis. The Vikings replied as RB Adrian Peterson got a 5-yard TD run. The Redskins trailed in the third quarter with RB Toby Gerhart getting a 5-yard TD run, followed by kicker Ryan Longwell nailing a 31-yard field goal. The Redskins tried to come back, but only came away with a 40 and a 42-yard field goal from kicker Graham Gano, giving them a loss.

With the loss, the Redskins fell to 5–6.

=== Week 13: at New York Giants ===
Week 13: Washington Redskins at New York Giants – Game summary

Quarter	1	2	3	4	Total
Redskins	0	0	7	0	7
Giants	14	7	7	3	31

at New Meadowlands Stadium, East Rutherford, New Jersey

- Date: December 5
- Game time: 1:00 pm. EST
- Game weather: 33 °F (1 °C) (Mostly Cloudy)
- Game attendance: 78,861
- Referee: Walt Coleman
- TV announcers (Fox): Kenny Albert, Daryl Johnston and Tony Siragusa
- Game Book Recap

Game information

First quarter

- NYG – Brandon Jacobs 8-yard run (Lawrence Tynes kick), Giants 7–0, Drive: 7 plays, 59 yards, 3:34.
- NYG – Ahmad Bradshaw 4-yard run (Lawrence Tynes kick), Giants 14–0, Drive: 7 plays, 59 yards, 4:01.

Second quarter

- NYG – Ahmad Bradshaw 10-yard run (Lawrence Tynes kick), Giants 21–0, Drive: 5 plays, 39 yards, 2:24.

Third quarter

- NYG – Brandon Jacobs 28-yard run (Lawrence Tynes kick), Giants 28–0, Drive: 8 plays, 42 yards, 4:26.
- WAS – Anthony Armstrong 33-yard pass from Donovan McNabb (Graham Gano kick), Giants 28–7, Drive: 4 plays, 72 yards, 2:01.

Fourth quarter

- NYG – Lawrence Tynes 28-yard field goal, Giants 31–7, Drive: 4 plays, 3 yards, 1:35.

Top passers

- WAS – Donovan McNabb – 26/44, 296 yards, 1 touchdown, 2 interceptions
- NYG – Eli Manning – 15/25, 161 yards, 1 interception

Top rushers

- WAS – James Davis – 9 rushes, 40 yards
- NYG – Brandon Jacobs – 8 rushes, 103 yards, 2 touchdowns

Top receivers

- WAS – Anthony Armstrong – 6 receptions, 97 yards, 1 touchdown
- NYG – Derek Hagan – 7 receptions, 65 yards

Top tacklers

- WAS – Reed Doughty – 7 tackles, 3 assists
- NYG – Barry Cofield – 7 tackles

Hoping to rebound from their loss to the Vikings the Redskins flew to New Meadowlands Stadium for an NFC East rivalry match against the Giants. In the first quarter the Redskins trailed early as RB Brandon Jacobs got an 8-yard TD run, followed by Ahmad Bradshaw getting a 4 and a 10-yard TD run. Then Jacobs got a 28-yard TD run to put the Giants up 28–0. They responded with QB Donovan McNabb completing a 33-yard TD pass to WR Anthony Armstrong, but they struggled further as kicker Lawrence Tynes made a 28-yard field goal.

With the loss, the Redskins fell to 5–7.

=== Week 14: vs. Tampa Bay Buccaneers ===
Week 14: Tampa Bay Buccaneers at Washington Redskins – Game summary

Quarter	1	2	3	4	Total
Buccaneers	0	3	6	8	17
Redskins	0	10	0	6	16

at FedExField, Landover, Maryland

- Date: December 12
- Game time: 1:00 pm. EST
- Game weather: 43 °F (6 °C) (Rain)
- Game attendance: 66,124
- Referee: Pete Morelli
- TV announcers (Fox): Kenny Albert, Daryl Johnston and Tony Siragusa
- Recap

Game information

First quarter

- No scoring plays

Second quarter

- WAS – Logan Paulsen 1-yard pass from Donovan McNabb (Graham Gano kick), Redskins 7–0, Drive: 8 plays, 54 yards, 4:26.
- TB – Connor Barth 25-yard field goal, Redskins 7–3, Drive: 5 plays,68 yards, 2:29.
- WAS – Graham Gano 25-yard field goal, Redskins 10–3, Drive: 6 plays, 53 yards, 2:12.

Third quarter

- TB – Connor Barth 44-yard field goal, Redskins 10–6, Drive: 4 plays, 8 yards, 3:12.
- TB – Connor Barth 35-yard field goal, Redskins 10–9, Drive: 10 plays, 44 yards, 5:29.

Fourth quarter

- TB – Kellen Winslow 41-yard pass from Josh Freeman (Josh Freeman run), Buccaneers 17–10, Drive: 7 plays, 80 yards, 3:35.
- WAS – Santana Moss 6-yard pass from Donovan McNabb (kick aborted), Buccaneers 17–16, Drive: 13 plays, 75 yards, 3:38.

Top passers

- TB – Josh Freeman – 15/25, 266 yards, 1 touchdown
- WAS – Donovan McNabb – 22/35, 228 yards, 2 touchdowns

Top rushers

- TB – LeGarrette Blount – 15 rushes, 68 yards
- WAS – Ryan Torain – 24 rushes, 172 yards

Top receivers

- TB – Arrelious Benn – 4 receptions, 122 yards
- WAS – Santana Moss – 7 receptions, 82 yards, 1 touchdown

Top tacklers

- TB – Ronde Barber – 5 tackles, 5 assists
- WAS – London Fletcher – 8 tackles, 3 assists

Hoping to break a two-game losing streak the Redskins played on home ground for an NFC duel with the Buccaneers. In the second quarter the Redskins took the lead as QB Donovan McNabb completed a 1-yard TD pass to TE Logan Paulsen. The Buccaneers replied as kicker Connor Barth nailed a 25-yard field goal, but the Redskins scored again with kicker Graham Gano making a 25-yard field goal. They fell behind with Barth making a 44 and a 35-yard field goal, followed by QB Josh Freeman completing a 41-yard TD pass to TE Kellen Winslow (With a successful 2-point conversion as Freeman ran to the endzone). The Redskins tried to cut the lead with McNabb throwing a 6-yard TD pass to WR Santana Moss, but the snap on the PAT fell through the hands of Hunter Smith in the final seconds, sealing the Redskins' fate in yet another backbreaking loss.

With the loss, not only did the Redskins guarantee that they would finish with more road wins than home wins for the first time since the 1994 season, but more importantly, they fell to 5–8, and were officially eliminated from postseason contention, with the Eagles' 30–27 win over the Cowboys.

=== Week 15: at Dallas Cowboys ===
Week 15: Washington Redskins at Dallas Cowboys – Game summary

Quarter	1	2	3	4	Total
Redskins	0	7	7	16	30
Cowboys	10	10	10	3	33

at Cowboys Stadium, Arlington, Texas

- Game time: 1:00 pm EST (12:00 pm CST)
- Game weather: None (Dome open)
- Game attendance: 86,904
- Referee: Alberto Riveron
- TV announcers (Fox): Kenny Albert, Daryl Johnston and Tony Siragusa
- Recap

Game information

First quarter

- DAL – David Buehler 42-yard field goal, Cowboys 3–0, Drive: 8 plays, 30 yards, 4:14.
- DAL – Miles Austin 3-yard pass from Jon Kitna (David Buehler kick), Cowboys 10–0, Drive: 4 plays, 27 yards, 1:34.

Second quarter

- DAL – David Buehler 20-yard field goal, Cowboys 13–0, Drive: 9 plays, 33 yards, 4:27.
- WAS – Ryan Torain 19-yard pass from Rex Grossman (Graham Gano kick), Cowboys 13–7, Drive: 8 plays, 78 yards, 3:15.
- DAL – Jason Witten 14-yard pass from Jon Kitna (David Buehler kick), Cowboys 20–7, Drive: 9 plays, 91 yards, 5:51.

Third quarter

- DAL – Tashard Choice 3-yard run (David Buehler kick), Cowboys 27–7, Drive: 5 plays, 15 yards, 2:04.
- WAS – Santana Moss 10-yard pass from Rex Grossman (Graham Gano kick), Cowboys 27–14, Drive: 4 plays, 71 yards, 2:17.
- DAL – David Buehler 20-yard field goal, Cowboys 30–14, Drive: 10 plays, 80 yards, 5:23.

Fourth quarter

- WAS – Santana Moss 5-yard pass from Rex Grossman (Rex Grossman – Chris Cooley pass), Cowboys 30–22, Drive: 14 plays, 78 yards, 5:42.
- WAS – Chris Cooley 5-yard pass from Rex Grossman (Rex Grossman – Mike Sellers pass), Tied 30–30, Drive: 8 plays, 56 yards, 4:03.
- DAL – David Buehler 39-yard field goal, Cowboys 33–30, Drive: 7 plays, 31 yards, 2:21.

Top passers

- WAS – Rex Grossman – 25/43, 322 yards, 4 touchdowns, 2 interceptions
- DAL – Jon Kitna – 25/37, 305 yards, 2 touchdowns

Top rushers

- WAS – Ryan Torain – 11 rushes, 53 yards
- DAL – Felix Jones – 12 rushes, 70 yards

Top receivers

- WAS – Anthony Armstrong – 5 receptions, 100 yards
- DAL – Jason Witten – 10 receptions, 140 yards, 1 touchdown

Top tacklers

- WAS – London Fletcher – 7 tackles, 4 assists
- DAL – DeMarcus Ware – 6 tackles, 2 sacks, 1 forced fumble

The Redskins' fourteenth game was an NFC East rivalry rematch against the Cowboys at Cowboys Stadium. In the first quarter the Redskins trailed early with kicker David Buehler hitting a 42-yard field goal, followed by QB Jon Kitna throwing a 3-yard TD pass to WR Miles Austin; then Buehler made a 20-yard field goal to put Dallas up 13–0. The lead was narrowed when QB Rex Grossman completed a 19-yard TD pass to RB Ryan Torain, but fell further behind with Kitna making a 14-yard TD pass to TE Jason Witten, followed by RB Tashard Choice getting a 3-yard TD run. The Redskins replied with Grossman getting a 10-yard TD pass to WR Santana Moss, but the Cowboys scored again when Buehler got a 20-yard field goal. Washington managed to tie the game with Grossman finding Moss and Cooley on a 5-yard TD pass (With two successful 2-point conversions as Grossman passed to Cooley and Sellers). The Redskins couldn't get any further after Buehler made a 39-yard field goal, settling both records at 5–9.

=== Week 16: at Jacksonville Jaguars ===
Week 16: Washington Redskins at Jacksonville Jaguars – Game summary

Quarter	1	2	3	4	OT	Total
Redskins	10	0	0	7	3	20
Jaguars	0	7	3	7	0	17

at EverBank Field, Jacksonville, Florida

- Date: December 26
- Game time: 1:00 pm. EST
- Game weather: 38 °F (3 °C) (Cloudy)
- Game attendance: 63,470
- Referee: Jerome Boger
- TV announcers (Fox): Sam Rosen and Tim Ryan
- Recap

Game information

First quarter

- WAS – Graham Gano 48-yard field goal, Redskins 3–0, Drive: 5 plays, 14 yards, 1:19.
- WAS – Fred Davis 1-yard pass from Rex Grossman (Graham Gano kick), Redskins 10–0, Drive: 5 plays, 18 yards, 2:24.

Second quarter

- JAC – Mike Thomas 19-yard pass from David Garrard (Josh Scobee kick), Redskins 10–7, Drive: 10 plays, 79 yards, 5:55.

Third quarter

- JAC – Josh Scobee 34-yard field goal, Tied 10–10, Drive: 8 plays, 62 yards, 3:53.

Fourth quarter

- WAS – Ryan Torain 1-yard run (Graham Gano kick), Redskins 17–10, Drive: 14 plays, 68 yards, 7:50.
- JAC – David Garrard 20-yard run (Josh Scobee kick), Tied 17–17, Drive: 4 plays, 42 yards, 1:16.

Overtime

- WAS – Graham Gano 31-yard field goal, Redskins 20–17, Drive: 3 plays, 1 yards, 1:12.

Top passers

- WAS – Rex Grossman – 19/39, 182 yards, 1 touchdown, 1 interception
- JAC – David Garrard – 22/38, 299 yards, 1 touchdown, 2 interceptions

Top rushers

- WAS – Ryan Torain – 20 rushes, 65 yards, 1 touchdown
- JAC – David Garrard – 6 rushes, 39 yards, 1 touchdown

Top receivers

- WAS – Santana Moss – 5 receptions, 85 yards
- JAC – Mike Thomas – 6 receptions, 96 yards, 1 touchdown

Top tacklers

- WAS – Rocky McIntosh – 7 tackles
- JAC – Daryl Smith – 9 tackles

The Redskins' fifteenth game was an interconference duel with the Jaguars. In the first quarter the Redskins took the lead as kicker Graham Gano hit a 48-yard field goal, followed by QB Rex Grossman throwing a 1-yard TD pass to TE Fred Davis. The Jaguars tied the game with QB David Garrard getting a 19-yard TD pass to Mike Thomas, followed by kicker Josh Scobee nailing a 34-yard field goal. the Redskins got the lead back in the fourth quarter with RB Ryan Torain getting a 1-yard TD run, but the Jaguars replied with Garrard scrambling 20 yards for a touchdown. The decision was made in overtime when Gano successfully hit a 31-yard field goal to give Washington the win, bringing their record up to 6–9.

=== Week 17: vs. New York Giants ===
Week 17: New York Giants at Washington Redskins – Game summary

Quarter	1	2	3	4	Total
Giants	3	7	7	0	17
Redskins	0	7	0	7	14

at FedExField, Landover, Maryland

- Date: January 2
- Game time: 4:15 pm. EST
- Game attendance: 76,189
- Referee: Scott Green
- TV announcers (Fox): Sam Rosen and Tim Ryan
- Recap

Game information

First quarter

- NYG – Lawrence Tynes 20-yard field goal, Giants 3–0, Drive: 11 plays, 78 yards, 5:58

Second quarter

- NYG – Brandon Jacobs 2-yard run (Lawrence Tynes kick), Giants 10–0, Drive: 9 plays, 69 yards, 4:54
- WAS – Fred Davis 1-yard pass from Rex Grossman (Graham Gano kick), Giants 10–7, Drive: 7 plays, 80 yards, 2:44

Third quarter

- NYG – Mario Manningham 92-yard pass from Eli Manning (Lawrence Tynes kick), Giants 17–7, Drive: 2 plays, 95 yards, 0:57

Fourth quarter

- WAS – Anthony Armstrong 64-yard pass from Rex Grossman (Graham Gano Kick), Giants 17–14, Drive: 1 play, 64 yards, 0:10

Top passers

- NYG – Eli Manning 17/29, 243 yards, 1 touchdown, 1 interception
- WAS – Rex Grossman 26/44, 336 yards, 2 touchdowns, 1 interception

Top rushers

- NYG – Brandon Jacobs 13 rushes, 49 yards, 1 touchdown
- WAS – Ryan Torain 18 rushes, 61 yards

Top receivers

- NYG – Mario Manningham 4 receptions, 101 yards, 1 touchdown
- WAS – Anthony Armstrong 2 receptions, 84 yards, 1 touchdown

Top tacklers

- NYG – Terrell Thomas 7 tackles, 3 assists
- WAS – Phillip Buchanon 4 tackles, 1 assist, 1 interception

The Redskins entered Week 17 as a spoiler in the New York Giants' run for the playoffs. In a game full of turnovers, New York gained the early upper hand with a 20-yard field goal from Lawrence Tynes. In the second quarter, the Giants added 7 more points to their score after a 2-yard run from Brandon Jacobs. Washington would put their first points on the board with a 1-yard pass from Rex Grossman to Fred Davis to conclude the scoring for the first half. The Giants went up by another seven points upon Mario Manningham's 92-yard reception from Eli Manning. The Redskins would answer with a 64-yard pass from Grossman to Anthony Armstrong, leaving the differential of the score to a field goal. In Washington's final possession, Grossman would lead the team to a turn over on downs; with no timeouts, the New York Giants would win the game (although due to Green Bay's superior head-to-head tiebreaker advantage, unable to qualify for the playoffs) and the Redskins would end their season by falling to 6–10 but surpassing their previous season's record of 4–12.

== Statistics ==
=== Passing ===
Player	G	QB Rat.	Comp.	Att.	Pct.	Yards	TD	INT	Long	Sack
Donovan McNabb	7	76.0	275	472	58.3	3,377	14	15	62	37

=== Rushing ===
Player	G	Att.	Yards	Y/G	Avg.	Long	TD	Fum	FumL
Ryan Torain	5	82	381	76.2	4.6	36	3	0	0
Clinton Portis	4	49	195	48.8	4.0	27	2	0	0
Donovan McNabb	7	19	90	12.9	4.7	26	0	1	0
Keiland Williams	6	4	13	2.2	3.3	14	0	0	0
Larry Johnson	2	5	2	1.0	0.4	7	0	0	0
Mike Sellers	7	2	1	0.2	0.5	1	0	0	0
Josh Bidwell	3	1	0	0.0	0.0	0	0	1	0
Santana Moss	7	3	−5	−0.7	−1.7	5	0	0	0

=== Receiving ===
Player	G	Rec.	Tar.	Yards	Y/G	Avg.	Long	TD
Santana Moss	16	93	63	1,115	78.3	12.0	56	2
Chris Cooley	7	35	54	392	56.0	11.2	35	2
Anthony Armstrong	6	14	28	276	46.0	19.7	57	1
Joey Galloway	7	8	24	139	19.9	17.4	62	0
Fred Davis	7	8	11	124	17.7	15.5	62	0
Mike Sellers	7	12	22	109	15.6	9.1	22	0
Keiland Williams	5	11	14	57	11.4	5.2	9	1
Roydell Williams	7	2	5	44	6.3	22.0	34	0
Clinton Portis	4	4	7	41	10.3	10.3	14	0
Ryan Torain	5	5	11	36	7.2	7.2	11	0
Brandon Banks	5	1	2	−5	−1.3	−5.0	−5	0

=== Kicking ===
Player	G	0–19	20–29	30–39	40–49	50+	FGM	FGA	Pct.	Long	XPM	XPA
Graham Gano	7	0–0	7–8	2–3	4–5	0–2	13	18	72.2	49	13	13

=== Punting ===
Player	G	Punt	Yards	Avg.	In20	In10	TB	Long
Hunter Smith	3	21	867	41.3	9	0	1	56
Josh Bidwell	4	15	625	41.7	3	1	0	52
Graham Gano	6	4	141	35.3	1	0	0	42

=== Defense ===
Player	G	Solo TK	Asst. TK	Total TK	Sack	YdL	INT	Yards	ForFum	FumRec	TD
LaRon Landry	7	53	15	68	1.0	8	1	0	1	1	0
London Fletcher	7	43	25	68	2.0	13	0	0	1	0	0
DeAngelo Hall	7	37	20	57	0.0	0	6	92	1	1	2
Rocky McIntosh	6	34	20	54	2.0	11	0	0	0	0	0
Reed Doughty	7	21	18	42	0.0	0	0	0	2	0	0
Carlos Rogers	7	29	6	35	0.0	0	1	5	1	0	0
Brian Orakpo	7	17	6	23	7.0	35	0	0	2	0	0
Kareem Moore	5	12	11	23	0.0	0	1	5	0	2	0
Lorenzo Alexander	7	11	8	19	2.0	11	0	0	2	1	0
Andre Carter	7	9	10	19	1.0	7	0	0	1	1	0
Phillip Buchanon	7	15	3	18	0.0	0	0	0	0	0	0
Adam Carriker	7	8	7	15	1.0	2	0	0	0	0	0
Kedric Golston	7	7	6	13	0.0	0	0	0	0	0	0
Maake Kemoeatu	7	10	3	13	0.0	0	0	0	0	0	0
Vonnie Holliday	5	3	8	11	1.0	2	0	0	0	0	0
Mike Sellers	7	9	0	9	0.0	0	0	0	0	0	0
Chris Wilson	7	6	3	9	0.0	0	0	0	3	0	0
Chris Horton	6	6	3	9	0.0	0	0	0	3	0	0
Albert Haynesworth	4	7	2	9	1.0	10	0	0	0	0	0
H.B. Blades	7	2	4	6	0.0	0	0	0	0	0	0
Phillip Daniels	6	5	0	5	1.0	2	0	0	0	0	0
Byron Westbrook	6	4	0	4	0.0	0	0	0	0	1	0
Anthony Armstrong	5	2	2	4	0.0	0	0	0	0	0	0
Roydell Williams	6	2	1	3	0.0	0	0	0	0	0	0
Fred Davis	6	1	1	2	0.0	0	0	0	0	0	0
Darrel Young	6	2	0	2	0.0	0	0	0	0	0	0
Jeremy Jarmon	2	1	1	2	0.0	0	0	0	0	0	0
Donovan McNabb	6	1	0	1	0.0	0	50	0	0	1	0
Santana Moss	6	1	0	1	0.0	0	0	0	0	0	0
Artis Hicks	6	1	0	1	0.0	0	0	0	0	0	0
Ryan Torain	4	1	0	1	0.0	0	0	0	0	0	0
Chad Simpson	3	1	0	1	0.0	0	0	0	0	0	0
Nick Sundberg	6	1	0	1	0.0	0	0	0	0	0	0
Trent Williams	4	1	0	1	0.0	0	0	0	0	0	0
Perry Riley	2	1	0	1	0.0	0	0	0	0	0	0
Keiland Williams	5	1	0	1	0.0	0	0	0	0	0	0
