= Chris Wilson (gridiron football) =

American football player (born 1982)

No. 95, 51
- Position: Defensive end

Personal information
- Born: July 10, 1982 (age 44); Flint, Michigan, U.S.
- Listed height: 6 ft 4 in (1.93 m)
- Listed weight: 243 lb (110 kg)

Career information
- High school: Flint Northern
- College: Northwood
- NFL draft: 2005: undrafted

Career history
- BC Lions (2005–2006); Washington Redskins (2007–2010); Philadelphia Eagles (2011)*; Washington Redskins (2012); BC Lions (2013); Montreal Alouettes (2014)
- * Offseason or practice squad member only

Awards and highlights
- Grey Cup champion (2006)

Career NFL statistics
- Total tackles: 75
- Sacks: 6.5
- Forced fumbles: 2
- Stats at Pro Football Reference
- Stats at CFL.ca (archive)

Chris Wilson (born July 10, 1982) is an American former professional football player who was a defensive end in the National Football League (NFL) and Canadian Football League (CFL). He began his career in the CFL with the BC Lions after signing as an undrafted free agent in 2005. He spent five seasons in the NFL with the Washington Redskins and Philadelphia Eagles before re-signing with the Lions. He played college football for the Northwood Timberwolves. He is a member of Iota Phi Theta fraternity.

== Professional career ==
=== BC Lions ===
Wilson signed with the BC Lions in 2005 and was part of the BC Lions' defensive line in their 2006 Grey Cup victory.

=== Washington Redskins ===
On January 3, 2007, Wilson signed with the Washington Redskins for a reported three-year contract. In the 2007 season, his rookie season in the NFL, he finished with 13 tackles and four sacks.

Wilson recorded 20 tackles and one sack in the 2009 season.

Initially, Wilson played as a defensive end for the Redskins, but transitioned to outside linebacker when the team switched to a 3-4 defense in the 2010 season.

=== Philadelphia Eagles ===
The Philadelphia Eagles signed Wilson on August 8, 2011. He was released during final cuts on September 2, 2011.

=== Second stint with Redskins ===
On April 24, 2012, Wilson signed a one-year contract with Washington Redskins and competed with Markus White and Rob Jackson for one of the backup roles at outside linebacker. After performing well in the preseason games, he made the final 53-man roster by the start of the 2012 season.

=== Return to BC Lions ===
On September 9, 2013, the BC Lions announced that Wilson had re-signed with the team.

=== Coaching ===
Wilson interned as a special teams and linebackers coach for the Pittsburgh Steelers during the 2017 NFL training camp. He served as the head football coach of the Flint Jaguars, the remaining high school team in the Flint, Michigan community. Wilson also served as the defensive coordinator and special teams coordinator for Vermilion Community College.

Wilson is currently serving as director and head football coach for 475 Elite Training's Youth Football Club.

Wilson also serves as a youth pastor at Church of the Harvest International.
