= Keiland Williams =

American football player (born 1986)

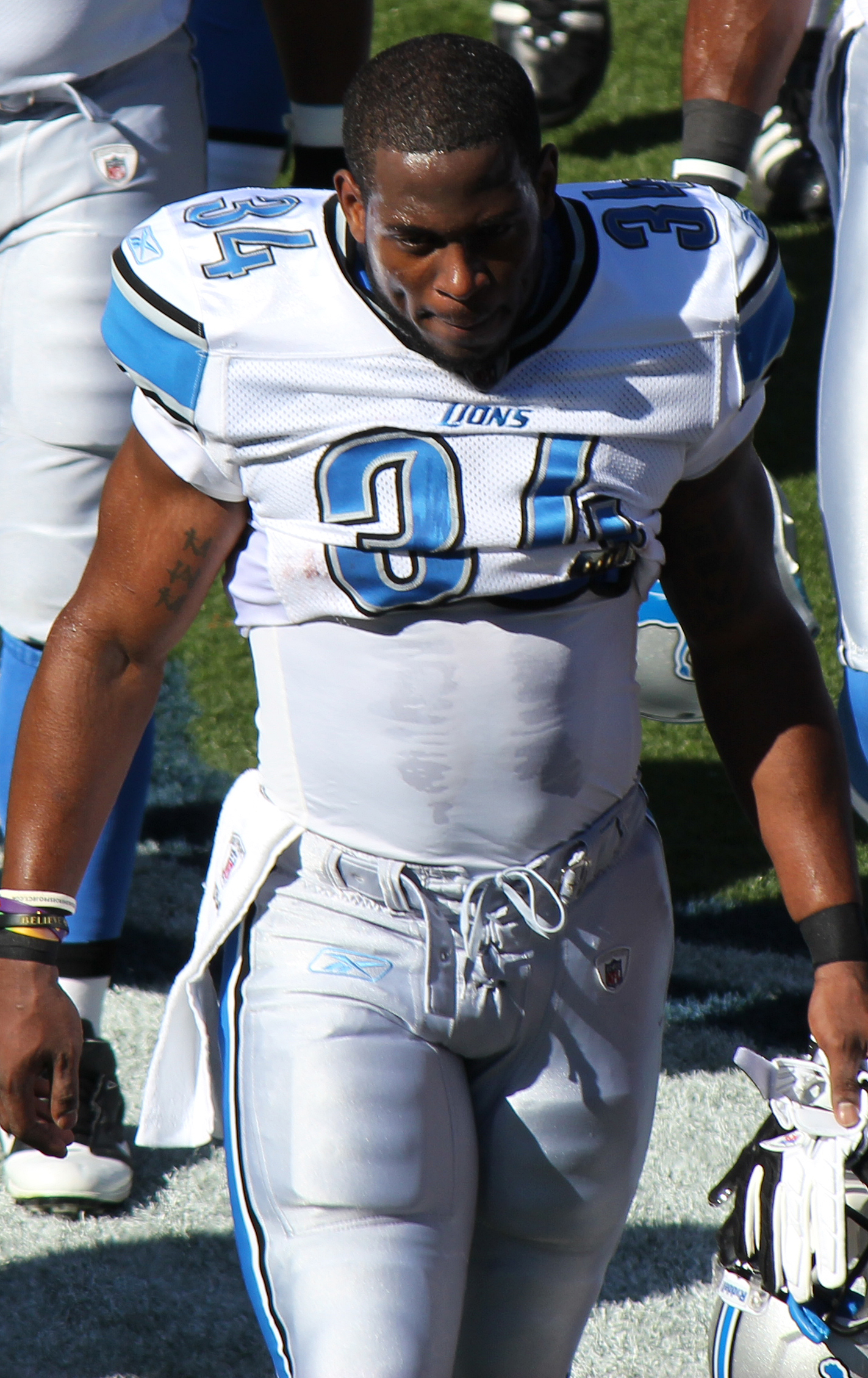
- Williams with the Detroit Lions in 2011

No. 35, 34, 25
- Position: Running back

Personal information
- Born: August 14, 1986 (age 40); Lafayette, Louisiana, U.S.
- Listed height: 5 ft 11 in (1.80 m)
- Listed weight: 230 lb (104 kg)

Career information
- High school: Northside (Lafayette)
- College: LSU
- NFL draft: 2010: undrafted

Career history
- Washington Redskins (2010); Detroit Lions (2011–2012); Washington Redskins (2012)

Awards and highlights
- BCS national champion (2008)

Career NFL statistics
- Rushing attempts: 125
- Rushing yards: 459
- Rushing touchdowns: 5
- Receptions: 49
- Receiving yards: 380
- Receiving touchdowns: 2
- Stats at Pro Football Reference

Keiland Terrell Williams (born August 14, 1986) is an American former professional football player who was a running back in the National Football League (NFL). He was signed by the Redskins as an undrafted free agent in 2010. He played college football for the LSU Tigers.

He also played for the Detroit Lions.

== Early life ==
Williams began his prep career at Broussard Middle School in Broussard, Louisiana, then began his high school career at Northside High School in Lafayette, Louisiana, where he rushed for more than 2,500 yards and 30 touchdowns in his junior season. Williams was the Number three running back in the nation and number one in the state. He completed his eligibility at Hargrave Military Academy in Chatham, Virginia, where he became the first running back in school history to rush for more than 1,000 yards a season, finishing with 160 carries for 1,325 yards and 12 touchdowns. He was teammates with Vidal Hazelton, Jerrell Powe, and John Jerry.

Williams was a highly sought recruit. After verbally committing to Louisiana State in January 2006 but refusing to sign on National Signing Day, Williams finally signed his letter of intent to LSU on February 10, 2006.

== College career ==
Playing as a true freshman in 2006 for LSU, Williams rushed for a total of 436 yards on carries and 5 touchdowns. At the 2007 Sugar Bowl versus Notre Dame Williams rushed for 107 yards on 14 attempts, scoring 2 touchdowns. Over the course of his career at LSU, Williams rushed for 1,699 yards on 299 carries and scored 17 rushing touchdowns. He also had 28 receptions for 273 yards and 2 touchdowns.

== Professional career ==
Pre-draft measurables
Height	Weight	Arm length	Hand span	40-yard dash	10-yard split	20-yard split	Vertical jump	Bench press
5 ft 10 7/8 in (1.80 m)	233 lb (106 kg)	30 in (0.76 m)	8 3/4 in (0.22 m)	4.52 s	1.51 s	2.64 s	33.0 in (0.84 m)	16 reps
All values from NFL Combine/Pro Day

=== Washington Redskins (first stint) ===
Williams was signed by the Washington Redskins as an undrafted free agent following the 2010 NFL draft. Although he had no carries in the regular season, Williams was activated for the week 5 game against the Green Bay Packers to back up Ryan Torain, who started for the injured Clinton Portis. He had career highs with 89 yards rushing and two scores and 50 yards receiving and one touchdown in a 59–28 loss to Philadelphia.

He was waived on September 3, 2011.

=== Detroit Lions ===
The Detroit Lions claimed Williams off of waivers on September 4, 2011.

The Lions released him on October 18, 2012.

=== Washington Redskins (second stint) ===
The Washington Redskins signed Williams after they cut Ryan Grant on October 23, 2012.

The Redskins waived him on August 31, 2013, for final roster cuts before the start of 2013 season.
