= Phillip Daniels =

American gridiron football player and coach (born 1973)

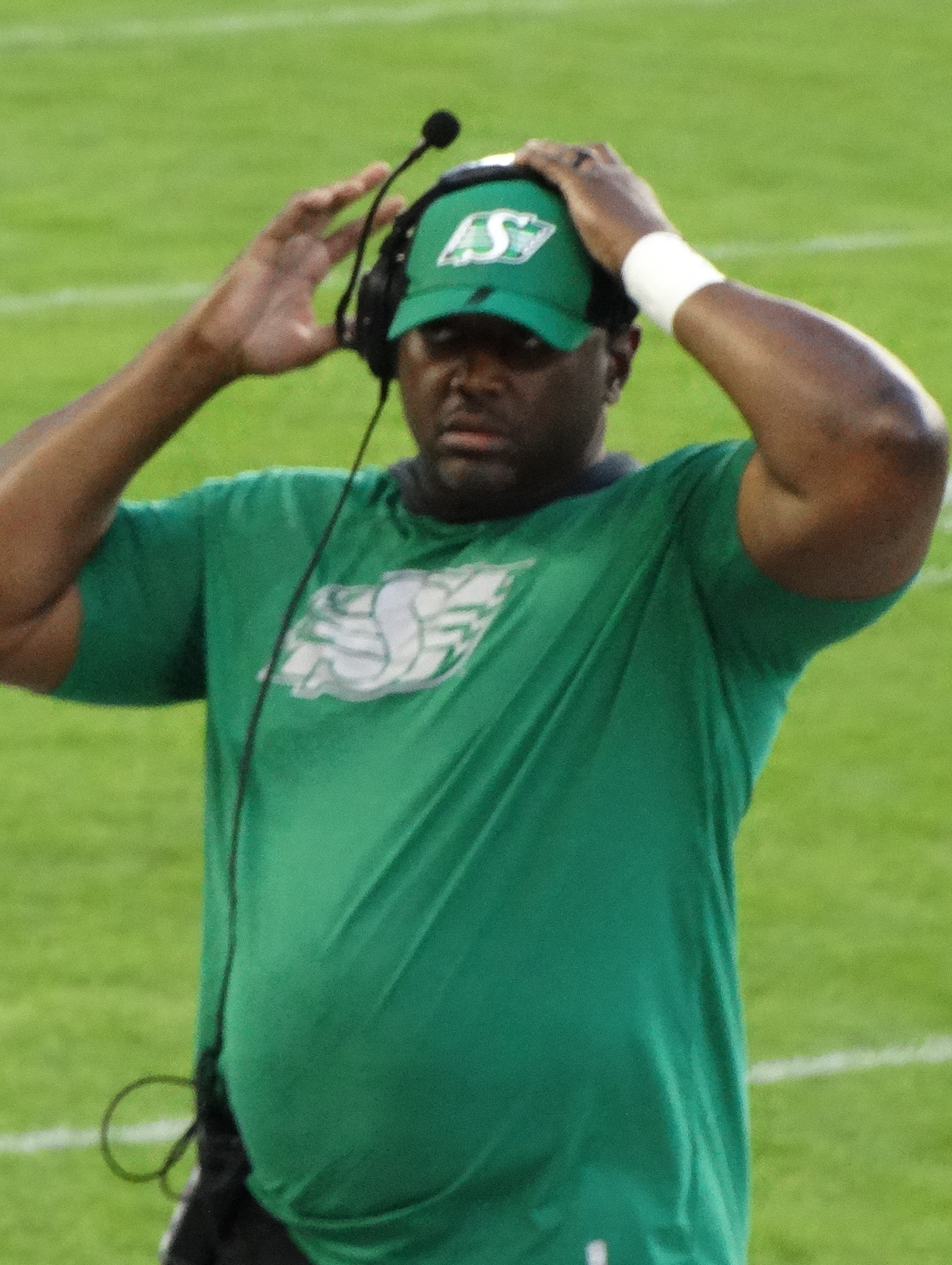
- Daniels with the Saskatchewan Roughriders in 2024

Ottawa Redblacks
- Title: Defensive line coach

Personal information
- Born: March 4, 1973 (age 53); Donalsonville, Georgia, U.S.
- Listed height: 6 ft 5 in (1.96 m)
- Listed weight: 302 lb (137 kg)

Career information
- High school: Seminole County (Donalsonville)
- College: Georgia
- NFL draft: 1996: 4th round, 99th overall pick

Career history

Playing
- Seattle Seahawks (1996–1999); Chicago Bears (2000–2003); Washington Redskins (2004–2010)

Coaching
- Philadelphia Eagles (2016−2018) Assistant defensive line coach; Philadelphia Eagles (2019) Defensive line coach; Houston Gamblers (2023) Defensive line coach; Saskatchewan Roughriders (2024–2025) Defensive line coach; Ottawa Redblacks (2026–present) Defensive line coach

Operations
- Washington Redskins (2012) Director of player development

Awards and highlights
- As coach: Super Bowl champion (LII); Grey Cup champion (2025); As player: Second-team All-SEC (1995)

Career NFL statistics
- Total tackles: 516
- Sacks: 62.0
- Forced fumbles: 14
- Fumble recoveries: 12
- Interceptions: 1
- Stats at Pro Football Reference

Phillip Bernard Daniels (born March 4, 1973) is an American football coach who is the defensive line coach for the Ottawa Redblacks of the Canadian Football League (CFL). Hs is also a former American football defensive end who played for 15 seasons in the National Football League (NFL). He was drafted by the Seattle Seahawks in the fourth round of the 1996 NFL draft. He played college football at the University of Georgia.

Daniels has also played for the Chicago Bears and Washington Redskins.

== Early life ==
Daniels attended Seminole County High School (Donalsonville, GA) and lettered in football, basketball, and baseball.

== College career ==
Daniels attended and played college football at the University of Georgia. While there he played three different positions. As a sophomore, he played defensive tackle, linebacker as a junior, and finally defensive end as a senior and served as team captain.

== Professional career ==
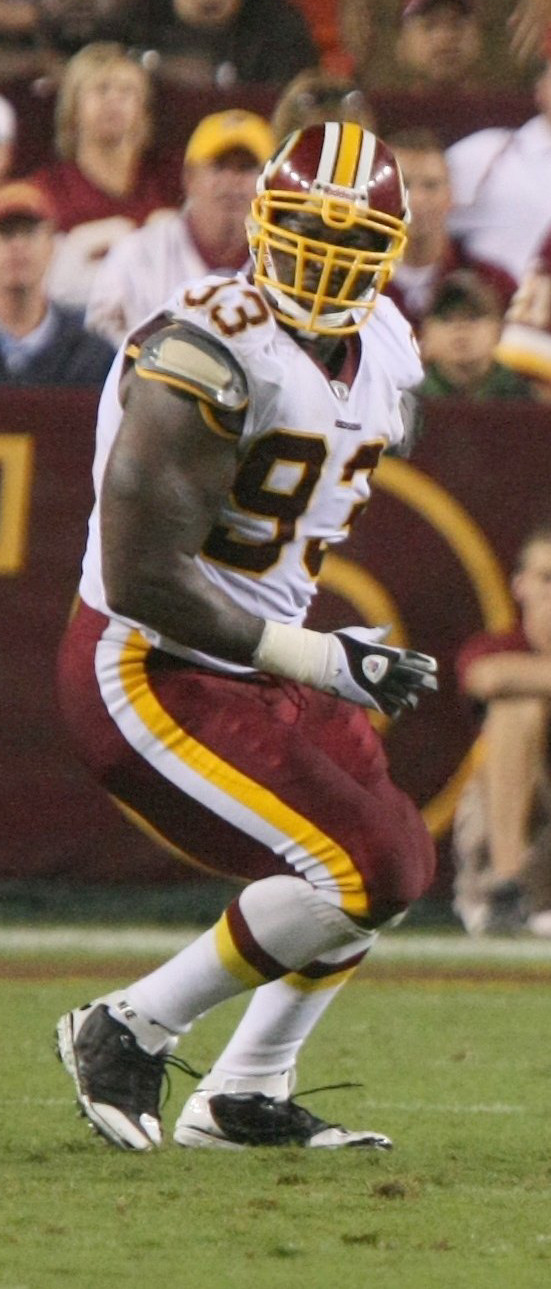
Daniels playing for the Redskins in the 2009 preseason.

Pre-draft measurables
Height	Weight	Arm length	Hand span	40-yard dash	10-yard split	20-yard split	20-yard shuttle	Vertical jump	Broad jump	Bench press
6 ft 4 7/8 in (1.95 m)	263 lb (119 kg)	34 1/8 in (0.87 m)	9 1/2 in (0.24 m)	4.86 s	1.69 s	2.85 s	4.37 s	36.5 in (0.93 m)	10 ft 4 in (3.15 m)	20 reps

=== Seattle Seahawks ===
Daniels was drafted by the Seattle Seahawks in the fourth round of the 1996 NFL draft with the 99th overall pick. He played for the team from 1996 to 1999.

=== Chicago Bears ===
Daniels signed with the Chicago Bears before the 2000 season and played for them until 2003.

=== Washington Redskins ===
Daniels signed with the Washington Redskins as an unrestricted free agent in 2004. On December 18, 2005, he had career high four sacks and also recovered a fumble in a 35–7 win over the Dallas Cowboys and was named the NFC defensive player of the week.

Daniels was released by the Redskins on July 28, 2011. Head coach Mike Shanahan said that he saw Daniels as a coach or in a front office somewhere because of the way he prepare and handles himself and Daniels was hired the following year as the Washington Redskins Director of Player Development.

== NFL career statistics ==
Legend
	Led the league
**Bold**	Career high

=== Regular season ===
Year	Team	Games		Tackles				Interceptions				Fumbles			
Year	Team	GP	GS	Comb	Solo	Ast	Sck	Int	Yds	TD	Lng	FF	FR	Yds	TD
1996	SEA	15	0	11	9	2	2.0	0	0	0	0	0	1	0	0
1997	SEA	13	10	34	24	10	4.0	0	0	0	0	1	0	0	0
1998	SEA	16	15	48	34	**14**	6.5	0	0	0	0	**3**	**2**	0	0
1999	SEA	16	16	47	39	8	**9.0**	0	0	0	0	1	0	0	0
2000	CHI	14	14	42	37	5	6.0	0	0	0	0	0	1	0	0
2001	CHI	16	16	51	**44**	7	**9.0**	0	0	0	0	**3**	**2**	0	0
2002	CHI	13	13	46	36	10	5.5	0	0	0	0	0	1	0	0
2003	CHI	16	16	**53**	41	12	2.5	0	0	0	0	1	0	0	0
2004	WAS	5	5	4	4	0	1.0	0	0	0	0	0	1	0	0
2005	WAS	16	16	48	37	11	8.0	0	0	0	0	1	**2**	0	0
2006	WAS	16	15	37	24	13	3.0	**1**	0	0	0	1	0	0	0
2007	WAS	15	15	39	25	**14**	2.5	0	0	0	0	**3**	**2**	0	0
2009	WAS	16	15	35	24	11	1.0	0	0	0	0	0	0	0	0
2010	WAS	14	1	21	15	6	2.0	0	0	0	0	0	0	0	0
		201	167	516	393	123	62.0	1	0	0	0	14	12	0	0

=== Playoffs ===
Year	Team	Games		Tackles				Interceptions				Fumbles			
Year	Team	GP	GS	Comb	Solo	Ast	Sck	Int	Yds	TD	Lng	FF	FR	Yds	TD
1999	SEA	1	1	5	4	1	0.0	0	0	0	0	0	0	0	0
2001	CHI	1	1	4	4	0	0.0	0	0	0	0	0	0	0	0
2005	WAS	2	2	**8**	**5**	**3**	**1.0**	0	0	0	0	**1**	0	0	0
2007	WAS	1	1	1	0	1	0.0	0	0	0	0	0	0	0	0
		5	5	18	13	5	1.0	0	0	0	0	1	0	0	0

== Post-playing career ==
On February 17, 2012, Daniels was hired as the director of player development of the Washington Redskins.

Daniels coached the defensive line in the 1st Annual NFLPA All-Star game. He was hired by the Philadelphia Eagles as Assistant Defensive Line Coach on January 20, 2016. Daniels won his first Super Bowl ring when the Eagles defeated the New England Patriots in Super Bowl LII.

On February 8, 2019, Daniels was promoted internally to become the Eagles' defensive line coach, replacing Chris Wilson, whose contract had expired. On January 17, 2020, it was reported that Daniels would not return to the Eagles' coaching staff in 2020 which was surprise move after having the best unit on the team finishing 3rd vs the run and 11 in sacks with a slew of injuries at the DT position.

On January 15, 2024, it was announced that Daniels had been named the defensive line coach for the Saskatchewan Roughriders.

It was announced on January 8, 2026, that Daniels had joined the Ottawa Redblacks to serve as their defensive line coach.

== Personal life ==
Daniels and his wife, Leslie, have four children; two sons, DaVaris and DaKendrick, and two daughters, Damara and DaKiya. His son, DaVaris, played college football as a wide receiver for the University of Notre Dame and plays professionally for the Toronto Argonauts. Furthermore, he is the uncle of T. J. Jones, a former wide receiver at the University of Notre Dame, who was drafted in the sixth round of the 2014 NFL draft by the Detroit Lions. Phillip Daniels is a member of Phi Beta Sigma fraternity, having joined while at the University of Georgia.
