= Darrel Young =

American football player (born 1987)

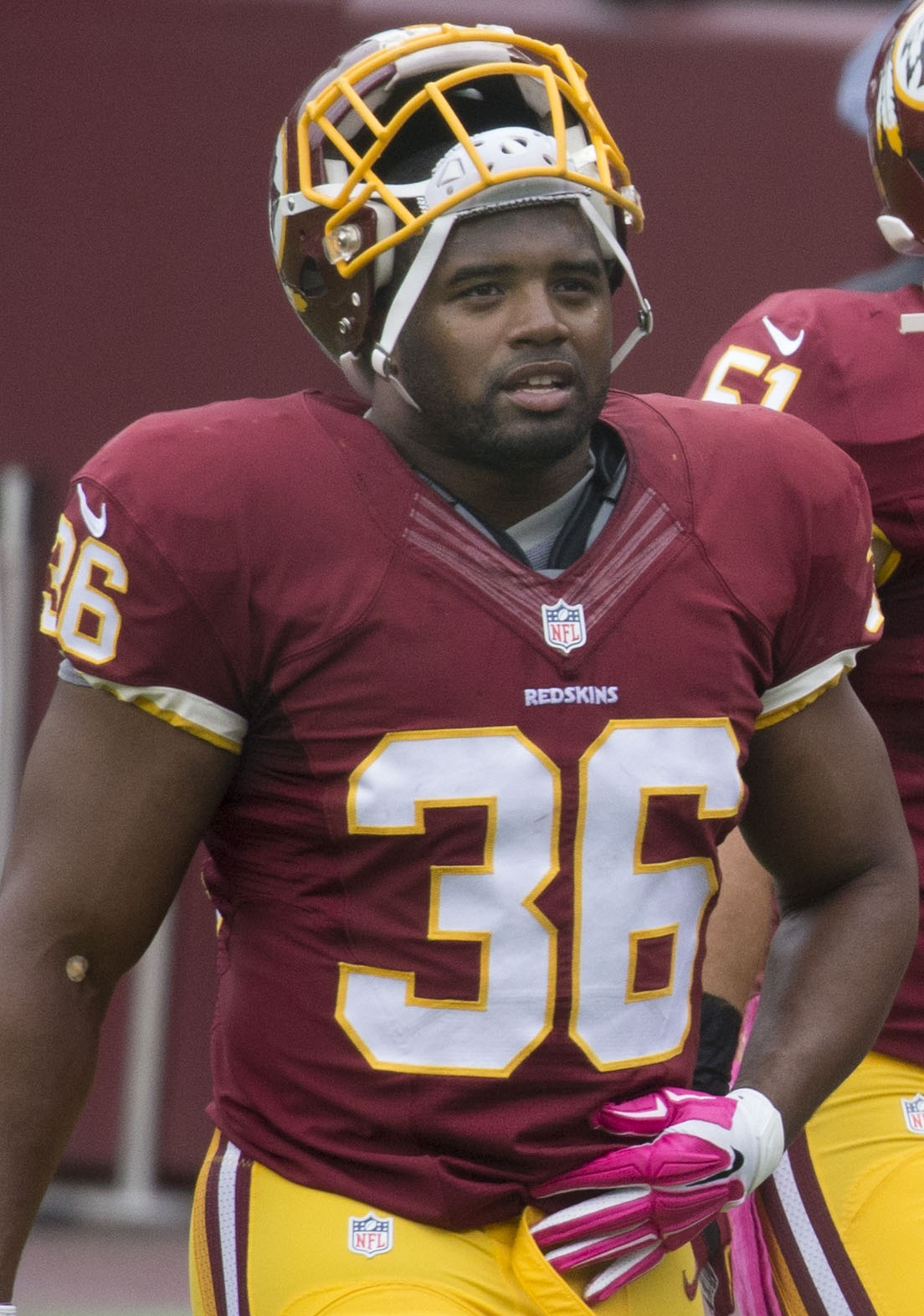
- Young with the Washington Redskins in 2015

Pittsburgh Steelers
- Title: Director of player development

Personal information
- Born: April 8, 1987 (age 39); North Amityville, New York, U.S.
- Listed height: 5 ft 11 in (1.80 m)
- Listed weight: 251 lb (114 kg)

Career information
- Position: Fullback (No. 36)
- High school: Amityville Memorial (Amityville, New York)
- College: Villanova
- NFL draft: 2009: undrafted

Career history

Playing
- Washington Redskins (2009)*; Washington Redskins (2010–2015); Chicago Bears (2016)*; Carolina Panthers (2017)*
- * Offseason or practice squad member only

Operations
- Pittsburgh Steelers (2021–present) Director of player development

Career NFL statistics
- Rushing attempts: 51
- Rushing yards: 185
- Rushing touchdowns: 7
- Receptions: 45
- Receiving yards: 432
- Receiving touchdowns: 6
- Stats at Pro Football Reference

Darrel Young (born April 8, 1987) is an American professional football executive and former player who is the director of player development for the Pittsburgh Steelers of the National Football League (NFL). He was signed by the Washington Redskins as an undrafted free agent as a linebacker prospect in 2009. He played college football for the Villanova Wildcats.

== Early life ==
Young attended and played high school football at Amityville Memorial High School.

== College career ==
Young attended and played college football at Villanova University from 2005 to 2007. In the 2005 season, he had 13 tackles, three sacks, two tackles for loss, a pass break-up, and a blocked kick. In the 2006 season, he played in 11 games and had 44 tackles, 4.5 tackles for loss, one sack, one forced fumble, and two blocked kicks. In the 2007 season, he played in 11 games and had 78 total tackles, four tackles for loss, one interception, and two pass break-ups. In the 2008 season, 73 total tackles, nine tackles for a loss, two sacks, and three pass breakups.

== Professional career ==
Pre-draft measurables
Height	Weight	40-yard dash	10-yard split	20-yard split	20-yard shuttle	Three-cone drill	Vertical jump	Broad jump	Bench press
5 ft 10 3/4 in (1.80 m)	244 lb (111 kg)	4.59 s	1.56 s	2.58 s	4.27 s	6.94 s	32.0 in (0.81 m)	9 ft 4 in (2.84 m)	24 reps
All values from Pro Day

=== Washington Redskins ===
==== 2009 season ====
On May 4, 2009, Young signed with the Washington Redskins as an undrafted free agent. He was waived by on September 5, 2009, but added to the team's practice squad two days later. Young was released on September 24, 2009.

==== 2010 season ====
Young signed a futures contract with the Washington Redskins on January 5, 2010. When he reported for camp, Young was surprised to learn that he had been converted to a fullback. Head coach Mike Shanahan stated, "Just the way he hit, we needed some fullbacks and we thought since he had good hands he might be the ideal candidate," which was the reason for Young's transition. The position wasn't completely foreign to Young, who was recruited to Villanova as a running back before he was moved to linebacker. He ended up making the Redskins' final 53-man roster as the backup fullback after all cuts were made. On November 15, 2010, Young scored his first career receiving touchdown, a three-yard reception from Donovan McNabb, in a 59–28 loss to the Philadelphia Eagles.

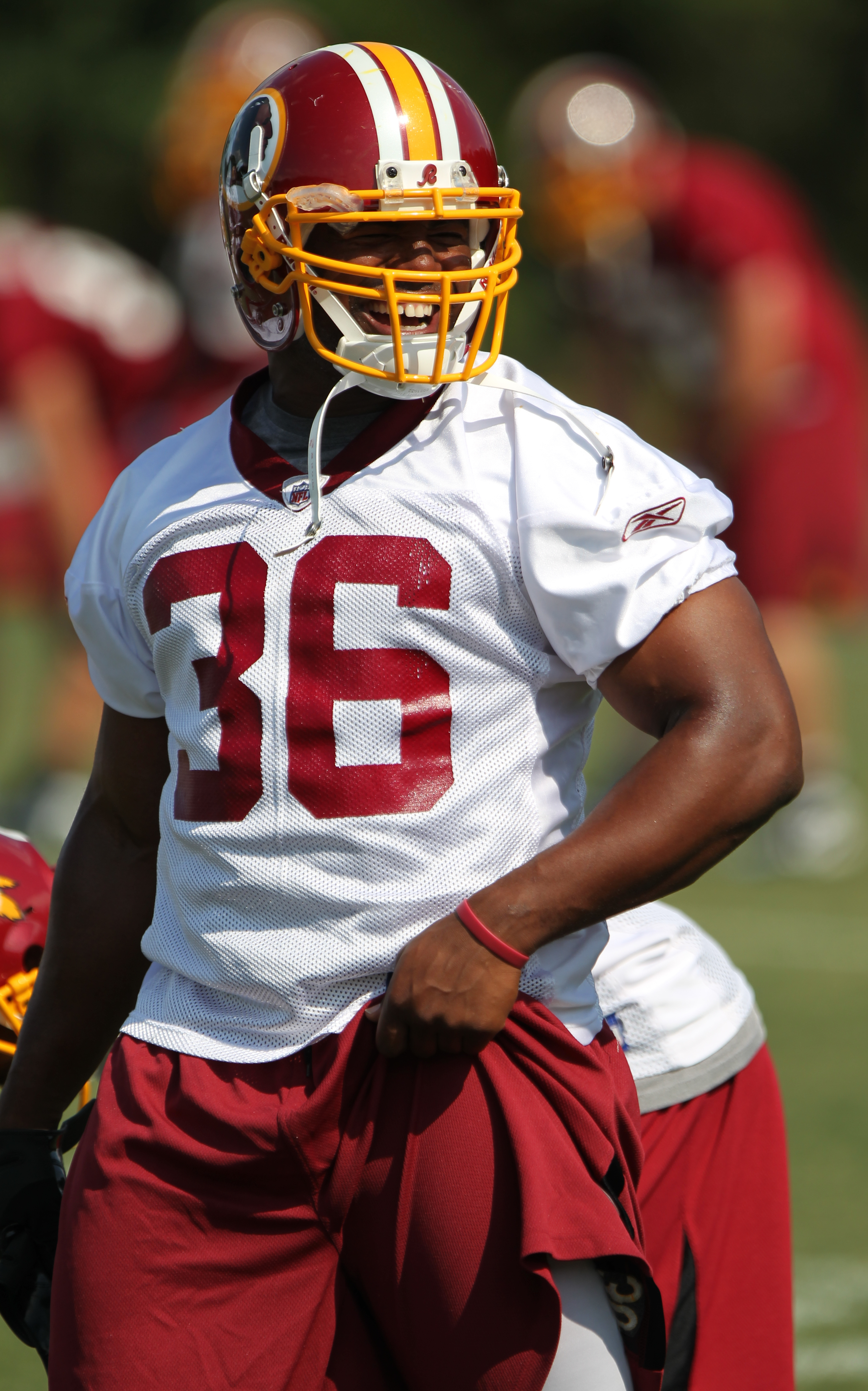
Young at Redskins training camp in 2011

==== 2011 season ====
Young was named the starting fullback for the Washington Redskins at the beginning of training camp in 2011. He scored his first career rushing touchdown in Week 15 in a 23–10 victory over the New York Giants. In Week 16 against the Minnesota Vikings, Young had a costly holding penalty called on him that nullified Brandon Banks's 59-yard touchdown run. Overall, in the 2011 season, he finished with 15 receptions for 146 receiving yards and six carries for 33 rushing yards and a rushing touchdown.

==== 2012 season ====
Despite missing every preseason game, Young was able to start in the season opener against the New Orleans Saints. In the Week 6 38–26 win against the Minnesota Vikings, he caught a six-yard pass from Robert Griffin III for a touchdown. He scored his second touchdown for the season in a 31–6 victory over the Philadelphia Eagles after catching another six-yard pass in the endzone. Overall, in the 2012 season, he finished with 14 carries for 60 rushing yards to go along with eight receptions for 109 receiving yards and two receiving touchdowns. He contributed on special teams.

==== 2013 season ====
Set to be a restricted free agent in the 2013 season, Young re-signed with the Redskins to a $6.2 million, three-year contract on March 9, 2013. On November 3, 2013, Young recorded three rushing touchdowns, the last being the game-winning score in overtime against the San Diego Chargers. He scored a 62-yard touchdown reception in a 24–16 loss to the Philadelphia Eagles in Week 11. Overall, he finished the 2013 season with 12 carries for 41 rushing yards and three rushing touchdowns to go along with four receptions for 71 receiving yards and a receiving touchdown. In addition, he contributed on special teams.

==== 2014 season ====
In the season opener against the Houston Texans, Young scored a rushing touchdown in the 17–6 loss. In the Week 2 game against the Jacksonville Jaguars, he contributed to the 41–10 win with a 20-yard touchdown reception. Young scored two rushing touchdowns in the 27–24 victory over the Philadelphia Eagles in Week 16 that took the Eagles out of playoff contention. Overall, he finished the 2014 season with 11 receptions for 81 receiving yards and two receiving touchdowns to go along with nine carries for 22 rushing yards and three rushing touchdowns. He contributed on special teams in addition to his offensive role.

==== 2015 season ====
In the 2015 season, Young's role in the offense was lessened. On the season, he totaled six carries for ten rushing yards to go along with six receptions for 22 receiving yards to go along with a role on special taems. After the season, he was not retained by the team.

=== Chicago Bears ===
On August 3, 2016, Young signed with the Chicago Bears. On August 28, 2016, he was released by the Bears.

=== Carolina Panthers ===
On January 4, 2017, Young signed a reserve/future contract with the Carolina Panthers. He was released on September 2, 2017.

=== Career statistics ===
Season	Team	Games		Rushing					Receiving					Fumbles	
Season	Team	GP	GS	Att	Yds	Avg	Lng	TD	Rec	Yds	Avg	Lng	TD	Fum	Lost
2010	WAS	16	0	4	19	4.8	16	0	1	3	3.0	3	1	0	0
2011	WAS	13	8	6	33	5.5	12	1	15	146	9.7	27	0	0	0
2012	WAS	16	8	14	60	4.3	16	0	8	109	13.6	28	2	0	0
2013	WAS	13	7	12	41	3.4	19	3	4	71	17.8	62	1	0	0
2014	WAS	16	10	9	22	2.4	14	3	11	81	7.4	20	2	0	0
2015	WAS	16	3	6	10	1.7	5	0	6	22	3.7	8	0	1	0
Career		90	36	51	185	3.6	19	7	45	432	9.6	62	6	1	0

== Post-playing career ==
Young became the director of player development for the Pittsburgh Steelers in 2021.
