= Rob Jackson (American football) =

American football player (born 1985)

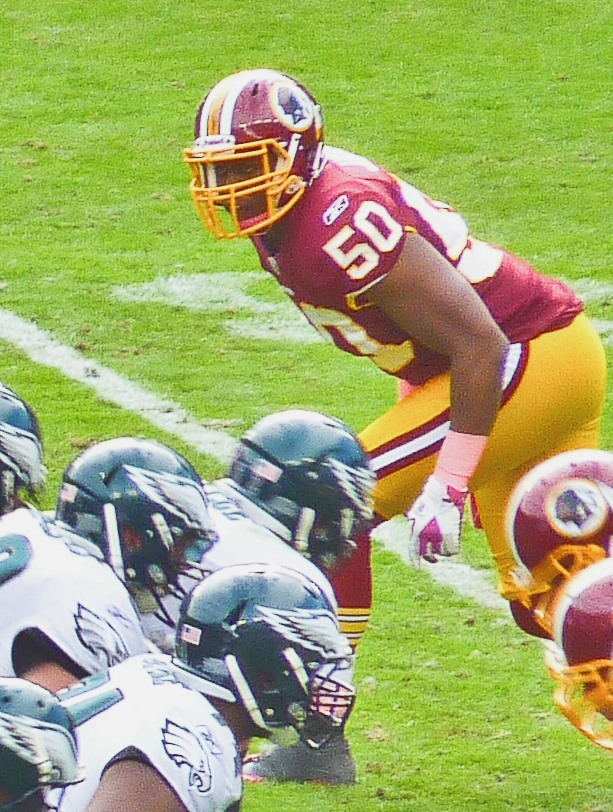
- Jackson with the Washington Redskins in 2011

No. 98, 91, 50
- Position: Linebacker

Personal information
- Born: November 3, 1985 (age 41); West Haven, Connecticut, U.S.
- Listed height: 6 ft 4 in (1.93 m)
- Listed weight: 259 lb (117 kg)

Career information
- High school: West Haven
- College: Fort Scott CC (2004-2005); Kansas State (2006-2007)
- NFL draft: 2008: 7th round, 242nd overall pick

Career history
- Washington Redskins (2008–2013)

Awards and highlights
- 2× First-team All-Jayhawk Conference (2004, 2005)

Career NFL statistics
- Total tackles: 71
- Sacks: 7.5
- Forced fumbles: 3
- Fumble recoveries: 1
- Interceptions: 5
- Defensive touchdowns: 1
- Stats at Pro Football Reference

Robert Gene Jackson (born November 3, 1985) is an American former professional football player who was a linebacker for six seasons in the National Football League (NFL). He played college football for the Kansas State Wildcats and was selected by the Washington Redskins in the seventh round of the 2008 NFL draft as a defensive end.

== Early life ==
Jackson prepped at West Haven High School, West Haven, CT, where he was considered the No. 16 overall prospect in New England by SuperPrep. He earned All-Area and All-State honors at defensive end in 2003 when he Totaled 72 tackles, including 12 sacks. He won a state championship in 2002 in high school.

== College career ==
Jackson attended junior college at Fort Scott Community College, located in Fort Scott, Kansas. He had 35 tackles (28 solo), including nine for losses (six sacks) in eight games on defense and caught four receptions for 90 yards as a tight end and totaled 45 tackles (34 solo) in nine games as a freshman and led the Kansas Jayhawk Community College Conference in sacks during 2004 with 9. He played both defensive end and tight end as a sophomore. He was a two-time first-team All-Jayhawk Conference defensive selection. Jackson then went on to play collegiate football at Kansas State University. In 2006, he started 12 of 13 games and earned honorable mention All-Big 12 after making 36 tackles (8.5 for losses and 4.5 sacks, two pass break-ups and one forced fumble. In 2007, Jackson started 11 of 12 games. He ended the season with 25 tackles, 4.5 for loss, and 2 sacks and one pass broken up.

== Professional career ==
=== Pre-draft ===
Jackson measured in at a height of 6 ft 3 3/8 in (1.915 m) and a weight of 257 pounds (117 kg) at his Pro Day. He ran the 40 yd (37 m) dash in 4.78 seconds, measured a 28 in (710 mm) vertical jump, and completed 13 repetitions on the 225-pound (102 kg) bench press.

=== Washington Redskins ===
==== 2008 season ====
Jackson was selected by the Washington Redskins in the seventh round (242nd overall) of the 2008 NFL draft on April 27, 2008. The pick represented the Redskins’ ninth pick of the 2008 Draft. He made his NFL debut against the Dallas Cowboys in Week 4 of the 2008 season. Jackson finished his rookie season playing in only three games and recording only a single tackle.

==== 2009 season ====
On September 5, 2009, Jackson was waived by the Redskins. He was signed to the Redskins' practice squad the next day. Jackson was promoted to the active roster on November 30, 2009, due to injury of Jeremy Jarmon.

==== 2010 season ====
On September 4, 2010, Jackson was released by the Redskins. The next day, he was signed to the Redskins' practice squad again. Originally being a defensive end, Jackson was converted into an outside linebacker when the Redskins switched to a 3-4 defense in the 2010 NFL season. Jackson was promoted to the active 53-man roster on December 20, 2010, due to Brian Orakpo suffering a groin injury. In the Week 16 game against the Jacksonville Jaguars, Jackson recorded his first career sack, which helped the Redskins beat the Jaguars in overtime.

==== 2011 season ====
In the 2011 season, Jackson was made the backup right outside linebacker for Brian Orakpo. In Week 17 against the Philadelphia Eagles, Jackson subbed in for Orakpo in the second half of the game after the latter injured his shoulder after sacking Michael Vick. At the end of the season, Jackson played all 16 games for the first time in his career.

==== 2012 season ====
In Week 3 against the Cincinnati Bengals, Jackson had his first career start at the right outside linebacker after Brian Orakpo was placed on injured reserve after tearing his left pectoral muscle in Week 2 against the St. Louis Rams. In the game, he scored the Redskins' first touchdown after he intercepted Andy Dalton and landed in the endzone; it was his first career interception and touchdown. He recorded his second career interception on Eli Manning in the Week 7 game against the New York Giants. In the Week 14 game against the Baltimore Ravens, Jackson managed to strip the ball away from Joe Flacco as he was sacking him and recovered the ball. This turnover would lead to the Redskins scoring a field goal helping to tie the game and eventually winning in overtime. The following week, he would record his third career interception in the win over the Cleveland Browns. Two weeks later, he secured his fourth interception of the year against the Dallas Cowboys in a win that won the team the title of NFC East Champion.

==== 2013 season ====
Set to be a restricted free agent in the 2013 season, Jackson agreed to re-sign with the Redskins on a one-year deal on March 9, 2013. On March 20, it was announced that Jackson would be suspended for the first four games of the season due to violating the league's substance abuse policy.

==== 2014 season ====
Jackson re-signed with the Redskins again on April 4, 2014. He was released on August 24.
