= Anthony Armstrong (American football) =

American football player (born 1983)

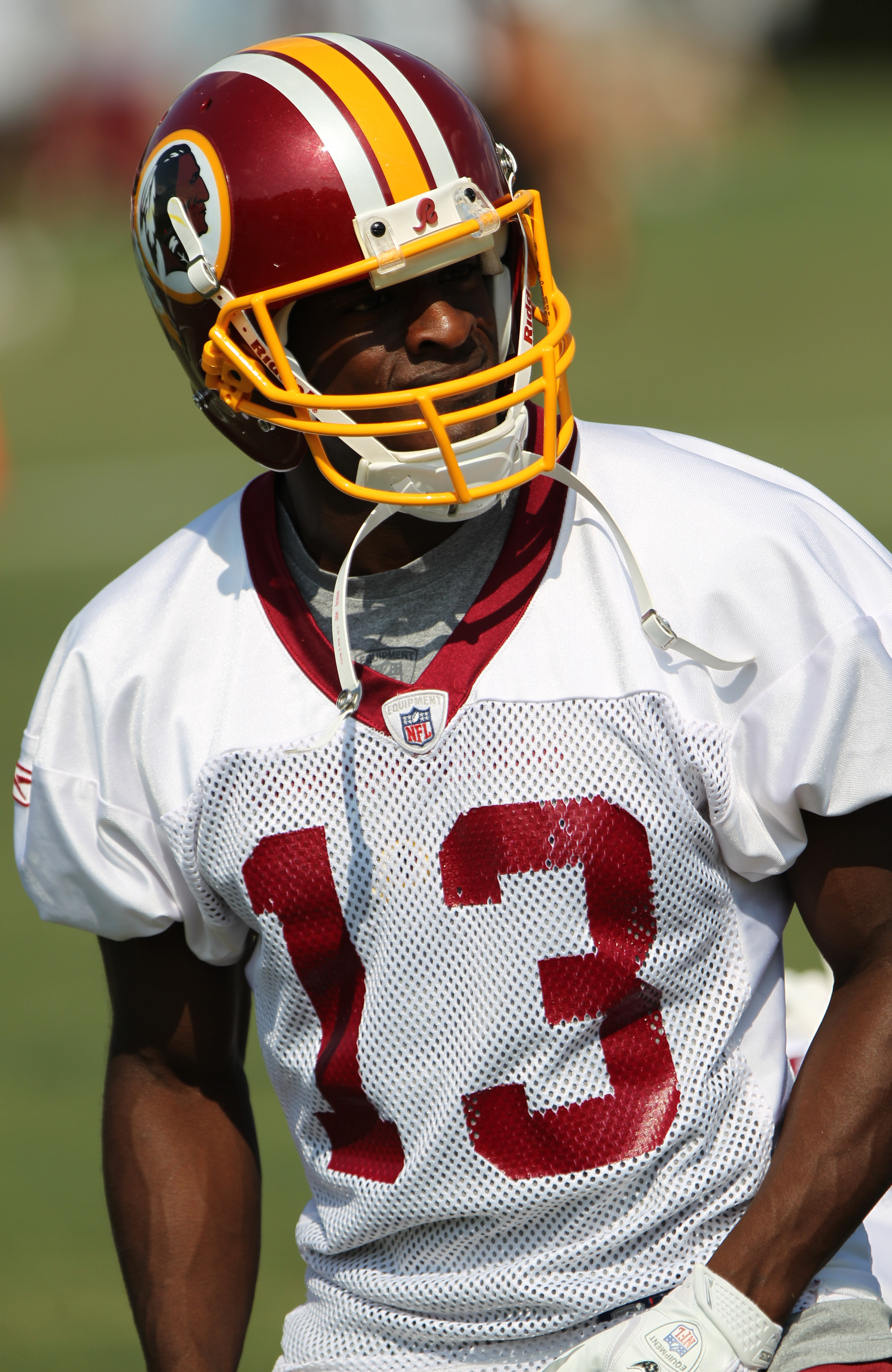
- Armstrong at Washington Redskins 2011 training camp.

No. 13, 87
- Position: Wide receiver

Personal information
- Born: March 29, 1983 (age 43); Greencastle, Indiana, U.S.
- Listed height: 5 ft 11 in (1.80 m)
- Listed weight: 175 lb (79 kg)

Career information
- High school: Carrollton (TX) Newman Smith
- College: West Texas A&M
- NFL draft: 2005: undrafted

Career history
- Odessa Roughnecks (2006); Dallas Desperados (2007–2008); Miami Dolphins (2008–2009)*; Washington Redskins (2009–2011); Miami Dolphins (2012); Jacksonville Jaguars (2012); Dallas Cowboys (2012); Cleveland Browns (2014)*
- * Offseason or practice squad member only

Awards and highlights
- First-team All-LSC (2003); Second-team All-LSC (2004)

Career NFL statistics
- Receptions: 54
- Receiving yards: 986
- Receiving average: 18.3
- Receiving touchdowns: 5
- Stats at Pro Football Reference

Career AFL statistics
- Receptions: 95
- Receiving yards: 1,288
- Receiving touchdowns: 20
- Stats at ArenaFan.com

Anthony A. Armstrong (born March 29, 1983) is an American former professional football player who was a wide receiver in the National Football League (NFL). He played college football for the West Texas A&M Buffaloes and was signed as an undrafted free agent by the Miami Dolphins in 2008.

He was also a member of the Washington Redskins and Jacksonville Jaguars. Before joining the NFL, Armstrong was a member of the Dallas Desperados of the Arena Football League and the Odessa Roughnecks of the Intense Football League.

== Early life ==
Armstrong was born on March 29, 1983, in Greencastle, Indiana. His mother, Gwen Armstrong, worked as an Administration Manager at IBM and his father, Thomas Armstrong, died when Anthony was 2 days short of 6 years old. Anthony is a middle child of 4. He has a brother named Courtney Lee and two sisters, Catrina Scott and Ashley Armstrong . When Anthony was a teenager, he played high school football at Newman Smith High School. During his senior season, he had 11 receptions for 250 yards and three touchdowns and was named to the All-Metrocrest second-team. He also lettered twice as a member of the track and field team and competed in the 100-meter dash.

== College career ==
Armstrong attended and played college football at West Texas A&M University, a Division II school in Canyon, Texas. As a freshman, he played in ten games and had 165 yards and one touchdown on 13 catches. The following season, he played in ten games and recorded 24 receptions for 256 yards. As a junior, Armstrong started all 11 games and caught 54 passes for 740 yards and four touchdowns. He was named the LSC South Receiver of the Year and earned first-team All-LSC South honors. In his final college season, Armstrong was named second-team All-LSC as a senior after leading the team with 54 catches for 607 yards and four touchdowns. He finished his four-year letterman career as West Texas A&M's fourth leading receiver with 145 receptions for 1,768 yards and nine touchdowns.

Armstrong graduated from West Texas A&M with a degree in marketing.

== Arena and Indoor football career ==
Armstrong was signed by the Odessa Roughnecks of the Intense Football League in 2006. In 13 games for the Roughnecks, he had 55 receptions for 760 yards and 18 touchdowns and returned seven kickoffs for 166 yards and a touchdown. He was the team's second leading rusher and rushed four times for 39 yards and three touchdowns. Armstrong also had eight tackles, two pass breakups and a fumble recovery on defense. His best game was against the Louisiana Swashbucklers on July 1, 2006, during which he registered 11 receptions for 157 yards and three touchdowns. The Roughnecks won the IFL championship during Armstrong's only season on the team.

In 2007, Armstrong joined the Dallas Desperados of the Arena Football League as a practice squad member and was signed to active roster on March 25, 2007. He made his AFL debut against the Austin Wranglers on March 31, 2007, where he recovered an onside kick and returned it 40 yards for the game-winning touchdown. Armstrong was placed on the Reserve/Injured list with a hamstring injury on May 2 and missed the remainder of the season, after recording ten catches for 126 yards and two touchdowns in four games. He played the entire 2008 season with the Desperados and posted 85 catches for 1,148 yards and 18 touchdowns. He additionally returned seven kickoffs for 31 yards helping the team compile a 12–4 regular season record and a berth to the AFL playoffs.

== National Football League career ==
=== Miami Dolphins ===
After the Arena Football League season, Armstrong was signed with the Miami Dolphins' practice squad as an unrestricted free agent on July 25, 2008. He stayed on the practice squad the entire season and the 2009 preseason, but was waived August 29, 2009.

=== Washington Redskins ===
==== 2009 season ====
Armstrong signed with the Washington Redskins on October 21, 2009, and spent the final 10 weeks on the Redskins' practice squad.

==== 2010 season ====
Armstrong made his first regular season NFL career catch for 11 yards on September 12, 2010, in a 13–7 win over the Dallas Cowboys and soon emerged as one of the Redskins' primary deep threats. He recorded a career long 76-yard reception against the Philadelphia Eagles on November 15, 2010, finishing fourth among all receivers with 7 receptions of 40 yards or more for the 2010–2011 season. Among receivers with at least 20 receptions over the season, Armstrong finished third with 19.8 yards/catch.

==== 2011 season ====
In Week 1 against the New York Giants, Armstrong made his first touchdown of the 2011 season. He would not get another touchdown until Week 12 against the Seattle Seahawks, where he caught a 50-yard touchdown pass from Rex Grossman helping to end the Redskins' six-game losing streak.

==== 2012 season ====
The Redskins released Armstrong on August 31, 2012, for final roster cuts before the start of the 2012 season and he was picked up by the Dolphins.

=== Miami Dolphins (second stint) ===
On September 1, 2012, Armstrong was claimed off waivers by the Dolphins. He was waived on October 30.

=== Jacksonville Jaguars ===
Armstrong was signed by the Jacksonville Jaguars on October 31, 2012. He was released by the team on November 12.

=== Dallas Cowboys ===
After working out with the Dallas Cowboys on November 21, 2012, the team signed Armstrong on November 26. He was released on December 22.

On January 7, 2013, Armstrong signed a one-year, $630,000 contract. He was released on March 27. On April 3, Armstrong re-signed with the Cowboys. He was released by the team on August 31.

=== Cleveland Browns ===
Armstrong signed with the Cleveland Browns on May 19, 2014. He was released by the team on August 25.
