= Joe Joseph =

American football player (born 1985)

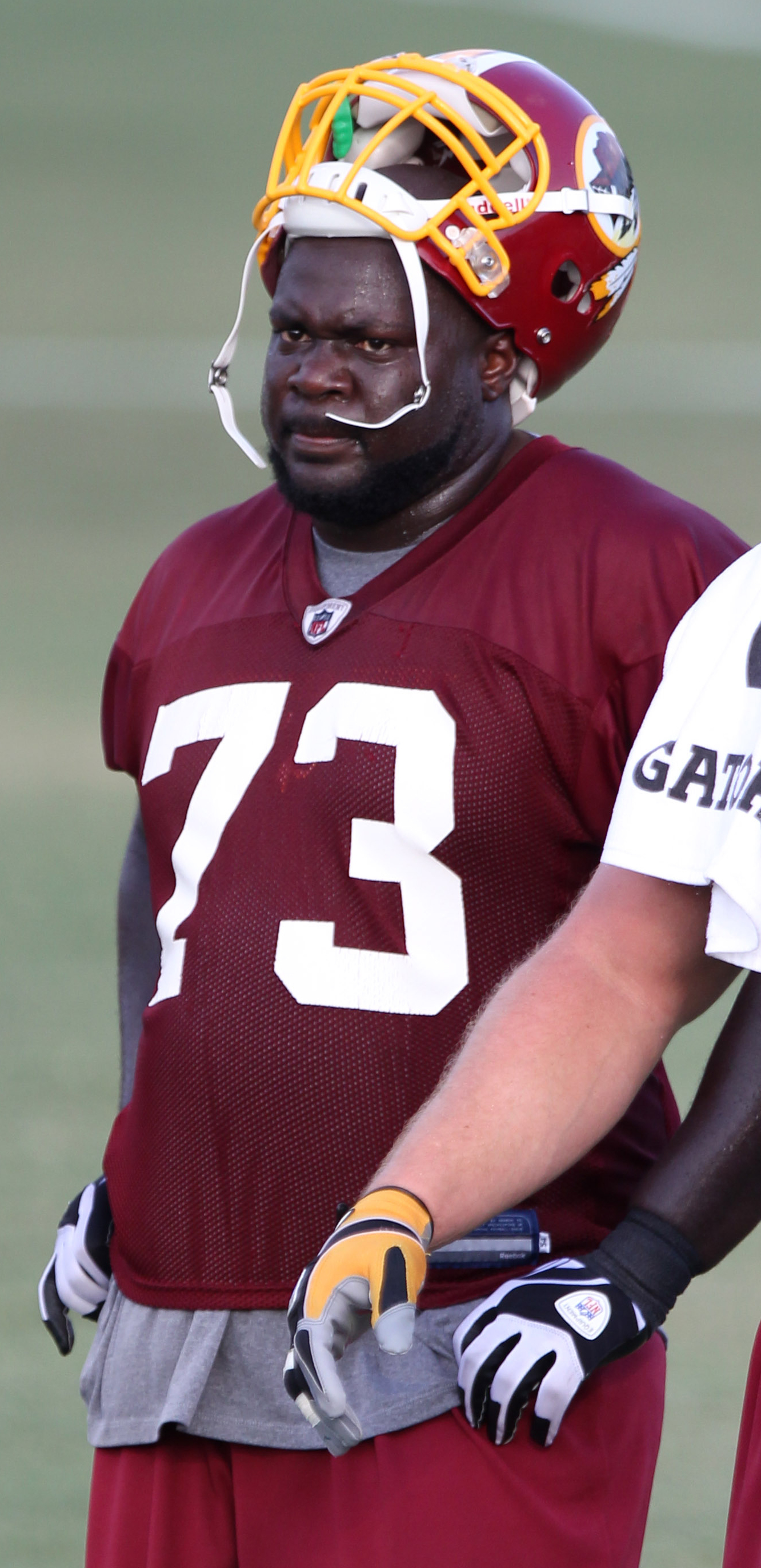
- Joseph with the Washington Redskins in 2011

No. 73
- Position: Nose tackle

Personal information
- Born: October 20, 1985 (age 41); Orlando, Florida, U.S.
- Died: 16 October 2025
- Listed height: 6 ft 2 in (1.88 m)
- Listed weight: 315 lb (143 kg)

Career information
- College: Miami
- NFL draft: 2010: undrafted

Career history
- Tennessee Titans (2010)*; New York Giants (2010)*; Washington Redskins (2010)
- * Offseason or practice squad member only
- Stats at Pro Football Reference

Joe Louis Joseph Jr. (born October 20, 1985) was an American former professional football player who was a defensive end in the National Football League (NFL). He was signed by the Tennessee Titans as an undrafted free agent in 2010. He played college football for the Miami Hurricanes.

Joseph was also a member of the New York Giants and Washington Redskins.

== Professional career ==
=== Tennessee Titans ===
After going undrafted in the 2010 NFL draft, Joseph signed with the Tennessee Titans as an undrafted free agent on April 25, 2010. He was cut on September 4, 2010.

=== New York Giants ===
The New York Giants signed Joseph to their practice squad on November 30, 2010. He was released on December 14.

=== Washington Redskins ===
Joseph was signed to the Washington Redskins practice squad on December 15, 2010. He was promoted to the active roster on December 25, and played in his first NFL game on December 26, against the Jacksonville Jaguars. He was waived on August 6, 2011.
