= Ryan Torain =

American football player (born 1986)

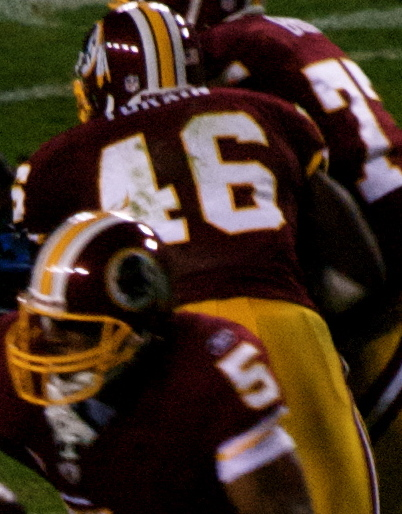
- Torain (46) with the Washington Redskins in 2010

No. 42, 46, 41
- Position: Running back

Personal information
- Born: August 10, 1986 (age 40); Topeka, Kansas, U.S.
- Listed height: 6 ft 1 in (1.85 m)
- Listed weight: 212 lb (96 kg)

Career information
- High school: Topeka West; Shawnee Mission Northwest (Shawnee, Kansas)
- College: Butler CC (2004–2005); Arizona State (2006–2007)
- NFL draft: 2008: 5th round, 139th overall pick

Career history
- Denver Broncos (2008); Washington Redskins (2010–2011); New York Giants (2012)

Awards and highlights
- Second-team All-Pac-10 (2006)

Career NFL statistics
- Rushing attempts: 238
- Rushing yards: 1,011
- Rushing touchdowns: 6
- Receptions: 24
- Receiving yards: 148
- Receiving touchdowns: 2
- Stats at Pro Football Reference

Ryan Devon Torain (born August 10, 1986) is an American former professional football player who was a running back in the National Football League (NFL). He was selected by the Denver Broncos in the fifth round of the 2008 NFL draft. He played college football for the Arizona State Sun Devils.

He also played for the Washington Redskins and New York Giants.

== Early life ==
Torain lived in Topeka, Kansas, attended Whitson Elementary School, French Middle School, and Topeka West High School. He resided in the Montara Neighborhood before moving to Shawnee, Kansas during his high school years. Torain attended Shawnee Mission Northwest High School in Shawnee. He was a letterman in football, basketball, and track & field. Torain graduated in 2004 when he was a first team All-League selection and an All-State Class 6A selection in football.

== College career ==
Torain attended Arizona State University after graduating from Butler County Community College. He earned second-team All-Pac-10 honors as a junior and was one of the Pac-10's elite backs until his senior season was cut short midway through 2007. Torain ran for 1,229 yards in 2006, becoming ASU's first 1,000-yard runner since Delvon Flowers in 2001 and running for the eighth-most single-season yards in ASU history. Compiling the most yards since Sun Devil great Freddie Williams' total on ASU's legendary, undefeated 1975 squad. Ryan totaled the fourth-most rushing yards by a player in his debut season in the history of the Pac-10 Conference. He ranked 13th in the Nation and second in the Pac-10 Conference among returning backs in total rushing yards. He also led the team with 10 total touchdowns as a junior.

An excellent receiving threat, Torain was ASU's second-leading returning receiver for 2007 and led all returning Pac-10 tailbacks in yards-per-catch average (11.4) and touchdown receptions (3). Ryan ran for over 100 yards in seven games and 70 or more yards in 12 of 19 contests. He rushed for career-highs of 191 yards on 24 carries at California on Sept. 23, 2006. Torain was listed by ESPN's Mel Kiper Jr. as the No. 2 senior running back in the nation for 2007. He appeared in 19 games with 14 starts carrying 323 times for 1,782 yards (5.5 avg.). He caught 25 passes for 305 yards (12.2 avg.) with five touchdowns and 12 rushing touchdowns. He averaged 93.8 rushing yards-per-game for his career.

== Professional career ==
=== Denver Broncos ===
The Broncos selected Torain in the fifth round (148th overall) of the 2008 NFL draft. He fractured his elbow in early August and missed three months of the season.

Torain made his NFL debut in a game against the Miami Dolphins, earning only one yard on three carries in a loss. He started his first NFL game on November 6, 2008, against the Cleveland Browns. After rushing for 68 yards and a touchdown on 12 carries, Torain hurt his knee as he was being tackled in the second quarter. He suffered a torn anterior cruciate ligament (ACL) and was placed on a season-ending injured reserve. He became the third running back to be out for the season for the Broncos, joining Michael Pittman, and Andre Hall.

Torain was waived by the Broncos on August 12, 2009, and subsequently reverted to injured reserve. He was released with an injury settlement on August 16.

=== Washington Redskins ===
On April 19, 2010, Torain was signed by the Washington Redskins, whose head coach, Mike Shanahan, as then-head coach of the Denver Broncos, had drafted Torain in 2008.

On September 4, 2010, Torain was released by the Redskins, but was re-signed to the practice squad on September 24, 2010, and was elevated to the 53-man team roster as Brandon Banks was released. In his first game back he had 7 carries for 46 yards with a 6.6 yard average. Ryan was designated to replace Clinton Portis as the principal running back. Portis suffered a groin pull during the Redskins' Week 4 victory at Philadelphia. After a 70-yard, 1-touchdown performance against the Eagles, Torain served as the Redskins' primary running back for the next five weeks. He had a 100-yard game and two touchdowns against the Indianapolis Colts, then a career-high 125 yards against the Chicago Bears. Torain suffered a hamstring injury the next week in a game against the Detroit Lions. He returned after his injury and rushed for 172 yards in a loss to the Tampa Bay Buccaneers. He was waived on December 27, 2011.

=== New York Giants ===
On November 27, 2012, the New York Giants signed Torain after their second string running back, Andre Brown, was placed on injured reserve with a broken fibula.

Torain re-signed with the Giants on the first day of free agency for the 2013 season on March 12, 2013. He was waived by the Giants on August 31.
