= Jeremy Jarmon =

American football player (born 1987)

No. 90, 93
- Position: Defensive end

Personal information
- Born: November 20, 1987 (age 38); Fort Knox, Kentucky, U.S.
- Listed height: 6 ft 3 in (1.91 m)
- Listed weight: 278 lb (126 kg)

Career information
- High school: Houston (Germantown, Tennessee)
- College: Kentucky
- Supplemental draft: 2009: 3rd round

Career history
- Washington Redskins (2009–2010); Denver Broncos (2011)*
- * Offseason or practice squad member only

Awards and highlights
- Second-team All-SEC (2007)

Career NFL statistics
- Total tackles: 12
- Sacks: 0.5
- Forced fumbles: 1
- Stats at Pro Football Reference

Jeremy Jarmon (born November 30, 1987) is an American former professional football player who was a defensive end in the National Football League (NFL). He was selected by the Washington Redskins in the third round of the 2009 Supplemental draft. He played college football for the Kentucky Wildcats.

He was also a member of the Denver Broncos.

== Early life ==
Jarmon was a three-year letterman and two-year starter at Houston High School in Germantown, Tennessee. As a senior, he made 50 tackles, including 20 tackles for loss, and 10 quarterback sacks while also causing several fumbles. He helped lead the football team to a 10–3 record, reaching the quarterfinals of the Class AAAAA (largest classification) playoffs. He was an All-district, All-region and honorable-mention All-state. He played fullback and tight end on offense, defensive end on defense.

A budding actor, Jarmon portrayed a lead role in two theatrical productions; Macduff in Shakespeare's Macbeth and Colonel Jessep (the Jack Nicholson role) in "A Few Good Men".

He graduated from high school at age 17.

== College career ==
Jarmon played at the University of Kentucky. He started 31-of-39 games at the University of Kentucky the last three years, totaling 17.5 sacks. Jarmon, as a redshirt junior was named Second-team All-SEC by Phil Steele's College Football and an honorable-mention performer by The Associated Press and totaled 38 stops (10 for a loss and 4.5 sacks) while starting 12 games.

As a redshirt sophomore, was named First-team All-SEC by Rivals.com and Second-team All-SEC by league coaches and made 62 tackles, fourth on the team and was fourth in the SEC in quarterback sacks with nine and tenth in the league in total tackles for loss with 13.5. He played in all 13 games, starting six during redshirt freshman season and tied for second on the team in tackles for loss with 6.5. He has run the 40-yard dash in 4.71 seconds, an excellent clocking for a defensive lineman.

President of the Pamoja Diversity Club, also a member of the Thespian Honor Society and French Club.

During the end of his junior year, Jarmon tested positive for a banned supplement. The supplement had been purchased over-the-counter at a nutrition store as a dietary aid while he was recuperating from an injury. Despite self-reporting and that the substance was not an enhancer, the NCAA suspended Jarmon for his senior year. He subsequently entered the NFL supplemental draft and was taken with a 3rd-round pick by the Washington Redskins.

== Professional career ==
=== Washington Redskins ===
He was selected by the Redskins in the third round of the 2009 Supplemental draft.

=== Denver Broncos ===
After two seasons in Washington, Jarmon was traded on July 27, 2011, to the Denver Broncos for wide receiver Jabar Gaffney. Jarmon was cut on September 3, 2011, as the Broncos made final decisions for their 53-man roster. The front office called it a "tough cut," noting that Jarmon's attempted switch to defensive tackle likely hurt his development.

=== Retirement ===
On July 11, 2012, on Kentucky Sports Radio, Jarmon announced that he was officially retiring from the NFL at the age of 24.
