= Kevin Barnes (American football) =

American football player (born 1986)

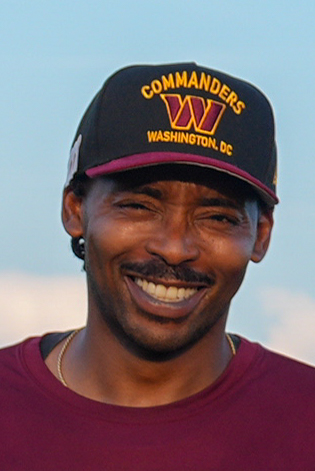
- Barnes in 2025

No. 25, 22, 32
- Position: Cornerback

Personal information
- Born: September 15, 1986 (age 40); Fayetteville, North Carolina, U.S.
- Listed height: 6 ft 1 in (1.85 m)
- Listed weight: 190 lb (86 kg)

Career information
- High school: Old Mill (Millersville, Maryland)
- College: Maryland (2004–2008)
- NFL draft: 2009: 3rd round, 80th overall pick

Career history
- Washington Redskins (2009–2011); Detroit Lions (2012); Cleveland Browns (2013)*; Hamilton Tiger-Cats (2013)
- * Offseason or practice squad member only

Career NFL statistics
- Tackles: 45
- Pass deflections: 9
- Interceptions: 3
- Stats at Pro Football Reference

Kevin Barnes (born September 15, 1986) is an American former professional football player who was a cornerback in the National Football League (NFL). He played college football for the Maryland Terrapins and was selected by the Washington Redskins in the third round of the 2009 NFL draft. Barnes was also a member of the Detroit Lions, Cleveland Browns, and the CFL's Hamilton Tiger-Cats.

== Early life ==
Barnes was born in Fayetteville, North Carolina, on September 15, 1986, and raised in Dunn, North Carolina, but later moved to Glen Burnie, Maryland, where he was raised by parents Kenneth and Debra Hilliard. He attended Old Mill High School, where he played football as a cornerback and wide receiver. Barnes also played basketball and competed in track and field.

As a junior in 2002, he recorded ten receptions for 222 yards and four touchdowns. That year, he was named an Associated Press Big School second-team all-state, Baltimore Sun honorable mention All-Met, and all-county player. As a senior in 2003, Barnes recorded 62 tackles, including 32 solo, three interceptions, and three broken-up passes. That year, he was named an Associated Press Big School all-state, Baltimore Sun All-Met, and Washington Post honorable mention All-Met.

Barnes was named a SuperPrep Mid-Atlantic all-region and PrepStar all-region player. He was not highly recruited, however, and was rated a two-star prospect by Scout.com. Duke and Virginia recruited him before he committed early to Maryland.

== College career ==
Barnes redshirted in 2004 and was named the defensive scout team player of the week prior to the NC State and Virginia Tech games. In 2005, he saw action in ten games, mostly on special teams. He recorded four solo tackles and a pass broken up. In 2006, Barnes played in all 13 games including one start, the first of his career, against Florida International. That season, he compiled 11 tackles, which included nine solo.

In 2007, he was the first on the team in interceptions with four, second in passes broken up with nine, and fifth in tackles with 65, including 47 solo. He recorded the most interceptions by a Maryland player since Domonique Foxworth in 2002. After the 2007 season, the Terrapins lost three starters in the secondary to graduation, and Barnes stepped in to assume a leadership role during his senior year.

As a fifth-year senior in 2008, Barnes played in the first seven games before suffering a shoulder injury. He recorded two interceptions returned for 27 yards, 20 tackles including 15 solo, five passes broken up, seven passes defended, two forced fumbles, and one blocked kick.

In the third game of the season, against California, Barnes gained notoriety for the delivery of a hard hit against running back Jahvid Best, an early Heisman Trophy prospect. Late in the second quarter, Cal quarterback Kevin Riley recognized Maryland was in man-to-man coverage. Since he saw there were no safeties in the middle of the field, he threw a short screen pass to Best. Barnes, who had anticipated the play from the snap, immediately delivered a bone-jarring tackle that almost knocked off Best's helmet. While still lying on the field, Best rolled onto his side to vomit. Footage of the hit and its aftermath circulated widely on the internet and became a viral video phenomenon that received 50,000 views on YouTube within a week. After the game, Best said, "That's probably the hardest hit I've ever taken in my life.... It really knocked the wind out of me, and I had a little trouble breathing for the rest of the game." When asked if he felt bad about the tackle, Barnes said, "He's not permanently hurt, so I'm fine with that. Had he died or something, I'd have felt bad, but he'll probably be playing next week."

In the seventh game of the season, he used his left shoulder to hit Wake Forest wide receiver D. J. Boldin, who was attempting to catch a pass. Barnes suffered a torn glenoid labrum, fractured left scapula, damaged rotator cuff, and broken clavicle. The injury ended his season, and he missed the final six games of his senior year. Barnes later remarked, "It was my last hit ... Even though I got hurt, it caused a guy to fumble. I've got to look at it that way. I still have [a] smile on my face." Despite being unable to play, Barnes remained actively involved with the Terrapins for the rest of the season and took on the role of a student coach. Secondary coach Kevin Lempa said:

"He's another coach out there right now.... He's been such an important player for our defense for a long time, and he still wants to help as much as he can. All throughout the game in the pouring rain against NC State, he was talking to the guys on the sideline, so he's like another coach.... We all miss having him on the field, but we're glad he's still with us in some capacity."

Barnes received an unusually early invitation to the 2009 Senior Bowl, on September 18, just five days after the game against California in which he tackled Best. He attended, but due to his shoulder injury, could not participate in the game.

== Professional career ==
Pre-draft measurables
Height	Weight	Arm length	Hand span	40-yard dash	10-yard split	20-yard split	20-yard shuttle	Three-cone drill	Vertical jump	Broad jump	Wonderlic
6 ft 0 1/4 in (1.84 m)	187 lb (85 kg)	32 1/2 in (0.83 m)	8 5/8 in (0.22 m)	4.45 s	1.50 s	2.55 s	3.96 s	6.72 s	41.0 in (1.04 m)	10 ft 8 in (3.25 m)	41
All values from NFL Combine/Pro Day

=== Washington Redskins ===
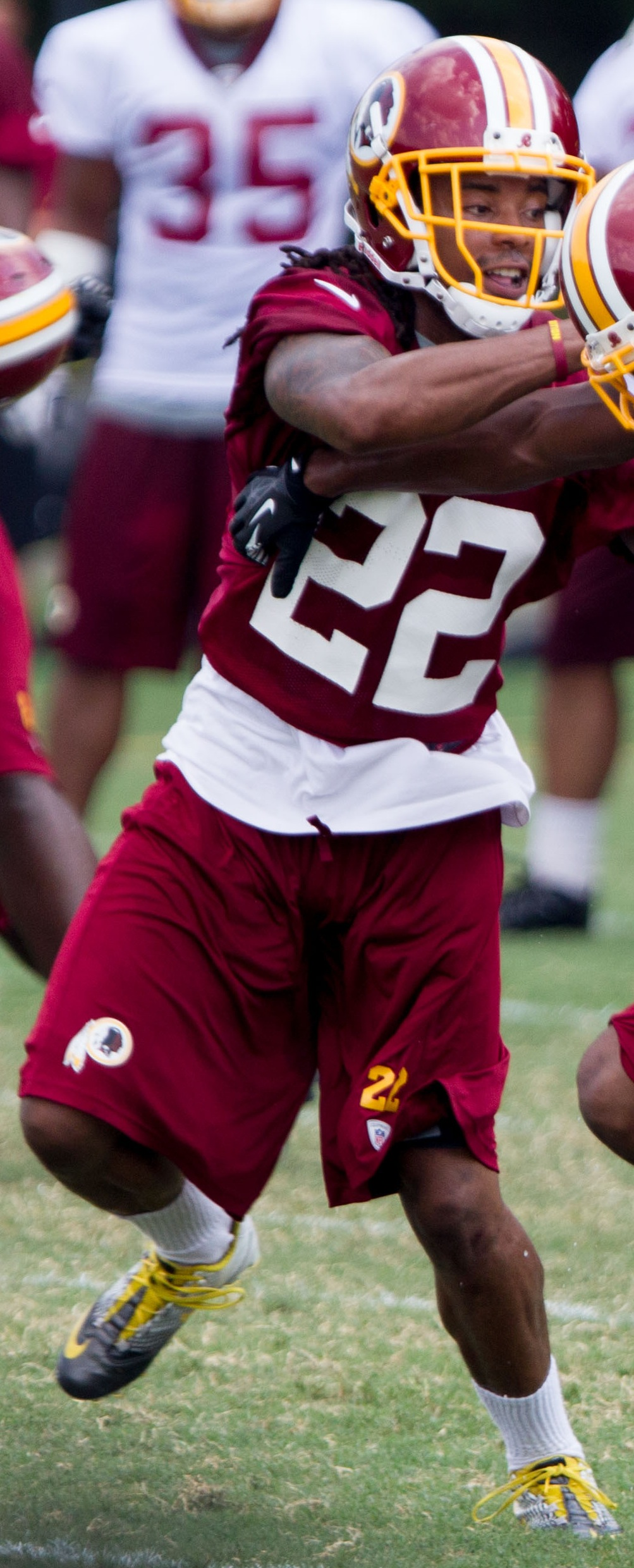
Barnes at Washington Redskins training camp, 2012

==== 2009 season ====
In the 2009 NFL draft, Barnes was selected by the Washington Redskins in the third round as the 80th overall pick. He had participated in the 2009 NFL Combine, where he impressed scouts by scoring highly among cornerbacks in the speed and agility tests. Barnes also scored the highest grade at the combine on the Wonderlic intelligence test with a 41 out of 50, which far exceeded the average prospect's grade of 19. He ran the 40-yard dash in 4.52 seconds, which was 0.06 seconds slower than the fastest time record by a cornerback. His vertical jump of 38.5 inches was the sixth-best recorded by a cornerback. Maryland coaches reportedly told Redskins head coach Jim Zorn that Barnes was "maybe the only guy in that league who could run with wide receiver Darrius Heyward-Bey," who recorded the fastest 40-yard dash time at the combine and was selected seventh overall in the draft.

Zorn also said, "[We were impressed] when we watched him on video, when we interviewed him and talked to people who knew him." Referring to his height and speed, he described Barnes as a leaner version of Carlos Rogers. Unlike some other NFL teams, the Redskins were not concerned about Barnes' injury, and Zorn said his shoulder "was repaired.... He's not going to have a problem at all." His mother is an avid fan of the Dallas Cowboys, the Redskins' biggest rivals. Barnes himself said, "The first team I liked was the Cowboys, so how ironic that I would go to the Redskins, but I love to be a Redskin." After summer minicamp, the Redskins signed Barnes to a four-year contract with a $782,000 signing bonus. Regarding his offseason performance, the club's executive vice president, Vinny Cerrato, said, "It was like a light came on, so Kevin was just playing instead of thinking all the time.... He had four interceptions and was really breaking on the ball." Barnes was expected to compete with Justin Tryon for the fourth cornerback position on the depth chart.

==== 2010 season ====
In camp before the 2010 season, Barnes and veteran cornerback Phillip Buchanon out-performed Tryon, who was eventually traded to the Indianapolis Colts. At the start of the season, with Zorn replaced by Mike Shanahan as head coach, Barnes and linebacker Brian Orakpo were the only players retained from the 2009 draft class. In the second half against the New York Giants, Barnes replaced Buchanon, whom coach Shanahan said "wasn't playing good enough in the first half." Barnes recorded three tackles and defended one pass in the game, which was his most extensive playing time to that point. Against the Jacksonville Jaguars, Barnes started as a safety alongside Macho Harris because of injuries suffered by LaRon Landry, Kareem Moore, and Reed Doughty. In that game, Barnes intercepted a pass from David Garrard in overtime, which set up the game-winning field goal, 20–17.

Prior to the 2011 season, Barnes was named as an Honorable Mention player on ESPN's list of the top 25 breakout players of the 2011 season. Multiple depth charts list Barnes as the starting nickelback and immediate back-up to DeAngelo Hall. Coaches have praised Barnes for his hard work ethic and knowledge of the game. Kevin Barnes intercepted a pass thrown by Tony Romo on Monday Night Football in a Redskins loss (18–16) against the Dallas Cowboys.

==== 2011 season ====
After Carlos Rogers left the team, Barnes switched from his original jersey number of 25 to 22. In the 2011 season, he would serve as the team's nickel cornerback. He would have his first interception of the season and second of his career in Week 3 against the Dallas Cowboys. Barnes would catch another interception in Week 10 against the Miami Dolphins after nose tackle, Barry Cofield, hit Matt Moore's arm while Moore was throwing a pass. He finished the season with 26 combined tackles, four pass breakups, and two interceptions.

==== 2012 season ====
Despite being used as a nickelback last season, it was reported that Barnes has been taking snaps at both the free safety and outside cornerback positions in the 2012 off-season under new defensive backs coach, Raheem Morris. With DeAngelo Hall taking over the nickelback position, he competed with and lost to the Redskins' free agent acquisition, Cedric Griffin, for the second outside cornerback slot opposite to starter, Josh Wilson.

=== Detroit Lions ===
On August 27, 2012, Barnes was traded to the Detroit Lions for an undisclosed draft pick. He was waived on September 18.

=== Cleveland Browns ===
On March 25, 2013, Barnes signed a one-year contract with the Cleveland Browns. He was released on May 13, 2013.
