= 2009 Washington Redskins season =

NFL team season

- Owner: Daniel Snyder
- General manager: Vinny Cerrato
- Head coach: Jim Zorn
- Offensive coordinator: Sherman Lewis
- Defensive coordinator: Greg Blache
- Home stadium: FedExField

Results
- Record: 4–12
- Division place: 4th NFC East
- Playoffs: Did not qualify
- Pro Bowlers: LB London Fletcher; LB Brian Orakpo

The 2009 season was the Washington Redskins' 78th in the National Football League (NFL) and their second and final under head coach Jim Zorn. During the season, long-time general manager Vinny Cerrato resigned on December 17, 2009, and the team hired Bruce Allen before their week 15 game at home on Monday Night Football against the New York Giants.

They failed to improve upon their 8–8 record from 2008 and finished with a 4–12 record, their worst record since 2003, which resulted in Jim Zorn being fired after two seasons. He would be replaced by Mike Shanahan the following season.

As of 2024, the only remaining active member of the 2009 Washington Redskins is Graham Gano, who most recently was a member of the New York Giants.

== Players ==
=== Transactions ===
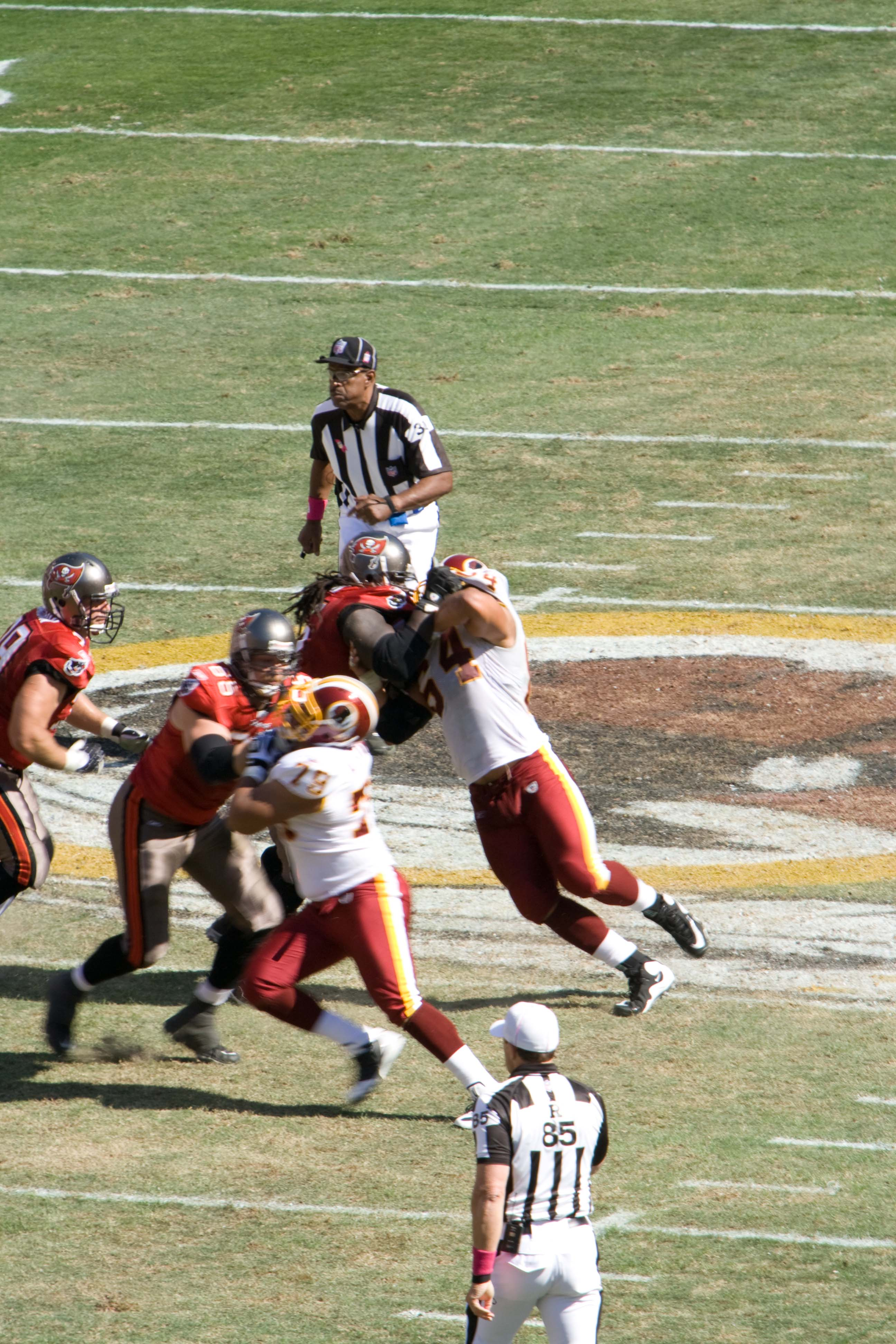
Tampa Bay at Washington on October 4, 2009

The Redskins released linebacker Marcus Washington on February 20, 2009. On February 27, the first day of 2009 free agency, the Redskins made four personnel moves. Five hours into the new free agency period, the team signed a seven-year, $100 million contract with unrestricted free agent, Albert Haynesworth, who spent the first seven seasons of his career playing defensive tackle for the Tennessee Titans. The deal included $41 million guaranteed and could have reached as much as $115 million, based on performance. The Titans requested for the NFL to look into claims that Redskins management tampered with Haynesworth by beginning negotiations with him prior to the start of the free agent period. The Redskins also released cornerback Shawn Springs; agreed to terms with former Buffalo guard (and previous Redskin) Derrick Dockery on a five-year, $26 million contract with $8.2 million in guaranteed money; and agreed with unrestricted free agent DeAngelo Hall on a new six-year, $54 million contract. Hall's new deal contained $23 million in guaranteed money and had a maximum value of $55 million. Hall and Dockery formally signed their contracts on March 3, 2009.

On March 2, 2009, the Redskins released defensive end Jason Taylor after he refused to add a clause to his contract that would have required him to participate in the team's off-season workout program. In the wake of Taylor's release the Redskins re-signed defensive end Phillip Daniels, who had started at left end before a 2008 ACL tear on the first day of training camp led to Taylor's acquisition, and brought back Renaldo Wynn, who had played defensive end for the Redskins between 2002 and 2006. Wynn and Daniels signed one-year, minimum deals on March 24 and April 2, respectively.

In late March and early April 2009, Redskins officials attempted to include starting quarterback Jason Campbell in a trade to acquire Denver Broncos quarterback Jay Cutler; they also attempted to trade Campbell to at least one other team for a second-round pick in the 2009 NFL draft. After Cutler was traded to the Chicago Bears on April 2, Redskins head coach Jim Zorn publicly re-asserted his commitment to Campbell.

On December 17 the team announced the hiring of Bruce Allen as executive vice president of operations and general manager, replacing Vinny Cerrato who resigned on the same day, on December 17, 2009. Allen is the son of former Redskins head coach (1971–77) George Herbert Allen and brother of former Virginia Governor and U.S. Senator George Felix Allen.

=== Free agents in 2009 ===
RFA: Restricted free-agent, UFA: Unrestricted free-agent, ERFA: Exclusive rights free agent

Position	Player	Free agency tag	Date signed	2009 team
RB	Shaun Alexander	Released		
DT	Ryan Boschetti	UFA	April 2	Oakland Raiders
LB	Khary Campbell	UFA		
DE	Phillip Daniels	UFA	April 2	Washington Redskins
FS	Reed Doughty	UFA	March 11	Washington Redskins
DE	Demetric Evans	UFA	March 4	San Francisco 49ers
OG	Jason Fabini	UFA		
LB	Alfred Fincher	UFA	March 10	Washington Redskins
C	Justin Geisinger	UFA	May 1	Carolina Panthers
DE	Kedric Golston	RFA	April 10	Washington Redskins
S	Mike Green	UFA		
CB	DeAngelo Hall	UFA	February 27	Washington Redskins
C	Pete Kendall	UFA		
DE	Anthony Montgomery	RFA	March 25	Washington Redskins
CB	Shawn Springs	Released	March 5	New England Patriots
PK	Shaun Suisham	RFA	March 17	Washington Redskins
OLB	Jason Taylor	Released	May 13	Miami Dolphins
LB	Rian Wallace	UFA		
LB	Marcus Washington	Released		

=== 2009 NFL Draft selections ===
2009 Washington Redskins draft
Round	Pick	Player	Position	College	Notes
1	13	Brian Orakpo *	DE	Texas	
3	80	Kevin Barnes	CB	Maryland	
5	158	Cody Glenn	LB	Nebraska	from Minnesota
6	186	Robert Henson	OLB	TCU	
7	221	Eddie Williams	TE	Idaho	from Washington via Minnesota
7	243	Marko Mitchell	WR	Nevada	Compensatory pick
Made roster * Made at least one Pro Bowl during career

- Washington traded its second-round selection in 2009 (47th overall) and its sixth-round selection in 2010 to Miami for defensive end Jason Taylor on July 20, 2008.
- Washington traded its fourth-round selection in 2009 to the Jets for guard Pete Kendall on August 23, 2007. The selection changed from a fifth-round selection in 2008 because Kendall played 80 percent of the snaps for the Redskins in 2007.
- Washington traded a seventh-round selection to Minnesota for defensive end Erasmus James on May 27, 2008.
- On draft day, Washington traded their original 5th-round selection (150th overall) to the Vikings for the Vikings' 5th-round selection (158th overall) and their seventh-round selection (221st overall) that they originally received from Washington for Erasmus James (see above).

== Personnel ==
=== Staff / Coaches ===
2009 Washington Redskins staff
Front office: Owner – Daniel Snyder; General Manager / Executive VP of Football Operations: Vinny Cerrato (resigned late in the season); General manager / Executive VP of Football Operations: – Bruce Allen (interim); Director of Football Operations – Paul Kelly; Vice president of football administration – Eric Schaffer; Director of player personnel – Scott Campbell; Director of pro personnel – Morocco Brown; Head coaches: Head coach / Quarterbacks – Jim Zorn; Assistant head coach / running backs – Stump Mitchell; Offensive coaches: Offensive coordinator – Sherman Smith; Wide receivers – Stan Hixon; Tight ends – Scott Wachenheim; Assistant Tight Ends Coach - Bill Khayat; Offensive line – Joe Bugel; Offensive assistant – Chris Meidt	Defensive coaches: Defensive coordinator – Greg Blache; Defensive line – John Palmero; Linebackers – Kirk Olivadotti; Defensive Passing Game Coordinator – Steve Jackson; Defensive Quality Control – Chris Garber; Special teams coaches: Special teams coordinator – Danny Smith; Assistant special teams – Richard Hightower; Video Assistant - Bobby Slowik; Strength and conditioning: Strength and conditioning – John Hastings; Strength and conditioning – Bobby Crumpler; Strength and Conditioning Assistant - Harrison Bernstein

=== Final roster ===
2009 Washington Redskins roster
Quarterbacks (QB): 10 Richard Bartel; 17 Jason Campbell; 15 Todd Collins; Running backs (RB): 31 Rock Cartwright; 35 Quinton Ganther; 24 P. J. Hill; 32 Marcus Mason; 45 Mike Sellers FB; Wide receivers (WR): 12 Malcolm Kelly; 84 Marko Mitchell; 89 Santana Moss; 82 Antwaan Randle El; 11 Devin Thomas; Tight ends (TE): 86 Fred Davis; 87 Todd Yoder	Offensive linemen (OL): 66 Derrick Dockery G; 69 Paul Fanaika G; 74 Stephon Heyer T; 76 Levi Jones T; 63 Will Montgomery C/G; 61 Casey Rabach C; 73 William Robinson T; 50 Edwin Williams C/G; Defensive linemen (DL): 79 Lorenzo Alexander DT; 99 Andre Carter DE; 93 Phillip Daniels DE; 64 Kedric Golston DT; 96 Cornelius Griffin DT; 92 Albert Haynesworth DT; 91 Rob Jackson DE; 94 Anthony Montgomery DT; 97 Renaldo Wynn DE	Linebackers (LB): 54 H. B. Blades OLB; 55 Alvin Bowen OLB; 59 London Fletcher MLB; 56 Curtis Gatewood OLB; 51 Robert Henson MLB; 52 Rocky McIntosh OLB; 98 Brian Orakpo OLB; 95 Chris Wilson OLB; Defensive backs (DB): 25 Kevin Barnes CB; 23 DeAngelo Hall CB; 29 Lendy Holmes SS; 30 LaRon Landry FS; 40 Marcus McCauley CB; 41 Kareem Moore FS; 22 Carlos Rogers CB; 27 Fred Smoot CB; 20 Justin Tryon CB; 34 Byron Westbrook CB; Special teams (ST): 67 Ethan Albright LS; 4 Graham Gano K; 3 Hunter Smith P	Practice squad: 39 Anthony Alridge RB; 13 Anthony Armstrong WR; 24 Doug Dutch CB; 38 Jonathan Evans FB; 62 Antoine Holmes DT; 68 Clint Oldenburg OT; 14 James Robinson WR; 72 J. D. Skolnitsky DE; Reserve: 46 Ladell Betts RB (IR); 5 Colt Brennan QB (IR); 47 Chris Cooley TE (IR); 37 Reed Doughty S (IR); 48 Chris Horton S (IR); 90 Jeremy Jarmon DE (IR); 26 Clinton Portis RB (IR); 75 Chad Rinehart G (IR); 60 Chris Samuels T (IR); 77 Randy Thomas G (IR); 36 Eddie Williams FB (IR); 71 Mike Williams T/G (IR); Rookies in italics 53 active, 12 reserve, 8 practice squad

== Schedule ==
=== Preseason ===
Week	Date	Opponent	Result	Record	Venue	Recap
1	August 13	at Baltimore Ravens	L 0–23	0–1	M&T Bank Stadium	Recap
2	August 22	Pittsburgh Steelers	W 17–13	1–1	FedExField	Recap
3	August 28	New England Patriots	L 24–27	1–2	FedExField	Recap
4	September 3	at Jacksonville Jaguars	L 17–24	1–3	Jacksonville Municipal Stadium	Recap

=== Regular season ===
In addition to their regular games with NFC East rivals, the Redskins played teams from the NFC South and AFC West as per the schedule rotation, and also played intraconference games against the Lions and the Rams based on their common divisional position as the Redskins from 2008.

Week	Date	Opponent	Result	Record	Venue	Recap
1	September 13	at New York Giants	L 17–23	0–1	Giants Stadium	Recap
2	September 20	St. Louis Rams	W 9–7	1–1	FedExField	Recap
3	September 27	at Detroit Lions	L 14–19	1–2	Ford Field	Recap
4	October 4	Tampa Bay Buccaneers	W 16–13	2–2	FedExField	Recap
5	October 11	at Carolina Panthers	L 17–20	2–3	Bank of America Stadium	Recap
6	October 18	Kansas City Chiefs	L 6–14	2–4	FedExField	Recap
7	October 26	Philadelphia Eagles	L 17–27	2–5	FedExField	Recap
8	Bye					
9	November 8	at Atlanta Falcons	L 17–31	2–6	Georgia Dome	Recap
10	November 15	Denver Broncos	W 27–17	3–6	FedExField	Recap
11	November 22	at Dallas Cowboys	L 6–7	3–7	Cowboys Stadium	Recap
12	November 29	at Philadelphia Eagles	L 24–27	3–8	Lincoln Financial Field	Recap
13	December 6	New Orleans Saints	L 30–33 (OT)	3–9	FedExField	Recap
14	December 13	at Oakland Raiders	W 34–13	4–9	Oakland–Alameda County Coliseum	Recap
15	December 21	New York Giants	L 12–45	4–10	FedExField	Recap
16	December 27	Dallas Cowboys	L 0–17	4–11	FedExField	Recap
17	January 3	at San Diego Chargers	L 20–23	4–12	Qualcomm Stadium	Recap

== Standings ==
NFC East
	W	L	T	PCT	DIV	CONF	PF	PA	STK
^{(3)} Dallas Cowboys	11	5	0	.688	4–2	9–3	361	250	W3
^{(6)} Philadelphia Eagles	11	5	0	.688	4–2	9–3	429	337	L1
New York Giants	8	8	0	.500	4–2	6–6	402	427	L2
Washington Redskins	4	12	0	.250	0–6	2–10	266	336	L3

== Regular season results ==
=== Week 1: at New York Giants ===
Quarter	1	2	3	4	Total
Redskins	0	7	3	7	17
Giants	3	14	0	6	23

at Giants Stadium, East Rutherford, New Jersey

- Game time: 4:15 PM EDT
- Game weather: 80 °F or 26.7 °C (Sunny)
- Game attendance: 78,206
- Referee: Terry McAulay
- TV announcers (Fox): Joe Buck, Troy Aikman, & Pam Oliver

The Redskins began their season at Giants Stadium for a Week 1 divisional duel with their NFC East rival, the New York Giants. In the first quarter, Washington trailed early as Giants kicker Lawrence Tynes got a 28-yard field goal. In the second quarter, the Redskins' deficit increased as quarterback Eli Manning completed a 30-yard touchdown pass to wide receiver Mario Manningham, along with defensive end Osi Umenyiora stripping quarterback Jason Campbell of the ball and returning the fumble 37 yards for a touchdown. Washington would close out the half with punter Hunter Smith getting an 8-yard touchdown run off of a fake field goal.

The Redskins scored in the third quarter as kicker Shaun Suisham got a 27-yard field goal. However, in the fourth quarter, New York answered with Tynes nailing a 45-yard and a 28-yard field goal. Washington tried to rally as Campbell completed a 17-yard touchdown pass to tight end Chris Cooley, but the Giants' defense proved to be too much to overcome.

With the loss, the Redskins began their season at 0–1.

=== Week 2: vs. St. Louis Rams ===
Quarter	1	2	3	4	Total
Rams	0	7	0	0	7
Redskins	3	3	3	0	9

at FedExField, Landover, Maryland

- Game time: 1:00 PM EDT
- Game weather: 72 °F or 22.2 °C (Sunny)
- Game attendance: 87,780
- Referee: Jerome Boger
- TV announcers (Fox): Sam Rosen & Tim Ryan

The Redskins played their home opener against the St. Louis Rams. Washington scored on a 21-yard field goal in the first quarter and a 28-yard field goal in the second quarter by Shaun Suisham. The Rams would score when quarterback Marc Bulger completed a 2-yard touchdown pass to wide receiver Laurent Robinson. In the third quarter, the Redskins regained their lead when Suisham completed a 23-yard field goal.

With the win, the Redskins improved their record to 1–1.

=== Week 3: at Detroit Lions ===
Quarter	1	2	3	4	Total
Redskins	0	0	7	7	14
Lions	7	6	0	6	19

at Ford Field, Detroit, Michigan

- Game time: 1:00 PM EDT
- Game weather: None (Domed Stadium)
- Game attendance: 40,896
- Referee: Scott Green
- TV announcers (Fox): Thom Brennaman and Brian Billick

The Redskins played the Lions in Detroit. Washington trailed early when Lions quarterback Matthew Stafford completed a 21-yard touchdown pass to wide receiver Bryant Johnson. Detroit increased their lead when kicker Jason Hanson completed 39-yard and 26-yard field goals.

The Redskins scored in the third quarter as quarterback Jason Campbell completed a 57-yard touchdown pass to wide receiver Santana Moss. In the fourth quarter Lions' running back Maurice Morris got a 2-yard touchdown run. Subsequently, the Lions failed a 2-point conversion attempt. Campbell completed a 4-yard touchdown pass to running back Rock Cartwright late in the game, although the Redskins would ultimately lose.

The Lions snapped a 19-game regular season losing streak with the win.

=== Week 4: vs. Tampa Bay Buccaneers ===
Quarter	1	2	3	4	Total
Buccaneers	7	3	0	3	13
Redskins	0	0	16	0	16

at FedExField, Landover, Maryland

- Game time: 1:00 PM EDT
- Game weather: 69 °F or 20.6 °C (Sunny)
- Game attendance: 86,412
- Referee: Ed Hochuli
- TV announcers (Fox): Sam Rosen, Tim Ryan, & Laura Okmin

The Redskins played the Tampa Bay Buccaneers in their fourth regular season game of the year. Washington fumbled early in the game, giving the Buccaneers possession of the ball at the Redskins' 10-yard line. Tampa Bay scored on quarterback Josh Johnson's 8-yard touchdown pass to wide receiver Antonio Bryant in the first quarter. Mike Nugent's 37-yard field goal in the second quarter gave the Buccaneers a 10-point lead.

In the third quarter, the Redskins kicker Shaun Suisham made a 42-yard field goal. Afterwards, Jason Campbell completed a 17-yard touchdown pass to tight end Chris Cooley. The point after was blocked. The Redskins also scored when Campbell threw a 59-yard pass to wide receiver Santana Moss. Nugent successfully kicked a 22-yard field goal in the fourth quarter; setting the final score of Washington 16 to Tampa Bay 13.

Josh Johnson saw his first NFL start. Jason Campbell finished the day with three interceptions and two touchdowns.

=== Week 5: at Carolina Panthers ===
Quarter	1	2	3	4	Total
Redskins	7	3	7	0	17
Panthers	0	2	7	11	20

at Bank of America Stadium, Charlotte, North Carolina

- Game time: 1:00 PM EDT
- Game weather: 70 °F or 21.1 °C (Partly Cloudy)
- Game attendance: 73,487
- Referee: Walt Coleman
- TV announcers (Fox): Thom Brennaman & Brian Billick

The Redskins traveled to Bank of America Stadium to face the Carolina Panthers. Washington scored with quarterback Jason Campbell completing a 10-yard touchdown pass to running back Clinton Portis. The Panthers gained a safety in the second quarter as linebacker Thomas Davis and defensive end Julius Peppers tackled Portis in his end zone for a safety. Afterwards, the Redskins closed out the half with a 38-yard field goal by kicker Shaun Suisham.

Both Washington and Carolina scored touchdowns in the third quarter. The Panthers later scored on a 43-yard field goal from kicker John Kasay and an 8-yard touchdown run from running back Jonathan Stewart (along with Delhomme's 2-point conversion pass to wide receiver Steve Smith).

With the loss, the Redskins fell to 2–3. The Panthers got their first win of the season.

=== Week 6: vs. Kansas City Chiefs ===
Quarter	1	2	3	4	Total
Chiefs	0	3	3	8	14
Redskins	0	0	6	0	6

at FedExField, Landover, Maryland

- Game time: 1:00 PM EDT
- Game weather: 45 °F or 7.2 °C (Cloudy)
- Game attendance: 79,572
- Referee: Tony Corrente
- TV announcers (CBS): Ian Eagle & Rich Gannon

The Redskins returned to Washington to face another winless team, this time the 0–5 Kansas City Chiefs.

In the first quarter, both offenses did not find the end zone; the first quarter ended with no score.

In the second quarter, Chiefs kicker Ryan Succop kicked a 39-yard field goal for the only score of the half. The Redskins drove down the field with two minutes left in the half, but on the last play of the second quarter, quarterback Jason Campbell was intercepted by Chiefs cornerback Brandon Flowers at the Kansas City 3-yard line.

At the start of the second half, Washington coach Jim Zorn elected to go with backup quarterback Todd Collins over Campbell. Collins tossed a 42-yard completion on his first throw of the game. The drive ended with a 40-yard field goal by Shaun Suisham. The Redskins would take the lead with a 28-yard Suisham kick, but Kansas City tied it up with a 46-yard Succop field goal at the end of the third quarter.

In the final period, Ryan Succop put the Chiefs up 12–6 with field goals of 46 and 24 yards, but it was the Chiefs defense that closed the game out for Kansas City, as defensive end Tamba Hali sacked Todd Collins in his own end zone for a safety with under a minute to play.

Washington fell to 2–4, while the Kansas City Chiefs gained their first victory.

=== Week 7: vs. Philadelphia Eagles ===
Quarter	1	2	3	4	Total
Eagles	14	13	0	0	27
Redskins	0	10	0	7	17

at FedExField, Landover, Maryland

- Game time: 8:30 PM EDT
- Game weather: 57 °F or 13.9 °C (Cloudy)
- Game attendance: 88,241
- Referee: Bill Leavy
- TV announcers (ESPN): Mike Tirico, Ron Jaworski, & Jon Gruden

The Redskins stayed at home for an NFC East game with the Philadelphia Eagles on Monday night. Washington trailed early in the first quarter as Eagles wide receiver DeSean Jackson got a 67-yard touchdown run, followed by linebacker Will Witherspoon returning an interception 9 yards for a touchdown. In the second quarter, Philadelphia increased their lead with kicker David Akers completed a 47-yard field goal. Washington scored with quarterback Jason Campbell completing a 2-yard touchdown pass to wide receiver Devin Thomas, but the Eagles countered with a 44-yard field goal and a Jackson 57-yard touchdown pass reception. The Redskins would then end the half with kicker Shaun Suisham making a 47-yard field goal. Washington scored on Campbell's 1-yard touchdown pass to tight end Fred Davis in the fourth quarter.

With the loss, the Redskins went into their bye week at 2–5.

=== Week 9: at Atlanta Falcons ===
Quarter	1	2	3	4	Total
Redskins	0	3	7	7	17
Falcons	14	10	0	7	31

at Georgia Dome, Atlanta, Georgia

- Game time: 1:00 PM EST
- Game weather: None (Domed Stadium)
- Game attendance: 67,982
- Referee: Ron Winter
- TV announcers (Fox): Kenny Albert, Daryl Johnston & Tony Siragusa

The Redskins traveled to the Georgia Dome to play the Atlanta Falcons. Washington trailed in the first quarter as Falcons quarterback Matt Ryan found tight end Tony Gonzalez on a 2-yard touchdown pass, followed by cornerback Tye Hill returning an interception 62 yards for a touchdown. In the second quarter, the Redskins scored on a 48-yard field goal from Shaun Suisham. However, Atlanta would respond with running back Michael Turner gaining a touchdown and kicker Jason Elam completing a field goal.

Washington scored in the third quarter when running back Ladell Betts completed a 1-yard touchdown run. The Redskins also scored in the fourth quarter as quarterback Jason Campbell completed a 3-yard touchdown pass to tight end Todd Yoder. The Falcons ended the game with a 58-yard touchdown run by Turner.

=== Week 10: vs. Denver Broncos ===
Quarter	1	2	3	4	Total
Broncos	14	3	0	0	17
Redskins	7	7	0	13	27

at FedExField, Landover, Maryland

- Game time: 1:00 PM EST
- Game weather: 72 °F or 22.2 °C (Sunny)
- Game attendance: 85,247
- Referee: Pete Morelli
- TV announcers (CBS): Greg Gumbel & Dan Dierdorf

Trying to snap a four-game losing streak, the Redskins went home for a Week 10 interconference duel with the Denver Broncos. Washington would trail early in the first quarter as Broncos quarterback Kyle Orton completed a 40-yard touchdown pass to wide receiver Brandon Marshall. The Redskins would answer with quarterback Jason Campbell's 2-yard touchdown pass to tight end Todd Yoder, but Denver came right back with Orton hooking up with Marshall again on a 75-yard touchdown pass. In the second quarter, Washington would tie the game with a trick play, as punter Hunter Smith threw a 35-yard touchdown pass to fullback Mike Sellers. The Broncos would close out the half with kicker Matt Prater getting a 24-yard field goal. After a scoreless third quarter, the Redskins would take command in the fourth quarter with running back Ladell Betts getting a 1-yard touchdown run and kicker Shaun Suisham booting a 35-yard field goal.

With the win, the Redskins improved to 3–6.

=== Week 11: at Dallas Cowboys ===
Quarter	1	2	3	4	Total
Redskins	0	3	3	0	6
Cowboys	0	0	0	7	7

at Cowboys Stadium, Arlington, Texas

- Game time: 1:00 PM EST
- Game weather: None (retractable roof closed)
- Game attendance: 85,277
- Referee: Alberto Riveron
- TV announcers (Fox): Joe Buck, Troy Aikman & Pam Oliver

Coming off their win over the Broncos, the Redskins flew to Cowboys Stadium for their Week 11 NFC East rivalry match against the Dallas Cowboys. After a scoreless first quarter, Washington would strike in the second quarter as kicker Shaun Suisham nailed a 45-yard field goal. The Redskins would add onto their lead in the third quarter with Suisham booting a 31-yard field goal. However, in the fourth quarter, the Cowboys rallied as quarterback Tony Romo completing a 10-yard touchdown pass to wide receiver Patrick Crayton.

With the loss, Washington fell to 3–7.

=== Week 12: at Philadelphia Eagles ===
Quarter	1	2	3	4	Total
Redskins	7	7	7	3	24
Eagles	10	6	0	11	27

at Lincoln Financial Field, Philadelphia, Pennsylvania

- Game time: 1:00 PM EST
- Game weather: 59 °F or 15 °C (Sunny)
- Game attendance: 69,144
- Referee: Gene Steratore
- TV announcers (Fox): Kenny Albert, Daryl Johnston & Tony Siragusa

Coming off their Road Loss to the Cowboys. The Washington Redskins flew to Lincoln Financial Field for Week 12 to take on their NFC East Rival the Philadelphia Eagles. In the First Quarter After an Onside Kick Recovery by Washington. The Redskins strike first with QB Jason Campbell running a 2-yard Touchdown. While David Akers connected a 29-yard Field Goal, Later The Eagles took the lead with a 35-yard pass from Donovan McNabb to WR DeSean Jackson. In the 2nd Quarter The Redskins retake the Lead with Jason Campbell completing a 4-yard Touchdown pass to Santana Moss. Then Akers kicked a 24 and a 41-yard Field goal before the half. In the 3rd quarter the Redskins got the lead again completing another Touchdown pass to TE Fred Davis for 10 yards. In the 4th quarter after Shaun Suisham kick a 25-yard Field goal, The Eagles come right back with a 1-yard Touchdown by RB Eldra Buckley (with a 2-point conversion attempt by LeSean McCoy) to tie the game. Later, David Akers kick a 32-yard Field Goal.

With the Loss, Washington falls to 3–8

=== Week 13: vs. New Orleans Saints ===
Quarter	1	2	3	4	OT	Total
Saints	0	17	3	10	3	33
Redskins	10	7	10	3	0	30

at FedExField, Landover, Maryland

- Game time: 1:00 PM EST
- Game weather: 36 °F or 2.2 °C (Mostly Sunny)
- Game attendance: 84,520
- Referee: Carl Cheffers
- TV announcers (Fox): Sam Rosen, Tim Ryan & Nischelle Turner

Trying to rebound after their close heartbreaking road loss against The Philadelphia Eagles. The Redskins traveled home for a week 13 matchup against the Saints. In the first quarter, Washington drew first blood with Jason Campbell throwing an 8-yard touchdown pass to Fred Davis. Later, Shaun Suisham kicked a 32-yard field goal. In the second quarter, the Saints got on the board with Garrett Hartley making a 34-yard field goal, while Drew Brees on the Saints next possession struck a 40-yard touchdown pass to Marques Colston to tie the game. The Redskins then retook the lead with Campbell completing another touchdown pass to Devin Thomas for 10 yards. Along with Robert Meachem returning a 44-yard fumble for a touchdown (which Kareem Moore had an interception). In the 3rd quarter, the Redskins kicker Suisham made a 28-yard field goal. On their next possession, the Redskins extended their lead when Devin Thomas caught a 13-yard touchdown pass from Campbell. Then Garrett Hartley kicked a 27-yard field goal. In the 4th quarter, both Shaun Suisham & Garrett Hartley traded field goals, but then the Saints tied the game late when Drew Brees launched a 53-yard touchdown pass to Robert Meachem sending the game into Overtime. The Redskins won the coin toss, but Mike Sellers fumbled the ball and the Saints gained possession in Redskins territory. After a few plays, Hartley gave the Saints the overtime victory by kicking an 18-yard field goal to end the game.

With the loss, the Redskins fell to 3–9 and were officially eliminated from postseason contention.

=== Week 14: at Oakland Raiders ===
Quarter	1	2	3	4	Total
Redskins	7	10	0	17	34
Raiders	3	7	3	0	13

at Oakland–Alameda County Coliseum, Oakland, California

- Game time: 4:05 PM EST
- Game weather: 52 °F or 11.1 °C (Rain)
- Game attendance: 44,506
- Referee: Walt Anderson
- TV announcers (Fox): Dick Stockton & Charles Davis

Washington entered the Oakland–Alameda County Coliseum seeking to beat the Raiders and finally earn their first road win of 2009. In the 1st quarter the Raiders scored first when K Sebastian Janikowski hit a 34-yard Field Goal. The Redskins took the lead when QB Jason Campbell found TE Fred Davis for a 6-yard Touchdown Pass. In the 2nd quarter the Raiders took the lead with RB Justin Fargas getting a 1-yard TD run. After Redskins K Graham Gano kicked a 46-yard Field Goal. the Redskins took the lead before halftime when Campbell completed his second TD pass to Davis, this time from 17 yards out. Meanwhile, in the 3rd quarter when the Raiders Only Score was Sebastian Janikowski kicking a 54-yard field goal. In the 4th quarter the Redskins extended the Lead with Quinton Ganther scoring back to back possessions on two 1-yard TD runs. While Gano nailed a 41-yard field goal to seal the win for the Redskins.

With the win, Washington not only improved to 4–9, but also won their first road game of the season.

=== Week 15: vs. New York Giants ===
Quarter	1	2	3	4	Total
Giants	7	17	14	7	45
Redskins	0	0	12	0	12

at FedExField, Landover, Maryland

- Game time: 8:30 PM EST
- Game weather: 38 °F or 3.3 °C (Cloudy)
- Game attendance: 78,359
- Referee: Walt Coleman
- TV announcers (ESPN): Mike Tirico, Ron Jaworski & Jon Gruden

Looking to muster their first winning streak of the season, the Washington Redskins took on the rival New York Giants on Monday Night Football. To add to the fanfare, Redskins owner Daniel Snyder hired Bruce Allen to be the new general manager. However, the Redskins came out flat, and trailed 24–0 by halftime. With a chance to kick a field goal as the half ended to cut it to a 24–3 deficit, the Redskins tried one of the most ill-advised and ill-fated fake field goal attempts of all-time. Redskins P Hunter Smith sent the entire offensive line in motion, along with K Graham Gano. The first attempt was foiled by a Giants time-out. The second attempt was intercepted and almost taken back for a 31–0 lead. In the 2nd half, the Redskins finally got on the board, scoring on a touchdown pass to Fred Davis. However, it was too little, too late, as K Graham Gano missed the extra point. The Redskins would not score again until it was 38–6 Giants. RB Quinton Ganther scored on a 2-yard scamper, but the Redskins came up a foot short on the 2-point conversion, which sealed any slim chance there was of a comeback. When all was said and done, the Giants won 45–12.

With the crushing loss, Washington fell to 4–10, losing ten games or more for the third time in six seasons.

=== Week 16: vs. Dallas Cowboys ===
Quarter	1	2	3	4	Total
Cowboys	7	7	0	3	17
Redskins	0	0	0	0	0

at FedExField, Landover, Maryland

- Game time: 8:20 PM EST
- Game weather: 37 °F or 2.8 °C (Partly Clear)
- Game attendance: 88,221
- Referee: John Parry
- TV announcers (NBC): Al Michaels, Cris Collinsworth & Andrea Kremer

Trying to win an NFC East game this season. The Washington Redskins stayed home for a Week 16 Showdown against the Dallas Cowboys. In the First Quarter the Cowboys Strike first with Tony Romo throwing a 4-yard Touchdown Pass to Roy Williams. In the Second Quarter Dallas Struck again with Marion Barber running a 3-yard Touchdown. While in the 4th quarter Shaun Suisham made a 23-yard Field Goal.

With the loss, Washington not only fell to 4–11, but failed to win a single game within their division (0–6), failed to win consecutive games in a season for the first time since 2004, and had their first shutout loss since October 30, 2005 to the Giants 0–36, and their first home shutout loss since December 14, 2003, also to the Cowboys.

=== Week 17: at San Diego Chargers ===
Quarter	1	2	3	4	Total
Redskins	0	14	3	3	20
Chargers	10	3	0	10	23

at Qualcomm Stadium, San Diego, California

- Game time: 4:15 PM EST
- Game weather: 75 °F or 23.9 °C (sunny)
- Game attendance: 67,554
- Referee: Jeff Triplette
- TV announcers (Fox): Ron Pitts, John Lynch and Nischelle Turner

Coming off their shutout loss against the Cowboys, the Washington Redskins traveled to Qualcomm Stadium for a week-17 match-up against The San Diego Chargers. In the first quarter, The Chargers scored first with Nate Kaeding kicking a 47-yard field goal. Following the Chargers Next possession extended their Lead with Antonio Gates catching a 12-yard pass from Philip Rivers for a 10–0 lead. In the 2nd quarter the Chargers Continue to Roll with Nate Keading kicking a 24-yard Field Goal but The Redskins get on the Board with Jason Campbell throwing a 2-yard touchdown pass to Todd Yoder. Meanwhile, Before halftime after a long pass from Jason Campbell to WR Malcolm Kelly which would've been his first TD as a Redskin this season. the Redskins take the Lead with Jason Campbell completing a 3-yard touchdown to Mike Sellers. In the 3rd and fourth quarter Both Graham Gano and Nate Keading traded Field Goals apiece. While the Chargers set up a 2-yard game-winning touchdown from Billy Volek to Mike Tolbert.

With the loss, Washington ended the season at 4–12.

== Statistics ==
=== Passing ===
Player	G	QB Rat.	Comp.	Att.	Pct.	Yards	TD	INT	Long	Sack
Jason Campbell	16	86.4	327	507	64.5	3,618	20	15	84	43
Todd Collins	3	71.6	12	23	52.2	87	0	0	46	2
Hunter Smith	13	95.8	1	2	50.0	35	1	1	35	0
Clinton Portis	8	39.6	0	1	0.0	0	0	0	0	0

=== Rushing ===
Player	G	Att.	Yards	Y/G	Avg.	Long	TD	Fum	FumL
Clinton Portis	8	124	494	61.8	4.0	78	1	1	1
Rock Cartwright	13	59	212	16.3	3.6	34	0	0	0
Ladell Betts	10	56	210	21.0	3.8	18	2	0	0
Jason Campbell	13	38	179	13.8	4.7	21	1	8	3
Quinton Ganther	5	33	138	27.6	4.2	13	2	0	0
Marcus Mason	7	18	65	9.3	3.6	12	0	0	0
Santana Moss	13	2	8	0.6	4.0	6	0	2	1
Hunter Smith	10	1	8	0.8	8.0	8	1	0	0
Todd Collins	4	1	0	0.0	0.0	5	0	2	0
Devin Thomas	13	3	−2	−0.2	−0.7	2	0	2	0

=== Receiving ===
Player	G	Rec.	Yards	Y/G	Avg.	Long	TD
Santana Moss	16	70	902	56.4	12.9	59	3
Antwaan Randle El	16	50	530	33.1	10.6	44	0
Fred Davis	16	48	509	31.8	10.6	29	6
Chris Cooley	7	29	332	47.4	11.4	25	2
Rock Cartwright	16	27	242	15.1	9	51	1
Malcolm Kelly	16	25	347	21.7	13.9	84	0
Devin Thomas	14	25	325	23.2	13.0	40	3
Ladell Betts	10	17	179	17.9	10.5	25	0
Mike Sellers	15	17	176	11.7	10.4	47	2
Quinton Ganther	8	9	99	12.4	11	42	0
Clinton Portis	8	9	57	7.1	6.3	10	1
Marcus Mason	10	6	58	5.8	9.7	11	0
Marko Mitchell	10	4	32	3.2	8.0	11	0
Todd Yoder	16	4	9	0.6	2.3	3	3

=== Kicking ===
Player	G	0–19	20–29	30–39	40–49	50+	FGM	FGA	Pct.	Long	XPM	XPA
Shaun Suisham	12	0–0	8–9	5–6	5–5	0–1	18	21	84.0	50	20	21
Graham Gano	4	0–0	2–2	0–0	2–2	0–0	4	4	100.0	46	6	7

=== Punting ===
Player	G	Punt	Yards	Avg.	In20	In10	TB	Long
Hunter Smith	13	57	2,356	41.3	23	3	5	59
Glenn Pakulak	2	13	498	38.3	4	1	1	57
Sam Paulescu	1	3	150	50.0	0	0	0	53
Shaun Suisham	12	3	80	26.7	1	0	0	32

=== Defense ===
Player	G	Tackles	Asst.	TotalTK	Sack	YdL	INT	Yards	TD	FumR
London Fletcher	13	76	42	118	2.0	2	1	2	0	0
Reed Doughty	13	68	11	82	2.0	8	0	0	0	0
LaRon Landry	13	64	9	73	1.0	11	1	12	0	0
Rocky McIntosh	13	53	19	72	0.0	0	1	18	0	0
Andre Carter	13	45	12	57	11.0	63	0	0	0	0
Brian Orakpo	13	34	12	46	11.0	84	0	0	0	0
DeAngelo Hall	10	32	11	43	0.0	0	4	114	0	0
Chris Horton	8	28	9	37	0.0	0	0	0	0	0
Carlos Rogers	13	29	2	31	0.0	0	0	0	0	0
Phillip Daniels	13	18	11	29	0.0	0	0	0	0	0
Albert Haynesworth	10	23	6	29	3.0	19	0	0	0	0
H.B. Blades	13	22	1	28	0.0	0	0	0	0	0
Cornelius Griffin	12	16	11	27	2.0	12	0	0	0	0
Kedric Golston	13	16	9	25	1.0	0	0	0	0	0
Fred Smoot	12	17	4	21	0.0	0	0	0	0	0
Justin Tryon	12	17	4	21	1.0	4	1	3	0	0
Kareem Moore	13	13	4	17	0.0	0	1	14	0	0
Lorenzo Alexander	13	14	2	16	1.0	9	0	0	0	0
Chris Wilson	13	11	3	14	1.0	9	0	0	0	0
Byron Westbrook	12	10	1	11	0.0	9	1	0	0	0
Mike Sellers	12	7	3	10	0.0	0	0	0	0	0
Jeremy Jarmon	11	6	2	8	0.0	0	0	0	0	0
Rock Cartwright	13	3	4	7	0.0	0	0	0	0	0
Devin Thomas	13	5	0	5	0.0	0	0	0	0	0
Todd Yoder	13	2	1	3	0.0	0	0	0	0	0
Antwaan Randle El	13	3	0	3	0.0	0	0	0	0	0
Kevin Barnes	3	2	0	2	0.0	0	0	0	0	0
Stephon Heyer	13	2	0	2	0.0	0	0	0	0	0
Derrick Dockery	13	2	0	2	0.0	0	0	0	0	0
Quinton Ganther	5	2	0	2	0.0	0	0	0	0	0
Anthony Montgomery	4	2	0	2	0.0	0	0	0	0	0
Santana Moss	13	2	0	2	0.0	0	0	0	0	0
Fred Davis	13	1	0	1	0.0	0	0	0	0	0
Lendy Holmes	5	1	0	1	0.0	0	0	0	0	0
Casey Rabach	13	1	0	1	0.0	0	0	0	0	0
Ladell Betts	10	1	0	1	0.0	0	0	0	0	0
Robert Henson	3	1	0	1	0.0	0	0	0	0	0
Rob Jackson	2	1	0	1	0.0	0	0	0	0	0
