= London Fletcher =

American football player (born 1975)

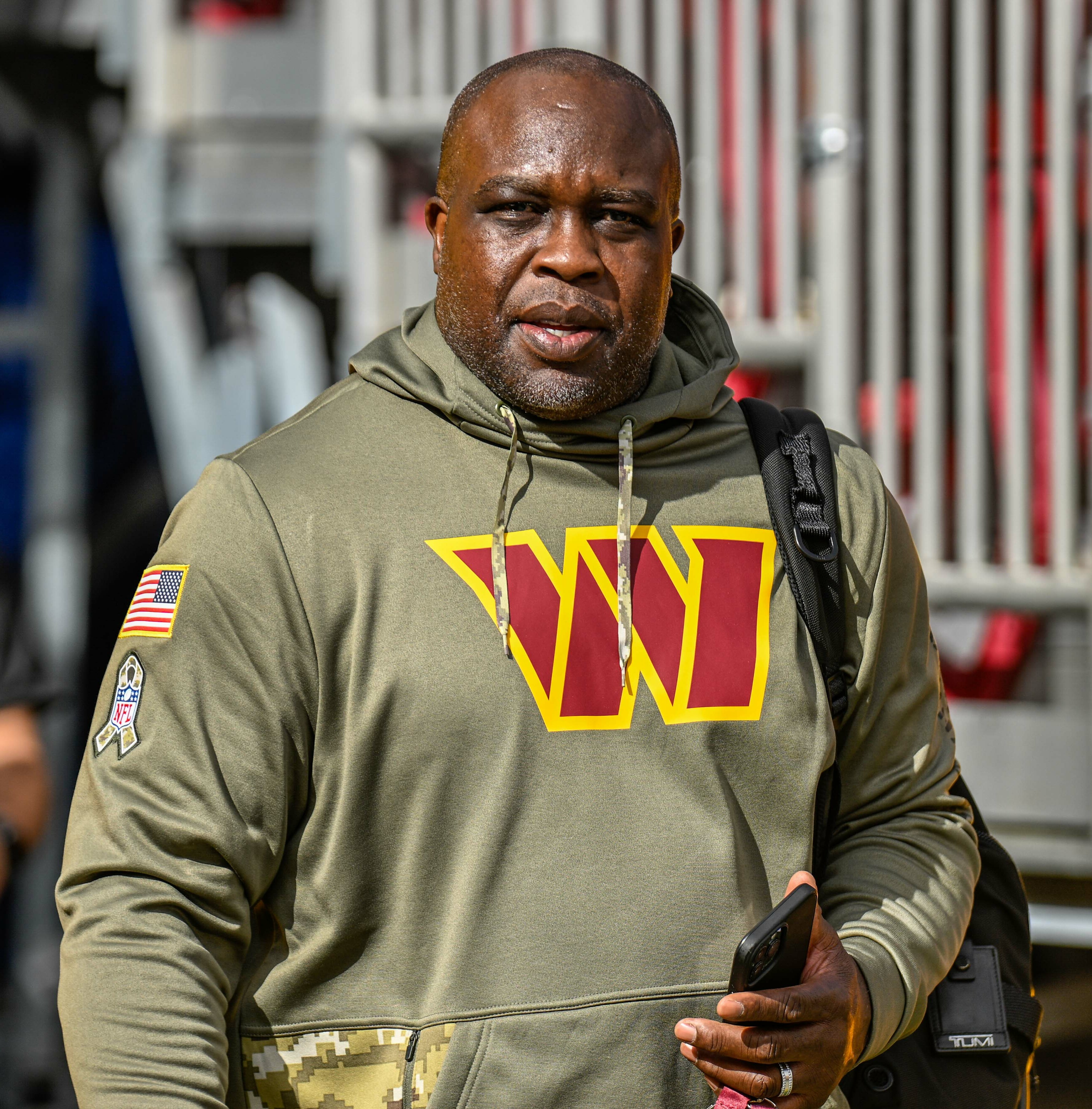
- Fletcher in 2022

No. 59
- Position: Linebacker

Personal information
- Born: May 19, 1975 (age 51); Cleveland, Ohio, U.S.
- Listed height: 5 ft 10 in (1.78 m)
- Listed weight: 242 lb (110 kg)

Career information
- High school: Villa Angela-St. Joseph (Cleveland)
- College: Saint Francis (1993–1994); John Carroll (1995–1997)
- NFL draft: 1998: undrafted

Career history
- St. Louis Rams (1998–2001); Buffalo Bills (2002–2006); Washington Redskins (2007–2013)

Awards and highlights
- Super Bowl champion (XXXIV); 2× Second-team All-Pro (2011, 2012); 4× Pro Bowl (2009–2012); NFL combined tackles leader (2011); Washington Commanders Ring of Fame; 90 Greatest Commanders; Washington DC Sports Hall of Fame (2026); NCAA Division III Linebacker of the Year (1997); NCAA Division III unanimous All-American (1997); NCAA Division III first-team All-American (1996); OAC Linebacker of the Year (1997); 2× First-team All-OAC (1996, 1997); John Carroll Blue Streaks No. 3 retired

Career NFL statistics
- Tackles: 2,032
- Sacks: 39.0
- Forced fumbles: 19
- Fumble recoveries: 12
- Interceptions: 23
- Touchdowns: 3
- Stats at Pro Football Reference
- College Football Hall of Fame

London Levi Fletcher-Baker (born May 19, 1975) is an American former professional football player who was a linebacker for 16 seasons in the National Football League (NFL). He played college football for the John Carroll Blue Streaks and signed with the St. Louis Rams as an undrafted free agent in 1998. After four seasons with the Rams, he was a member of the Buffalo Bills for five seasons and spent his last seven seasons with the Washington Redskins. He won Super Bowl XXXIV with the Rams in 1999 and made four Pro Bowls during his Redskins tenure.

Fletcher never missed a game due to injury in his career, being one of only five players in NFL history to play in over 250 consecutive games and holding the record for most consecutive starts at linebacker. He finished his career with 215 consecutive games started, which ties him for seventh all-time along with Alan Page and Ronde Barber. He was inducted into the Washington Commanders Ring of Fame in 2019 and joined the team's radio broadcast crew in 2022. He currently serves as the color commentator for the Commanders' radio broadcasts.

== Early life ==
Fletcher attended Villa Angela-St. Joseph High School in Cleveland, Ohio, and won varsity letters in football and basketball. He played on two state championship basketball teams. In 2015, he was inducted into the school's Hall of Champions.

== College career ==
Fletcher played Division I basketball on a scholarship at Saint Francis University for one season before transferring to John Carroll University in 1995. While attending John Carroll, he played both basketball and football for the John Carroll Blue Streaks. As a senior in 1997, he recorded a school-record 202 tackles and also holds the program's single-game tackles record with 29, helping lead the program to its first NCAA Division III playoff victory. He was named the Division III National Linebacker of the Year, Ohio Athletic Conference Linebacker of the Year, and was a two-time first-team All-American and two-time first-team All-Ohio Athletic Conference selection in 1996 and 1997.

Fletcher later became the first player from John Carroll University to be inducted into the College Football Hall of Fame, and his No. 3 jersey was retired by the school in 2017.

== Professional career ==
Fletcher attended the NFL Scouting Combine and ran a 4.38 in the 40-yard dash. He worked out for several NFL teams and was expected to be a day 2 selection, but was not one of the 30 linebackers drafted during the 1998 NFL draft.

=== St. Louis Rams ===
==== 1998 ====
On April 28, 1998, the St. Louis Rams signed Fletcher to a one-year, $158,000 contract as an undrafted free agent. He made his professional regular season debut in the St. Louis Rams’ season-opening 24–17 loss against the New Orleans Saints. On December 27, 1998, Fletcher earned his first career start after Eric Hill sustained an injury. He made eight solo tackles on defense and seven special teams tackles as the Rams lost 38–19 at the San Francisco 49ers in a Week 17. Fletcher earned the Rams Rookie of the Year Award. He finished the season with 14 combined tackles (11 solo) in 16 games and one start.

==== 1999 ====
Throughout training camp, Fletcher competed against Charlie Clemons and Lorenzo Styles to be the starting middle linebacker after the Rams chose not to re-sign Eric Hill. Head coach Dick Vermeil named Fletcher the starting middle linebacker to begin the regular season, alongside outside linebacker Todd Collins and Mike Jones.

On October 3, 1999, Fletcher collected a season-high 11 combined tackles (nine solo) and made his first career sack during a 38–10 win at the Cincinnati Bengals in Week 3. Fletcher sacked Bengals’ quarterback Jeff Blake for a ten-yard loss during the third quarter. In Week 9, Fletcher recorded five combined tackles and earned his first career safety during a 31–27 loss at the Detroit Lions. Fletcher earned his safety by tackling running back Greg Hill in the endzone for a one-yard loss during the first quarter. Fletcher started in all 16 games in 1999 and recorded a total of 138 tackles on defense and special teams combined. His 138 tackles were the most by a Ram since Roman Phifer collected 149 tackles in 1995. Fletcher recorded 90 combined tackles (66 solo), with three sacks, and one safety on defense.

The St. Louis Rams finished first in the NFC West with a 13–3 record and earned a first round bye. On January 16, 2000, Fletcher started in his first career playoff game and recorded 11 combined tackles (eight solo) and made one sack during a 49–37 victory against the Minnesota Vikings in the NFC Divisional Round. The following week, he made nine combined tackles as the Rams defeated the Tampa Bay Buccaneers 11–6 in the NFC Championship Game. On January 30, 2000, Fletcher started in Super Bowl XXXIV and recorded 11 combined tackles (nine solo) as the Rams defeated the Tennessee Titans 23–16. He also was named to the All-Madden team and as a second alternate to the Pro Bowl for the first time.

==== 2000 ====
On February 2, 2000, St. Louis Rams’ head coach Dick Vermeil announced his decision to retire. The St. Louis Rams promoted offensive coordinator Mike Martz to head coach. Martz retained Fletcher, Collins, and Jones as the starting linebackers. He started in the St. Louis Rams’ opener against the Denver Broncos and collected a season-high 14 combined tackles (nine solo) and made two sacks during their 41–36 victory. On November 12, 2000, Fletcher made six solo tackles, forced a fumble, and made his first career interception during a 38–24 at the New York Giants in Week 11. Fletcher intercepted a pass by Giants’ Kerry Collins, that was intended for wide receiver Ike Hilliard, and returned it for a 12-yard gain during the third quarter. In Week 13, Fletcher recorded seven combined tackles, was credited with half a sack, and made a season-high two interceptions during a 31–24 loss against the New Orleans Saints. He made both interceptions off pass attempts by Saints’ quarterback Aaron Brooks. In Week 15, he recorded ten combined tackles (nine solo) and two sacks during a 40–29 victory against the Minnesota Vikings. His performance earned him NFC Defensive Player of the Week honors. He led the team with 193 tackles on defense and special teams, eclipsing the old franchise mark of 185 set by LB Jim Collins in 1984. Fletcher recorded 132 combined tackles (105 solo) solely on defense and made four interceptions and 5.5 sacks in 16 games and 15 starts.

==== 2001 ====
In 2001, Fletcher earned NFC Defensive Player of the Week honors twice and was an alternate to the pro bowl for the third straight season. In a game against the San Francisco 49ers on September 23, he led the team with a career-high 21 tackles, 15 solo. The second time was after his big performance against the New England Patriots on November 18 as he led the team with 17 tackles with one pass deflection. He forced a fumble on the Rams’ three-yard line that led to a 97-yard scoring drive to end the first half and intercepted a Tom Brady pass with 5:18 left in the third quarter for an 18-yard return. This season, the Rams made the Super Bowl XXXVI but were defeated by the Patriots 20–17, after kicker Adam Vinatieri made a game-winning 48-yard field goal as time expired.

=== Buffalo Bills ===
On March 6, 2002, the Buffalo Bills signed Fletcher to a five-year, $17.12 million contract that included a signing bonus of $4 million.

Starting in 2002, Fletcher started all 16 regular season games for the Bills until his last season in 2006, when he recorded a team-high 157 tackles, including nine for loss, set a career-high with 14 deflections and tied a career-high with four interceptions. On September 10, in the first regular season game, Fletcher scored his first career touchdown after recovering a fumble by the Patriots' Tom Brady and returning it five yards for a touchdown only 12 seconds into the game. Fletcher was named a 2007 Pro Bowl alternate in his last season as a member of the Bills.

=== Washington Redskins ===
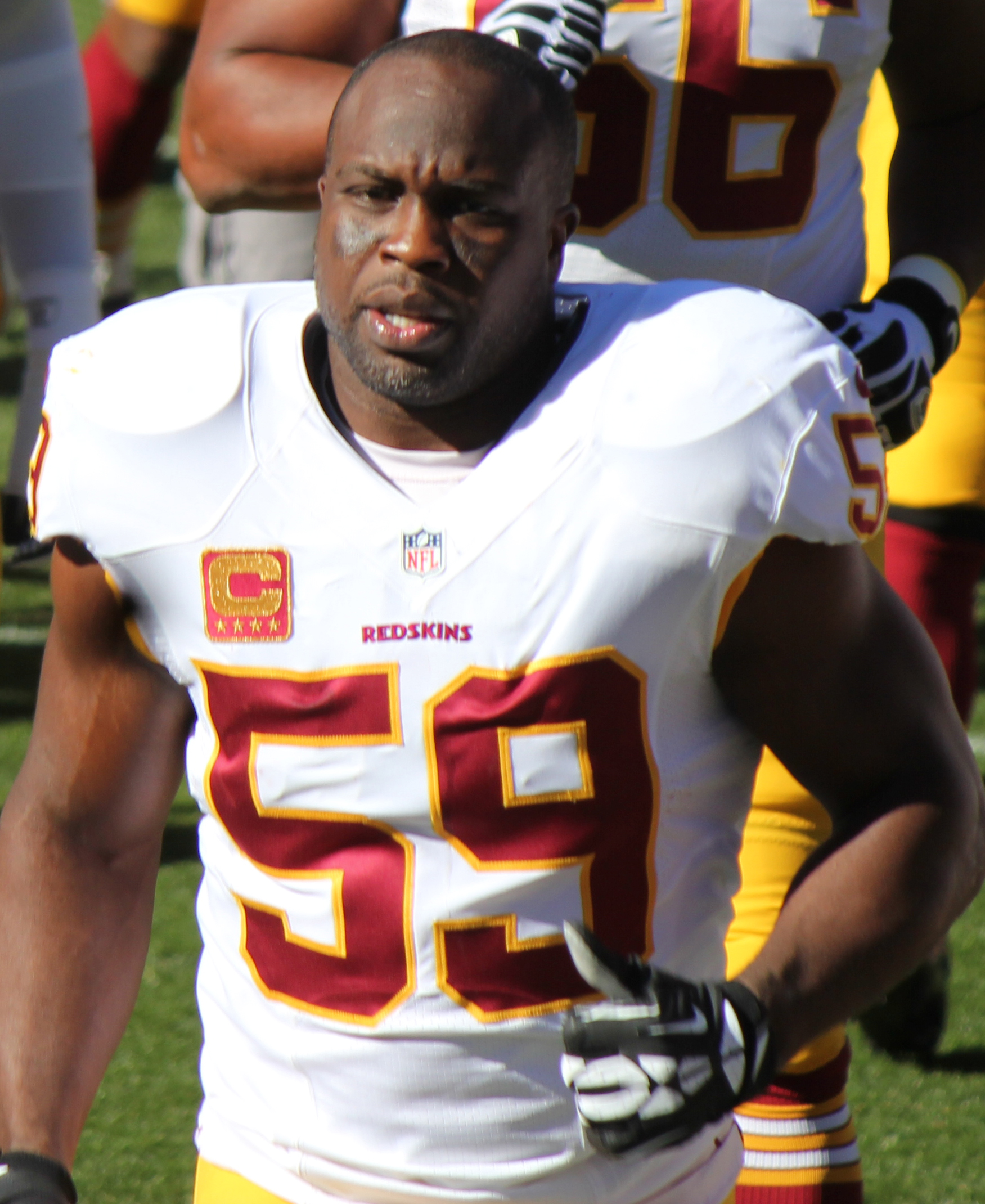
Fletcher in 2013

On March 2, 2007, Fletcher signed with the Washington Redskins to a five-year, $25 million contract. He immediately became the team's starting middle linebacker. With his first season on the team, he was named co-winner of the B.J. Blanchard Award, an honor given annually to a Redskins player who best helps the local media do their jobs, along with quarterback Jason Campbell. Fletcher continued his Pro Bowl-caliber run with the Redskins in 2008.

"I think he's one of the most underrated players in the league. Pound for pound, you can't measure the way he plays and what he means to that team."

— Lawyer Milloy
Former Buffalo Bills’ teammate

He was the Redskins' defensive co-captain for the team from 2008 season until he retired. Also in 2008, the Redskins nominated Fletcher as their Walter Payton Man of the Year Award representative.

Fletcher was named to the NFC squad in the 2010 Pro Bowl after Jonathan Vilma's New Orleans Saints qualified for Super Bowl XLIV, the first Pro Bowl selection in his career. Fletcher was also one of three candidates for the 2009 Walter Payton Man of the Year Award, which was ultimately won by the Kansas City Chiefs's Brian Waters.

After the Redskins' switch to a 3–4 defensive scheme, Fletcher moved from the middle linebacker position to the left inside linebacker for the 2010 season. He made the Pro Bowl for the second consecutive time in 2010, where he had an interception which set up a touchdown for the NFC.

Despite not making the 2012 Pro Bowl starting roster, Fletcher led the entire league in tackles with 166 tackles by the end of the 2011 season. He started all 16 games of the 2011 season and recorded 166 combined tackles, 1.5 sacks, two interceptions, and eight pass breakups. Fletcher, however, did make it as alternate for the 2012 Pro Bowl along with teammates, Brian Orakpo and Lorenzo Alexander. On January 9, 2012, Fletcher was added to the NFC 2012 Pro Bowl roster after Brian Urlacher confirmed that he would not be participating. On January 11, 2012, it was announced that Fletcher won the Bart Starr Award. He was also named the Redskins' 2011 Defensive Player of the Year.

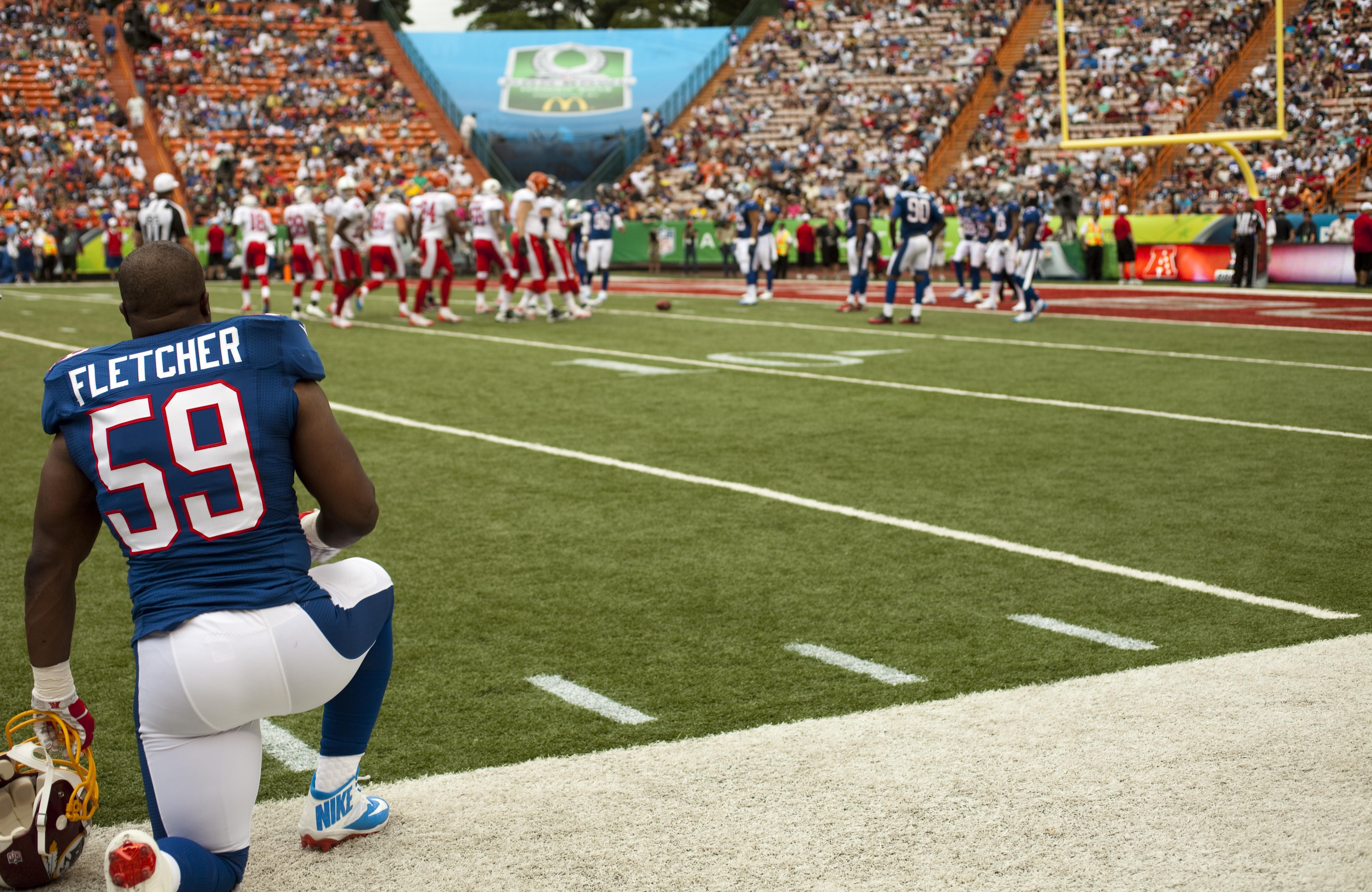
Fletcher on the sidelines at the 2013 Pro Bowl.

On April 13, 2012, Fletcher was re-signed by the Redskins to a two-year contract worth $10.75 million with $5.25 million guaranteed. He was given the 87th ranking in the NFL Network's Top 100 Players of 2012 list. Despite the Redskins' 31–28 loss to the St. Louis Rams in Week 2 of the 2012 season, Fletcher had a stellar performance. In the game, he intercepted quarterback Sam Bradford in the endzone and forced running back Daryl Richardson to fumble in the fourth quarter and the ball was recovered by DeAngelo Hall, which gave the Redskins one last attempt to tie or win the game. In the Week 12 win against the Dallas Cowboys on Thanksgiving, he recorded his second interception for the season making him one of three active NFL players, at that time, to have recorded 20 interceptions and 30 sacks, the other two being Brian Urlacher and Ray Lewis. Fletcher intercepted Joe Flacco in Week 14 against the Baltimore Ravens. He had another interception, against Brandon Weeden, in the Redskins' win over the Cleveland Browns. He finished the season with 139 tackles, three sacks, and a career-high five interceptions.

There was doubt over whether Fletcher would return for the 2013 season until it was announced that he had surgery on his left ankle and was scheduled for elbow surgery to prepare for another season with the Redskins on March 6, 2013. On November 7, Fletcher started his 208th consecutive game, tying the league's all-time record of most starts by a linebacker last held by retired linebacker Derrick Brooks.

On December 18, 2013, Fletcher announced his retirement. Fletcher finished his career having played in 256 consecutive games and starting 215 consecutive games, which is the NFL all-time record of consecutive starts at the linebacker position. He joined Washington's radio broadcast crew in 2022. On September 1, 2022, Fletcher was inducted into Washington's Greatest Players list in honor of the franchise's 90th anniversary.

== Awards and honors ==
=== NFL ===
- Super Bowl champion (XXXIV)
- 2× Second-team All-Pro (2011, 2012)
- 4× Pro Bowl (2009–2012)
- NFL combined tackles leader (2011)
- Bart Starr Award (2012)
- Washington Commanders Ring of Fame (2019)
- 90 Greatest Commanders

=== College ===
- Football Gazette NCAA Division III Linebacker of the Year (1997)
- NCAA Division III unanimous All-American (1997)
- NCAA Division III first-team All-American (1996)
- OAC Linebacker of the Year (1997)
- 2× First-team All-OAC (1996, 1997)
- John Carroll Blue Streaks No. 3 retired

=== Hall of Fame ===
- Washington DC Sports Hall of Fame – Class of 2026
- College Football Hall of Fame – Class of 2019
- John Carroll University Athletics Hall of Fame – Class of 2008
- Villa Angela-St. Joseph High School Hall of Champions – Class of 2015

== NFL career statistics ==
Legend
	Won the Super Bowl
	Led the league
**Bold**	Career high

=== Regular season ===
Year	Team	GP	Tackles				Fumbles			Interceptions					
Year	Team	GP	Comb	Solo	Ast	Sack	FF	FR	Yds	Int	Yds	Avg	Lng	TD	PD
1998	STL	16	14	11	3	0.0	0	0	0	0	0	0	0	0	0
1999	STL	16	90	66	24	3.0	0	0	0	0	0	0	0	0	2
2000	STL	16	132	**105**	27	**5.5**	1	0	0	4	33	8	12	0	8
2001	STL	16	116	89	27	4.5	**4**	0	0	2	18	9	18	0	5
2002	BUF	16	147	97	50	3.0	2	2	20	0	0	0	0	0	2
2003	BUF	16	133	96	37	2.0	0	1	3	0	0	0	0	0	4
2004	BUF	16	142	92	50	3.5	2	1	0	0	0	0	0	0	3
2005	BUF	16	157	104	53	4.0	1	2	0	1	20	**20**	20	0	3
2006	BUF	16	146	104	42	2.0	0	1	5	4	30	8	17	**1**	**11**
2007	WAS	16	129	100	28	0.0	0	1	6	3	**36**	12	**27**	**1**	10
2008	WAS	16	133	96	37	0.5	1	1	12	0	0	0	0	0	6
2009	WAS	16	142	95	47	2.0	1	0	0	1	2	2	2	0	6
2010	WAS	16	136	87	49	2.5	3	**3**	−3	1	0	0	0	0	**11**
2011	WAS	16	**166**	96	**70**	1.5	3	0	0	2	0	0	0	0	8
2012	WAS	16	139	78	61	3.0	1	0	0	**5**	29	6	10	0	**11**
2013	WAS	16	111	63	48	2.0	1	0	0	0	0	0	0	0	2
Career		256	2,032	1,379	653	39.0	20	12	43	23	168	7	27	2	92

=== Postseason ===
Year	Team	GP	Tackles				Fumbles			Interceptions					
Year	Team	GP	Comb	Solo	Ast	Sack	FF	FR	Yds	Int	Yds	Avg	Lng	TD	PD
1999	STL	**3**	**31**	**24**	7	**1.0**	0	0	0	0	0	0	0	0	0
2000	STL	1	8	5	3	0.0	0	0	0	0	0	0	0	0	0
2001	STL	**3**	14	9	5	0.0	0	0	0	0	0	0	0	0	**1**
2007	WAS	1	2	2	0	0.0	0	0	0	0	0	0	0	0	0
2012	WAS	1	15	5	**10**	0.5	0	0	0	0	0	0	0	0	**1**
Career		9	70	45	25	1.5	0	0	0	0	0	0	0	0	2

== Personal life ==
Fletcher and his wife Charne have three children, two daughters, Paige and Brooke, and a son, Steele. Charne died from cancer in September 2024 at the age of 50.

Fletcher is a Christian. Fletcher spoke about his conversion to Christianity saying, "I spent years chasing things I thought would bring me everlasting joy and happiness: chasing Super Bowl rings or a multi-million dollar contract; or a new house, cars and jewelry. None of those things did for me what Christ did in an instant."

Fletcher was named a Pro Bowl alternate 11 times during his career and did not play in his first one until the 2010 Pro Bowl via replacing Jonathan Vilma. As a result, Fletcher called himself the NFL version of Susan Lucci, who won a Daytime Emmy after 19 nominations.
