= Brian Orakpo =

American football player (born 1986)

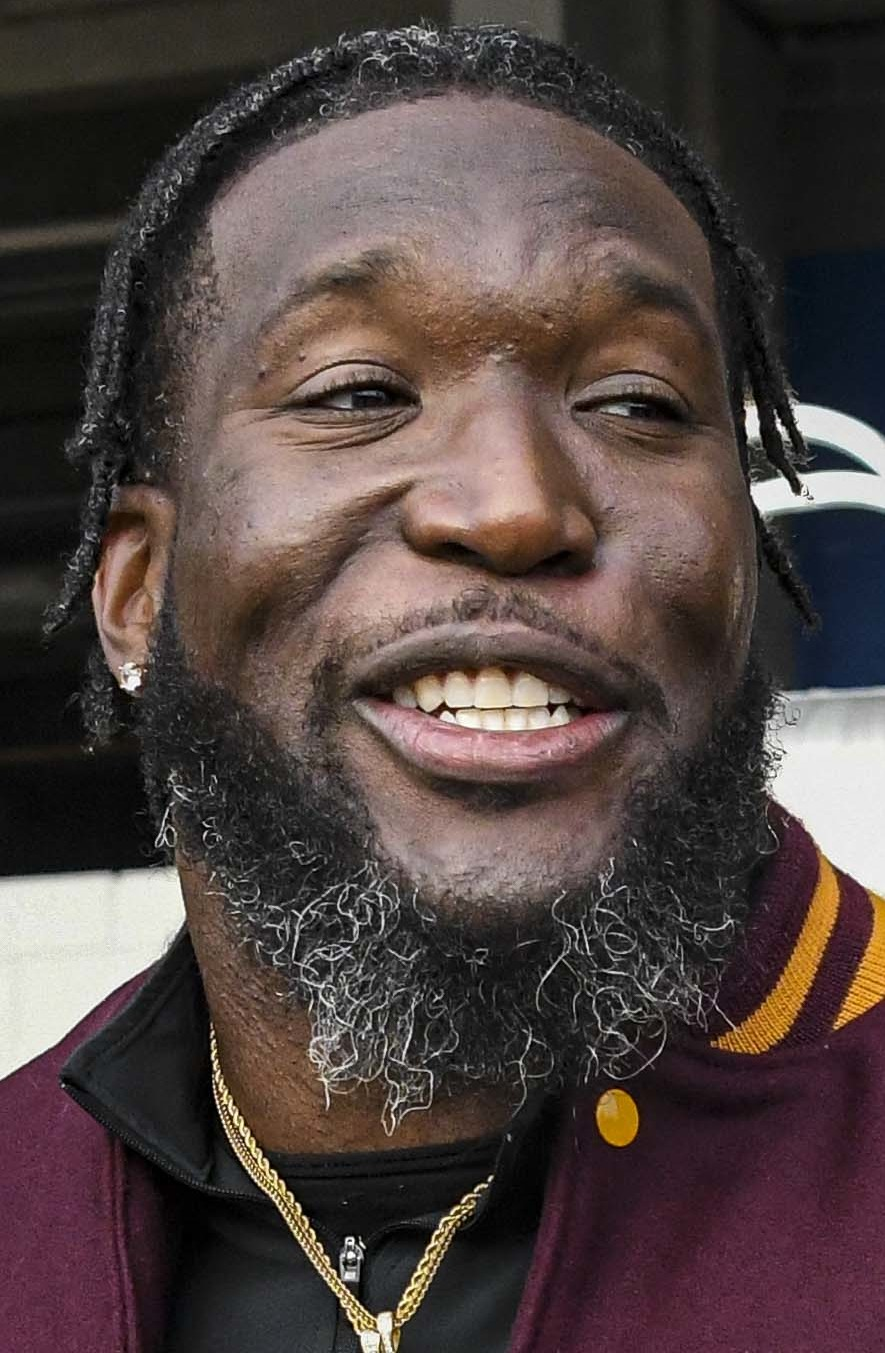
- Orakpo in 2022

No. 98
- Position: Linebacker

Personal information
- Born: July 31, 1986 (age 40); Houston, Texas, U.S.
- Listed height: 6 ft 4 in (1.93 m)
- Listed weight: 257 lb (117 kg)

Career information
- High school: Lamar (Houston)
- College: Texas (2004–2008)
- NFL draft: 2009: 1st round, 13th overall pick

Career history
- Washington Redskins (2009–2014); Tennessee Titans (2015–2018)

Awards and highlights
- 4× Pro Bowl (2009, 2010, 2013, 2016); PFWA All-Rookie Team (2009); BCS national champion (2005); Bronko Nagurski Trophy (2008); Ted Hendricks Award (2008); Lombardi Award (2008); Bill Willis Trophy (2008); Unanimous All-American (2008); Big 12 Defensive Player of the Year (2008); Big 12 Defensive Lineman of the Year (2008); Big 12 Defensive Freshman of the Year (2005); First-team All-Big 12 (2008)

Career NFL statistics
- Total tackles: 396
- Sacks: 66.0
- Forced fumbles: 12
- Interceptions: 1
- Pass deflections: 31
- Defensive touchdowns: 1
- Stats at Pro Football Reference

Brian Ndubisi Orakpo (born July 31, 1986) is an American former professional football player who was a linebacker for 10 seasons in the National Football League (NFL). He played college football for the University of Texas, was recognized as a unanimous All-American, and was selected by the Washington Redskins with the thirteenth overall pick in the 2009 NFL draft. He also played for Tennessee Titans, and was selected to four Pro Bowls.

== Early life ==
Orakpo was born on July 31, 1986, in Houston, Texas to parents Gloria and Arthur Orakpo, who are immigrants from Nigeria. He has two younger siblings, Jennifer and Michael. Orakpo played high school football at Lamar High School in Houston, Texas. He played defensive end and tight end and was a two-time First-team all-district selection for the Texans football team. In addition, he played basketball from his freshman to junior years.

== College career ==
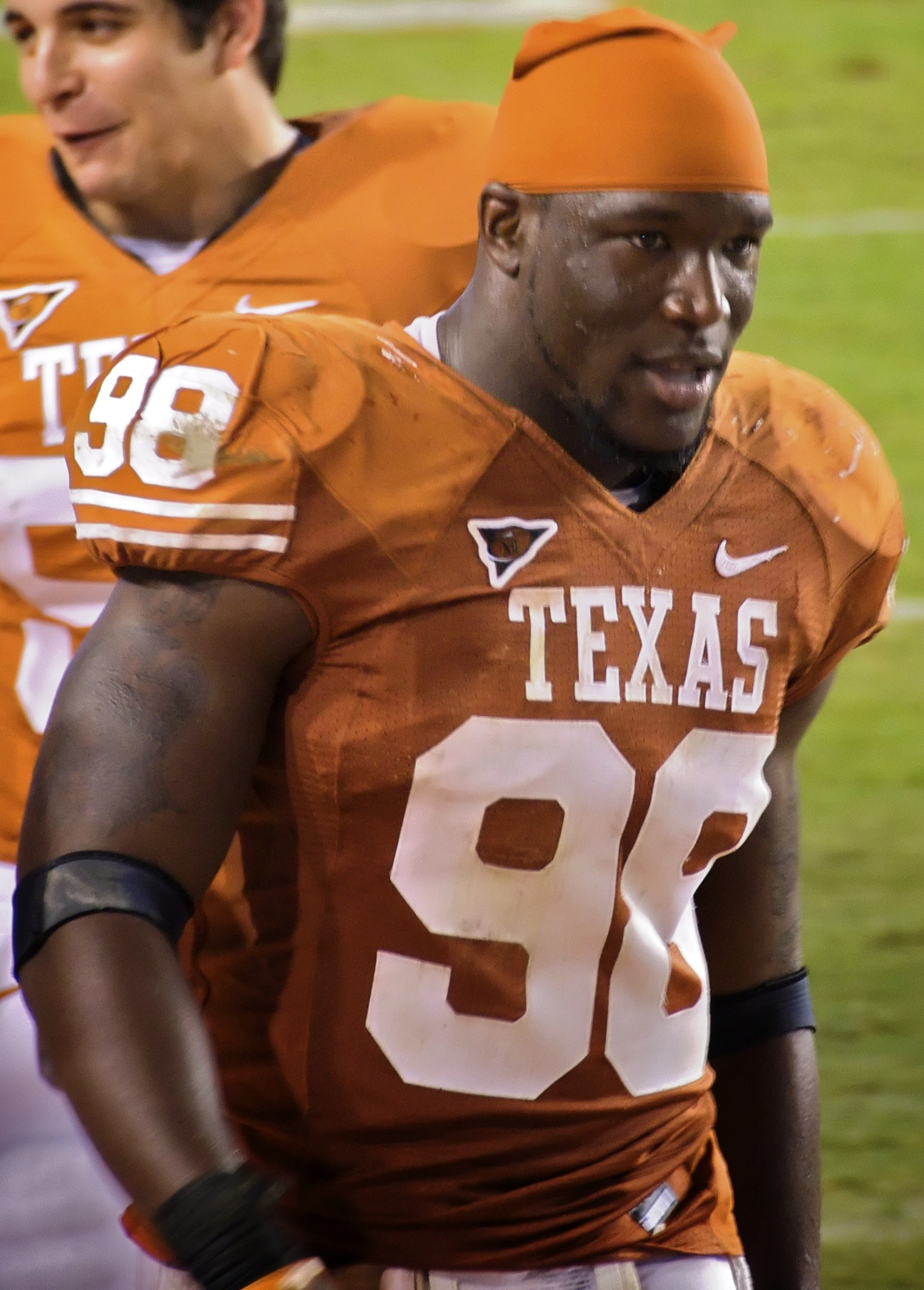
Orakpo as a Texas Longhorn in 2008

Orakpo attended the University of Texas, where he played for coach Mack Brown's Texas Longhorns football team from 2004 to 2008. He was redshirted as a freshman in 2004, but in 2005 he played in all 13 games and started in one. He made an immediate impact for the Longhorns, helping them finish 10th in the nation at defense, recording 27 tackles, a half sack, a forced fumble and recovered fumble. His play earned him Defensive Freshman of the Year and first-team Freshman All-America by The Sporting News. He helped the Longhorns obtain their fourth National Championship.

As a sophomore in 2006, he played all 13 games, recording 26 tackles and 4.5 sacks and was named one of the Lowe's Most Improved Defensive Players. As a junior in 2007, he played in nine games and missed four due to right knee injury suffered against Arkansas State. He was the Defensive MVP of the 2007 Holiday Bowl against Arizona State after recording six tackles and two sacks during the game. He finished the season with 37 tackles and 5.5 sacks.

As a senior in 2008, Orakpo recorded 40 tackles and 11.5 sacks and was the Associated Press Big 12 Defensive Player of the Year. He also was the winner of the Bronko Nagurski Trophy, given to the best defensive player, the Ted Hendricks Award, given to the top defensive end, The Bill Willis Trophy given to the top collegiate defensive lineman, and the Lombardi Award, given to the best lineman or linebacker. He was recognized as a unanimous first-team All-American, after receiving first-team honors from the Associated Press, American Football Coaches Association, Football Writers Association of America, The Sporting News, and the Walter Camp Football Foundation. He was the first Texas Longhorn defensive end to earn All-American honors since Tony Brackens in 1995.

In his college career, Orakpo recorded 132 tackles, 22 sacks, 38 tackles for loss, 62 pressures, six passes broken up, six forced fumbles, and a fumble recovery.

== Professional career ==
Orakpo attended the NFL Combine with much anticipation due to his well-known reputation as a "workout warrior". His 31 reps in the bench press ranked second among all defensive ends and seventh best among all defensive linemen. His 39.5-inch vertical jump was second for all defensive lineman, and he showed his speed and acceleration while recording a 4.63 40-yard dash time. At the conclusion of the pre-draft process, Orakpo was projected to be a first round pick by NFL draft experts and scouts. He was ranked the best defensive end/outside linebacker prospect in the draft by NFL analyst Bucky Brooks, was ranked the second best defensive end by DraftScout.com, and was ranked the second best outside linebacker in the draft by NFL analyst Mike Mayock.

External videos
- Brian Orakpo's NFL Combine Workout

"Buyer beware, He's boom or bust. I don't know if he's DeMarcus Ware or Vernon Gholston. I've seen him have some really good games, and I've seen what I considered to be Brandon Pettigrew tearing him apart. The point is, I don't see it all the time from Orakpo, which concerns me."

— Mike Mayock

Pre-draft measurables
Height	Weight	Arm length	Hand span	40-yard dash	10-yard split	20-yard split	20-yard shuttle	Three-cone drill	Vertical jump	Broad jump	Bench press	Wonderlic
6 ft 3 in (1.91 m)	263 lb (119 kg)	33 1/2 in (0.85 m)	9 1/2 in (0.24 m)	4.63 s	1.58 s	2.66 s	4.45 s	7.26 s	39.5 in (1.00 m)	10 ft 10 in (3.30 m)	31 reps	25
All values from NFL Combine/Texas' Pro Day

=== Washington Redskins ===
==== 2009 season ====
The Washington Redskins selected Orakpo in the first round (13th overall) of the 2009 NFL draft. Orakpo was the third defensive end drafted in 2009.

External videos
- Redskins draft Brian Orakpo 13th overall
- First Draft: Brian Orakpo

On July 31, 2009, the Washington Redskins signed Orakpo to a five-year, $15.33 million contract that included $11.69 million guaranteed and a signing bonus of $6.36 million.

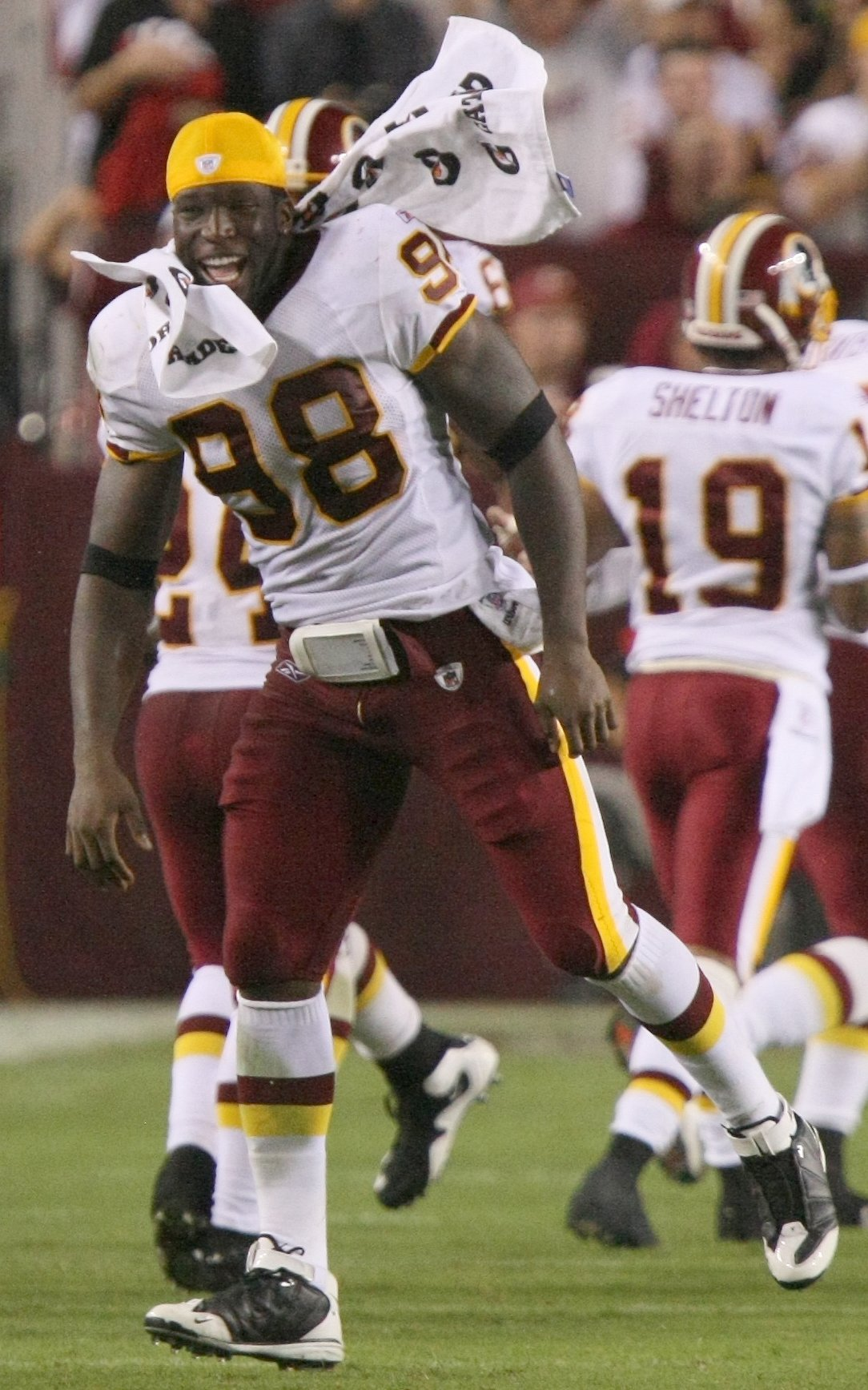
Orakpo during a Redskins' preseason game in 2009.

Head coach Jim Zorn named Orakpo the starting strongside linebacker to begin the regular season, along with Rocky McIntosh and middle linebacker London Fletcher.

Orakpo made his NFL debut and first start in the season-opener against the New York Giants and recorded two solo tackles in a 23–17 road loss. During Week 3, he recorded four combined tackles and made his first NFL sack during a 19–14 loss at the Detroit Lions. Orakpo made his first career sack on quarterback Matthew Stafford for an eight-yard loss in the third quarter. In the next game, he collected a season-high seven combined tackles and a sack in a 16–13 victory over the Tampa Bay Buccaneers. During Week 14, Orakpo made six combined tackles and a season-high four sacks as the Redskins defeated the Oakland Raiders by a score 34–13. Orakpo had a sack on Bruce Gradkowski and three sacks on Jamarcus Russell and tied the Redskins' single-game sack record. He earned the NFC Defensive Player of the Week award for his performance. On December 30, 2009, it was announced that Orakpo was selected to play in the 2010 Pro Bowl and was the only rookie to be initially voted to the NFC roster. Orakpo became the first Redskins' rookie to make the Pro Bowl since RB/KR Tony Green in 1978.

Orakpo finished his rookie year 50 combined tackles (37 solo), a career-high 11 sacks, and two pass deflections in 16 games and starts.

==== 2010 season ====
On January 4, 2010, the Redskins fired head coach Jim Zorn after they finished with a 4–12 record in 2009. The Washington Redskins hired Jim Haslett as their new defensive coordinator and installed a base 3-4 defense. Head coach Mike Shanahan named Orakpo and Andre Carter the starting outside linebackers to begin the regular season, along with inside linebackers London Fletcher and Rocky McIntosh.

During Week 5, Orakpo recorded three combined tackles and a season-high a two sacks on quarterback Aaron Rodgers during a 16–13 win over the Green Bay Packers. In Week 10, he collected a season-high eight combined tackles and was credited with half a sack during a 59–28 loss to the Philadelphia Eagles. Orakpo was sidelined for the Week 16 victory at the Jacksonville Jaguars after sustaining a hamstring injury the previous week.

Orakpo finished his second professional season with 56 combined tackles (36 solo), 8.5 sacks, two pass deflections, and a forced fumble in 15 games and starts. On January 23, 2011, it was announced that he would play in the 2011 Pro Bowl as a replacement for Packers linebacker Clay Matthews III who was appearing in Super Bowl XLV.

==== 2011 season ====
Head coach Mike Shanahan named Orakpo and Ryan Kerrigan the starting outside linebackers to start the regular season, along with inside linebackers London Fletcher and Rocky McIntosh.

During Week 4 against the St. Louis Rams, Orakpo recorded five combined tackles, a forced fumble, and had a season-high 2.5 sacks on Rams' quarterback Sam Bradford during a 17–10 road victory. His performance earned him the NFC Defensive Player of the Week award. Three weeks later, he collected a season-high six combined tackles and a sack in a 33–20 road loss against the Carolina Panthers. In the regular-season finale, Orakpo recorded three solo tackles and made two sacks during a 34–10 road loss to the Philadelphia Eagles. He exited the game after suffering an injury to his left shoulder and pectoral muscle after sacking Michael Vick in the second quarter.

On January 10, 2012, it was reported that Orakpo successfully underwent surgery to repair his shoulder. Orakpo was selected as an alternate for the 2012 Pro Bowl along with teammates, London Fletcher and Lorenzo Alexander. He finished his third season with 59 combined tackles (34 solo), nine sacks, and five pass deflections in 16 games and starts.

==== 2012 season ====
Orakpo and Ryan Kerrigan returned as the starting outside linebackers to begin the regular season, along with London Fletcher and Perry Riley.

During Week 2, Orakpo recorded three solo tackles and a sack before exiting the 31–28 road loss against the St. Louis Rams after tearing his pectoral muscle. On September 18, 2012, the Redskins officially placed Orakpo on injured reserve after confirming he would have to undergo surgery to repair his torn pectoral muscle and would miss the rest of the season.

Orakpo finished the season with five solo tackles, three pass deflections, and a sack in two games and starts.

==== 2013 season ====
During Week 4, Orakpo recorded four combined tackles, a season-high two sacks, and broke up two passes during a 24–14 road victory against the Oakland Raiders. Three weeks later, he recorded four combined tackles, a pass deflection, and returned an interception for his first NFL touchdown during a 45–41 victory against the Chicago Bears. Orakpo intercepted a pass by quarterback Jay Cutler, that was intended for wide receiver Alshon Jeffery, and returned it 29 yards for a touchdown in the second quarter. During Week 13, Orakpo recorded six combined tackles and tied his season-high of two sacks during a 24–17 loss to the New York Giants. Orakpo was inactive for the Redskins' Week 17 loss as the New York Giants due a ground injury he sustained the previous week. On December 30, 2013, the Washington Redskins fired head coach Mike Shanahan after they finished with a 3–13 record.

Orakpo finished the season with a career-high 60 combined tackles (43 solo), ten sacks, four pass deflections, an interception, and a touchdown in 15 games and starts. On January 21, 2014, it was announced that he would play in the 2014 Pro Bowl as a replacement for Ahmad Brooks who withdrew from the game.

==== 2014 season ====
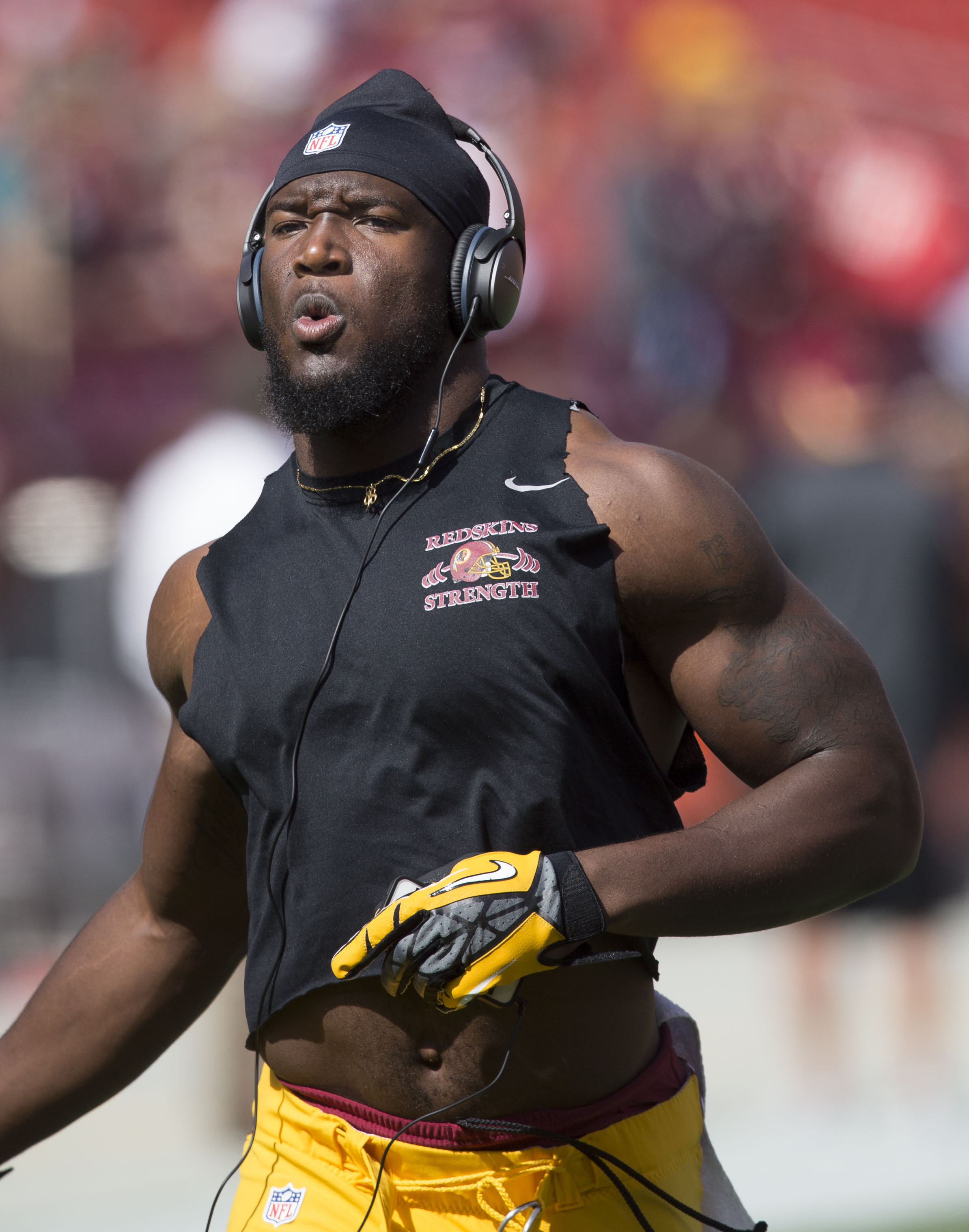
Orakpo with the Washington Redskins in 2014

On March 3, 2014, the Redskins applied their non-exclusive franchise tag on Orakpo which allowed them to match any contract offer by other teams attempting to sign him. On March 27, 2014, he signed his one-year, $11.45 million franchise tender.

New head coach Jay Gruden retained defensive coordinator Jim Haslett and opted to retain the base 3–4 defense. He named Orakpo and Ryan Kerrigan the starting outside linebackers to begin the regular season, along with inside linebackers Keenan Robinson and Perry Riley. During Week 5, he collected a season-high eight combined tackles during a 27–17 loss to the Seattle Seahawks. On October 19, 2014, Orakpo made one tackle before exiting in the fourth quarter of the Redskins' 19–17 win against the Tennessee Titans due to an injury to his right shoulder. The following day, it was announced that Orakpo had torn his pectoral muscle and was expected to miss the rest of the season. On October 21, 2014, the Redskins officially placed him on injured reserve for the remainder of the season.

Orakpo finished the 2014 season with 24 combined tackles (14 solo), a pass deflection, and was credited with half a sack in seven games and starts. He became an unrestricted free agent in 2015 and was regarded as the top free agent linebacker available. He attended a private meeting with the Tennessee Titans and had a meeting scheduled with the Arizona Cardinals.

=== Tennessee Titans ===
On March 13, 2015, the Tennessee Titans signed Orakpo to a four-year, $31 million contract with $13.50 million guaranteed and a signing bonus of $5 million.

==== 2015 season ====
Orakpo entered training camp slated as the starting right outside linebacker. Head coach Ken Whisenhunt named Orakpo and Derrick Morgan the starting outside linebackers to begin the regular season, along with inside linebackers Avery Williamson and Zach Brown.

On October 21, 2015, Orakpo was announced as the Titans' defensive captain. It marked the first time he was named a team captain during his career. On November 3, 2015, the Tennessee Titans fired head coach Ken Whisenhunt after the Titans began the season with a 1–6 record. Tight ends coach Mike Mularkey was promoted to interim head coach for the remainder of the season. During Week 9, Orakpo recorded four combined tackles, deflected a pass, and had a season-high two sacks on quarterback Drew Brees during a 34–28 overtime road victory against the New Orleans Saints. In the next game, he had a season-high six combined tackles and a sack as the Titans lost 27–10 to the Carolina Panthers in Week 10.

Orakpo finished his first season with the Titans with 51 combined tackles (38 solo), seven sacks, and five pass deflections in 16 games and starts.

==== 2016 season ====
The Titans retained head coach Mike Mularkey and hired Dick LeBeau as their new defensive coordinator. Mularkey named Orakpo and Derrick Morgan the starting outside linebackers to begin the regular season, along with inside linebackers Avery Williamson and Wesley Woodyard.

During Week 5, Orakpo collected a season-high six combined tackles and sacked quarterback Ryan Tannehill twice during a 30–17 road victory against the Miami Dolphins. On December 20, 2016, it was announced that Orakpo was named to the 2017 Pro Bowl roster.

Orakpo finished the 2016 season with 46 combined tackles (38 solo), 10.5 sacks, four pass deflections, and a forced fumble in 16 games and starts. He was ranked 78th by his fellow players on the NFL Top 100 Players of 2017.

==== 2017 season ====
Head coach Mike Mularkey retained Orakpo, Derrick Morgan, Wesley Woodyard, and Avery Williamson as the starting linebackers in 2017.

During a Week 2 37–16 victory over the Jacksonville Jaguars, Orakpo forced a fumble off of quarterback Blake Bortles, which was recovered by teammate Erik Walden. During Week 12, Orakpo recorded four combined tackles and a season-high 1.5 sacks during a 20–16 road victory against the Indianapolis Colts. During Week 16, he collected a season-high six combined tackles in a 27–23 loss against the Los Angeles Rams.

Orakpo finished the 2017 season 44 combined tackles (30 solo), seven sacks, three forced fumbles, and two pass deflections in 16 games and starts. The Titans finished second in the AFC South with a 9–7 record and qualified for the playoffs as a Wild Card team. On January 6, 2018, Orakpo started in his first career playoff game and recorded two combined tackles and 1.5 sacks during a narrow 22–21 road victory against the Kansas City Chiefs in the AFC Wild Card Round. The following week, he recorded two combined tackles as the Titans lost to the New England Patriots in the AFC Divisional Round on the road by a score of 35–14.

==== 2018 season ====
Orakpo missed the final three games of the season due to an elbow injury. He finished the 2018 with 28 tackles, 1.5 sacks, three passes defensed, and a forced fumble in 13 games starting all of them.

=== Retirement ===
On December 31, 2018, Orakpo announced his retirement from the NFL after 10 seasons.

== NFL career statistics ==
Legend
**Bold**	Career high

=== Regular season ===
Year	Team	Games		Tackles				Interceptions						Fumbles	
Year	Team	GP	GS	Comb	Total	Ast	Sck	Int	Yds	Avg	Lng	TD	PD	FF	FR
2009	WAS	16	16	50	37	13	**11.0**	0	0	0.0	0	0	2	1	0
2010	WAS	15	15	56	36	20	8.5	0	0	0.0	0	0	2	1	0
2011	WAS	16	16	59	34	25	9.0	0	0	0.0	0	0	**5**	**3**	1
2012	WAS	2	2	5	5	0	1.0	0	0	0.0	0	0	3	1	0
2013	WAS	15	15	**60**	**43**	**17**	10.0	**1**	**29**	**29.0**	**29T**	**1**	4	0	**2**
2014	WAS	7	7	24	14	10	0.5	0	0	0.0	0	0	1	0	0
2015	TEN	16	16	51	38	13	7.0	0	0	0.0	0	0	**5**	1	0
2016	TEN	16	16	46	38	8	10.5	0	0	0.0	0	0	4	1	0
2017	TEN	16	16	44	30	14	7.0	0	0	0.0	0	0	2	**3**	0
2018	TEN	13	13	28	18	10	1.5	0	0	0.0	0	0	3	1	0
Career		132	132	423	293	130	66.0	1	29	29.0	29T	1	31	12	3

=== Postseason ===
Year	Team	Games		Tackles				Interceptions						Fumbles	
Year	Team	GP	GS	Comb	Total	Ast	Sck	Int	Yds	Avg	Lng	TD	PD	FF	FR
2017	TEN	2	2	4	2	2	1.5	0	0	0.0	0	0	0	0	0
Career		2	2	4	2	2	1.5	0	0	0.0	0	0	0	0	0

== Personal life ==
Among Orakpo's endorsement contracts included one he signed in August 2011 with Geico, and he appeared in several commercials with one of that company's "caveman" spokespeople. While with the Redskins, Orakpo also appeared in several commercials for Eastern Motors, a D.C. area car dealership. Brian married his wife Bitura in 2009. They have three children together.. In 2018, Orakpo and Tennessee Titans teammate Michael Griffin opened a franchise of Gigi's Cupcakes outside Austin, Texas with their friend, Bryan Hynson.
