= Carlos Rogers (American football) =

American football player (born 1981)

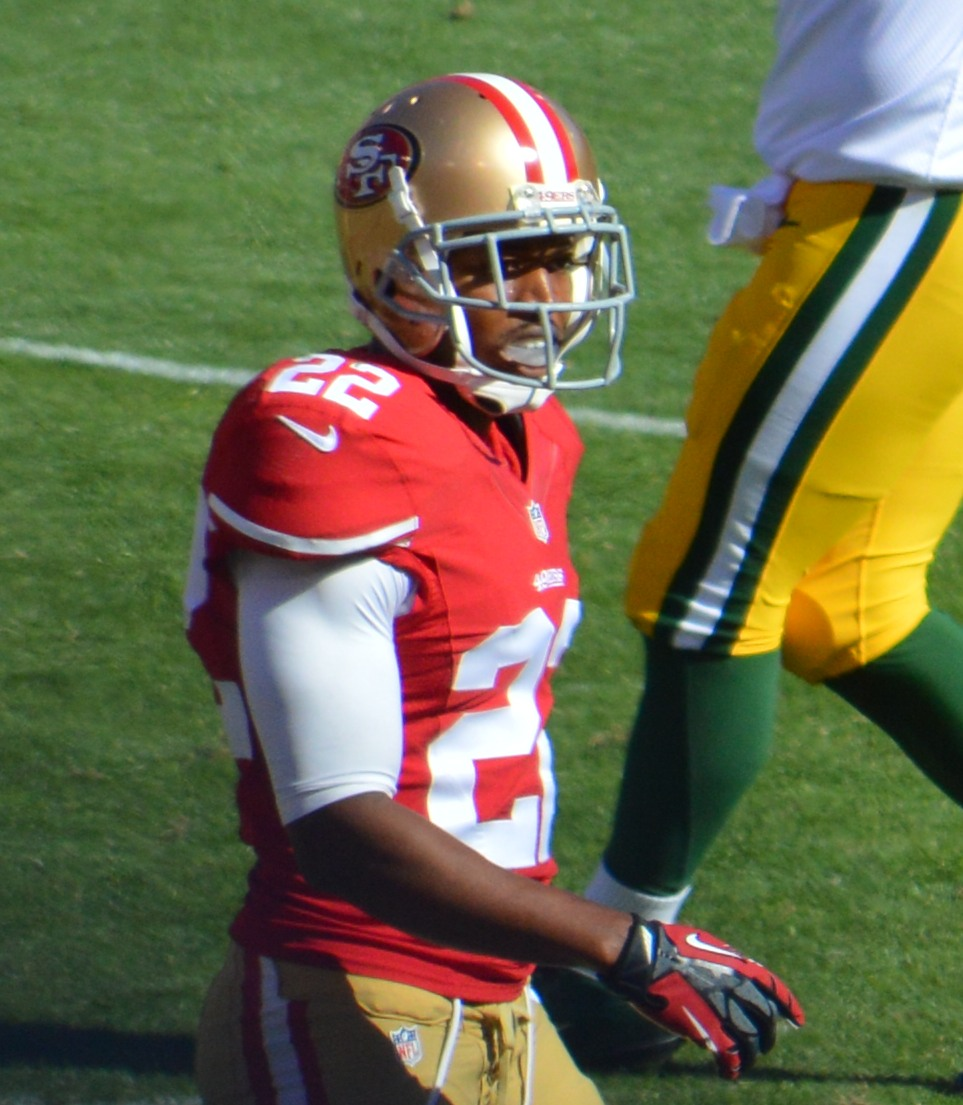
- Rogers with the San Francisco 49ers in 2013

No. 22, 27
- Position: Cornerback

Personal information
- Born: July 2, 1981 (age 45); Augusta, Georgia, U.S.
- Listed height: 6 ft 0 in (1.83 m)
- Listed weight: 195 lb (88 kg)

Career information
- High school: Butler (Augusta)
- College: Auburn (2001–2004)
- NFL draft: 2005: 1st round, 9th overall pick

Career history
- Washington Redskins (2005–2010); San Francisco 49ers (2011–2013); Oakland Raiders (2014)

Awards and highlights
- Second-team All-Pro (2011); Pro Bowl (2011); Jim Thorpe Award (2004); Consensus All-American (2004); First-team All-SEC (2004)

Career NFL statistics
- Total tackles: 481
- Sacks: 1
- Forced fumbles: 5
- Fumble recoveries: 5
- Interceptions: 17
- Defensive touchdowns: 3
- Stats at Pro Football Reference

Carlos Cornelius Rogers (born July 2, 1981) is an American former professional football player who was a cornerback in the National Football League (NFL). He played college football for the Auburn Tigers, earning consensus All-American honors. Rogers was selected by the Washington Redskins with the ninth overall pick in the 2005 NFL draft. He also played for the San Francisco 49ers and Oakland Raiders.

== Early life ==
Rogers was born in Augusta, Georgia on July 2, 1981. He was raised in Thomson, Georgia until his family moved to Augusta while he was in middle school. He attended Butler High School, where he played football, basketball, and participated in track and field. In football, Rogers played both offense and defense. As a senior, he rushed for 1,332 yards and 11 touchdowns and posted 47 tackles with two interceptions. He was a SuperPrep All-American, an Augusta Chronicle all-area and all-metro choice, and was listed in The Atlanta Journal-Constitution's "Georgia 75". In basketball, he averaged 14.2 points per game as a senior and 13.8 points as a junior. In track, he posted times of 10.7 seconds in the 100-meter dash and 21.0 seconds in the 200-meter dash.

== College career ==
Rogers attended Auburn University, where he played for coach Tommy Tuberville's Auburn Tigers football team from 2001 to 2004. He started 44 games over four years, and finished his career with 182 tackles (134 individual), seven interceptions, and two fumble recoveries. He holds Auburn's career record with forty pass deflections, which ranks second in SEC history. He was named to the Auburn football All-Decade Team for the 2000s.

Rogers graduated with a bachelor's degree in sociology.

=== Freshman year (2001) ===
As a freshman, Rogers started 10 of 12 games and finished the season with 58 tackles (46 individual), one fumble recovery, and 12 pass deflections. On October 6, he recorded a career-high ten tackles, as well as two pass deflections, in a win over Mississippi State University. Auburn was selected to play in the 2001 Peach Bowl after the regular season, where they lost 16–10 against the University of North Carolina. In the game, he recorded six tackles. Rogers was chosen as a Freshman All-American by The Sporting News, as well as an All-SEC Freshman choice.

=== Sophomore year (2002) ===
In 2002, Rogers started 9 of 13 games and recorded 48 tackles (34 individual), four interceptions, and nine pass deflections as a sophomore. In a win over Syracuse University on September 8, he recorded two interceptions and returned one for 35 yards. He did not make much of an impact in a Capital One Bowl win over Penn State University, where he deflected one pass and made no tackles.

=== Junior year (2003) ===
As a junior, Rogers started and played in 12 games. In the win over the University of Tennessee on October 4, he had an interception and four tackles before he fractured his left thumb. He sat out against the University of Arkansas the following week, underwent surgery in late October, and then played in several games with a cast. After the regular season, Auburn was invited to the 2003 Music City Bowl, where they would beat the University of Wisconsin 28–14. In the game, Rogers recorded three tackles and four pass deflections. He finished the season with 29 tackles (17 individual) with nine pass deflections and an interception.

=== Senior year (2004) ===
During his senior season, Rogers started every game and helped lead Auburn to 13–0 undefeated season. He finished with 47 tackles (37 individual), two interceptions, ten pass deflections, half a sack, and five tackles for loss in his final season. Rogers, who was Auburn's first Jim Thorpe Award winner—given annually to the best defensive back in the country—earned consensus All-America honors and was one of five finalists for the Bronco Nagurski Award and a semifinalist for the Chuck Bednarik Award, each given to the best defensive college football player in the United States.

== Professional career ==
Pre-draft measurables
Height	Weight	Arm length	Hand span	40-yard dash	10-yard split	20-yard split	20-yard shuttle	Three-cone drill	Vertical jump	Broad jump	Bench press	Wonderlic
6 ft 0 3/8 in (1.84 m)	196 lb (89 kg)	31 3/8 in (0.80 m)	8 7/8 in (0.23 m)	4.44 s	1.55 s	2.60 s	3.82 s	6.48 s	40.5 in (1.03 m)	10 ft 6 in (3.20 m)	15 reps	14
All values from NFL Combine

=== Washington Redskins ===
The Washington Redskins selected Rogers in the first round (ninth overall) of the 2005 NFL draft. He was the second cornerback selected in the draft, following Adam Jones (sixth overall). He was the third of four players from Auburn to be selected in the 2005 NFL Draft, along with Ronnie Brown (2nd overall), Cadillac Williams (5th overall), and Jason Campbell (25th overall).

==== 2005 ====
On August 2, 2005, the Washington Redskins signed Rogers to a five–year, $13.05 million rookie contract that included $11.23 million guaranteed upon signing. The entire contract had a maximum value of $17.45 million, including incentives.

After an ankle injury forced him to miss the first preseason game, Rogers played in his first game on August 19, a preseason loss to the Cincinnati Bengals. In the game, he intercepted a pass from Carson Palmer and returned the ball to Cincinnati's 25-yard line. On the next play, Redskins quarterback Patrick Ramsey threw a touchdown pass to James Thrash. Rogers made his first NFL regular season start on October 2, in an overtime win against the Seattle Seahawks during which he had seven tackles (five individual) and one forced fumble. In an overtime loss to the San Diego Chargers on November 27, he recorded his first NFL interception off of Drew Brees. He also had a team-high eight tackles (seven individual) and three pass deflections. The following week in a win against the St. Louis Rams, Rogers intercepted Ryan Fitzpatrick and had six tackles.

Rogers appeared in 12 regular season games and started five games. He finished the season with 40 tackles (34 individual), two interceptions, four pass deflections, and two forced fumbles. He also started the Redskins' two postseason games, in which he recorded 13 tackles and one pass deflection.

==== 2006 ====
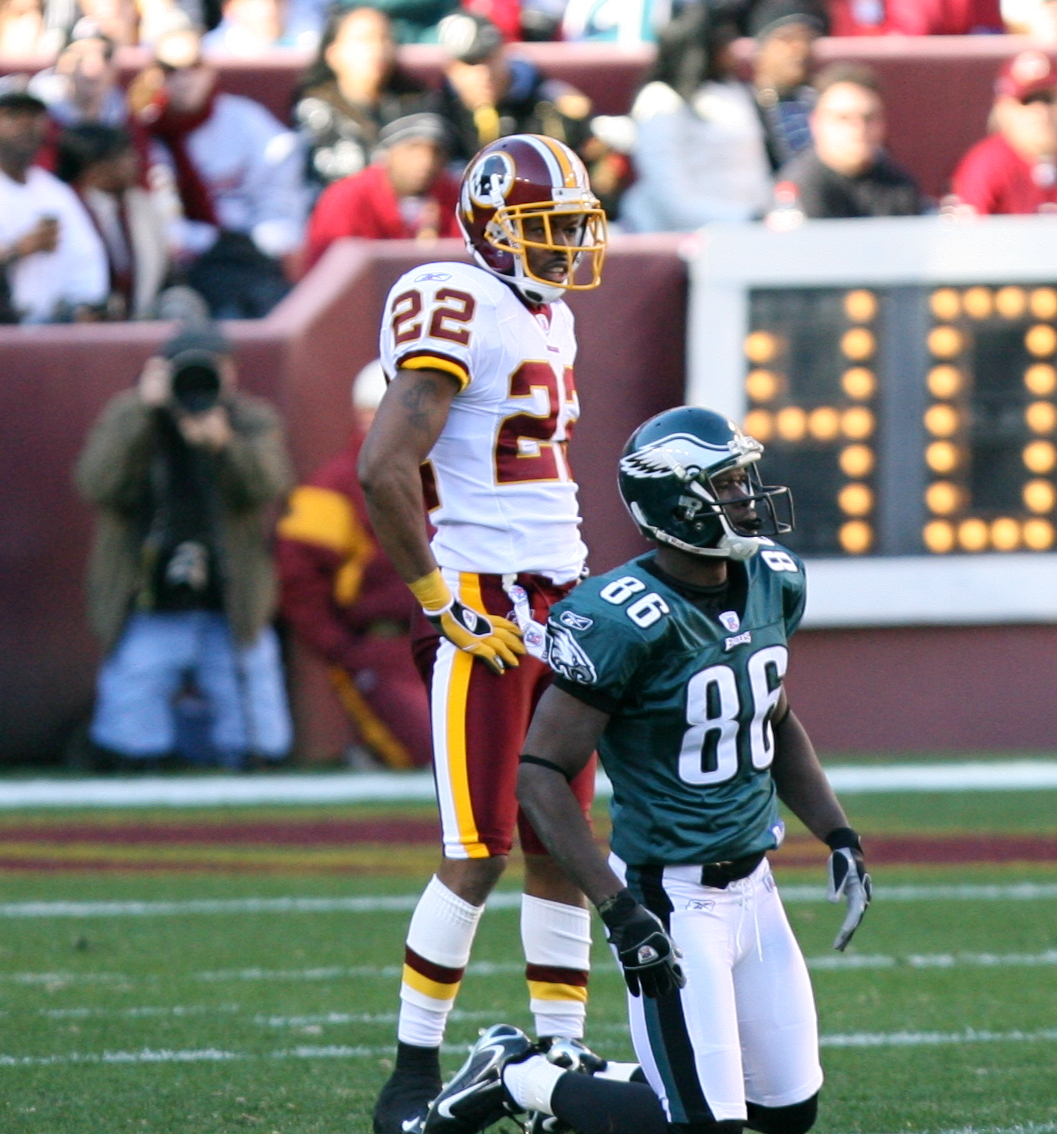
Rogers covering Philadelphia Eagles wide receiver, Reggie Brown in 2006.

Rogers started 15 games and recorded a career-high 88 tackles (71 individual), one interception, and 17 pass deflections. He was inactive during the Indianapolis Colts loss on October 22, due to a fractured thumb.

==== 2007 ====
On October 7, Rogers recorded his first career interception return for a touchdown, when he intercepted a pass from Jon Kitna and returned it a career-best 61 yards in the 34–3 win over the Detroit Lions. He started the first seven games of the season before he tore his ACL and MCL in a loss against the New England Patriots on October 28. It was decided that surgery was the best option and he was placed on injured reserve on October 30. Rogers recorded 30 tackles (23 individual), one interception, and eight pass deflections during this shortened season.

==== 2008 season ====
Rogers returned from his knee injury from the previous season and started in the first game, a 16–7 loss to the New York Giants. On September 21, he started the game vs. the Arizona Cardinals by jumping on an Edgerrin James fumble on the Cardinals 34 yard line in the first quarter which resulted in a Redskins field goal four plays later. He later made a diving interception against Kurt Warner of the Arizona Cardinals in the fourth quarter. Rogers then got to his feet, avoided a tackle by Larry Fitzgerald, and ran 42 yards to the 15-yard line. Two plays later, Santana Moss caught a short pass from Jason Campbell and scooted in 17 yards for the score, giving the Redskins a 24–17 victory. The following game was at Texas Stadium vs. the Dallas Cowboys. Although Shawn Springs was assigned to cover the Cowboys #1 receiver, Terrell Owens, Springs became injured in the middle of the third quarter. With a three-point lead and the game on the line, the responsibility of covering T.O. on short to intermediate routes fell to Rogers. From that point forward, Rogers and the Washington defense held T.O. to two receptions on eight pass attempts, including three passes in a row from Tony Romo to T.O. into Rogers's coverage at the beginning of the 4th quarter - all incompletions. Redskins won 26–24 and the game was chosen as the NFL Films Game of the Week. Rogers acquired 7 tackles (6 solo) during the game, which was the high for the team that game and Rogers' high for the entire year. Rogers played in all 16 regular season games for the first time in his career, with 14 starts. He finished the season with 53 tackles (45 individual), two interceptions, 77 interception return yards, and one fumble recovery.

==== 2009 ====
Rogers played in 16 regular season games with 15 starts in 2009. He recorded 46 tackles (34 individual), two fumble recoveries, and a team-high 12 pass deflections. He helped the Redskins defense finish tenth in the league in overall defense and ninth in pass defense.

==== 2010 ====
Rogers played and started 12 games and recorded 54 combined tackles, 12 pass break-ups, two interceptions, and one forced fumble.

=== San Francisco 49ers ===
==== 2011 season ====
On August 2, 2011, he signed a one-year contract with the San Francisco 49ers. He went on to lead the team with six interceptions that year and was named a starter on the NFC Pro Bowl roster as well as a Second-team All-Pro by the Associated Press.

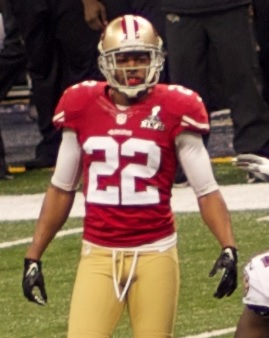
Rogers during Super Bowl XLVII.

==== 2012 season ====
On March 14, 2012, Rogers re-signed with the team to a four-year, $31.3 million contract.

In the 2012 season, Rogers and the 49ers appeared in Super Bowl XLVII. In the game, he had three combined tackles as the 49ers fell to the Baltimore Ravens by a score of 34–31.

He was ranked 69th by his fellow players on the NFL Network's Top 100 Players of 2012.

==== 2013 season ====
Although Rogers had a solid year with 47 combined tackles and 2 interceptions, the 49ers released Rogers on March 10, 2014, the eve of free agency, and thus allowing him to test the market.

=== Oakland Raiders ===
On March 31, 2014, Rogers signed with the Oakland Raiders.

== NFL career statistics ==
Year	Team	GP	Tackles				Fumbles			Interceptions					
Year	Team	GP	Cmb	Solo	Ast	Sck	FF	FR	Yds	Int	Yds	Avg	Lng	TD	PD
2005	WAS	12	46	42	4	0.0	2	0	0	2	14	7.0	14	0	4
2006	WAS	15	80	68	12	0.0	1	0	0	1	0	0.0	0	0	17
2007	WAS	7	25	20	5	0.0	0	0	0	1	61	61.0	61	1	7
2008	WAS	16	56	49	7	0.0	0	1	0	2	73	36.5	42	0	24
2009	WAS	16	39	36	3	0.0	0	1	0	0	0	0.0	0	0	12
2010	WAS	12	54	43	11	0.0	1	0	0	2	43	21.5	38	0	12
2011	SF	16	43	40	3	0.0	0	0	0	6	106	17.7	31	1	18
2012	SF	16	56	50	6	1.0	0	3	63	1	63	63.0	63	0	7
2013	SF	16	47	39	8	0.0	0	0	0	2	14	7.0	11	0	8
2014	OAK	7	35	26	9	0.0	1	0	0	0	0	0.0	0	0	2
Career		133	446	387	59	1.0	4	5	0	17	374	22.0	63	2	109

== Healthcare fraud case ==
Rogers was charged with one count of conspiracy to commit wire fraud and health care fraud, two counts of wire fraud, and two counts of health care fraud by the United States Department of Justice on December 12, 2019. He initially pleaded not guilty to the charges, but later pled guilty in November 2020 to one count of conspiracy. By September 2021, Rogers was sentenced to 180 days of house arrest and ordered to perform 400 hours of community service.
