= Reed Doughty =

American football player (born 1982)

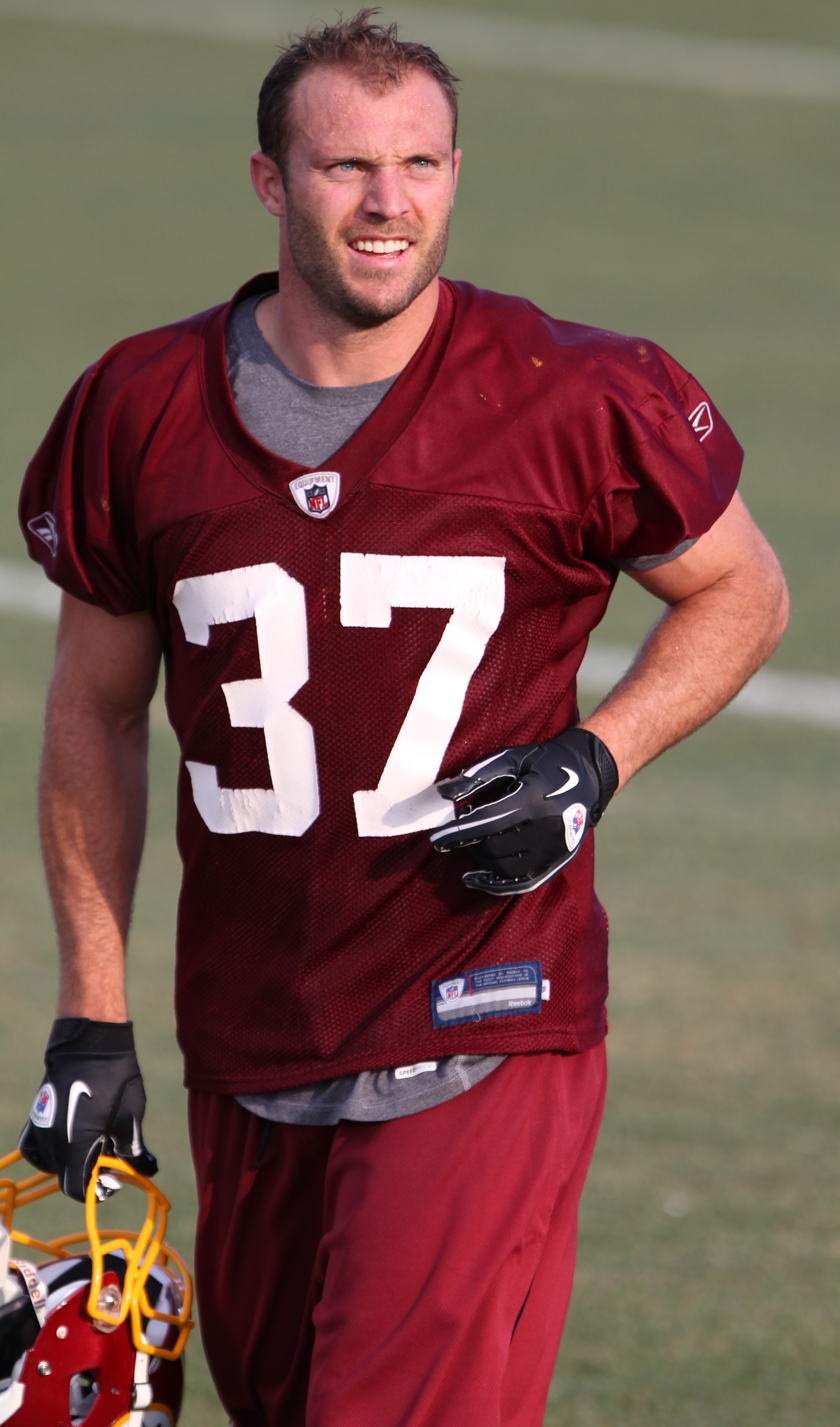
- Doughty with the Washington Redskins in 2011

No. 23, 37
- Position: Safety

Personal information
- Born: November 4, 1982 (age 44); Greeley, Colorado, U.S.
- Listed height: 6 ft 1 in (1.85 m)
- Listed weight: 206 lb (93 kg)

Career information
- High school: Roosevelt (Johnstown, Colorado)
- College: Northern Colorado
- NFL draft: 2006: 6th round, 173rd overall pick

Career history
- Washington Redskins (2006–2013)

Career NFL statistics
- Total tackles: 507
- Sacks: 3.5
- Forced fumbles: 3
- Pass deflections: 11
- Interceptions: 3
- Stats at Pro Football Reference

Reed Doughty (born November 4, 1982) is an American former professional football player who was a safety for the Washington Redskins of the National Football League (NFL). He spent his entire eight-year NFL career with the Redskins and also played college football for the Northern Colorado Bears.

Doughty is best known for taking over the starting job at free safety following the injury and subsequent death of Sean Taylor as well as for his public work to support organ donation, particularly for Americans with kidney disease.

== High School Career ==
Doughty grew up in Johnstown, Colorado where he attended Roosevelt High School. Despite being diagnosed with hearing loss in kindergarten—a condition he managed by sitting at the front of classrooms and relying on hand signals on the field—he excelled as a three-sport letter winner. His impact on Roosevelt’s football program ultimately led to the retirement of his jersey number (24).

== College career ==
Doughty stayed local for college, attending Northern Colorado where he became the schools first-ever three-time Academic All-American, graduating with a degree in Sports and Exercise Science with a perfect 4.0 GPA. Doughty was also a finalist for the Draddy Trophy award (also known as the "Academic Heisman") following his senior year.

As of 2025, Doughty ranks third overall in the program history for career total tackles (466), and tied for fifth all-time in career interceptions (14). Doughty also holds the Bears single-season record for tackles (159) and the single-game record for tackles (21) against Nebraska-Omaha on October 5, 2002.

== Professional career ==
Pre-draft measurables
Height	Weight	Arm length	Hand span	40-yard dash	10-yard split	20-yard split	20-yard shuttle	Three-cone drill	Vertical jump	Broad jump	Bench press
6 ft 0 1/2 in (1.84 m)	209 lb (95 kg)	31 3/8 in (0.80 m)	10 in (0.25 m)	4.62 s	1.58 s	2.67 s	4.17 s	6.66 s	37.0 in (0.94 m)	10 ft 1 in (3.07 m)	15 reps
All values from NFL Combine/Pro Day

=== Washington Redskins ===
Doughty was drafted by the Washington Redskins in the sixth round of the 2006 NFL draft. In 2007, Doughty switched his jersey number to 37 from 23, which he wore in his rookie season. He had his first career start in Week 11 of the 2007 season against the Dallas Cowboys. In the 2010 season, he recorded a career high of 93 tackles as well as one sack, two pass deflections, and one forced fumble.

In 2011, Doughty was re-signed by the Redskins to a three-year contract. Throughout the 2011 season, he played as the backup to both free safety, Oshiomogho Atogwe, and strong safety, LaRon Landry, splitting the responsibility with DeJon Gomes. Before the start of the 2013 season, Doughty was elected by his teammates to be the Redskins' special teams captain.

Doughty finished his Redskins career with 506 tackles, 3.5 sacks, three interceptions, three forced fumbles and two fumble recoveries. His 506 career tackles places him third overall in franchise history.

== NFL career statistics ==
Legend
**Bold**	Career high

=== Regular season ===
Year	Team	Games		Tackles					Interceptions					Fumbles			
Year	Team	GP	GS	Cmb	Solo	Ast	Sck	TFL	Int	Yds	TD	Lng	PD	FF	FR	Yds	TD
2006	WAS	10	0	14	11	3	0.0	0	0	0	0	0	0	0	0	0	0
2007	WAS	**16**	6	53	32	21	0.5	1	0	0	0	0	2	0	0	0	0
2008	WAS	4	3	19	15	4	0.0	0	0	0	0	0	1	0	0	0	0
2009	WAS	15	7	91	**75**	16	**2.0**	**6**	**1**	13	0	13	**3**	0	**1**	0	0
2010	WAS	15	9	**93**	54	**39**	1.0	1	0	0	0	0	2	1	0	0	0
2011	WAS	**16**	**11**	88	58	30	0.0	2	0	0	0	0	0	**2**	**1**	0	0
2012	WAS	**16**	10	69	44	25	0.0	1	**1**	1	0	1	1	0	0	0	0
2013	WAS	15	8	80	47	33	0.0	1	**1**	**25**	0	**25**	2	0	0	0	0
Career		107	54	507	336	171	3.5	12	3	39	0	25	11	3	2	0	0

=== Playoffs ===
Year	Team	Games		Tackles					Interceptions					Fumbles			
Year	Team	GP	GS	Cmb	Solo	Ast	Sck	TFL	Int	Yds	TD	Lng	PD	FF	FR	Yds	TD
2007	WAS	**1**	0	5	4	1	0.0	0	0	0	0	0	0	0	0	0	0
2012	WAS	**1**	**1**	**13**	**7**	**6**	**2.0**	**2**	0	0	0	0	**1**	0	0	0	0
Career		2	1	18	11	7	2.0	2	0	0	0	0	1	0	0	0	0

== Personal ==
Doughty has severe hearing impairment and sometimes has to read lips to understand what others are saying.

In 2002, Doughty married his girlfriend Katie. They met several years earlier at 3J's Christian Coffeehouse in Johnstown, Colorado, his hometown while they were both in high school. The Doughtys had a baby in August 2006, a son named Micah. Micah was born prematurely and suffered kidney failure as a baby, but received a successful kidney transplant and is now doing well. The Doughtys also had a daughter and are currently living in northern Colorado.

Doughty is a Christian.
