= Robert Henson (American football) =

American football player (born 1986)

No. 51
- Position: Linebacker

Personal information
- Born: January 27, 1986 (age 40); Richmond, California, U.S.
- Listed height: 6 ft 0 in (1.83 m)
- Listed weight: 242 lb (110 kg)

Career information
- High school: Longview
- College: Texas Christian
- NFL draft: 2009: 6th round, 186th overall pick

Career history
- Washington Redskins (2009–2010)

Awards and highlights
- First-team All-MW (2008)

Career NFL statistics
- Tackles: 2
- Stats at Pro Football Reference

Robert Henson (born January 27, 1986) is an American former professional football player who was a linebacker in the National Football League (NFL). He was selected by the Washington Redskins in the sixth round of the 2009 NFL draft. He played college football for the TCU Horned Frogs.

== Early life ==
Henson earned District 11-5A Defensive Player of the Year honors as a senior in 2003 at Longview High School in Longview, Texas. He chose to attend TCU over offers from Arkansas and Nebraska.

== College career ==
Henson began his college career at Texas Christian University as a redshirt freshman in 2005, when he started two games and played in all twelve as a redshirt freshman for the MWC Champion Horned Frogs. In his freshman, sophomore and junior seasons, Henson was at least third on the team in tackles, was named Honorable Mention All-MWC, and the Frogs won their bowl game. In his senior year, he was named 1st Team All-MWC and recorded 73 tackles, one sack and two interceptions.

== Professional career ==
Henson was selected by the Washington Redskins in the sixth round of the 2009 NFL draft, to compete for a middle linebacker position and contributing to special teams.

On September 21, 2009, following an "unsightly" 9-7 home victory, Henson posted some disparaging remarks via his Twitter account about fans who had booed and jeered the Redskins' performance. Specifically he called the fans who jeered the team "dim wits", said that the same people would trade places with him in a second due to the money he was making, and that he did not appreciate being booed in his own home stadium. Henson went further by saying the fans did not understand what was best for the team because they "work 9 to 5 at McDonald's", which drew the most criticism. After much criticism from the media and fans, Henson apologized and has since deactivated his account. He was placed on injured reserve on September 4, 2010.

On August 5, 2011, he waived by the Redskins.
