= 2007 Washington Redskins season =

NFL team season

- Owner: Daniel Snyder
- General manager: Vinny Cerrato
- President: Joe Gibbs
- Head coach: Joe Gibbs
- Offensive coordinator: Al Saunders
- Defensive coordinator: Gregg Williams
- Home stadium: FedExField

Results
- Record: 9–7
- Division place: 3rd NFC East
- Playoffs: Lost Wild Card Playoffs (at Seahawks) 14–35
- All-Pros: FS Sean Taylor (2nd team)
- Pro Bowlers: TE Chris Cooley; OT Chris Samuels; FS Sean Taylor; LS Ethan Albright

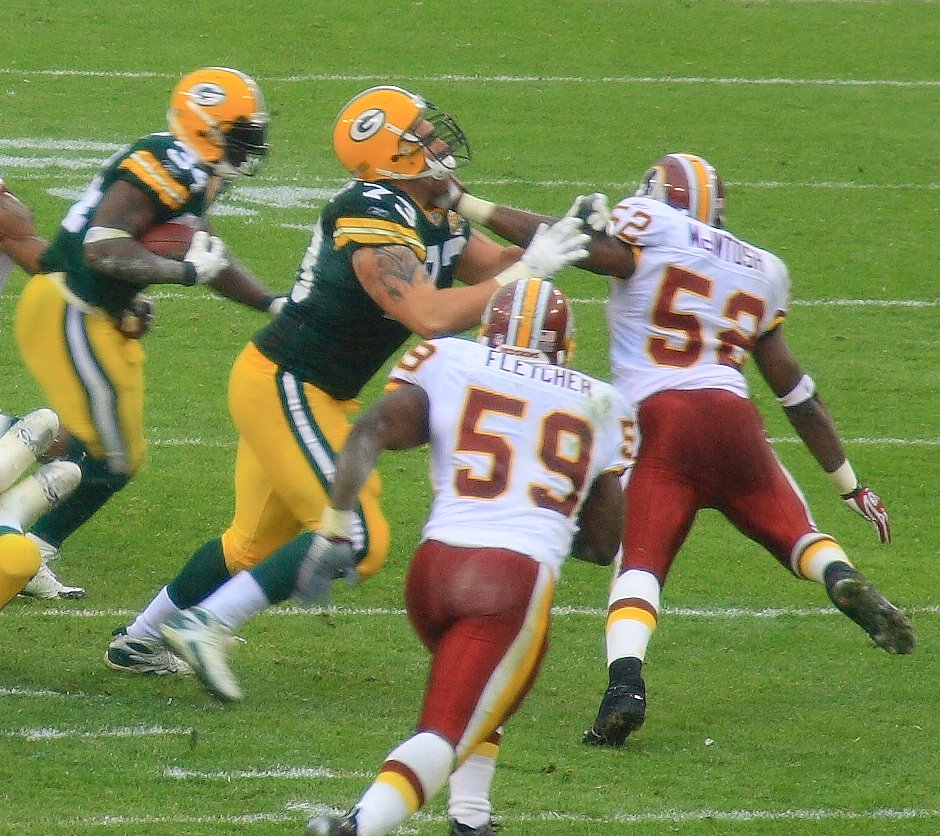
Redskins' linebacker Rocky McIntosh and London Fletcher versus Green Bay, October 14

The 2007 season was the Washington Redskins' 76th season in the National Football League (NFL). The Redskins finished their regular season with a record of 9–7 and a playoff appearance. This was an improvement over the 2006 season when they went 5–11 and finished last in the NFC East.

Over the course of the season, Washington went 5–3 in home games at FedExField, and 4–4 on the road; they lost 6 of their 7 games by one touchdown or less. After losing to the Seattle Seahawks in the wild card round, Coach Joe Gibbs announced his retirement, thus ending his second stint as head coach of the Redskins. During the season, the tragedy of Sean Taylor's death occurred before a game against the Buffalo Bills. For the first defensive play, they fielded 10 men leaving the usual free safety spot empty to honor Taylor.

== Coaching staff ==
Head coach Joe Gibbs entered his fourth year of his second tenure with the Redskins and was the second-to-last year on his existing contract. Gibbs previously coached the Redskins in the 1981–1992 seasons, during which he had won three Super Bowls with the Redskins. On January 8, 2008, three days after the season ended, Gibbs announced his retirement from the position of head coach and president.

The Redskins fired former linebackers coach Dale Lindsey and promoted Kirk Olivadotti to take his job. Olivadotti previously helped coach the defensive line and special teams. The Redskins also added Matthew Shea and Bill Khayat to their coaching staff.

== Offseason ==
=== Signings ===
On March 2, the Redskins signed London Fletcher, formerly with the Buffalo Bills, to a 5-year, $25 million contract. The deal also includes a $10.5 million signing bonus.
On March 3, the Redskins signed Fred Smoot, formerly with the Minnesota Vikings, to a 5-year deal. Smoot was drafted by the Redskins in 2001 and signed with the Vikings in 2005.
On March 8, the Redskins signed Ross Tucker, formerly with the Cleveland Browns, to an undisclosed contract.
On March 21, the Redskins signed Jason Fabini, formerly with the Dallas Cowboys, to an undisclosed contract.
On April 5, the Redskins signed David Macklin, formerly with the Arizona Cardinals, to a 1-year contract.
On June 1, the Redskins signed Jason McAddley, formerly with the San Francisco 49ers, to an undisclosed contract.
On August 21, the Redskins signed Randall Godfrey, formerly with the San Diego Chargers, to an undisclosed contract.

=== Departures ===
On February 22, the Redskins released safety Troy Vincent.
On February 28, the Redskins released tight end Christian Fauria.
On March 2, Derrick Dockery signed with the Buffalo Bills.
On March 4, Kenny Wright signed with the Cleveland Browns.
On March 7, the Redskins released kicker John Hall.
On March 9, T. J. Duckett agreed to terms with the Detroit Lions.
On March 20, Adam Archuleta was traded to the Chicago Bears in exchange for a conditional 6th round draft pick.
On March 22, the Redskins released wide receiver David Patten.
On April 26, Warrick Holdman signed with the Denver Broncos.
On August 21, the Redskins released linebacker Lemar Marshall.
On September 1, the Redskins released cornerback Ade Jimoh and Defensive end Renaldo Wynn.

==== Free agents heading into the 2007 season ====
Position	Player	Free agency tag	Date signed	2007 team
LS	Ethan Albright	UFA	January 12	Washington Redskins
DT	Ryan Boschetti	RFA	March 12	Washington Redskins
G	Derrick Dockery	UFA	March 2	Buffalo Bills
RB	T. J. Duckett	UFA	March 9	Detroit Lions
S	Vernon Fox	UFA	March 2	Washington Redskins
P	Derrick Frost	RFA	April 2	Washington Redskins
LB	Warrick Holdman	UFA	April 26	Denver Broncos
TE	Brian Kozlowski	UFA		
OT	Jim Molinaro	RFA	March 21	Dallas Cowboys
LB	Jeff Posey	UFA		
OL	Mike Pucillo	UFA	February 28	Washington Redskins
OT	Todd Wade	UFA	March 14	Washington Redskins
CB	Kenny Wright	UFA	March 4	Cleveland Browns
TE	Todd Yoder	UFA	March 13	Washington Redskins

== 2007 NFL draft ==
2006 Washington Redskins draft
Round	Pick	Player	Position	College	Notes
1	6	LaRon Landry *	S	LSU	
5	143	Dallas Sartz	LB	USC	
6	179	H. B. Blades	LB	Pittsburgh	
6	205	Jordan Palmer	QB	UTEP	From Chicago
7	216	Tyler Ecker	TE	Michigan	
Made roster † Pro Football Hall of Fame * Made at least one Pro Bowl during career

== Roster ==
2007 Washington Redskins roster
Quarterbacks (QB): 8 Mark Brunell; 17 Jason Campbell; 15 Todd Collins; 3 Sam Hollenbach; Running backs (RB): 46 Ladell Betts; 31 Rock Cartwright; 26 Clinton Portis; 45 Mike Sellers; Wide receivers (WR): 86 Reche Caldwell; 80 Keenan McCardell; 19 Anthony Mix; 89 Santana Moss; 82 Antwaan Randle El; 83 James Thrash; Tight ends (TE): 47 Chris Cooley; 41 Brian Kozlowski; 87 Todd Yoder	Offensive linemen (OL): 75 Rick DeMulling G; 69 Jason Fabini G; 74 Stephon Heyer T; 66 Pete Kendall G; 61 Casey Rabach C; 78 Kevin Sampson T; 60 Chris Samuels T; 71 Todd Wade T; Defensive linemen (DL): 79 Lorenzo Alexander DT; 73 Ryan Boschetti DT; 90 Alex Buzbee DE; 99 Andre Carter DE; 93 Phillip Daniels DE; 92 Demetric Evans DE; 64 Kedric Golston DT; 96 Cornelius Griffin DT; 94 Anthony Montgomery DT; 95 Chris Wilson DE	Linebackers (LB): 54 H. B. Blades OLB; 50 Khary Campbell MLB; 59 London Fletcher MLB; 57 Randall Godfrey OLB; 58 Matt Sinclair OLB; 53 Marcus Washington OLB; Defensive backs (DB): 37 Reed Doughty FS; 39 Vernon Fox FS/SS; 30 LaRon Landry SS; 38 David Macklin CB; 20 Pierson Prioleau FS/SS; 27 Fred Smoot CB; 24 Shawn Springs CB; 23 Omar Stoutmire FS/SS; 29 Leigh Torrence CB; Special teams (ST): 67 Ethan Albright LS; 4 Derrick Frost P; 6 Shaun Suisham K	Practice squad: -- Calvin Armstrong T; -- Cody Boyd TE; 72 Tommy Davis DE; 68 Justin Geisinger G; 32 Marcus Mason RB; 18 Burl Toler WR; 51 Danny Verdun-Wheeler LB; 34 Byron Westbrook CB; Reserve: 36 Nehemiah Broughton FB (IR); 88 Tyler Ecker TE (IR); 11 Mike Espy WR (IR); 12 Steven Harris WR (IR); 76 Jon Jansen T (IR); 85 Brandon Lloyd WR (IR); 52 Rocky McIntosh LB (IR); 62 Mike Pucillo C (IR); 22 Carlos Rogers CB (IR); 77 Randy Thomas G (IR); -- Ross Tucker C/G (IR); Rookies in italics 53 active, 11 reserve, 8 practice squad

== Preseason ==
=== Schedule ===
Week	Date	Opponent	Result	Record	Game site	NFL.com recap
1	August 11	at Tennessee Titans	W 14–6	1–0	LP Field	Recap
2	August 18	Pittsburgh Steelers	L 10–12	1–1	FedExField	Recap
3	August 25	Baltimore Ravens	W 13–7	2–1	FedExField	Recap
4	August 30	at Jacksonville Jaguars	L 14–31	2–2	Jacksonville Municipal Stadium	Recap

=== Week 1: at Tennessee Titans ===
Quarter	1	2	3	4	Total
Redskins	0	0	0	14	14
Titans	3	0	0	3	6

at LP Field, Nashville, Tennessee

- Game time: 8:00 p.m. EST
- Game weather: 93 °F (34 °C), hot and clear
- Game attendance: 69,143

The Redskins started their first preseason against the Tennessee Titans on the road on August 11. The Redskins defense allowed only six points and caused four fumbles, one of which they recovered. Many were surprised to see the Redskins' Quarterback Jason Campbell play the whole 1st half. Campbell wasn't productive, fumbled twice, and didn't score any touchdowns. The Redskins scored two late touchdowns in the last 1:17 to win the game. Marcus Mason scored a 1-yard rushing touchdown, and Byron Westbrook recovered a fumble in the endzone.GameBook

=== Week 2: vs. Pittsburgh Steelers ===
Quarter	1	2	3	4	Total
Steelers	0	3	0	9	12
Redskins	7	0	3	0	10

at FedExField, Landover, Maryland

- Game time: 8:00 p.m. EST
- Game weather: 79 °F (26 °C), clear
- Game attendance: 69,322

In the Redskins' second preseason game, they scored first but not without having a scare first. On their second drive, Quarterbacks Jason Campbell was tackled at the knee while throwing a complete 29-yard pass to tight end Chris Cooley—Campbell hobbled off the field with a bruised knee. Todd Collins took over for Campbell with some early success in the game; he threw a 7-yard touchdown pass to Brandon Lloyd. The Redskins had four goal-line stands, and only allowed 12 points (four field goals). However, their offense struggled to really got back into the swing of things without Campbell; their only other score of the game was a field goal. The Redskins' sustained some injuries during the game: linebacker Marcus Washington suffered a dislocated elbow, and wide receiver Mike Espy ruptured his tendon and subsequently was out for the season due to the injury. GameBook

=== Week 3: vs. Baltimore Ravens ===
Quarter	1	2	3	4	Total
Ravens	0	7	0	0	7
Redskins	3	3	7	0	13

at FedExField, Landover, Maryland

- Game time: 8:00 p.m. EST
- Game weather: 75 °F (24 °C), rain
- Game attendance: 60,080

Due to severe thunderstorms, the Redskins' third preseason game was shortened at the 11:38 mark in the third quarter. The kickoff was delayed over an hour and the game started at 9:12. The Redskins scored first in the game. Shaun Suisham had two field goals. The Redskins' defense looked great the whole night, only allowing the Ravens to a touchdown. In the third quarter, linebacker Dallas Sartz intercepted a Kyle Boller pass and ran it back for a touchdown. The game ended shortly thereafter. GameBook

=== Week 4: at Jacksonville Jaguars ===
Quarter	1	2	3	4	Total
Redskins	7	7	0	0	14
Jaguars	0	10	14	7	31

at Jacksonville Municipal Stadium, Jacksonville, Florida

- Game time: 7:30 p.m. EST
- Game weather: 89 °F (32 °C), chance of rain
- Game attendance: 63,953

The Redskins started their last preseason game strong. The defense forced a 3-and-out on Jacksonville's first drive and the Redskins scored on their first possession. Jason Campbell finished the game with 5 of 5 completions and a touchdown to Antwaan Randle El. Mark Brunell also threw a touchdown pass to Ryan Hoag. Though the Redskins were leading at halftime, they did not score again for the rest of the game. They eventually gave up three more touchdowns as the Jaguars rallied past the Redskins' backups. GameBook

== Regular season ==
=== Schedule ===
Week	Date	Opponent	Result	Record	Game site	NFL.com recap
1	September 9	Miami Dolphins	W 16–13 (OT)	1–0	FedExField	Recap
2	September 17	at Philadelphia Eagles	W 20–12	2–0	Lincoln Financial Field	Recap
3	September 23	New York Giants	L 17–24	2–1	FedExField	Recap
4	Bye					
5	October 7	Detroit Lions	W 34–3	3–1	FedExField	Recap
6	October 14	at Green Bay Packers	L 14–17	3–2	Lambeau Field	Recap
7	October 21	Arizona Cardinals	W 21–19	4–2	FedExField	Recap
8	October 28	at New England Patriots	L 7–52	4–3	Gillette Stadium	Recap
9	November 4	at New York Jets	W 23–20 (OT)	5–3	The Meadowlands	Recap
10	November 11	Philadelphia Eagles	L 25–33	5–4	FedExField	Recap
11	November 18	at Dallas Cowboys	L 23–28	5–5	Texas Stadium	Recap
12	November 25	at Tampa Bay Buccaneers	L 13–19	5–6	Raymond James Stadium	Recap
13	December 2	Buffalo Bills	L 16–17	5–7	FedExField	Recap
14	December 6	Chicago Bears	W 24–16	6–7	FedExField	Recap
15	December 16	at New York Giants	W 22–10	7–7	Giants Stadium	Recap
16	December 23	at Minnesota Vikings	W 32–21	8–7	Hubert H. Humphrey Metrodome	Recap
17	December 30	Dallas Cowboys	W 27–6	9–7	FedExField	Recap

=== Standings ===
NFC East
	W	L	T	PCT	DIV	CONF	PF	PA	STK
^{(1)} Dallas Cowboys	13	3	0	.813	4–2	10–2	455	325	L1
^{(5)} New York Giants	10	6	0	.625	3–3	7–5	373	351	L1
^{(6)} Washington Redskins	9	7	0	.563	3–3	7–5	334	310	W4
Philadelphia Eagles	8	8	0	.500	2–4	5–7	336	300	W3

=== Week 1: vs. Miami Dolphins ===
Quarter	1	2	3	4	OT	Total
Dolphins	0	7	3	3	0	13
Redskins	0	3	7	3	3	16

at FedExField, Landover, Maryland

- Game time: 1:00 p.m. EST
- Game weather: 82 °F (28 °C), sunny
- Game attendance: 90,163
- Referee: Gene Steratore
- TV announcers (CBS): Greg Gumbel (play-by-play) and Dan Dierdorf (color commentator)

The Redskins scored the first points of the game when Shaun Suisham kicked a 31-yard field goal in the second quarter. On the last play of the 1st half, Trent Green threw a 1-yard pass to Justin Peelle to claim the lead. The Redskins started the third quarter with Clinton Portis running for a 19-yard touchdown. Miami later answered with a field goal to tie the game. In the 4th quarter, both teams scored a field goal and the game went into overtime. Washington won the coin toss. They ran the ball down to Miami's 22-yard line, and Shaun Suisham made a game-winning 39-yard field goal. Clinton Portis finished the game with 17 carries, 98 yards, and a touchdown. The Redskins lost right tackle Jon Jansen for the year when he fractured his ankle in the second quarter. As of 2025, this is Washington's last win over MiamiGameBook

=== Week 2: at Philadelphia Eagles ===
Quarter	1	2	3	4	Total
Redskins	3	7	3	7	20
Eagles	0	6	3	3	12

at Lincoln Financial Field, Philadelphia, Pennsylvania

- Game time: 8:30 p.m. EST
- Game weather: 58 °F (14 °C)
- Game attendance: 67,726
- Referee: Bill Carollo
- TV announcers (ESPN): Mike Tirico (play-by-play), Ron Jaworski and Tony Kornheiser (color commentators)

The Redskins' second regular season game, against the Philadelphia Eagles, started off with a Redskins field goal at the end of the first quarter. Less than five minutes into the second quarter, the Eagles scored a field goal to tie the game at 3-3. A few minutes later, the Eagles scored another field goal to take the lead 6–3, the only lead the Eagles produced for the entire game. Just before halftime, Jason Campbell hit Chris Cooley for a touchdown to end the first half up 10–6.

In the third quarter, the Eagles and Redskins both scored another field goal, bringing the score to 13–9 prior to a Redskins drive that began with 1:15 remaining in the third quarter. That eventually led to Clinton Portis running for a six-yard touchdown early in the 4th quarter, bringing the score to 20–9.

The Eagles, with a field goal late in the 4th quarter, were down by 8 as they drove down to the Redskins 9-yard line. The Eagles' drive stalled and they turned the ball over on downs with an incomplete pass. With possession on their own 9-yard line, the Redskins ran out the clock on their way to a victory. The final score was 20–12.

=== Week 3: vs. New York Giants ===
Quarter	1	2	3	4	Total
Giants	3	0	7	14	24
Redskins	7	10	0	0	17

at FedExField, Landover, Maryland

- Game weather: 82 °F (28 °C) (Sunny)
- Game attendance: 90,803
- Referee: Walt Coleman
- TV announcers (Fox): Joe Buck (play-by-play), Troy Aikman (color commentator), & Pam Oliver (sideline reporter)

In the first quarter, the Redskins trailed early as The New York Giants kicker Lawrence Tynes got a 34-yard field goal. The Redskins took the lead with running back Clinton Portis getting a 1-yard touchdown run. In the second quarter, quarter back Jason Campbell completed an 8-yard touchdown pass to tight end Chris Cooley, while kicker Shaun Suisham made a 47-yard field goal. In the third quarter, Giants running back Reuben Droughns made a 1-yard touchdown run for the only score that quarter. In the fourth quarter, the Giants took the lead with Droughns getting another 1-yard touchdown run, while quarter back Eli Manning completed a 33-yard touchdown pass to wide receiver Plaxico Burress. The Redskins managed to get a late-game drive, but it ended up with running back Ladell Betts getting taken down at the Giant's 1-yard line on 4th & Goal.

With the loss, the Redskins fell to 2–1 entering their bye week.

=== Week 5: vs. Detroit Lions ===
Quarter	1	2	3	4	Total
Lions	0	0	3	0	3
Redskins	0	14	2	18	34

at FedExField, Landover, Maryland

- Game weather: 89 °F (32 °C) (sunny)
- Game attendance: 88,944
- Referee: Ed Hochuli
- TV announcers (Fox): Sam Rosen (play-by-play) and Tim Ryan (color commentator)

Coming off their bye week, the Redskins stayed at home for a Week 5 duel with the Detroit Lions. The Lions at that time had never beaten the Redskins in Washington, D.C. Though the first quarter was scoreless, the Redskins began a 14-play 80-yard drive that finished with a 7-yard touchdown pass from Jason Campbell to Chris Cooley. The Redskins' next possession began at their own 17-yard line: in summary, an 83-yard drive in 7 plays, culminating in a touchdown for Mike Sellers in a 1-yard rushing play. The first half ended with the Redskins up, 14–0. With 2:27 left in the third quarter, the Lions scored their first and only points with a 39-yard field goal to bring the score to 14–3. The Redskins' next drive was only 9 yards and resulted in a punt, but put the Lions on their own 8-yard line. After a rushing play that resulted in a loss of 1 yard, the Redskins sacked Lions' quarterback Jon Kitna in the end zone for a safety, increasing the Redskins' lead to 13 with a score of 16–3 to end the third quarter. After a fourth-quarter fumble by Redskins' running back Clinton Portis, the Lions took possession at their own 10-yard line. The Lions drove 26 yards before punting to James Thrash, who returned the punt for 62 yards and fumbled towards the end zone, where Rock Cartwright recovered the ball on the 3-yard line. After a Redskins' five-yard penalty, Redskins quarterback Jason Campbell threw an 8-yard touchdown pass to Mike Sellers and then converted a two-point attempt with a pass to Chris Cooley bringing the score to 24–3. Detroit's next possession ended with an interception by safety Sean Taylor for a 35-yard return which later helped the Redskins finish a drive with a field goal. With less than 3 minutes in the fourth quarter, the Lions began a drive at their own 43-yard line. After gaining 14 yards, Jon Kitna threw an interception to cornerback Carlos Rogers, who returned it 61 yards for a touchdown for the final score of the game.

With the win, the Redskins improved to 3–1.

=== Week 6: at Green Bay Packers ===
Quarter	1	2	3	4	Total
Redskins	7	7	0	0	14
Packers	7	0	10	0	17

at Lambeau Field, Green Bay, Wisconsin

- Game weather: 47 °F (8 °C) (rain)
- Game attendance: 70,761
- Referee: Terry McAulay
- TV announcers (Fox): Kenny Albert (play-by-play) and Troy Aikman (color commentator)

Coming off their dominating home win over the Lions, the Redskins flew to Lambeau Field for a Week 6 inter-conference duel with the Green Bay Packers. In the first quarter, Washington trailed early as Packers running back DeShawn Wynn managed to get a 3-yard touchdown run. The Redskins responded with quarterback Jason Campbell getting a 6-yard touchdown run. In the second quarter, the Redskins took the lead as Campbell completed a 14-yard touchdown pass to tight end Chris Cooley for the only score in the quarter.

In the third quarter, Washington struggled as Packers' kicker Mason Crosby got a 37-yard field goal, while cornerback Charles Woodson returned a fumble 57 yards for a touchdown. Afterwards, in the fourth quarter, the Packers held on for the win.

With the loss, the Redskins fell to 3–2.

=== Week 7: vs. Arizona Cardinals ===
Quarter	1	2	3	4	Total
Cardinals	0	6	0	13	19
Redskins	7	7	7	0	21

at FedExField, Landover, Maryland

- Game weather: 75 °F (24 °C) (sunny)
- Game attendance: 85,640
- Referee: Jeff Triplette
- TV announcers (Fox): Sam Rosen (play-by-play) and Tim Ryan (color commentator)

Trying to rebound from their road loss to the Packers, the Redskins went home for a Week 7 match-up against the Arizona Cardinals. In the first quarter, Washington took the early lead with running back Clinton Portis getting a 2-yard touchdown run for the only score of the quarter. In the second quarter, the Redskins increased its lead with linebacker London Fletcher returning an interception 27 yards for a touchdown. The Cardinals scored as quarterback Kurt Warner completed a 2-yard touchdown pass to wide receiver Anquan Boldin (with a failed PAT).

In the third quarter, Washington increased its lead with Portis getting a 1-yard touchdown run for the only score of the quarter. In the fourth quarter, the Cardinals managed to get within striking distance as quarterback Warner and wide receiver Boldin hooked up on a 10-yard touchdown pass. Afterwards, the Cardinals got within two points with quarterback Tim Rattay completing a 1-yard touchdown pass to tight end Leonard Pope (with a failed 2-point conversion). Later, the Cardinals managed to recover its onside kick and managed to set up a game-winning 55-yard field goal. Fortunately for the Redskins the Cardinals' kick missed wide left—securing the victory.

With the win, the Redskins improved to 4–2.

=== Week 8: at New England Patriots ===
Quarter	1	2	3	4	Total
Redskins	0	0	0	7	7
Patriots	7	17	14	14	52

at Gillette Stadium, Foxborough, Massachusetts

- Game time: 4:15 p.m. EST
- Game weather: 55 °F (13 °C), clear & windy
- Game attendance: 68,756
- Referee: Larry Nemmers
- TV announcers (Fox): Kenny Albert (play-by-play) and Troy Aikman (color commentator)

Coming off The Redskins' home win over the Cardinals, they traveled to Gillette Stadium for a Week 8 inter-conference duel with the undefeated New England Patriots. In the first quarter, Washington trailed early as New England Patriots quarterback Tom Brady got a 3-yard touchdown run for the only score of the period. In the second quarter, the Redskins continued to fall behind as Brady completed a 2-yard touchdown pass to linebacker Mike Vrabel, kicker Stephen Gostkowski nailed a 36-yard field goal, and Brady pulled a "Marino"—by doing a fake spike and then completing a 6-yard touchdown pass to wide receiver Randy Moss.

In the third quarter, Washington's deficit increased when Brady got a 2-yard touchdown run, along with linebacker Rosevelt Colvin returning a fumble 11 yards for a touchdown. In the fourth quarter, the Patriots finished their job with Brady completing a 2-yard touchdown pass to wide receiver Wes Welker, along with back-up quarterback Matt Cassel getting a 15-yard touchdown run. Afterwards, the Redskins got their only score of the game when quarterback Jason Campbell completed a 15-yard touchdown pass to tight end Chris Cooley.

With the loss, not only did the Redskins fall to 4–3, but the Redskins allowed the most points in a single game since 1961 (53 points to the New York Giants).

=== Week 9: at New York Jets ===
Quarter	1	2	3	4	OT	Total
Redskins	3	6	3	8	3	23
Jets	10	7	0	3	0	20

at The Meadowlands, East Rutherford, New Jersey

- Game time: 1:00 p.m. EST
- Game weather: 55 °F (13 °C)
- Game attendance: 76,663
- Referee: Ron Winter
- TV announcers (Fox): Kenny Albert, Daryl Johnston, and Tony Siragusa

Coming off a humiliating road loss to the Patriots, the Redskins traveled to The Meadowlands for a Week 9 inter-conference duel with the New York Jets. In the first quarter, Washington immediately trailed as Jets running back/return specialist Leon Washington returned the opening kickoff 86 yards for a touchdown. The Redskins managed to respond with kicker Shaun Suisham's successful try at a 46-yard field goal, yet the Jets answered with their kicker Mike Nugent getting a 29-yard field goal. In the second quarter, the Jets increased their lead with quarterback Kellen Clemens completing a 1-yard touchdown pass to tight end Joe Kowalewski. The Redskins ended the half with Suisham getting a 40-yard and a 22-yard field goal.

In the third quarter, the Redskins drew closer with Suisham kicking a 40-yard field goal for the only score of the quarter. In the fourth quarter, the Redskins took the lead with running back Clinton Portis getting a 1-yard touchdown run, along with quarterback Jason Campbell's 2-point conversion pass to wide receiver Antwaan Randle El. The Jets managed to force an overtime with Nugent getting a 30-yard field goal. In overtime, the Redskins managed to come out on top as Suisham nailed the game-winning 46-yard field goal.

With the win, the Redskins improved to 5–3. The victory also improved Head Coach Joe Gibbs's overtime record to 10–3.

=== Week 10: vs. Philadelphia Eagles ===
Quarter	1	2	3	4	Total
Eagles	7	0	6	20	33
Redskins	0	12	3	10	25

at FedExField, Landover, Maryland

- Game time: 1:00 p.m. EST
- Game weather: 49 °F (9 °C) (Sunny)
- Game attendance: 90,218
- Referee: John Parry
- TV announcers (Fox): Kenny Albert (play-by-play), Daryl Johnston (color commentator) and Tony Siragusa (sideline reporter)

Coming off their overtime road win over the Jets, the Redskins went home for an NFC East rematch with the Philadelphia Eagles. In the first quarter, the Redskins trailed early as Eagles quarterback Donovan McNabb completed a 4-yard touchdown pass to running back Brian Westbrook for the only score in the quarter. In the second quarter, the Redskins took the lead when quarterback Jason Campbell hooked up with wide receiver James Thrash on a 4-yard touchdown pass (with a failed PAT) and a 12-yard touchdown pass (with a failed 2-point conversion).

In the third quarter, the Redskins increased their lead with kicker Shaun Suisham getting a 23-yard field goal. Philadelphia managed to draw close with McNabb completing an 8-yard touchdown pass to tight end L.J. Smith (with a failed 2-point conversion). In the fourth quarter, the Redskins padded its lead with Campbell completing a 6-yard touchdown pass to wide receiver Keenan McCardell, yet the Eagles answered with McNabb's 45-yard touchdown pass to wide receiver Reggie Brown. The Redskins tried to pull away as Suisham nailed a 21-yard field goal. However, Philadelphia sealed the win with Westbrook turning a 57-yard reception and a 10-yard run into touchdowns.

With the loss, the Redskins fell to 5–4. This was Sean Taylor's last game that he ever played; he sustained an injury that kept him from playing in the last two games before his death.

=== Week 11: at Dallas Cowboys ===
Quarter	1	2	3	4	Total
Redskins	7	3	3	10	23
Cowboys	0	7	7	14	28

at Texas Stadium, Irving, Texas

- Game time: 4:15 p.m. EST
- Game weather: 77 °F (25 °C)
- Game attendance: 63,706
- Referee: Walt Anderson
- TV announcers (Fox): Joe Buck (play-by-play), Troy Aikman (color commentator), & Pam Oliver (sideline reporter)

Hoping to rebound from their divisional home loss to the Eagles, the Redskins traveled to Texas Stadium for a Week 11 NFC East showdown with the Dallas Cowboys. In the first quarter, the Redskins struck first when quarterback Jason Campbell completed a 19-yard touchdown pass to tight end Chris Cooley for the only score in the quarter. In the second quarter, the Cowboys tied the game with quarterback Tony Romo completing a 4-yard touchdown pass to wide receiver Terrell Owens. Afterwards, the Redskins took the lead into halftime as kicker Shaun Suisham managed to get a 45-yard field goal.

In the third quarter, the Cowboys took the lead as Romo hooked up with Owens again for a 31-yard touchdown pass. the Redskins' response was Suisham kicking a 39-yard field goal. In the fourth quarter, the Cowboys added onto their lead as Romo and Owens hooked up for a third time on a 46-yard touchdown pass, the Redskins' answer; Suisham kicking a 44-yard field goal. Unfortunately for the Redskins, the Cowboys managed to put the game out of reach with Romo and Owens hooking up for the fourth time on a 52-yard touchdown pass. The Redskins' only response was Campbell's 5-yard touchdown pass to wide receiver Santana Moss.

With the loss, the Redskins fell to 5–5.

=== Week 12: at Tampa Bay Buccaneers ===
Quarter	1	2	3	4	Total
Redskins	0	3	7	3	13
Buccaneers	10	9	0	0	19

at Raymond James Stadium, Tampa, Florida

- Game time: 1:00 p.m. EST
- Game weather: 81 °F (27 °C) (Partly Cloudy)
- Game attendance: 65,596
- Referee: Ed Hochuli
- TV announcers (Fox): Sam Rosen (play-by-play), Tim Ryan (color commentator), & Chris Myers (sideline reporter)

Trying to snap a two-game losing skid, the Redskins traveled to Raymond James Stadium for a Week 12 battled with the Tampa Bay Buccaneers. In the first quarter, the Redskins trailed early as Buccaneers running back Earnest Graham got a 1-yard touchdown run, along with kicker Matt Bryant getting a 35-yard field goal. In the second quarter, the Redskins continued to struggle as Bryant gave the Buccaneers a 27-yard field goal and a 48-yard field goal. The Redskins got their only score of the half with kicker Shaun Suisham getting a 43-yard field goal.

In the third quarter, the Redskins started to mount a comeback as quarterback Jason Campbell completed a 39-yard touchdown pass to tight end Chris Cooley for the only score of the quarter. In the fourth quarter, the Redskins managed to creep closer as Suisham nailed a 38-yard field goal. However, the Buccaneers' defense held on to secure the win.

With their third-straight loss, the Redskins fell to 5–6.

In the game, the Redskins were plagued with 6 turnovers (2 interceptions and 4 lost fumbles), which was the most the Redskins had ever given up in a single game since playing the Giants in 2004 (the Redskins had given up 7 turnovers in that game).

Chris Cooley had a total of 24 touchdown receptions since 2004 (the most by an NFC tight end).

==== Death of Sean Taylor ====
On November 26, 2007, Sean Taylor was at home resting a knee injury that had kept him off the field for the previous two games. At 1:45 a.m., he was shot in the upper leg by an armed intruder, critically wounding him by severing his femoral artery. His girlfriend tried to call the police from the house line but experienced difficulty calling. Initial reports mistakenly suggested that the phone line had been cut. Taylor's girlfriend called 911 from her mobile phone, which delayed response time.

Taylor was airlifted to the Ryder Trauma Center at Jackson Memorial Hospital, where he underwent surgery. He lost a significant amount of blood and remained unconscious and in a coma. Taylor's doctors speculated that he had suffered brain damage from the blood loss. An unnamed Redskins source reported that Taylor's heart stopped twice during the surgery. Washington running back Clinton Portis, a former college teammate, and team owner Dan Snyder remained at the hospital until Taylor's death. In the early morning of November 27, 2007, Taylor died at the hospital.

Taylor was posthumously elected to the starting free safety position for the NFC Pro Bowl team.

=== Week 13: vs. Buffalo Bills ===
Quarter	1	2	3	4	Total
Bills	0	2	6	9	17
Redskins	3	6	7	0	16

at FedExField, Landover, Maryland

- Game time: 1:00 PM EST
- Game weather: 40 °F (4 °C) (Cloudy)
- Game attendance: 85,831
- Referee: Tony Corrente
- TV announcers (CBS): Ian Eagle (play-by-play) & Solomon Wilcots (color commentator)

Just days after teammate Sean Taylor died of his injuries, the Redskins tried to snap a three-game skid at home against the Buffalo Bills. Before the kickoff, the stadium held a memorial service for Taylor, and players across the NFL wore a #21 sticker on the back of their helmets. The Redskins fielded only 10 players for their first defensive play in Taylor's honor.

In the first quarter, the Redskins took the early lead as Shaun Suisham kicked a 27-yard field goal. In the second quarter, the Redskins increased their lead as Suisham kicked a 28-yard field goal. Later, the Bills got on the board as linebacker Angelo Crowell sacked quarterback Jason Campbell in his end zone for a safety. The Redskins ended the half as Suisham kicked a 33-yard field goal.

In the third quarter, the Bills drew closer as kicker Rian Lindell managed to get a 38-yard field goal. Later, the Redskins responded with running back Clinton Portis getting a 3-yard touchdown run. Afterwards, the Bills ended the half as Lindell kicked a 43-yard field goal. In the fourth quarter, the Bills drew closer as Lindell kicked a 24-yarder, along with a 33-yard field goal. Later, the Bills got into position to kick a 51-yard field goal. They got the kick, but Head Coach Joe Gibbs called timeout. When the Bills tried to kick again, Gibbs called timeout again, incurring an unsportsmanlike conduct penalty which not only moved the Bills 15 yards closer to their end zone but reduced Lindell's field goal attempt to 36 yards. Afterwards, the Bills ended the game with Lindell nailing the game-winning 36-yard field goal.

With their fourth-straight loss, Washington fell to 5–7.

=== Week 14: vs. Chicago Bears ===
Quarter	1	2	3	4	Total
Bears	0	0	10	6	16
Redskins	0	7	7	10	24

at FedExField, Landover, Maryland

- Game time: 8:00 PM EDT/7:00 PM CDT
- Game weather: 26 °F (−3 °C) (Clear)
- Game attendance: 82,213
- Referee: Jerome Boger
- TV announcers (NFL Network): Bryant Gumbel (play-by-play) and Cris Collinsworth (color commentator)

Coming off a home loss to the Bills (along with attending Sean Taylor's funeral in Florida), the Redskins played at home for their Week 13 Thursday night inter-conference game with the Chicago Bears. After a scoreless first quarter, the Redskins scored first when quarterback Todd Collins completed a 21-yard touchdown pass to tight end Todd Yoder for the only score of the second quarter.

In the third quarter, Washington's fullback Mike Sellers scored on a 1-yard touchdown run. The Bears replied with kicker Robbie Gould making a 30-yard field goal, and later quarterback Brian Griese completed a 17-yard touchdown pass to wide receiver Bernard Berrian. In the fourth quarter, the Redskins responded with kicker Shaun Suisham kicking a 23-yard field goal. Later, Chicago made it closer as Gould kicked a 22-yard field goal. Afterwards, the Redskins increased their lead with Collins completing a 16-yard touchdown pass to running back Ladell Betts. The Bears answered with Gould making a 21-yard field goal, but their onside kick failed, which preserved a Washington win.

With the win, the Redskins improved to 6–7.

Starting quarterback Jason Campbell (10/16 for 100 yards) left the game in the second quarter with a dislocated left knee cap.

=== Week 15: at New York Giants ===
Quarter	1	2	3	4	Total
Redskins	3	13	6	0	22
Giants	0	3	7	0	10

at Giants Stadium, East Rutherford, New Jersey

- Game time: 8:15 PM
- Game weather: 36 °F (2 °C) (Cloudy & Windy)
- Game attendance: 77,899
- Referee: Peter Morelli
- TV: NBC Announcers= Al Michaels (play-by-play), John Madden (color commentator), & Andrea Kremer (sideline reporter)

Coming off their home win over the Chicago Bears, the Redskins traveled to Giants Stadium for a Week 15 Sunday night NFC East rematch with the New York Giants. Quarterback Todd Collins made his first start since 1997.

In the first quarter, the Redskins drew first blood when the kicker Shaun Suisham nailed a 49-yard field goal for the only score of the quarter. In the second quarter, the Redskins increased its lead with Suisham kicking a 31-yard field goal, and to add to it after with running back Ladell Betts getting a 14-yard touchdown run. The Giants got on the board with kicker Lawrence Tynes getting a 35-yard field goal. The Redskins ended the half with Suisham nailing a 28-yard field goal.

In the third quarter, the Redskins continued its dominance with running back Clinton Portis gets a 5-yard touchdown run. The Giants tried to rally as quarterback Eli Manning completed a 19-yard touchdown pass to tight end Kevin Boss. Afterwards, the Redskins' defense (along with the wind) held the Giants in check.

With the win, the Redskins improved to 7–7.

=== Week 16: at Minnesota Vikings ===
Quarter	1	2	3	4	Total
Redskins	9	13	3	7	32
Vikings	0	0	7	14	21

at Hubert H. Humphrey Metrodome, Minneapolis, Minnesota

- Game time: 8:15 PM
- Game weather: Indoors, (17 °F (−8 °C) with flurries outside)
- Game attendance: 63,634
- Referee: Bill Leavy
- TV announcers: Al Michaels (play-by-play), John Madden (color commentator), & Andrea Kremer (sideline reporter)

This game was a must-win for the Redskins in order to maintain their playoff hopes. During the first quarter, the Redskins appeared to be in the position to score after Fred Smoot intercepted Tarvaris Jackson and returned the interception deep into Viking territory. However, the Redskins' offense was unable to score a touchdown. Mike Sellers appeared to score a touchdown on 4th and goal, but a replay challenge by Brad Childress nullified the touchdown and gave the Vikings the ball. However, the Redskins immediately tackled Tony Richardson in the end zone for a safety. Following the subsequent free kick, the Redskins marched down the field and took a 9–0 lead on a 33-yard pass from Todd Collins to Chris Cooley.

In the 2nd quarter, the Redskins expanded their lead to 16–0 on a 32-yard pass from Todd Collins to Santana Moss. Later in the quarter, the Redskins took a 22–0 lead when Clinton Portis took a handoff from Todd Collins and threw a 15-yard touchdown pass to Antwaan Randle El in the end zone. Although the Redskins were not successful on the 2-point conversion attempt, they had a commanding lead at this point in the game, and the previously rowdy Metrodome crowd was very disheartened and silent at this point.

The Redskins stretched their lead to 25–0 on a 26-yard field goal by Shaun Suisham. Later in the quarter, the Vikings got the crowd back in the game when Tarvaris Jackson threw a 2-yard touchdown pass to Jim Kleinsasser, cutting the Redskins' lead to 25–7.

The Vikings further cut into the Redskins' lead around the 10-minute mark of the fourth quarter when Tarvaris Jackson scored on a 6-yard run, making the lead 25–14. The Metrodome crowd began sensing a comeback as momentum appeared to turn in the Vikings' favor. This came to a head midway through the fourth quarter when the Redskins appeared to complete a long pass to Santana Moss. Though initially ruled a catch by a referee on the sideline, the call was considered questionable by the game's announcers since Moss had to drag his toes to stay in-bounds as he caught the pass. Sensing an impending challenge by Childress, the Redskins raced down the field to snap the ball—since a play cannot be challenged after the ball has been snapped for the next play. However, the snap was fumbled and it appeared to be Vikings' ball after it was recovered by Vikings' defensive tackle Kevin Williams.

As the Vikings rushed onto the field to take over on offense, coach Joe Gibbs challenged that Minnesota had twelve defensive players on the field at the time the Redskins snapped the ball and fumbled it. After review, Gibbs' challenge was upheld and the call on the field was reversed—a five-yard penalty was assessed to the Vikings for having too many men on the field and the Redskins maintained possession. After the Redskins had retain possession of the football they had eventually scored on a 13-yard touchdown run by Clinton Portis, making the score 32–14 capping off a 75-yard drive. Although Tarvaris Jackson later scored on a 1-yard touchdown run to make the score 32–21, the Vikings were unable to score again, and the Redskins emerged with a victory. This enabled them to ensure that they will be able to control their own "destiny" to make the playoffs.

=== Week 17: vs. Dallas Cowboys ===
Quarter	1	2	3	4	Total
Cowboys	0	3	0	3	6
Redskins	7	6	7	7	27

at FedExField, Landover, Maryland

- Game time: 4:15 PM
- Game weather: 39 °F (4 °C) (Rain)
- Game attendance: 90,910
- Referee: Scott Green
- TV announcers: Joe Buck (play by play) and Troy Aikman (color commentator)

Needing a win (or losses by the Vikings & Saints) to secure a playoff berth, the Redskins closed out the regular season at home with an NFC East rematch with the Dallas Cowboys. In the first quarter, the Redskins got off to a fast start with running back Clinton Portis getting a 23-yard touchdown run for the only score of the quarter. In the second quarter, the Redskins increased its lead with kicker Shaun Suisham getting a 46-yard field goal. The Cowboys responded with kicker Nick Folk getting a 37-yard field goal. Afterwards, the Redskins closed out the half with Suisham nailing a 21-yard field goal.

In the third quarter, the Redskins increased its lead with Portis getting a 1-yard touchdown run for the only score of the quarter. In the fourth quarter, the Redskins closed out their divisional rival with quarterback Todd Collins completing a 42-yard touchdown pass to wide receiver Santana Moss. The Cowboys finished their game with Folk getting a 30-yard field goal.

With the win, not only did the Redskins close out the regular season at 9–7, but they also clinched the NFC's #6 seed and/or 2nd wild card playoff spot.

== Playoffs ==
=== Schedule ===
Week	Date	Opponent	Result	Record	Game site	NFL.com recap
WC	January 5	at Seattle Seahawks (3)	L 14–35	0–1	Qwest Field	Recap

==== NFC: Seattle Seahawks 35, Washington Redskins 14 ====
Quarter	1	2	3	4	Total
Redskins	0	0	0	14	14
Seahawks	7	3	3	22	35

at Qwest Field, Seattle, Washington

- Game time: 4:35 p.m. EST/1:35 p.m. PST
- Game weather: Partly sunny, 42 °F (6 °C)
- Game attendance: 68,297
- Referee: Walt Coleman
- TV announcers (NBC): Tom Hammond (play-by-play), Cris Collinsworth (color commentator), and Bob Neumeier (sideline reporter)

Scoring

First quarter

- SEA – Leonard Weaver 17 yd TD run (Josh Brown kick), 3:45. Seahawks 7–0. Drive: 6 plays, 45 yards, 3:21.

Second quarter

- SEA – Josh Brown 50 yd FG, 8:58. Seahawks 10–0. Drive: 5 plays, 33 yards, 1:42.

Third quarter

- SEA – Josh Brown 33 yd FG, 4:30. Seahawks 13–0. Drive: 8 plays, 52 yards, 4:24.

Fourth quarter

- WAS – Antwaan Randle El 7 yd TD pass from Todd Collins (Shaun Suisham kick), 14:53. Seahawks 13–7. Drive: 12 plays, 84 yards, 4:37.
- WAS – Santana Moss 30 yd TD pass from Todd Collins (Shaun Suisham kick), 12:38. Redskins 14–13. Drive: 3 plays, 42 yards, 1:19.
- SEA – D.J. Hackett 20 yd TD pass from Matt Hasselbeck (Marcus Pollard pass from Matt Hasselbeck), 6:06. Seahawks 21–14. Drive: 5 plays, 42 yards, 1:57.
- SEA – Marcus Trufant 78 yd interception return TD (Josh Brown kick), 5:38. Seahawks 28–14.
- SEA – Jordan Babineaux 57 yd interception return TD (Josh Brown kick), 0:27. Seahawks 35–14.

== Statistics ==
Through Week 16

=== Passing ===
Player	G	QB Rat.	Comp.	Att.	Pct.	Yards	TD	INT	Long	Sack
Jason Campbell	13	77.6	250	417	60.0	2,700	12	11	54	21
Todd Collins	4	106.4	67	105	63.8	888	5	0	54	7
Antwaan Randle El	16	83.3	1	2	50.0	19	0	0	19	0
Clinton Portis	16	158.3	1	1	100.0	15	1	0	15	0

=== Rushing ===
Player	G	Att.	Yards	Y/G	Avg.	Long	TD	Fum	FumL
Clinton Portis	16	325	1,262	78.9	3.9	32	11		
Ladell Betts	16	93	335	20.9	3.6	20	1		
Jason Campbell	13	36	185	14.2	5.1	29	1	13	8
Mike Sellers	12	23	75	6.3	3.3	15	2	1	0
Santana Moss	12	3	13	1.1	4.3	11	0	2	2
Rock Cartwright	13	2	0	0.0	0.0	1	0	0	0
Todd Collins	2	3	−3	−1.5	−1.0	−1	0	1	1
Antwaan Randle El	13	4	−3	−0.2	−0.8	1	0	1	0

=== Receiving ===
Player	G	Rec.	Yards	Y/G	Avg.	Long	TD
Chris Cooley	16	66	786	49.1	11.9	39	8
Antwaan Randle El	16	51	728	45.5	14.3	54	1
Santana Moss	13	61	808	56.7	13.2	49	3
Clinton Portis	14	47	389	22.4	8.3	54	0
Keenan McCardell	9	22	256	28.4	11.6	32	1
Ladell Betts	14	21	174	12.1	8.3	28	1
Mike Sellers	12	17	117	9.5	6.9	24	1
James Thrash	10	9	107	11.9	12.6	31	2
Todd Yoder	14	7	97	6.9	13.9	30	1
Reche Caldwell	6	9	74	12.3	8.2	15	0
Brandon Lloyd	8	2	14	2.0	7.0	9	0

=== Kicking ===
Player	G	0–19	20–29	30–39	40–49	50+	FGM	FGA	Pct.	Long	XPM	XPA
Shaun Suisham	16	0–0	10–10	8–10	10–13	1–2	29	35	82.9	50	29	30

=== Punting ===
Player	G	Punt	Yards	Avg.	In20	In10	TB	Long
Derrick Frost	16	75	3,072	41.0	23	6	7	64

=== Defense ===
Player	G	Tackles	Asst.	TotalTK	Sack	YdL	INT	Yards	TD	FumR
London Fletcher	14	94	27	121	0	0	3	36	1	0
Rocky McIntosh	14	68	19	87	3.0	10	0	0	0	0
LaRon Landry	14	58	29	87	1.5	12	0	0	0	0
Shawn Springs	14	51	4	55	0	0	2	55	0	0
Andre Carter	14	38	12	50	10.5	65	0	0	0	0
Fred Smoot	11	38	5	43	0	0	0	0	0	0
Sean Taylor	9	32	10	42	0	0	5	98	0	0
Pierson Prioleau	14	30	14	44	0	0	0	0	0	0
Anthony Montgomery	14	28	8	36	0.5	4	0	0	0	0
Leigh Torrence	14	28	8	36	0	0	0	0	0	0
Reed Doughty	14	28	17	45	0.5	4	0	0	0	0
Marcus Washington	10	27	12	34	5.0	22	0	0	0	0
Cornelius Griffin	14	26	14	40	2.5	16	0	0	0	0
Phillip Daniels	13	22	12	34	2.5	10	0	0	0	0
Khary Campbell	14	21	5	26	0	0	0	0	0	0
Carlos Rogers	7	20	5	25	0	0	1	61	1	0
Demetric Evans	14	19	5	24	1.0	9	0	0	0	0
Randall Godfrey	9	13	3	16	0	0	0	0	0	0
H.B. Blades	14	9	3	12	0	0	0	0	0	0
Vernon Fox	12	7	0	7	0	0	0	0	0	0
Chris Wilson	14	7	2	9	2.0	20	0	0	0	0
Kedric Golston	13	7	4	11	1.0	0	0	0	0	0
David Macklin	4	6	0	6	0	0	0	0	0	0
Rock Cartwright	13	6	3	9	0	0	0	0	0	0
John Eubanks	6	6	1	7	0	0	0	0	0	0
Clinton Portis	14	5	0	5	0	0	0	0	0	0
James Thrash	10	5	1	6	0	0	0	0	0	0
Anthony Mix	3	4	0	4	0	0	0	0	0	0
Shaun Suisham	14	3	1	4	0	0	0	0	0	0
Chris Samuels	14	3	0	3	0	0	0	0	0	0
Jason Fabini	14	2	0	2	0	0	0	0	0	0
Matt Sinclair	2	2	0	2	0	0	0	0	0	0
Lorenzo Alexander	11	2	2	4	0	0	0	0	0	0
Casey Rabach	13	2	0	2	0	0	0	0	0	0
Santana Moss	12	2	0	2	0	0	0	0	0	0
Pete Kendall	14	2	0	2	0	0	0	0	0	0
Mike Sellers	12	1	0	1	0	0	0	0	0	0
Todd Yoder	14	1	1	2	0	0	0	0	0	0
Chris Cooley	14	1	0	1	0	0	0	0	0	0
Antwaan Randle El	13	1	0	1	0	0	0	0	0	0
Mike Pucillo	11	1	0	1	0	0	0	0	0	0
Todd Wade	10	1	0	1	0	0	0	0	0	0
