= Leigh Torrence =

American football player and coach (born 1982)

Personal information
- Born: January 4, 1982 (age 44); Atlanta, Georgia, U.S.
- Listed height: 5 ft 11 in (1.80 m)
- Listed weight: 179 lb (81 kg)

Career information
- High school: Marist (Brookhaven, Georgia)
- College: Stanford
- NFL draft: 2005: undrafted

Career history

Playing
- Green Bay Packers (2005)*; Atlanta Falcons (2005); Washington Redskins (2006–2008); New Orleans Saints (2008–2011); Washington Redskins (2012)*; Jacksonville Jaguars (2012)*
- * Offseason or practice squad member only

Coaching
- New Orleans Saints (2018–2019) Defensive assistant; New York Jets (2020) Assistant defensive backs coach

Awards and highlights
- Super Bowl champion (XLIV)

Career NFL statistics
- Total tackles: 134
- Sacks: 3.5
- Pass deflections: 9
- Interceptions: 2
- Defensive touchdowns: 1
- Stats at Pro Football Reference

Leigh Torrence (born January 4, 1982) is an American former professional football player who was a cornerback in the National Football League (NFL). He was signed by the Green Bay Packers as an undrafted free agent in 2005. He played college football for the Stanford Cardinal.

He was also a member of the Atlanta Falcons, Washington Redskins, New Orleans Saints, and Jacksonville Jaguars. After his playing career, he was an assistant coach for the Saints and New York Jets.

== Early life ==
Torrence attended Marist School near Atlanta, where he played football, ran track, and won two state tennis titles. At Stanford he won two letters in track and four in football, and was named to the Academic All-Pac-10 team.

== Professional career ==
=== Green Bay Packers ===
The Green Bay Packers signed Torrence April 29, 2005. The Packers released September 3, 2005.

=== Atlanta Falcons ===
The Atlanta Falcons claimed Torrence off waivers on September 4, 2005, and signed him to the practice squad. He was activated from the squad and promoted to the 53-man roster on October 12, 2005.

Torrence was waived on September 2, 2006.

=== Washington Redskins ===
The Washington Redskins signed Torrence on December 27, 2006. The team released him on November 8, 2008. During his first stint with the Redskins, Torrence played in 25 games and recorded 42 tackles, one sack, and two pass breakups.

=== New Orleans Saints ===
With the Saints in 2009, Torrence was active for five of the team's first ten games, recording 10 tackles and a half sack. He injured his shoulder in the Saints' November 22 win over Tampa Bay and was placed on the injured reserve list on November 23, making room for the Saints to re-sign veteran cornerback Mike McKenzie.

On March 9, 2010, Torrence signed a 1-year contract to return to the New Orleans Saints. He was waived on September 7 but re-signed on September 14. Torrence made several key plays in a nationally televised Sunday Night Football game against the Pittsburgh Steelers on October 31, 2010, first tackling Antwaan Randle El just short of the goal line to prevent a Steelers touchdown in the first half, then intercepting Ben Roethlisberger's pass late in the fourth quarter to seal the Saints' 20–10 win. It was the first interception of his NFL career.

On October 26, 2011, against the Indianapolis Colts, Torrence intercepted Curtis Painter's pass and returned it 42 yards for his first NFL touchdown.

Torrence has been noted for his support of the Sojourner Truth Academy, a New Orleans charter school high school founded by a Stanford classmate: Torrence raised $50,000 from his Saints teammates that was matched by an NFL grant and used to fund the school's football team.

=== Second Stint with Redskins ===
The Washington Redskins signed Torrence on April 10, 2012. The team released him on June 2, 2012.

=== Jacksonville Jaguars ===
Torrence was signed by the Jacksonville Jaguars on July 31, 2012, and later released on August 31.

== NFL career statistics ==
Legend
**Bold**	Career high

=== Regular season ===
Year	Team	Games		Tackles					Interceptions					Fumbles			
Year	Team	GP	GS	Cmb	Solo	Ast	Sck	TFL	Int	Yds	TD	Lng	PD	FF	FR	Yds	TD
2005	ATL	10	0	8	7	1	0.0	0	0	0	0	0	0	0	0	0	0
2007	WAS	**16**	**1**	**43**	**34**	**9**	**1.0**	1	0	0	0	0	0	0	0	0	0
2008	MIN	9	0	16	11	5	0.0	0	0	0	0	0	2	0	0	0	0
2008	NOR	7	0	9	7	2	0.0	0	0	0	0	0	2	0	0	0	0
2009	NOR	5	0	10	9	1	0.5	0	0	0	0	0	0	0	0	0	0
2010	NOR	13	0	28	27	1	**1.0**	**2**	**1**	21	0	21	2	0	0	0	0
2011	NOR	13	0	20	17	3	**1.0**	1	**1**	**42**	**1**	**42**	**3**	0	0	0	0
		73	1	134	112	22	3.5	4	2	63	1	42	9	0	0	0	0

=== Playoffs ===
Year	Team	Games		Tackles					Interceptions					Fumbles			
Year	Team	GP	GS	Cmb	Solo	Ast	Sck	TFL	Int	Yds	TD	Lng	PD	FF	FR	Yds	TD
2007	WAS	**1**	**1**	**3**	**3**	0	0.0	0	0	0	0	0	**1**	0	0	0	0
2010	NOR	**1**	0	1	1	0	0.0	0	0	0	0	0	0	0	0	0	0
		2	1	4	4	0	0.0	0	0	0	0	0	1	0	0	0	0

== Coaching career ==
=== New Orleans Saints ===
Torrence was a coaching intern for the Saints in 2016, and on March 5, 2017, it was reported that the Saints had promoted him to defensive assistant coach.

=== New York Jets ===
In February 2020, Torrence was named assistant defensive backs coach for the New York Jets.
