= Jason Campbell =

American football player (born 1981)

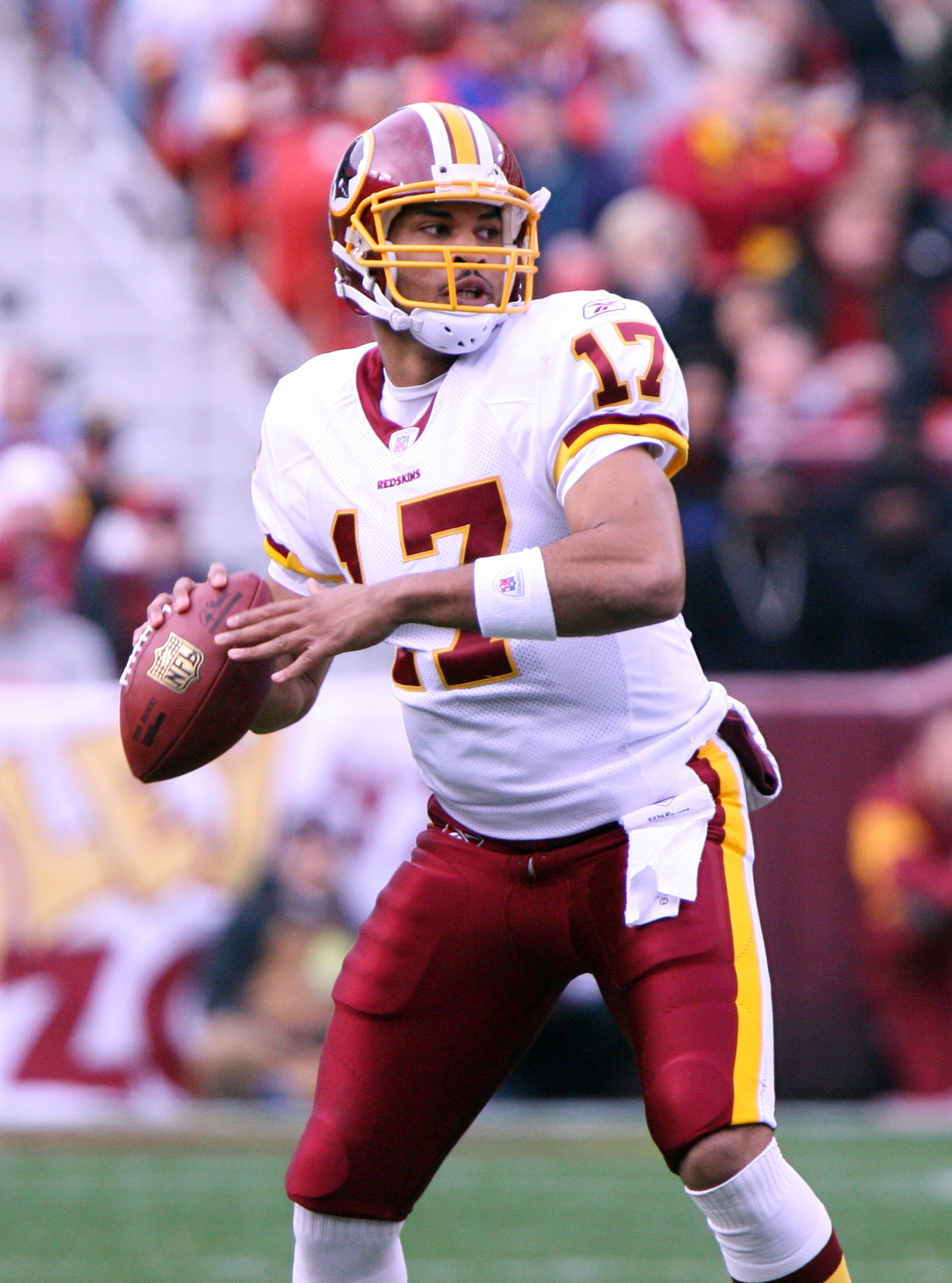
- Campbell with the Washington Redskins in 2006

No. 17, 8, 2
- Position: Quarterback

Personal information
- Born: December 31, 1981 (age 44); Laurel, Mississippi, U.S.
- Listed height: 6 ft 5 in (1.96 m)
- Listed weight: 235 lb (107 kg)

Career information
- High school: Taylorsville (MS)
- College: Auburn (2000–2004)
- NFL draft: 2005: 1st round, 25th overall pick

Career history
- Washington Redskins (2005–2009); Oakland Raiders (2010–2011); Chicago Bears (2012); Cleveland Browns (2013); Cincinnati Bengals (2014)

Awards and highlights
- SEC Offensive Player of the Year (2004)

Career NFL statistics
- Passing attempts: 2,518
- Passing completions: 1,519
- Completion percentage: 60.3%
- TD–INT: 87–60
- Passing yards: 16,771
- Passer rating: 81.7
- Stats at Pro Football Reference

Jason S. Campbell (born December 31, 1981) is an American former professional football player who was a quarterback in the National Football League (NFL). He played college football for the Auburn Tigers and was selected by the Washington Redskins in the first round of the 2005 NFL draft. Campbell also played for the Oakland Raiders, Chicago Bears, Cleveland Browns, and Cincinnati Bengals. After his playing career, he became an analyst for Auburn Sports Network.

== Early life ==
Jason S. Campbell was born on December 31, 1981, in Laurel, Mississippi. He was a 2000 graduate of Taylorsville High School in Taylorsville, Mississippi.

== College career ==
Campbell went on to play college football at Auburn. As a starter, he had a different offensive coordinator every year, finally finding success in his senior year when he led the Tigers to an undefeated season in 2004 and was named the SEC Player of the Year and MVP of the SEC Championship Game. Campbell previously held the record for the longest touchdown completion in Auburn football history, an 87-yard pass to Silas Daniels in a 2004 matchup versus Louisiana Tech, a record that is now held by Cam Newton, who completed a 94-yard pass to Emory Blake on October 2, 2010, in their victory over Louisiana-Monroe. Campbell graduated from Auburn with a degree in public administration.

== Professional career ==
Pre-draft measurables
Height	Weight	Arm length	Hand span	40-yard dash	Vertical jump	Wonderlic
6 ft 4 3/4 in (1.95 m)	230 lb (104 kg)	33 5/8 in (0.85 m)	9 5/8 in (0.24 m)	4.71 s	38.0 in (0.97 m)	23
All values from NFL Combine/Auburn Pro Day

=== Washington Redskins ===
Campbell was drafted in the first round as the 25th pick in the 2005 NFL draft by the Washington Redskins under General Manager Vinny Cerrato. The Redskins traded up in the draft to get Campbell, surrendering a third round pick in the 2005 NFL draft, along with first and fourth round picks in 2006. He was the third quarterback selected in that draft class, after Alex Smith (1st overall pick) and Aaron Rodgers (24th overall, the pick before Campbell).

Campbell didn't play in his rookie season, sitting on the bench behind Mark Brunell and Patrick Ramsey. On November 13, 2006, Campbell was named the Redskins starting quarterback, and on November 19, 2006, Campbell made his first career start. Despite losing in his first start to the Tampa Bay Buccaneers, Campbell was praised for his poise.

On November 26, 2006, Campbell had his first win of his professional career, leading the Redskins to a 17–13 victory over the Carolina Panthers. Campbell completed 11 passes on 23 attempts for only 118 yards, with two touchdowns and one interception. Campbell threw a 66-yard touchdown pass to tight end Chris Cooley in the fourth quarter.

On August 18, 2007, Campbell was tackled at the knee by Pittsburgh Steelers' defensive end Brett Keisel in the second preseason game. Initially, the injury looked severe but Campbell eventually walked off the field on his own. Trainers said that Campbell's ligaments were not torn and announced his injury as a bruised knee.

On December 6, 2007, Campbell dislocated the patellar ligament of his left knee during a game against the Chicago Bears. The injury did not require surgery but Campbell did not play for the remainder of the season.

When Joe Gibbs retired for a second time at the end of the 2007 season, the Redskins hired Jim Zorn, first as offensive coordinator and then naming him head coach. Zorn said at the time he would also serve as quarterbacks coach.

The Redskins started the season 6–2, prompting observers to declare Campbell one of the NFL's elite quarterbacks, and the "tough love" approach from head coach Jim Zorn a success. The team, however, then went on to lose six of their remaining eight games to end the season 8–8, missing the playoffs. At the end of the season, it was unclear if the Redskins were on the road to improvement or decline. Questions arose on the future of Campbell as the starting quarterback for the Washington Redskins.

Despite pursuing other quarterbacks in the offseason, the Redskins were unable to acquire Jay Cutler or Mark Sanchez, opting to start Campbell for the last year of his contract. Campbell and the Redskins ended 2009 with a 4–12 record, one of the worst in Redskins' history. The often rocky relationship Campbell had with head coach Jim Zorn ended with Zorn's firing. New Washington head coach Mike Shanahan said the Redskins would tender Campbell an offer leading up to the 2010 free agent period, ensuring that if he signed with another team, Washington would receive draft picks in compensation.

=== Oakland Raiders ===
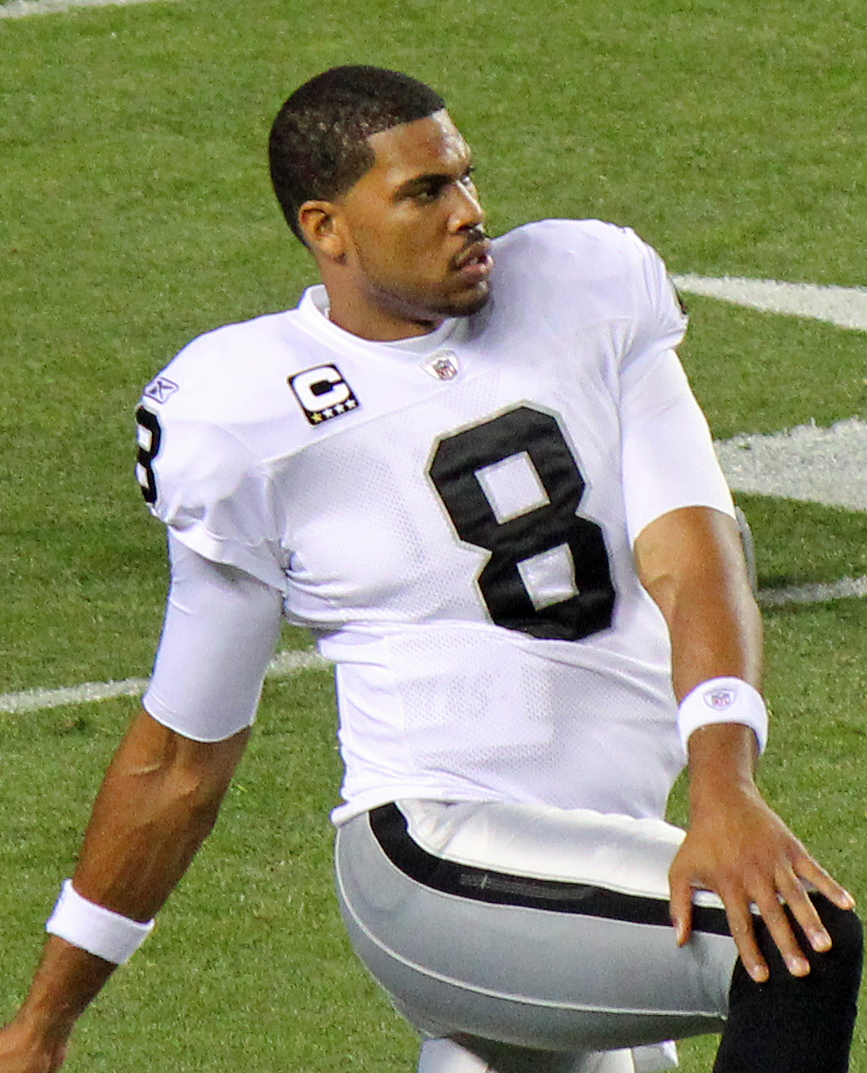
Campbell with the Oakland Raiders in 2011

After the Redskins acquired Donovan McNabb, Campbell was traded to the Oakland Raiders on April 24, 2010, for a fourth round pick in the 2012 NFL draft. On the same day, Campbell received a one-year contract extension through the 2011 season. Raiders owner Al Davis compared Campbell to former Raiders quarterback Jim Plunkett.

In the opening game on the road against the Tennessee Titans, Campbell had an unspectacular start to his Raiders career as the Raiders were routed 38–13. He would complete 22 of 37 passes for 180 yards and threw one touchdown and one interception. Campbell and rookie offensive linemen Jared Veldheer, playing in the unfamiliar role of center, would also suffer multiple miscues and combine for three fumbles, losing one. The offense as a whole would fail to click until the fourth quarter when Campbell completed 7 of 9 passes in a 12-play, 72-yard drive that culminated in a 7-yard touchdown pass to Darren McFadden. In week two against the St. Louis Rams Campbell would endure another lackluster performance, completing 8 of 15 passes for a mere 87 yards and an interception. At half-time he was benched in favor of his backup, Bruce Gradkowski, in the hope of providing the Raiders offense with the spark it desperately needed. Gradkowski would go on to lead the Raiders to a tight 16–14 victory.

Following Campbell's less than inspiring performances in the first two weeks, the Raiders' coaching staff decided to go with Bruce Gradkowski as the starting quarterback and demoted Campbell to the role of backup. The offense would show a marked improvement in the Week 3 and 4 match-ups against the Arizona Cardinals and Houston Texans respectively. Gradkowski would throw for 255 and 278 yards albeit in losing efforts. During the Week 5 home game against the San Diego Chargers, Campbell would come off the bench late in the first quarter to replace an injured Gradkowski. Behind a solid game by running back Michael Bush, Campbell was vastly improved as he completed 13 of 18 passes for 159 yards and a touchdown. Aided by a touchdown on a blocked punt in the first quarter and a forced fumble returned for a touchdown late in the fourth quarter, the Raiders would win the game 35–27 and snap a 13-game losing streak against the Chargers dating back to 2003.

After his improved play in the relief effort against the Chargers and with Gradkowski injured, Campbell was re-installed as the starter for the Week 6 match-up against the cross-Bay rival San Francisco 49ers. The Raiders were unable to find any spark on offense as Campbell once again struggled, completing just 8 of 21 passes for 83 yards and throwing two interceptions. The Raiders would go down 17–9 to then winless 49ers. Although coming off of his worst performance as a Raider, Campbell was assured the start against the division rival Denver Broncos in Week 7 due to Gradkowski's continuing struggles with the shoulder injury he sustained against the Chargers. Campbell and the Raiders started hot against the Broncos, jumping out to a 24–0 lead by the end of the first quarter and never let up in a 59–14 rout. The 59 points scored was a new franchise record. Campbell would complete 12 of 20 passes for 204 yards with two touchdowns and no interceptions for a QB rating of 127.9. Campbell would throw a 43-yard touchdown pass to tight end Zach Miller on the game's opening drive and a 19-yard touchdown pass to running back Darren McFadden.

Ironically, while Campbell was benched by coach's decision, the Raiders lost all three of the games that Campbell did not play in, as the Raiders finished the season at 8–8 and missed the playoffs. They were able to sweep all six division games, and Campbell ended the season with his second-highest quarterback rating of any season (84.5).

In 2011, Campbell started the first 6 games, leading Oakland to a 4–2 record before suffering a collarbone injury. To replace him, the Raiders traded draft picks to the Cincinnati Bengals for veteran quarterback Carson Palmer.

=== Chicago Bears ===
Campbell signed with the Chicago Bears on March 13, 2012, to a one-year contract as a backup to Jay Cutler. In Week 10 against the Houston Texans, Campbell replaced Cutler, who had gone down with a concussion. In the game, Campbell completed 11 of 19 passes for 94 yards and a 70.9 passer rating. On November 16, Cutler was ruled out of the Bears-San Francisco 49ers game, meaning Campbell would start the game. The Bears went on to lose 32–7; although Campbell had a 13-yard touchdown pass to Brandon Marshall in the third quarter, he also threw two interceptions and was sacked five times.

=== Cleveland Browns ===
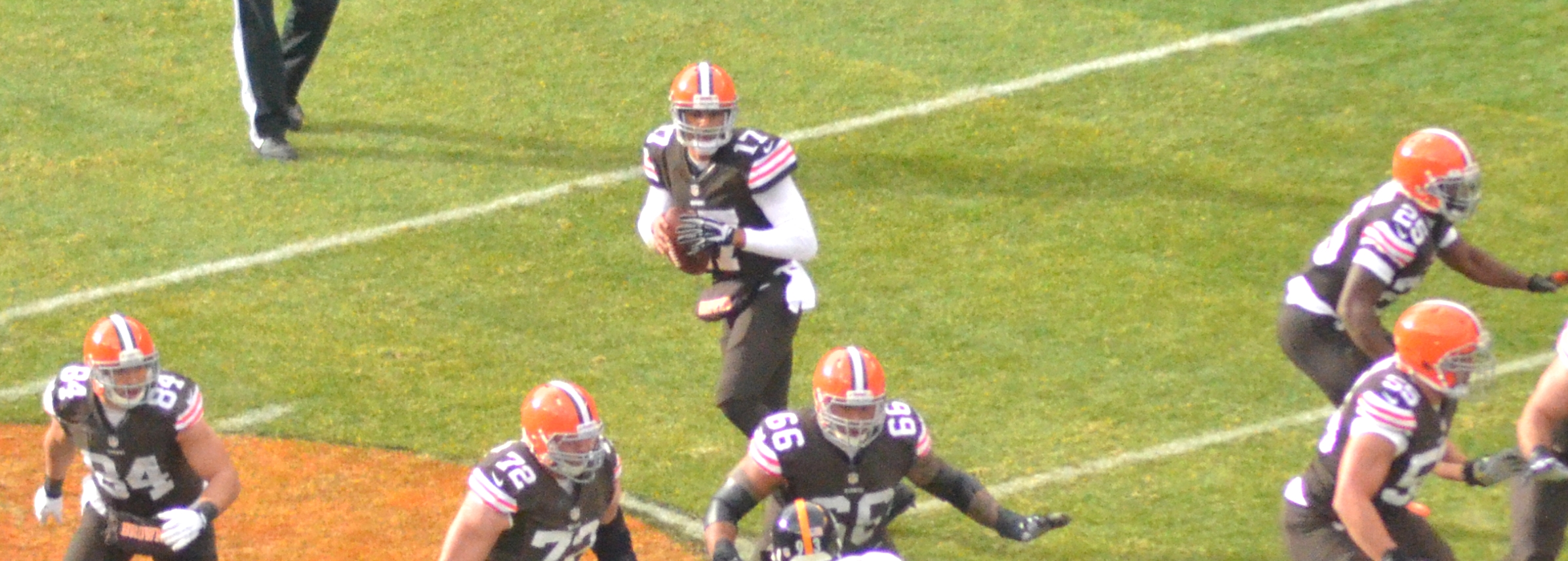
Campbell with the Cleveland Browns in 2013

On March 26, 2013, Campbell signed a two-year contract with the Cleveland Browns.

On September 18, 2013, it was announced that previous third-string quarterback Brian Hoyer would start ahead of Campbell for the team's next game on September 22, 2013, against the Minnesota Vikings, as starting quarterback Brandon Weeden sat with a thumb injury.

On October 23, it was announced Campbell would receive his first start as a Brown Week 8 vs the Kansas City Chiefs. The outing resulted in a 23–17 loss for the Browns, although Campbell's performance was viewed favorably, passing for 293 yards, 2 touchdowns and no interceptions. In week 9 Campbell snapped the Browns 11 game losing streak to the Ravens, throwing for 262 yards and 3 scores on his way to AFC offensive player of the week honors Campbell ended the 2013 season 1–7 as a starter for the Browns.

On March 12, 2014, Campbell was released by the Browns, along with fellow quarterback Weeden.

=== Cincinnati Bengals ===
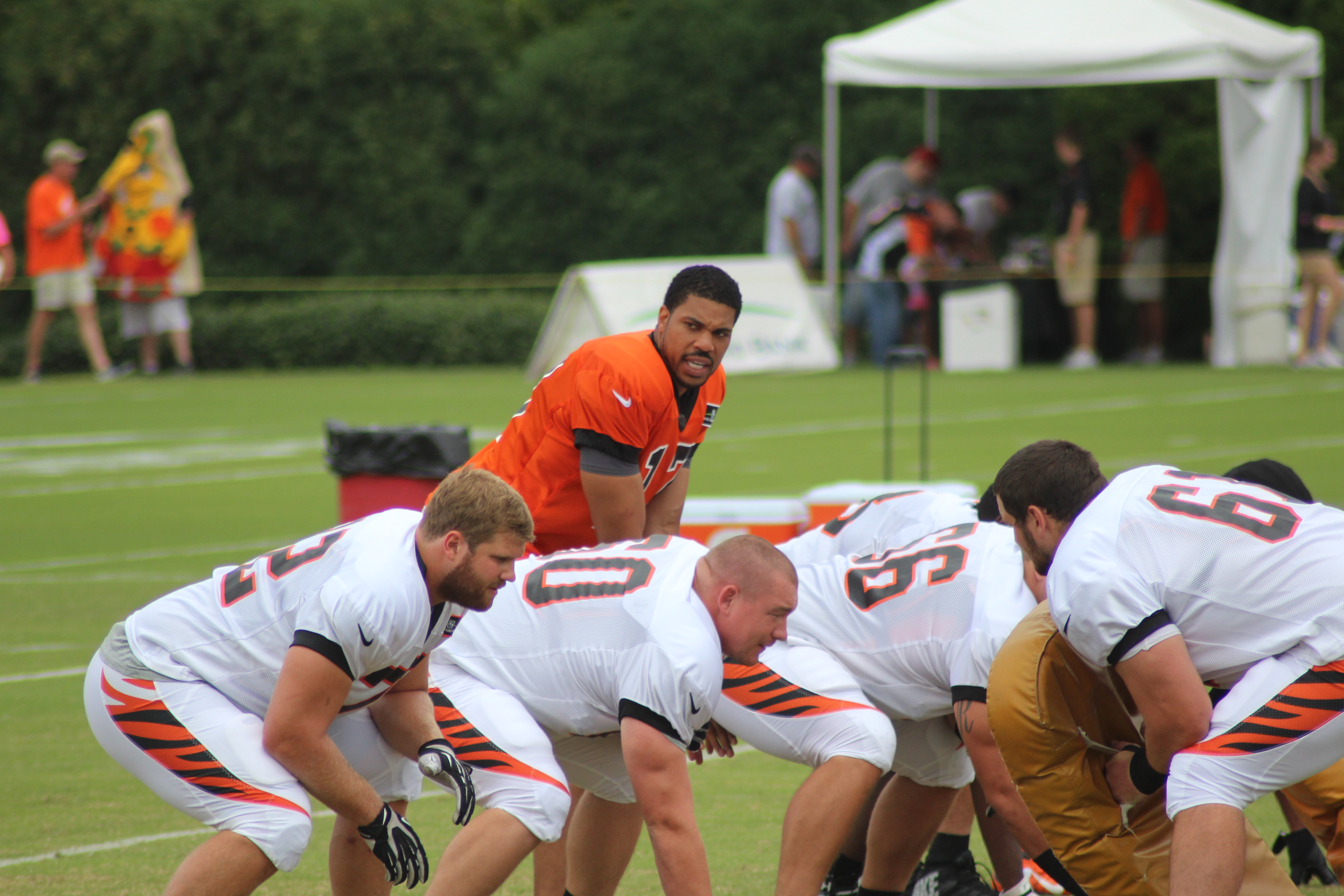
Campbell at Cincinnati Bengals training camp in 2014

On March 19, 2014, Campbell signed a one-year deal worth $1.5 million with $400,000 guaranteed with the Cincinnati Bengals. He served as backup to starter to Andy Dalton, only appearing in four games as a late game replacement for Dalton.

=== Retirement ===
In April 2015, Campbell strongly hinted at retirement, declining offers from several teams. He was approached by the Indianapolis Colts in November 2015, but declined to come out of retirement to be a backup to Matt Hasselbeck, who was starting in place of an injured Andrew Luck.

== Career statistics ==
=== NFL ===
Year	Team	Games			Passing									Rushing				Sacks		Fumbles (Note: Fumbles lost data taken from Pro Football Reference career game log)	
Year	Team	GP	GS	Record	Cmp	Att	Pct	Yds	Y/A	TD	Int	Lng	Rtg	Att	Yds	Avg	TD	Sck	SckY	Fum	Lost
2005	WAS	0	0	–	DNP																
2006	WAS	7	7	2–5	110	207	53.1	1,297	6.3	10	6	66	76.5	24	107	4.5	0	7	55	1	0
2007	WAS	13	13	6–7	250	417	60.0	2,700	6.5	12	11	54	77.6	36	185	5.1	1	21	110	13	8
2008	WAS	16	16	8–8	315	506	62.3	3,245	6.4	13	6	67	84.3	47	258	5.5	1	38	266	7	1
2009	WAS	16	16	4–12	327	507	64.5	3,618	7.1	20	15	84	86.4	46	236	5.1	1	43	285	13	3
2010	OAK	13	12	7–5	194	329	59.0	2,387	7.3	13	8	73	84.5	47	222	4.7	1	33	208	9	1
2011	OAK	6	6	4–2	100	165	60.6	1,170	7.1	6	4	58	84.2	18	60	3.3	2	5	19	3	1
2012	CHI	6	1	0–1	32	51	62.7	265	5.2	2	2	45	72.8	7	28	4.0	0	6	49	2	0
2013	CLE	9	8	1–7	180	317	56.8	2,015	6.4	11	8	80	76.9	14	107	7.6	0	16	104	3	2
2014	CIN	4	0	–	11	19	57.9	74	3.9	0	0	38	66.6	1	1	1.0	0	1	0	1	1
Career		90	79	32–47	1,519	2,518	60.3	16,771	6.7	87	60	84	81.7	240	1,204	5.0	6	170	1,096	52	17

=== College ===
Season	Team	GP	Passing								Rushing			
Season	Team	GP	Cmp	Att	Pct	Yds	Avg	TD	Int	Rtg	Att	Yds	Avg	TD
2001	Auburn	9	89	142	62.7	1,117	7.9	4	4	132.4	46	72	1.6	2
2002	Auburn	13	94	149	63.1	1,215	8.2	11	5	149.2	72	206	2.9	3
2003	Auburn	13	181	293	61.8	2,267	7.7	10	8	132.6	73	-1	0.0	1
2004	Auburn	13	188	270	69.6	2,700	10.0	20	7	172.9	58	30	0.5	3
Career		48	552	854	64.6	7,299	8.5	45	24	148.2	249	307	1.2	9

== Awards and honors ==
NFL

- NFC Offensive Player of the Week (Week 5, 2007)
- AFC Offensive Player of the Week (Week 9, 2013)

College

- SEC Offensive Player of the Year (2004)
- First-team All-SEC (2004)
- Sugar Bowl MVP (2005)
- Music City Bowl MVP (2003)
- Senior Bowl Hall of Fame (2026)

== Personal life ==
Campbell is the cousin of retired basketball player LaSondra Barrett. Campbell is a Christian.

Campbell made several appearances in TV commercials for Eastern Automotive Group, a local car dealership group in the DC and Baltimore areas, alongside teammates Clinton Portis, Antwaan Randle El and Chris Cooley.
