= Ethan Albright =

American football player (born 1971)

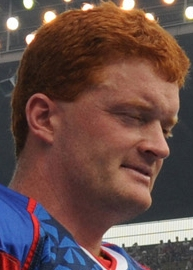
- Albright at the 2008 Pro Bowl

No. 71, 76, 77, 67, 64
- Position: Long snapper

Personal information
- Born: May 1, 1971 (age 55); Greensboro, North Carolina, U.S.
- Listed height: 6 ft 5 in (1.96 m)
- Listed weight: 248 lb (112 kg)

Career information
- High school: Grimsley (Greensboro)
- College: North Carolina (1990–1993)
- NFL draft: 1994: undrafted

Career history
- Miami Dolphins (1994)*; Green Bay Packers (1994)*; Miami Dolphins (1995); Buffalo Bills (1996–2000); Washington Redskins (2001–2009); San Diego Chargers (2010)
- * Offseason or practice squad member only

Awards and highlights
- Pro Bowl (2007); First-team All-ACC (1993)

Career NFL statistics
- Games played: 236
- Total tackles: 24
- Fumble recoveries: 2
- Stats at Pro Football Reference

Lawrence Ethan Albright (born May 1, 1971) is an American former professional football long snapper who played in the National Football League (NFL) for 16 seasons. Nicknamed "the Red Snapper", he spent the majority of his career with the Washington Redskins.

Albright began his career in 1995 with the Miami Dolphins and was a member of the Buffalo Bills during next five seasons. He joined the Redskins in 2001, playing nine seasons and receiving Pro Bowl honors in 2007. Albright spent his final season with the San Diego Chargers.

== Early life ==
Albright attended Grimsley High School in Greensboro, North Carolina, graduating in 1989, and was a standout in football, basketball, and baseball. As a senior, he was named the 1988–89 NCHSAA Male Athlete of the Year.

== College career ==
Albright played tight end early in his career for the North Carolina Tar Heels but later switched to offensive tackle and was named first-team All-ACC at that position in 1993. Albright also handled the long snapping duties for the Tar Heels.

== Professional career ==
=== Miami Dolphins ===
Albright began as an undrafted free agent, but later signed with the Miami Dolphins, playing 10 games during the 1995 season.

=== Buffalo Bills ===
Albright signed for the Buffalo Bills in 1996. He played 16 games in every season between 1996 and 2000.

=== Washington Redskins ===
In 2001, he signed with the Redskins. On March 3, 2005, he was re-signed by the team.

Albright was named to the Pro Bowl following the 2007 season. He wore the number 21, along with teammates Chris Cooley and Chris Samuels, in honor of their teammate Sean Taylor, who was killed during the 2007 season. Albright was re-signed by the Redskins, keeping him away from the free agent market, on February 19, 2008.

On February 13, 2009, Albright re-signed with the Washington Redskins.

On September 28, 2010, Albright signed with the San Diego Chargers. He was released two weeks later on October 13.

Following his retirement from the league, Albright set the record for the most consecutive starts by a long snapper at 230 and the most consecutive regular season starts at 224, the latter of which has been tied by John Denney.

== In popular culture ==
In 2006, Albright became an internet meme for being the lowest-rated NFL player in the video game Madden NFL 07 at 53 out of 99. The low rating was made popular by the now-defunct website Phat Phree and gained further traction after Albright received Pro Bowl honors the following year.

== Personal life ==
Albright and his wife, Katherine, have two daughters and two sons: Mary Grace, Madelyn Costner, Lawson Geoffrey and Nolan Davis; they reside in his hometown of Greensboro, North Carolina. He retired as the athletic director at Grimsley High School, his alma mater.

== See also ==
- List of most consecutive games played
