= Jason Fabini =

American football player (born 1974)

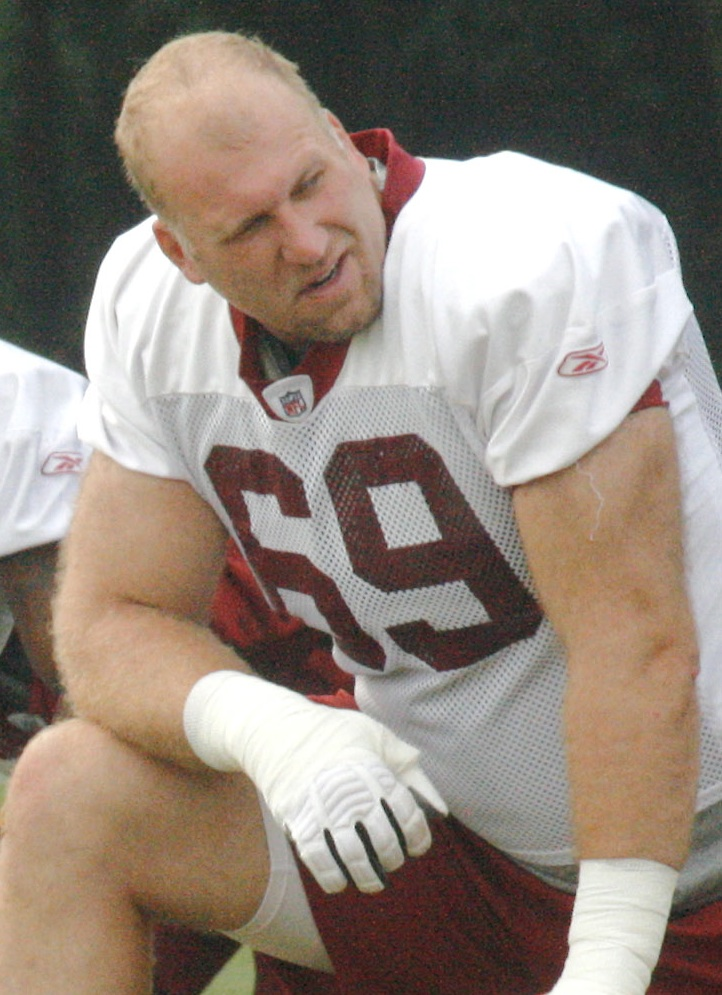
- Fabini with the Washington Redskins in 2008

No. 69
- Position: Offensive tackle

Personal information
- Born: August 25, 1974 (age 52); Fort Wayne, Indiana, U.S.
- Listed height: 6 ft 7 in (2.01 m)
- Listed weight: 309 lb (140 kg)

Career information
- High school: Bishop Dwenger (Fort Wayne)
- College: Cincinnati
- NFL draft: 1998: 4th round, 111th overall pick

Career history
- New York Jets (1998–2005); Dallas Cowboys (2006); Washington Redskins (2007–2008)

Awards and highlights
- PFWA All-Rookie Team (1998); New York Jets All-Time Four Decade Team; 3× All-C-USA (1995, 1996, 1997)

Career NFL statistics
- Games played: 152
- Games started: 129
- Fumble recoveries: 1
- Stats at Pro Football Reference

Jason Tamer Fabini (born August 25, 1974) is an American former professional football player who was an offensive tackle in the National Football League (NFL) for the New York Jets, Dallas Cowboys and Washington Redskins. He played college football for the Cincinnati Bearcats and was selected by the Jets in the fourth round of the 1998 NFL draft.

== Early life ==
Fabini attended Bishop Dwenger High School in Fort Wayne, Indiana. He was a starter at offensive guard and defensive tackle.

== College career ==
Fabini accepted a football scholarship from the University of Cincinnati, where he was a four-year starter at left tackle and an All-Conference USA selection. In his junior season, he contributed to the school's first bowl-game invitation in 47 years. He played in 44 career games and made 43 starts.

In 2009, he was inducted into the University of Cincinnati Athletics Hall of Fame.

== Professional career ==
Pre-draft measurables
| Height | Weight | Arm length | Hand span | 40-yard dash | 10-yard split | 20-yard split | 20-yard shuttle | Vertical jump | Broad jump | Bench press |
|---|---|---|---|---|---|---|---|---|---|---|
| 6 ft 6 3/8 in (1.99 m) | 314 lb (142 kg) | 34 1/4 in (0.87 m) | 11 in (0.28 m) | 5.63 s | 1.96 s | 3.26 s | 4.68 s | 25.5 in (0.65 m) | 7 ft 5 in (2.26 m) | 20 reps |

=== New York Jets ===
Fabini was selected by the New York Jets in the fourth round (111th overall) of the 1998 NFL draft. He became a starter at right tackle as a rookie under head coach Bill Parcells.

In 1999, he started 9 games (8 at right tackle and one at left tackle) and was lost for the season after suffering a torn anterior cruciate ligament, in the ninth game against the New England Patriots. In 2000, he became the starter at left tackle and helped the offensive line tie a league low 20 sacks allowed on the season. He remained in that role and didn't miss a game for the next 4 seasons.

In 2005, he was moved to right tackle after struggling on the left side. He started 9 games before he was placed on the injured reserve list with a torn chest muscle. On February 22, he was released for salary cap reasons.

=== Dallas Cowboys ===
On March 18, 2006, he was signed as a free agent by the Dallas Cowboys, reuniting him with his former Jets head coach Bill Parcells. Although he had the inside track for the starting right tackle job, he was passed on the depth chart by Marc Colombo and relegated to special teams duties. He was released on March 10, 2007.

=== Washington Redskins ===
On March 26, 2007, Fabini signed a one-year deal with the Washington Redskins. He replaced an injured Randy Thomas at right guard in the second week and went on to start in 13 games.

He signed a second contract with the Redskins exactly one year later on March 26, 2008. He appeared in 7 games with 2 starts. He was not re-signed after the season.

== Personal life ==
Fabini was in the movie Made, which starred Vince Vaughn and Jon Favreau. He played the role of Doorman #3. In 2017, he was hired as an assistant football coach at Bishop Dwenger High School.
