= Derrick Frost =

American football player (born 1980)

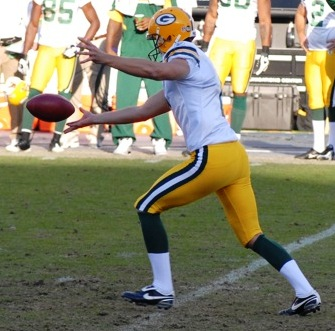
- Frost with the Green Bay Packers in 2008

Missouri Baptist Spartans
- Title: Assistant special teams coach

Personal information
- Born: November 25, 1980 (age 45); St. Louis, Missouri, U.S.
- Listed height: 6 ft 3 in (1.91 m)
- Listed weight: 210 lb (95 kg)

Career information
- Position: Punter (No. 8, 4, 6)
- High school: Clayton (Clayton, Missouri)
- College: Northern Iowa
- NFL draft: 2003: undrafted

Career history

Playing
- Philadelphia Eagles (2003)*; Baltimore Ravens (2003)*; Cleveland Browns (2003–2004); Washington Redskins (2005–2007); Green Bay Packers (2008); California Redwoods (2009)
- * Offseason or practice squad member only

Coaching
- Missouri Baptist (2026–present) Assistant special teams coach

Career NFL statistics
- Punts: 365
- Punt yards: 15,042
- Punting average: 41.2
- Stats at Pro Football Reference

Derrick E. Frost (born November 25, 1980) is an American college football coach and former professional player who was a punter in the National Football League (NFL). He is an assistant special teams coach for Missouri Baptist University, a position he has held since 2026. He was signed by the Philadelphia Eagles as an undrafted free agent in 2003. He played college football for the Northern Iowa Panthers.

Frost was also a member of the Baltimore Ravens, Cleveland Browns, Washington Redskins, Green Bay Packers, and California Redwoods.

== Early life ==
Frost attended Clayton High School in Clayton, Missouri, and as a student was a letterman in football and baseball. In football, he was an All-Conference selection as a quarterback, linebacker, punter, and kicker.

== College career ==
Frost attended the University of Northern Iowa and was a good student and a letterman in football and baseball. In football, during his college career, Frost punted 104 times for 4388 yards (42.19 yards per punt avg.).

== Professional career ==
=== Philadelphia Eagles ===
On May 2, 2003, he was signed by the Philadelphia Eagles as an undrafted rookie free agent. He was waived on May 13, 2003.

=== Baltimore Ravens ===
Frost signed with the Baltimore Ravens on May 27, 2003. He was waived by the Ravens on August 30, 2003.

=== Cleveland Browns ===
Frost was signed to the practice squad of the Cleveland Browns on December 9, 2003. He was promoted to the active roster on December 12, 2003. He played in all 16 games for the Browns during the 2004 season. Frost re-signed with the Browns on March 28, 2005. He was waived on August 29, 2005.

=== Washington Redskins ===
Frost signed with the Washington Redskins on September 26, 2005. In the 2006 season he had success with nine 40+ punts. Also he had a couple of 50 plus punts for the Redskins of late after Week 12 in the league.

During the 2007 preseason game against the Tennessee Titans, Frost raced out after a punt to level the Titan's punt returner causing a forced fumble.

In 2008, he battled rookie Durant Brooks for the punting job. He was cut on August 30 during final cuts;

=== Green Bay Packers ===
Two days after being released by the Redskins, Frost was signed by the Green Bay Packers, who previously cut Jon Ryan. Frost was released by the Packers on December 1, 2008. Head coach Mike McCarthy stated that Frost performed well in practices, but did not do well during the games.

=== California Redwoods ===
Frost was signed by the California Redwoods of the United Football League on September 2, 2009. He was released on October 25, 2009.

== NFL career statistics ==
Legend
**Bold**	Career high

=== Regular season ===
Year	Team	Punting									
Year	Team	GP	Punts	Yds	Net Yds	Lng	Avg	Net Avg	Blk	Ins20	TB
2004	CLE	**16**	**85**	3,404	3,011	54	40.0	35.4	0	24	4
2005	WAS	14	76	3,074	2,791	55	40.4	**36.7**	0	23	6
2006	WAS	**16**	81	**3,471**	**3,012**	60	**42.9**	**36.7**	**1**	**27**	**7**
2007	WAS	**16**	75	3,072	2,730	64	41.0	36.4	0	23	**7**
2008	GNB	12	48	2,021	1,732	**65**	42.1	36.1	0	8	5
Career		74	365	15,042	13,276	65	41.2	36.3	1	105	29

=== Playoffs ===
Year	Team	Punting									
Year	Team	GP	Punts	Yds	Net Yds	Lng	Avg	Net Avg	Blk	Ins20	TB
2005	WAS	**2**	**14**	**567**	**511**	51	40.5	**36.5**	0	**3**	0
2007	WAS	1	8	348	264	**53**	**43.5**	33.0	0	2	0
Career		3	22	915	775	53	41.6	35.2	0	5	0

== Post-football ==
Frost is president of Profusion Financial and is a member of the board of directors of the NFLPA.
