= Mike Espy (American football) =

American football player (born 1982)

No. 11
- Position: Wide receiver

Personal information
- Born: November 29, 1982 (age 43); Jackson, Mississippi, U.S.
- Listed height: 5 ft 11 in (1.80 m)
- Listed weight: 195 lb (88 kg)

Career information
- High school: Madison Central (Madison, Mississippi)
- College: Ole Miss
- NFL draft: 2006: undrafted

Career history
- Washington Redskins (2006–2007)

Career NFL statistics
- Games played: 1
- Stats at Pro Football Reference

Michael William Alexander Espy (born November 29, 1982) is an American former professional football player who was a wide receiver in the National Football League (NFL). He was originally signed by the Washington Redskins as an undrafted free agent in 2006. He played college football for the Ole Miss Rebels.

Espy's namesake father is a well-known politician and was the United States Secretary of Agriculture under the Clinton Administration.
