= Byron Westbrook =

American football player and coach (born 1984)

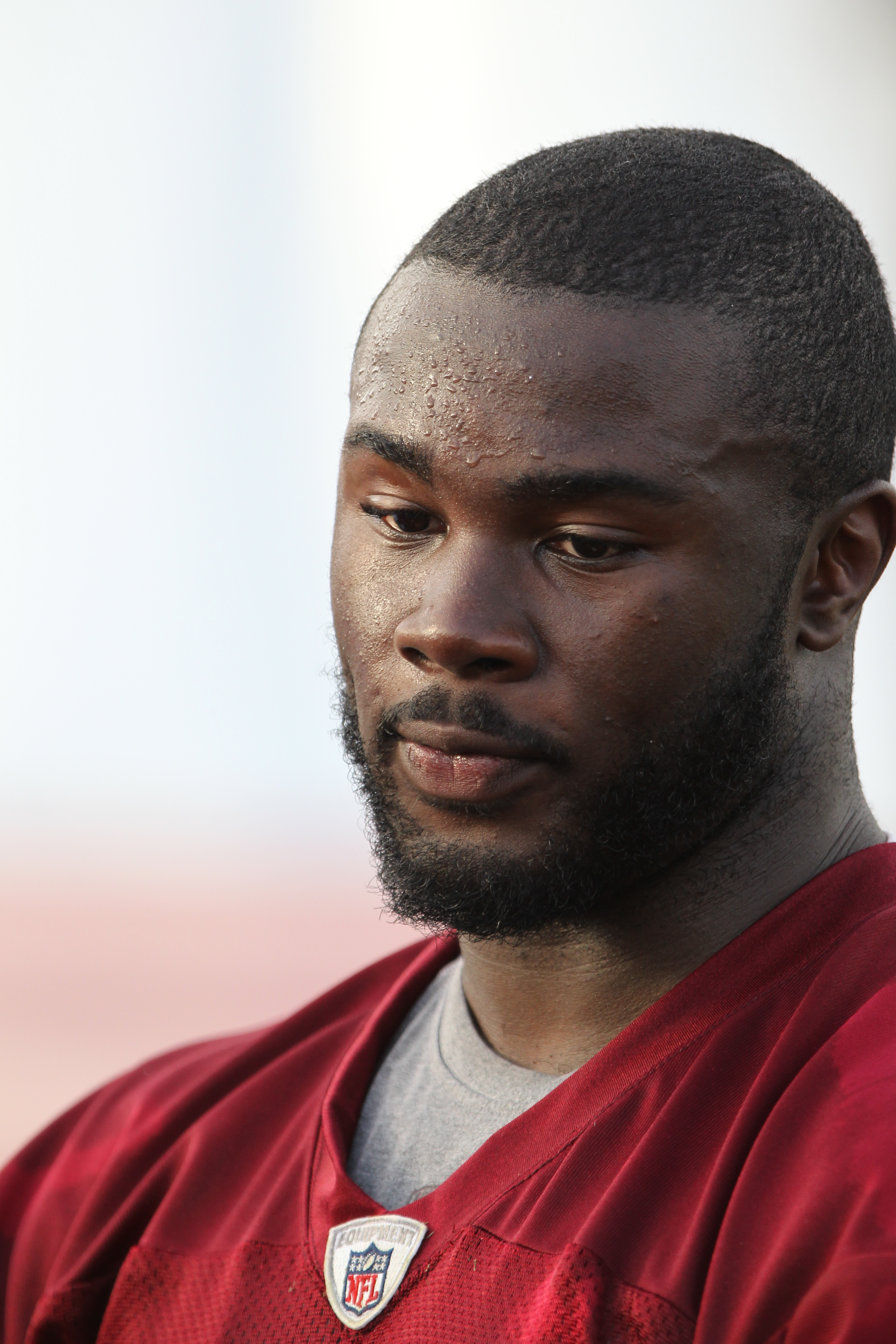
- Westbrook at Redskins training camp in 2011

No. 34
- Position: Cornerback

Personal information
- Born: December 26, 1984 (age 41); Washington, D.C., U.S.
- Listed height: 5 ft 10 in (1.78 m)
- Listed weight: 201 lb (91 kg)

Career information
- High school: DeMatha Catholic (Hyattsville, Maryland)
- College: Salisbury
- NFL draft: 2007: undrafted

Career history

Playing
- Washington Redskins (2007–2011)

Coaching
- Bladensburg HS (2017–present)

Awards and highlights
- 3× All-ACFC (2004–2006)

Career NFL statistics
- Total tackles: 46
- Forced fumbles: 1
- Fumble recoveries: 1
- Pass deflections: 4
- Stats at Pro Football Reference

Byron Craig Westbrook (born December 26, 1984) is an American football coach and former cornerback. He was signed by the Washington Redskins as an undrafted free agent in 2007 and played for the team until 2011. He played college football at Salisbury University. Since 2017, he has been head football coach at Bladensburg High School in Bladensburg, Maryland.

== Early life ==
Born in Washington, D.C., and raised in Fort Washington, Maryland, Westbrook attended and played high school football at DeMatha Catholic High School in Hyattsville, Maryland.

== College career ==
Westbrook set a record for career interceptions at Salisbury University with 18. He was a 2006 American Football Coaches Association All-American. In addition, he was a three-time All-Atlantic Central Football Conference first-team selection at defensive back and was a two-time first-team selection on special teams. He is also the only Salisbury University graduate to play in the NFL. Westbrook graduated from Salisbury in December 2006 with a B.S. in information systems.

== Professional career ==
=== Washington Redskins ===
Westbrook was signed by the Washington Redskins as an undrafted free agent on May 15, 2007. On September 1, he was released after not making final roster cuts, but was signed to the team's practice squad the next day.

On August 30, 2008, he was released after not making the team's final roster again. He was re-signed to the team's practice squad the next day.

On February 11, 2009, the Redskins re-signed Westbrook.

The Redskins decided not to tender restricted free agent contract to Westbrook by March 13 deadline, which allowed him to become an unrestricted free agent for the 2012 season.

== Post-football career ==
In January 2017, Westbrook was hired as the head football coach at Bladensburg High School in Bladensburg, Maryland.

== Personal ==
He is the younger brother of Brian Westbrook, a two-time Pro Bowl running back. His cousin, Lawrence Westbrook, is currently a point guard for the Neckar Riesen Ludwigsburg of the German Basketball Bundesliga league.

Westbrook was inducted into the Salisbury University Athletics Hall of Fame in 2017.
