= Antwaan Randle El =

American football player and coach (born 1979)

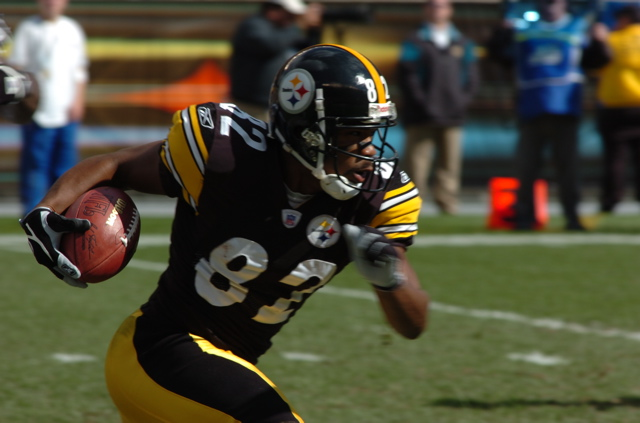
- Randle El with the Pittsburgh Steelers in 2005

Chicago Bears
- Title: Assistant head coach and wide receivers coach

Personal information
- Born: August 17, 1979 (age 47); Riverdale, Illinois, U.S.
- Listed height: 5 ft 10 in (1.78 m)
- Listed weight: 185 lb (84 kg)

Career information
- Position: Wide receiver (No. 82)
- High school: Thornton Township (Harvey, Illinois)
- College: Indiana (1998–2001)
- NFL draft: 2002: 2nd round, 62nd overall pick

Career history

Playing
- Pittsburgh Steelers (2002–2005); Washington Redskins (2006–2009); Pittsburgh Steelers (2010)

Coaching
- Tampa Bay Buccaneers (2019–2020) Offensive assistant; Detroit Lions (2021–2024) Wide receivers coach; Chicago Bears (2025–present) Assistant head coach and wide receivers coach

Awards and highlights
- As a player: Super Bowl champion (XL); First-team All-Pro (2005); PFWA All-Rookie Team (2002); First-team All-American (2001); Big Ten Most Valuable Player (2001); Big Ten Offensive Player of the Year (2001); Big Ten Freshman of the Year (1998); First-team All-Big Ten (2001); 2× Second-team All-Big Ten (1999, 2000); As a coach: Super Bowl champion (LV)

Career NFL statistics
- Receptions: 370
- Receiving yards: 4,467
- Receiving touchdowns: 15
- Return yards: 4,316
- Return touchdowns: 6
- Passing yards: 323
- TD–INT: 6-0
- Stats at Pro Football Reference

Antwaan Randle El (/ˈæntwɑːn ˌrændəlˈɛl/ AN-twahn RAN-dəl-EL; born August 17, 1979) is an American professional football coach and former player who currently serves as the wide receivers coach and assistant head coach for the Chicago Bears of the National Football League (NFL). He played college football as a quarterback for the Indiana Hoosiers, earning first-team All-American honors in 2001. He also played basketball and baseball for the Hoosiers. He was selected by the Pittsburgh Steelers in the second round of the 2002 NFL draft. Playing with the Steelers for four seasons as a wide receiver and return specialist, he was active in all 64 regular season games with 23 starts. He was also instrumental in a number of trick plays, including throwing a touchdown pass as a wide receiver for the Steelers in Super Bowl XL.

After the 2005 NFL season, Randle El was signed as a free agent with the Washington Redskins, where he scored ten touchdowns, catching eight and throwing two. In 2007, Randle El was sidelined for a game against the Buffalo Bills with a hamstring injury. This was the only inactive game of his NFL career.

Randle El was released by the Redskins in March 2010, re-signing with the Steelers shortly after. Randle El was also named fifth in USA Today's All-Decade kick returners.

For a time, he was also a sideline reporter for the Big Ten Network for interconference games that the Indiana football team plays.

== Early life ==
Randle El was born in Riverdale, Illinois as the son of Curtis Randle El Sr., a food distributor, and Jacqueline, a day-care provider. Randle El was raised a Pentecostal Christian. A Chicago Bears fan, he attended Thornton Township High School in Harvey, Illinois, where he played football, basketball, and baseball. He was a high school teammate of former NFL linebacker Napoleon Harris, as well as NBA center Melvin Ely and former NFL wide receiver Tai Streets.

After graduating from Thornton Township in 1997, Randle El was drafted in the 1997 Major League Baseball draft, selected in the 14th round (424th overall) by the Chicago Cubs. He opted instead to pursue a football scholarship at Indiana University, despite being told he was too small during the recruiting process.

== College career ==
Randle El attended Indiana University Bloomington from 1997 to 2001, playing college football primarily as a quarterback. Due to a low SAT score, he sat out his first full technical year at Indiana as a partial academic qualifier. Playing for the first time in Indiana's 1998 season opener against the Western Michigan Broncos, Randle El completed 22-of-29 passing attempts for 385 yards, three touchdowns, and no interceptions, as well as rushing for 82 yards on 23 carries for three touchdowns. The Hoosiers would go on to win the game, 45–30, with Randle El's 467 yards breaking the NCAA freshman total offense record in his first collegiate game. His performance was also the third all-time highest passing yards in a single game for Indiana, and would earn Randle El the co-Big Ten Player of the Week award. In the same season, Randle El would lead the team to victory over the Iowa Hawkeyes on October 17, 1998, with a rushing touchdown in the final seconds of the game. The win came after a 62–0 loss to Iowa the previous season, making Indiana the first team in the history of the Big Ten Conference to lose to a team by more than 60 points in one season, and beat them the following year. Randle El would win the Big Ten Player of the Week award for a second time for his performance. On December 1, 1998, Randle El was announced as the winner of the 1998 Big Ten Freshman of the Year award, voted for by both conference coaches and the media. The award was later re-titled the "Thompson-Randle El Freshman of the Year" award, partly in honor of Randle El's successful college career. Over the course of the 1998 season, Randle El tallied four 100-yard rushing games, against the Minnesota Golden Gophers, the Michigan Wolverines, the Michigan State Spartans, and the Cincinnati Bearcats. He finished the season and his freshman year with 1,745 passing yards and six touchdowns, as well as 873 yards rushing as a quarterback, breaking the Indiana University season record.

While at Indiana, Randle El became the first player in NCAA Division I history to pass for 40 career touchdowns and score 40 career rushing touchdowns. In 2001, he was awarded the Chicago Tribune Silver Football, presented by the Chicago Tribune to the Most Valuable Player of the Big Ten Conference. He finished his collegiate career as fifth on the all-time NCAA total yardage list, and became the first player in college football history to record 2,500 total yards for each of four consecutive years. Tallying 7,469 passing yards, 3,895 rushing yards, and 92 touchdowns running and passing for his college career, he finish sixth in the Heisman Trophy voting in his senior season. Randle El ended his college career with a 26–15 win over the Kentucky Wildcats, passing for two touchdowns.

In 2000, Penn State head coach Joe Paterno said of Randle El, "He is just the whole offense. It is scary to watch him. He is so quick that if you don't get on him and you wait for him to pitch the ball, he will take off on you. He is just an amazing athlete. I don't know how you get ready for him."

While attending Indiana, Randle El also played varsity basketball under Hall of Fame head coach Bob Knight. Following the regular-season football finale against Purdue on November 21, 1998, Randle El joined the 1998–99 Indiana basketball team in Hawaii for the 1998 Maui Invitational on November 23 but did not see any action in the three games. In his first basketball practice with the team, he broke the first metacarpal bone in his right hand while deflecting a pass, causing him to miss the next four weeks. He made his Hoosiers basketball debut on December 20 against San Francisco, wearing a soft cast on his right hand, his shooting hand. In his debut, he had five points, two rebounds and two assists in five minutes during the 106–54 victory. After appearing in nine games, Randle El broke another bone in the same hand, causing him to miss the remainder of the regular season. He returned for the NCAA tournament, playing in the first and second rounds against George Washington and St. John's. In the 1998–99 season, Randle El played in 11 games for the basketball team, averaging 1.5 points and 0.7 rebounds in 6.7 minutes per game. Randle El did not play basketball during the 1999–2000 season, choosing to rest after playing football and basketball during the previous academic year. He never returned to the Indiana basketball team afterward. In 2000, Randle El joined the Indiana varsity baseball team, playing under head coach Bob Morgan. He appeared in 13 of the team's 56 games as Indiana finished 29–27, recording one hit in 12 at bats.

In November 2012, Randle El was inducted into the Indiana Athletic Hall of Fame. In June 2025, he was named one of the 79 nominees for the 2026 class of the College Football Hall of Fame.

== Professional career ==
Pre-draft measurables
Height	Weight	Arm length	Hand span	40-yard dash	10-yard split	20-yard split
5 ft 9 5/8 in (1.77 m)	191 lb (87 kg)	30 1/2 in (0.77 m)	9 1/2 in (0.24 m)	4.55 s	1.59 s	2.65 s
All values from NFL Combine

=== Pittsburgh Steelers (first stint) ===
Randle El was selected as a wide receiver in the second round of the 2002 NFL draft with the 62nd overall pick by the Pittsburgh Steelers. He was the ninth wide receiver to be selected in the 2002 NFL Draft. He earned AFC Special Teams Player of the Week for his game against Baltimore in Week 8. As a rookie, he had 47 receptions for 489 receiving yards and two receiving touchdowns. He was named to the NFL All-Rookie Team.

In Week 8 of the 2003 season, Randle El earned AFC Special Teams Player of the Week for his game against St. Louis. He had an 84-yard punt return for a touchdown in the game. In the 2003 season, Randle El finished with 37 receptions for 364 receiving yards and one receiving touchdown.

The Steelers made him their top kickoff returner through the 2004 season, and their top punt returner. In Week 15, against the New York Giants, he threw his first professional touchdown pass on a 10-yard catch by Verron Haynes. He finished the 2004 season with 43 receptions for 601 receiving yards and three receiving touchdowns.

In Week 10 of the 2005 season, against the Cleveland Browns, Randle El threw a 51-yard touchdown pass to Hines Ward. In the 2005 season, he finished with 35 receptions for 558 receiving yards and one receiving touchdown. He had a game-clinching 43-yard reverse touchdown pass to Hines Ward in the fourth quarter of Super Bowl XL, his only championship title. He was the third non-quarterback and the first wide receiver in NFL history to throw a touchdown pass in the Super Bowl.

=== Washington Redskins ===
During the free agency period in March 2006, Randle El signed a seven-year deal with the Washington Redskins, worth $31 million with $11.5 million in bonuses. He had initially been in talks to sign a six-year, $18 million contract with the Chicago Bears, but discussions had broken down following the first day of free agency. In the Redskins' Week 7 game against the Indianapolis Colts, he returned a punt 87 yards for a touchdown in the second quarter, his first punt return for a touchdown with the Redskins, then in Week 17, he passed for his first touchdown as a Redskin, completing a 48-yard pass to wide receiver Santana Moss. In the 2006 season, he finished with 32 receptions for 351 receiving yards and three receiving touchdowns.

In the 2007 season opener against the Miami Dolphins, Randle El recorded five receptions for a career-high 162 yards.

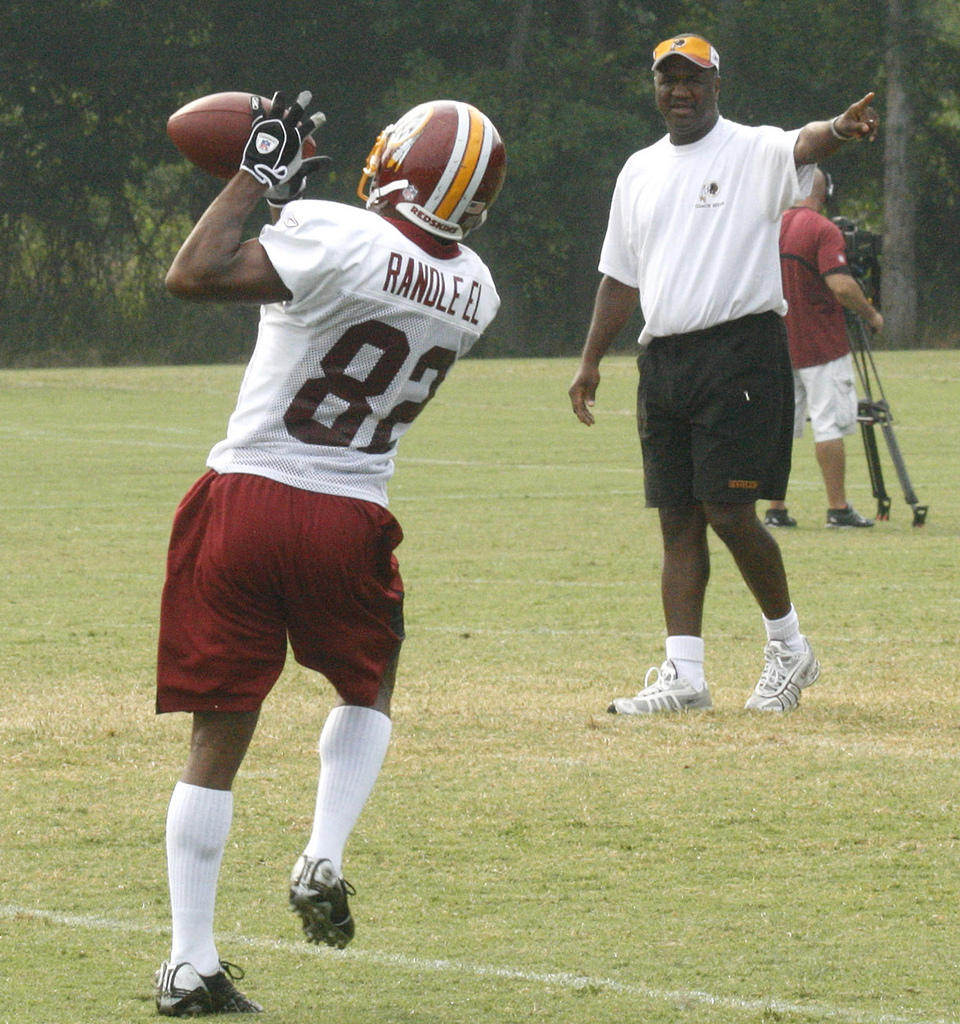
Randle El at Redskins 2008 Training Camp.

In addition, he was the Redskins' emergency quarterback. In December 2007, Randle El was inactive in a loss to Buffalo with a hamstring injury. This was his first game missed in his six-year NFL career, ending a run of 91 consecutive regular season starts. In the 2007 season, Randle El finished with 51 receptions for 728 receiving yards and one receiving touchdown. In the Wild Card Round against Seattle, Randle El had ten receptions for 94 receiving yards and one receiving touchdown in the 35–14 loss.

In the 2008 season, Randle El recorded 53 receptions for 593 receiving yards and four receiving touchdowns. In the 2009 season, Randle El recorded 50 receptions for 530 receiving yards in 16 games. In January 2010, Randle El was named in the Bleacher Report's Pittsburgh Steelers All-Decade team for defense and special teams, as a punt returner. He was also named fifth in USA Today's All-Decade kick returners. Randle El was among ten players released by the Redskins on March 4, 2010. The move came as a result of a number of personnel changes in Washington, with new head coach and executive vice president Mike Shanahan – signed alongside new offensive coordinator Kyle Shanahan – opting to make room in the Redskins' depth chart and salary outgoings in preparation of the 2010 free agency period. Randle El stated that he was "shocked" at the move, commenting that "with a new GM and a new coach, I thought you'd be given a shot to show them what you can do."

=== Pittsburgh Steelers (second stint) ===
On March 8, 2010, Randle El again signed with the Pittsburgh Steelers in a three-year deal worth $7 million, with a $900,000 signing bonus. He was active in all sixteen regular season games, with 22 receptions for 253 yards. In a Week 4 loss to the Baltimore Ravens, Randle El was the team's leading receiver with 50 yards, including a season-longest 34-yard catch. Following the Steelers bye week, Randle El had a twelve-yard receiving touchdown overturned, in a week six loss to the New Orleans Saints. In Week 9, Randle El threw for a touchdown pass to wide receiver Mike Wallace in a win over the Cincinnati Bengals, following a hand-off from Ben Roethlisberger. Randle El threw for a second passing touchdown in the Steelers' final regular season game against the Cleveland Browns, completing a pass to Hines Ward. The pass added to his career passer rating of 157.5 from 21 completed passes of a possible 26, the highest career rating of any player with more than twenty completions. Randle El scored a rushing two-point conversion in Super Bowl XLV to bring the Steelers to within three points of Green Bay in the fourth quarter. However, the Steelers would lose to Green Bay 31– 25. He was released by the team on July 28, 2011.

=== Retirement ===
After not playing during the 2011 season, Randle El announced his retirement from professional football on July 13, 2012. In 2013, he became the athletic director at Virginia Academy in Ashburn, Virginia, a Christian high school he helped found.

In a 2016 interview with the Pittsburgh Post-Gazette, Randle El expressed regret over playing professional football due to growing memory problems and difficulty walking up and down stairs that he has faced since retirement. He mentioned that he could still be playing baseball at his age had he pursued that path after being drafted by the Chicago Cubs.

== Career statistics ==
Legend
	Won the Super Bowl
**Bold**	Career high

=== NFL ===
==== Regular season ====
Year	Team	Games		Receiving						Rushing				
Year	Team	GP	GS	Tgt	Rec	Yds	Avg	Lng	TD	Att	Yds	Avg	Lng	TD
2002	PIT	16	0	65	47	489	10.4	36	2	**19**	**134**	**7.1**	24	0
2003	PIT	16	1	56	37	364	9.8	32	1	15	75	5.0	**32**	0
2004	PIT	16	7	63	43	601	14.0	39	3	8	34	4.3	12	0
2005	PIT	16	15	70	35	558	**15.9**	**63**	1	12	73	6.1	43	0
2006	WAS	16	16	63	32	351	11.0	34	3	**19**	118	6.2	20	0
2007	WAS	15	13	77	51	**728**	14.3	54	1	4	-3	-0.8	1	0
2008	WAS	16	16	**87**	**53**	593	11.2	31	**4**	1	5	5.0	5	0
2009	WAS	16	3	77	50	530	10.6	44	0	—	—	—	—	—
2010	PIT	16	0	39	22	253	11.5	34	0	1	2	2.0	2	0
Career		143	71	597	370	4,467	12.1	63	15	79	438	5.5	43	0

==== Postseason ====
Year	Team	Games		Receiving						Rushing				
Year	Team	GP	GS	Tgt	Rec	Yds	Avg	Lng	TD	Att	Yds	Avg	Lng	TD
2002	PIT	2	0	16	9	**138**	15.3	30	0	**2**	**14**	**7.0**	**11**	0
2004	PIT	2	0	6	4	58	14.5	34	0	—	—	—	—	—
2005	PIT	4	4	**18**	**12**	119	9.9	20	**1**	1	5	5.0	5	0
2007	WAS	1	1	14	10	94	9.4	19	**1**	1	2	2.0	2	0
2010	PIT	3	0	3	2	50	**25.0**	**37**	0	—	—	—	—	—
Career		12	5	57	37	459	12.4	37	2	4	21	5.3	11	0

=== College football ===
Year	Team	Games			Passing								Rushing			
Year	Team	GP	GS	Record (Note: Accounts for only GS as a QB. On 9/6/01 Randle El started at WR.)	Cmp	Att	Pct	Yds	Avg	TD	Int	Rate	Att	Yds	Avg	TD
1997	Indiana	0	0	—	Redshirted (redshirt)											
1998	Indiana	11	11	4–7	127	273	46.5	1,745	6.4	6	11	99.4	227	873	3.8	10
1999	Indiana	11	11	4–7	150	279	53.8	2,277	8.2	17	7	137.4	224	788	3.5	13
2000	Indiana	11	11	3–8	133	277	48.0	1,783	6.4	10	14	103.9	218	1,270	5.8	13
2001	Indiana	11	11	5–5	118	231	51.1	1,664	7.2	9	5	120.1	188	964	5.1	8
Career		44	44	16–27	528	1,060	49.8	7,469	7.0	42	37	115.1	857	3,895	4.5	44

=== College basketball ===
Year	Team	GP	GS	MPG	FG%	3P%	FT%	RPG	APG	SPG	BPG	PPG
1998–99	Indiana	11	0	6.7	.368	.286	.000	.7	1.0	.7	—	1.5
Career		11	0	6.7	.368	.286	.000	.7	1.0	.7	—	1.5

=== College baseball ===
Season	Team	G	AB	R	H	2B	3B	HR	RBI	SB	CS	BB	SO	BA
2000	Indiana	13	12	2	1	0	0	0	1	2	0	2	5	.083
Career		13	12	2	1	0	0	0	1	2	0	2	5	.083

== Coaching career ==
=== Tampa Bay Buccaneers ===
On January 16, 2019, Randle El joined the coaching staff of the Tampa Bay Buccaneers as an offensive assistant, reuniting with his former wide receivers coach and offensive coordinator Bruce Arians. Randle El was a part of the coaching staff of the Buccaneers team that won Super Bowl LV.

=== Detroit Lions ===
On February 9, 2021, it was announced that Randle El was hired by the Detroit Lions as their new wide receivers coach under head coach Dan Campbell.

=== Chicago Bears ===
On January 24, 2025, Randle El was hired by the Chicago Bears as their new wide receivers/assistant head coach under new head coach Ben Johnson. Randle El had worked with Johnson in Detroit.

== Personal life ==
Randle El's younger brother, Marcus, was a wide receiver and kick returner for the University of Wisconsin, while his older brother, Curtis, was a defensive back at Indiana University. Randle El is married. The couple have four children. Randle El also has three children from previous relations, totaling seven children. Randle El is a Christian.

Randle El co-hosted Redskins Gameday on WTTG during the 2007 season. Randle El participated in the coverage of the 2008 NFC Divisional playoff game between the New York Giants and the Philadelphia Eagles for NFL Network, holding an interview after the game with safety Brian Dawkins. The next week, he traveled to cover the AFC championship game between his former team, the Pittsburgh Steelers, and the Baltimore Ravens. After the game, he held interviews with some of his former teammates, including Ben Roethlisberger, Troy Polamalu, and Hines Ward.

Randle El made several appearances in television commercials for Easterns Automotive Group, a local car dealership group on the DC and Baltimore areas, alongside Chris Cooley, Clinton Portis, Jason Campbell, Chief Zee, Santana Moss, Willis McGahee.
