= Clinton Portis =

American football player and coach (born 1981)

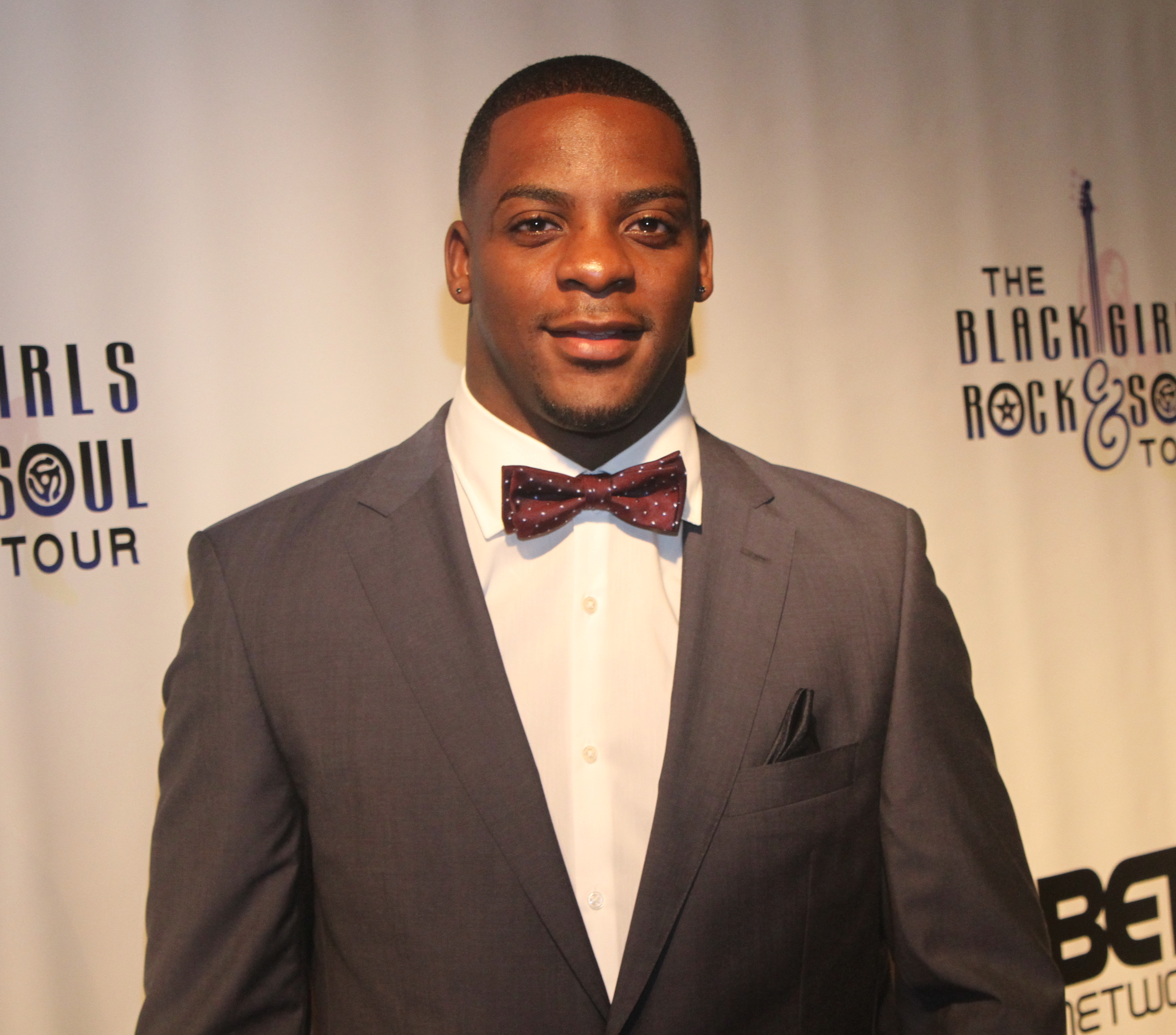
- Portis in 2011

No. 26
- Position: Running back

Personal information
- Born: September 1, 1981 (age 45); Laurel, Mississippi, U.S.
- Listed height: 5 ft 11 in (1.80 m)
- Listed weight: 219 lb (99 kg)

Career information
- High school: Gainesville (Gainesville, Florida)
- College: Miami (FL) (1999–2001)
- NFL draft: 2002: 2nd round, 51st overall pick

Career history

Playing
- Denver Broncos (2002–2003); Washington Redskins (2004–2010)

Coaching
- Delaware State (2025) Running backs coach

Awards and highlights
- NFL Offensive Rookie of the Year (2002); Second-team All-Pro (2008); 2× Pro Bowl (2003, 2008); PFWA All-Rookie Team (2002); Washington Commanders 90 Greatest; BCS national champion (2001); Third-team All-American (2001); First-team All-Big East (2001)

Career NFL statistics
- Rushing attempts: 2,230
- Rushing yards: 9,923
- Rushing touchdowns: 75
- Receptions: 247
- Receiving yards: 2,018
- Receiving touchdowns: 5
- Stats at Pro Football Reference

Clinton Earl Portis (born September 1, 1981) is an American former professional football running back who played in the National Football League (NFL) for nine seasons. For one season, he was the running backs coach at Delaware State University (DSU). He played college football for the Miami Hurricanes. He was selected by the Denver Broncos in the second round of the 2002 NFL draft. Portis was best known for being the starting running back for the Washington Redskins for seven seasons, in which he gained an average of 81.2 yards rushing per game, for which a select panel of celebrities included him as one of the 80 Greatest Redskins.

== College career ==
Portis attended the University of Miami, where he played for the Hurricanes. He considered going to the University of South Carolina but a fight that he had at Gainesville High School resulted in his scholarship being taken away. He became just the second true freshman to start at running back since the 1975 season. Portis set a school freshman record with five 100-yard performances, and led the team with 838 yards and eight touchdowns on 143 carries (5.9 avg.) in 10 games. He also caught four passes for 44 yards (11.0 avg.) and 2 touchdowns. When Portis was still a relative unknown, Lee Corso singled out Portis's performance during a defeat by Florida State for hustling and never giving up, saying "that kid can play for me any time".

Portis' sophomore season was not as successful as he rushed for 485 yards and two touchdowns on 77 carries (6.3 avg.) in eight games. He also added 103 yards on five receptions (20.6 avg.).

However, Portis bounced back in 2001 as the Hurricanes won the National Championship and Portis had his best season rushing for 1,200 yards and 10 touchdowns on 220 carries (5.5 avg.). He also added 125 receiving yards. In the Rose Bowl against Nebraska, Portis ran for 104 yards and a touchdown. He also had a long touchdown reception called back on a holding call.

Clinton was inducted into the UM Sports Hall of Fame on April 10, 2013, at a ceremony in Miami.

=== Track and field ===
Portis was also a standout track athlete for the Gainesville High School track team. He was timed at 10.6 seconds in the 100 meters. He was a member of the varsity track team. He took part in the state record 4 × 100 meter relay team, that finished with a time of 40.8 seconds. He also posted a personal bests of 2.01 meters in the high jump, and 6.91 meters in the long jump.

He also ran track and field for the University of Miami, where he won the state championship in the 4 × 400-meter relay. He also recorded personal best of 6.93 seconds in the 60 meters and 21.82 seconds in the 200 meters.

Personal bests

Event	Time (seconds)	Venue	Date
60 meters	6.93	Syracuse, New York	February 19, 2000
200 meters	21.82	Piscataway, New Jersey	May 6, 2000

== Professional career ==
=== Denver Broncos (2002–2003) ===
Portis was selected 51st overall by the Denver Broncos in the second round of the 2002 NFL draft. After three games he became the starting running back and over the final 12 games he surpassed 100 rushing yards seven times and scored 14 touchdowns, a performance that earned him Associated Press Offensive Rookie of the Year honors. He finished his debut season with a franchise‑rookie record 1,508 rushing yards and 17 total touchdowns. In 2003 he rushed for more than 100 yards in 11 of his 13 games and set a team record when he scored five rushing touchdowns in a Week 14 win over Kansas City. Despite missing three games, Portis amassed 1,591 rushing yards – the third‑highest single‑season total in club history – and earned his first Pro Bowl invitation. He became just the third player in NFL history to rush for at least 1,500 yards in each of his first two seasons, and his 5.5‑yard rushing average over those seasons remains the highest for any player with at least 500 carries.

=== Trade to Washington (2004) ===
On March 4, 2004, the Broncos traded Portis to the Washington Redskins in exchange for Pro Bowl cornerback Champ Bailey and a second‑round draft pick (used to select running back Tatum Bell). Contemporary reports described the deal as a rare swap of elite players and draft compensation.

=== Washington Redskins ===
==== 2004 season ====
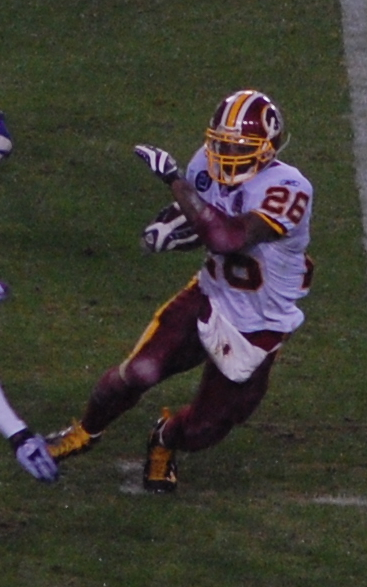
Portis with the Washington Redskins, 2007

Portis joined head coach Joe Gibbs' run‑oriented offense in Washington. On his first carry as a Redskin he broke free for a 64‑yard touchdown against the Tampa Bay Buccaneers and finished his debut with 148 rushing yards in a 16–10 win. He went on to log 343 carries for 1,315 rushing yards and five touchdowns and also caught 40 passes for 205 yards. Washington finished 6–10, and Portis started 15 of 16 games. Ladell Betts, selected five picks after Portis in the 2002 draft, served as his primary backup for the entirety of Portis' tenure in Washington.

==== 2005 season ====
In 2005 Portis set a franchise record with 1,516 rushing yards, breaking Stephen Davis' 2001 mark of 1,432 yards. He topped 100 rushing yards in nine games and scored 11 touchdowns while Washington improved to 10–6 and clinched its first playoff berth since 1999. Portis recorded six touchdowns during a five‑game winning streak to close the regular season, helping the club win a Wild Card game before falling in the divisional round.

==== 2006 season ====
Portis separated his left shoulder during a preseason game on August 13 and was held out of the Week 2 contest while recovering. He returned to start seven of the first nine games but fractured his right hand in Week 9 and subsequently underwent shoulder surgery; Washington placed him on injured reserve on 15 November. Limited by the injuries, he finished the year with 523 rushing yards and seven touchdowns in eight games.

==== 2007 season ====
Fully healthy again in 2007, Portis reclaimed his starting role and carried the ball 325 times for 1,262 yards and 11 touchdowns while catching a career‑high 47 passes for 389 yards. His all‑around production helped Washington return to the playoffs; Portis scored the winning touchdown against the Jets in Week 9 and finished the season tied for the league lead in carries.

==== 2008 season ====
Portis enjoyed one of the finest years of his career in 2008. Operating as the focal point of first-year head coach Jim Zorn's offense, he helped lead Washington to a 6–2 start while emerging as the NFL's leading rusher and one of the league's leading candidates for the NFL Most Valuable Player Award.

Portis was particularly dominant during the month of October. He rushed for 575 yards over a four-game span, including a season-high 175 yards against the Cleveland Browns. During this stretch, backup running back Ladell Betts suffered a knee injury that sidelined him for several weeks, prompting Washington to sign veteran Shaun Alexander for depth while relying even more heavily on Portis as the centerpiece of its offense. Portis became just the second player in NFL history, alongside O. J. Simpson, to record two separate streaks of five consecutive games with at least 120 rushing yards. His outstanding play earned him NFC Offensive Player of the Month honors for October.

By the end of October, Portis had rushed for 944 yards and seven touchdowns through eight games, leading the NFL in rushing and putting him on pace to challenge the 2,000-yard rushing mark. With Washington sitting at 6–2, national media outlets widely regarded Portis as one of the league's leading MVP candidates.

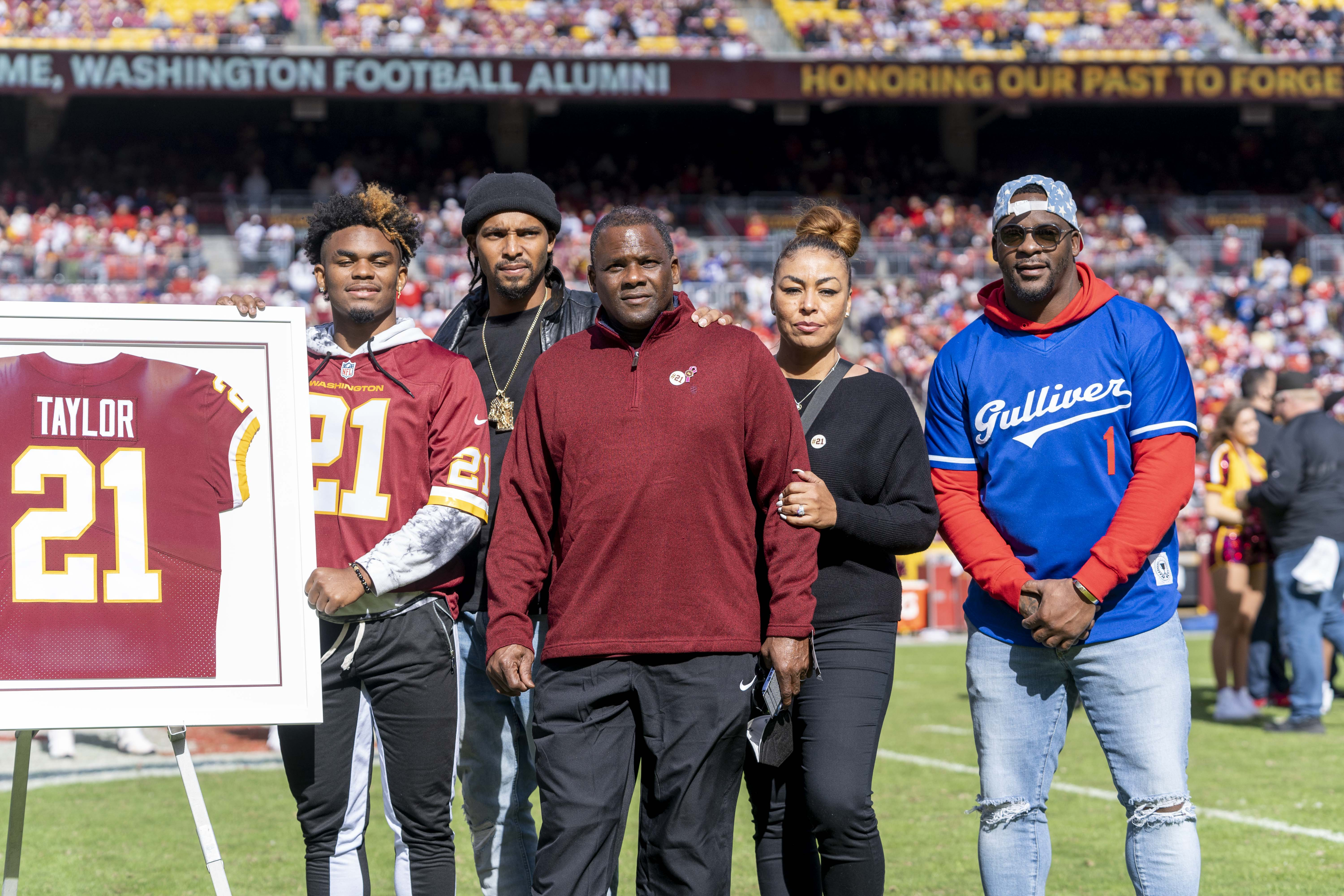
Portis (right) with the family of Sean Taylor during the Taylor's jersey retirement ceremony

Portis remained the NFL's rushing leader through late November before a series of nagging injuries limited his production over the final five games. He rushed for only 281 yards during that stretch as Washington lost four of its last five games to finish 8–8 and miss the playoffs. Despite the late-season decline, Portis finished the season with 1,487 rushing yards and nine rushing touchdowns on 342 carries while adding 218 receiving yards. He finished third in the NFL in rushing, earned his second career Pro Bowl selection and was named Second-team All-Pro. His 2008 campaign is widely regarded as one of the best individual seasons by a Washington running back in the modern era.

==== Later years and retirement ====
Recurring injuries limited Portis to eight games in 2009 and five games in 2010, and Washington released him in February 2011. He officially announced his retirement in August 2012. Portis ended his career with 9,923 rushing yards and 75 rushing touchdowns, ranking second in Washington franchise history behind John Riggins.

== Career statistics ==
Legend
	Led the league
**Bold**	Career high

=== NFL ===
Year	Team	GP	Rushing						Receiving							Fumbles	
Year	Team	GP	Att	Yds	Avg	Lng	TD	FD	Tgt	Rec	Yds	Avg	Lng	TD	FD	Fum	Lost
2002	DEN	16	273	1,508	**5.5**	59	**15**	**79**	49	33	364	**11.0**	66	**2**	16	5	3
2003	DEN	13	290	**1,591**	**5.5**	65	14	76	51	38	314	8.3	72	0	10	3	1
2004	WAS	15	343	1,315	3.8	64	5	65	57	40	235	5.9	18	**2**	10	5	4
2005	WAS	16	**352**	1,516	4.3	47	11	74	41	30	216	7.2	23	0	13	3	2
2006	WAS	8	127	523	4.1	38	7	29	26	17	170	10.0	**74**	0	5	0	0
2007	WAS	16	325	1,262	3.9	32	11	61	**60**	**47**	**389**	8.3	54	0	**19**	**6**	**5**
2008	WAS	16	342	1,487	4.3	31	9	75	35	28	218	7.8	29	0	11	3	3
2009	WAS	8	124	494	4.0	**78**	1	19	12	9	57	6.3	10	1	2	1	1
2010	WAS	5	54	227	4.2	27	2	12	9	5	55	**11.0**	14	0	4	0	0
Career		113	2,230	9,923	4.5	78	75	490	340	247	2,018	8.2	74	5	90	26	19

=== College ===
Season	Team	GP	Rushing				Receiving		
Season	Team	GP	Att	Yds	Avg	TD	Rec	Yds	TD
1999	Miami	10	143	838	5.9	8	4	44	**2**
2000	Miami	8	77	485	**6.3**	2	5	103	0
2001	Miami	11	**220**	**1,200**	5.5	**10**	**12**	**125**	1
Totals		29	440	2,523	5.7	20	21	272	3

== Coaching career ==
On February 20, 2025, Portis was hired by Delaware State University as the running backs coach as part of the new staff under new head coach, DeSean Jackson. Following the 2025 season, Delaware State confirmed that Portis had left the team and hired former professional running back, Steve Broussard, to take over as the team's new running backs coach in February 2026.

== In popular culture ==
During his career with the Washington Redskins, Portis made several appearances in TV commercials for Easterns Automotive Group, a local car dealership group on the DC and Baltimore areas, alongside Jason Campbell, Antwaan Randle El and Chris Cooley.

Portis' Redskins jersey was featured prominently in the 2007 film Transformers, worn by actor Anthony Anderson's character Glen Whitmann.

== Personal life ==
Portis is the cousin of former Washington Valor quarterback Josh Portis.

Portis is the father of seven sons and three daughters. Portis' son, Camden, plays cornerback and committed to Portis' alma mater, University of Miami, as a 2026 prospect in October 2024.

Due to mismanagement by his financial advisors that caused him to lose multiple homes, Portis filed for bankruptcy protection in December 2015, and as of 2017 lived in a two-bedroom apartment in Northern Virginia. In a 2017 interview with Sports Illustrated, Portis admitted that he contemplated murdering his former advisors.

=== Criminal fraud ===
In December 2019, Portis was named as one of 12 former NFL players accused of defrauding the league's health program by filing a total of $3.9 million in false claims. He was charged with one count of conspiracy to commit wire fraud and health care fraud, one count of wire fraud, and one count of health care fraud by the United States Department of Justice. He pleaded not guilty to the charges in February 2020. He was indicted on the same charges in a superseding case on July 24, 2020. In September 2021, the Department of Justice announced that Portis had pleaded guilty to obtaining $99,264 in benefits for medical equipment that was not actually provided. He was sentenced on January 6, 2022, to six months in prison and an additional six months of home confinement beginning in March 2022.

=== Controversial views ===
In May 2007, during the ongoing investigations into the dog-fighting crimes of former NFL player Michael Vick, Portis defended Vick, saying: "I don't know if he was fighting dogs or not. But it's his property; it's his dogs. If that's what he wants to do, do it." When told that dog fighting was a felony, Portis replied, "It can't be too bad of a crime." Portis said that he thought dog fighting was a “prevalent” part of life, adding: "I know a lot of back roads that got a dog fight if you want to go see it. But they're not bothering those people because those people are not big names." That same day, he later released a statement through the Redskins' official website that claimed he did not take part in, nor condone, dog fighting.
