= Randy Thomas (American football) =

American football player (born 1976)

No. 77
- Position: Guard

Personal information
- Born: January 19, 1976 (age 50); East Point, Georgia, U.S.
- Listed height: 6 ft 5 in (1.96 m)
- Listed weight: 306 lb (139 kg)

Career information
- College: Mississippi State
- NFL draft: 1999: 2nd round, 57th overall pick

Career history
- New York Jets (1999–2002); Washington Redskins (2003–2009); Miami Dolphins (2010)*
- * Offseason or practice squad member only

Awards and highlights
- NFL All-Rookie Team (1999); Second-team All-SEC (1998)

Career NFL statistics
- Games played: 143
- Games started: 143
- Fumble recoveries: 3
- Stats at Pro Football Reference

Randy Thomas (born January 19, 1976) is an American former professional football player who was a guard in the National Football League (NFL). He played college football for the Mississippi State Bulldogs and was selected by the New York Jets in the second round of the 1999 NFL draft.

Thomas was also a member of the Washington Redskins and Miami Dolphins.

== Early life ==
Thomas did not start playing football until he was talked into it from some of his closest friends in the tenth grade at Tri Cities High School. He gained special recognition in the state of Georgia as a tight end. Thomas also lettered in basketball, playing both forward and center, and played baseball on the prep level, where he was a pitcher.

== College career ==
Prior to his career at Mississippi State, Thomas was an All-America, All-State & all-Region selection as a two-year starter at "tight" guard at Copiah-Lincoln Community College. He was rated the best JUCO lineman in the state by the Jackson Clarion-Ledger and the fifth-best player overall. He helped Copiah-Lincoln to a 15–5 record during his junior college career, including 8-2 his freshman campaign. Thomas started every game in his two years at Mississippi State after transferring from junior college. He quickly established himself as one of the Bulldogs’ top offensive linemen. Earned 1st-team all-Southeastern Conference honors and was also an SEC Academic Honor Roll recipient. He started all 12 games at RG, led the team with 90 knockdowns as he showed excellent consistency for an offense that gained 3870 yards.

On October 4, 2016, Thomas was named to the 2016 SEC Football Legends Class.

== Professional career ==
=== New York Jets ===
Thomas was drafted 57th overall in the second round of the 1999 NFL draft by the New York Jets.

He started all 16 games during his rookie season in 1999 and helped Curtis Martin rush for a team-record 1,464 yards and achieve six 100-yard rushing games. He also kept the Jets sack-free for four games. In 2000, he started all 16 games at right guard and did not miss one snap during the entire season. He played a key role on an offensive line that tied Indianapolis Colts for fewest sacks allowed during the regular season (20) and helped the Jets offense become one of the most dangerous in the NFL, averaging 337.2 yards per game (12th best in the NFL). The passing offense, which averaged 245.3 yards per game, was sixth best in the league. The offensive line shut out opposing defenses five times in the sack category, the best mark in the league. Thomas played and started 13 games for the New York Jets in 2001, missing three games due to an ankle injury. He helped the squad finish with 2,054 (128.4 avg.) rushing yards, good for fourth in the NFL and second in the AFC. He assisted the team to rush for 125 yards or more in eight contests and helped the team average four yards or more in ten games. Thomas helped allow the team to top the 300 total yard mark seven times during the season and assisted in the offense not allowing a sack in five contests. Thomas was the starting right guard for the New York Jets for all 16 games of the 2002 season, clearing the path for Curtis Martin's 1,094 rushing yards on the year. He made his 50th career start, in week five against Kansas City and helped open holes for Martin's 119 yards on the ground. Thomas also helped pave the way for the teams 180 yards rushing and a 41–0 win over the Colts in the AFC wild card game.

=== Washington Redskins ===
Thomas came to the Redskins for the 2003 season, where he solidified the right guard position and teamed with right tackle Jon Jansen to form a formidable right side of the offensive line for the Redskins offense. Thomas along with John Hall, Laveranues Coles, and Chad Morton were officially nicknamed "The Jetskins," a nickname given to them for all leaving the New York Jets and signing with the Washington Redskins the same year in 2003. Starting all 16 games in 2003, he blocked well for a group of Redskin running backs led by Trung Canidate's 600 rushing yards and was solid in pass protection for Patrick Ramsey and Tim Hasselbeck. He earned a nod as a Pro Bowl third alternate for his efforts. In 2004, he started 15 games at right guard, missing one game due to a severe hamstring injury and helping Clinton Portis rush for 1,315 yards that season.

On September 20, 2009, Thomas suffered a severe triceps injury in a game against the St. Louis Rams, tearing the muscle completely off the bone. He was released on March 4, 2010.

=== Miami Dolphins ===
Thomas signed with the Dolphins on August 18, 2010. He was released on August 25, after re-injuring his arm.

== Personal ==
During the 2004 offseason, Thomas opened up a Rib joint in suburban Atlanta called RT's. The restaurant specializes in southern-style barbecue ribs.

Also Thomas took on world-ranked professional eater Sonya Thomas (no relation) and was defeated in a shrimp eating contest.
