= 2008 Washington Redskins season =

NFL team season

- Owner: Daniel Snyder
- General manager: Vinny Cerrato
- Head coach: Jim Zorn
- Offensive coordinator: Sherman Smith
- Defensive coordinator: Greg Blache
- Home stadium: FedExField

Results
- Record: 8–8
- Division place: 4th NFC East
- Playoffs: Did not qualify
- All-Pros: RB Clinton Portis (2nd team)
- Pro Bowlers: RB Clinton Portis; OT Chris Samuels; FB Mike Sellers; TE Chris Cooley

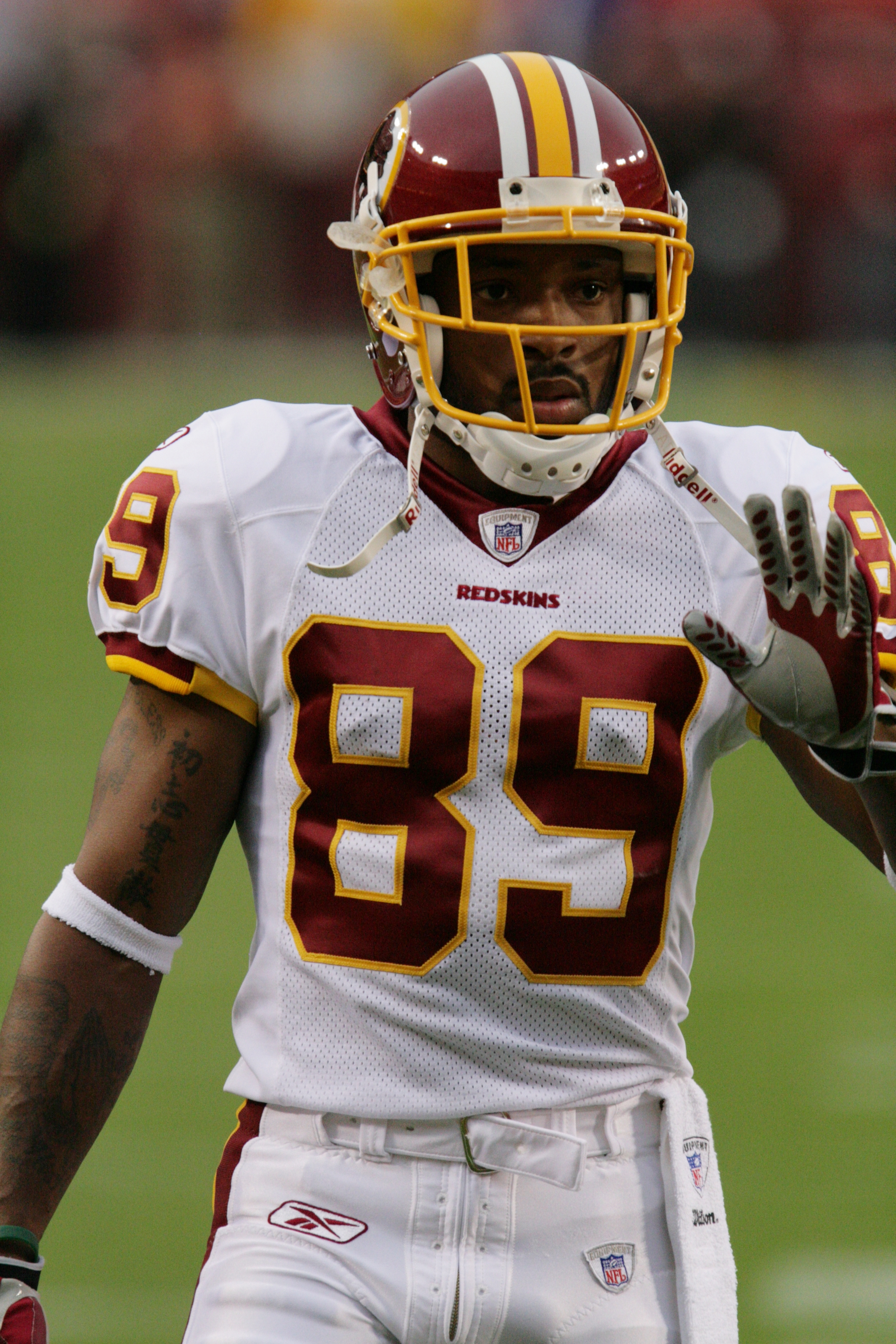
Redskins' wide receiver Santana Moss, 2008

The 2008 season was the Washington Redskins' 77th in the National Football League (NFL) and their first under head coach Jim Zorn.

They failed to improve upon their 9–7 record from 2007 and finished with an 8–8 record despite starting the season 6–2. In addition to their regular games with NFC East rivals, the Redskins played teams from the NFC West and AFC North as per the schedule rotation, and also played intraconference games against the Detroit Lions and the New Orleans Saints based on divisional positions from 2007.

== Offseason ==
The 2008 offseason opened with the announcement on January 8, 2008, of the retirement of head coach Joe Gibbs. The Redskins immediately began a national search for a new head coach. On January 25, 2008, Jim Zorn was hired as offensive coordinator. The following day, associate head coach Al Saunders and assistant head coach Gregg Williams were fired and Greg Blache was named defensive coordinator. On February 9, Jim Zorn was hired to be head coach. On February 15, Sherman Smith, the former running backs coach for the Tennessee Titans, was hired as an offensive coordinator.

=== Key departures ===
On February 26, 2008, the Redskins released WR Brandon Lloyd. Lloyd later signed with the Chicago Bears.

Mark Brunell, Reche Caldwell, Rick DeMulling, Randall Godfrey, Brian Kozlowski, David Macklin, Keenan McCardell, Pierson Prioleau, Mike Pucillo, and Omar Stoutmire were free agents and not re-signed by the Redskins.

On August 30, the Redskins released veterans Ryan Boschetti (DT), Derrick Frost (P), and Todd Wade (OT) .

=== Key additions ===
On May 27, 2008, the Redskins traded a conditional 2009 seventh-round draft pick to the Minnesota Vikings for DE Erasmus James. According to the terms of the deal, James must play in at least one regular season game in order for the Vikings to receive the draft pick.

On July 20, 2008, the Redskins traded a 2009 second-round draft pick and a 2010 sixth-round draft pick to the Miami Dolphins for DE Jason Taylor.

On November 6, 2008, the Redskins signed cornerback DeAngelo Hall to a one-year contract.

=== Free agents heading into the 2008 season ===
Position	Player	Free agency tag	Date signed	2008 team
DT	Ryan Boschetti	UFA	March 12	Washington Redskins
FB	Nehemiah Broughton	ERFA	April 2	Washington Redskins
QB	Mark Brunell	UFA	March 13	New Orleans Saints
WR	Reche Caldwell	UFA	March 25	St. Louis Rams
RB	Rock Cartwright	UFA	March 7	Washington Redskins
QB	Todd Collins	UFA	February 29	Washington Redskins
OL	Rick DeMulling	UFA		
OL	Jason Fabini	UFA	March 25	Washington Redskins
P	Derrick Frost	UFA	March 24	Washington Redskins
LB	Randall Godfrey	UFA		
TE	Brian Kozlowski	UFA		
CB	David Macklin	UFA	March 20	St. Louis Rams
WR	Keenan McCardell	UFA		
S	Pierson Prioleau	UFA	April 30	Jacksonville Jaguars
OL	Mike Pucillo	UFA		
S	Omar Stoutmire	UFA		
K	Shaun Suisham	ERFA	February 29	Washington Redskins

=== 2008 NFL draft ===
2008 Washington Redskins draft
Round	Pick	Player	Position	College	Notes
2	34	Devin Thomas	WR	Michigan State	from Oakland via Atlanta
2	48	Fred Davis	TE	USC	from Houston via Atlanta
2	51	Malcolm Kelly	WR	Oklahoma	
3	96	Chad Rinehart	OG	Northern Iowa	Compensatory pick
4	124	Justin Tryon	CB	Arizona State	from Tennessee
6	168	Durant Brooks	P	Georgia Tech	from St. Louis
6	180	Kareem Moore	S	Nicholls State	from Denver via St. Louis
6	186	Colt Brennan	QB	Hawaii	
7	242	Rob Jackson	DE	Kansas State	Compensatory pick
7	249	Chris Horton	S	UCLA	Compensatory pick
Made roster

The Redskins traded their #21 (1st round), #84 (3rd round), and #154 (5th round) selections to the Atlanta Falcons for their #34 (2nd round), #48 (2nd round), and #103 (4th round) selections. They then traded their #103 selection to the Tennessee Titans for their #124 (4th round) and #157 (5th round) selections. Lastly, they traded their #157 and #228 (7th round) selections to the St. Louis Rams for their #168 (6th round) and #180 (6th round) selections.

== Personnel ==
=== Staff / Coaches ===
2008 Washington Redskins staff
Front office: Owner – Daniel Snyder; General Manager / Executive VP of Football Operations: Vinny Cerrato; Director of Football Operations – Paul Kelly; Vice president of football administration – Eric Schaffer; Director of player personnel – Scott Campbell; Director of pro personnel – Morocco Brown; Administrative Assistant - Kathy Weyzen; Head coaches: Head coach / Quarterbacks – Jim Zorn; Assistant head coach / running backs – Stump Mitchell; Offensive coaches: Offensive coordinator – Sherman Smith; Wide receivers – Stan Hixon; Tight ends – Scott Wachenheim; Assistant Tight Ends Coach - Bill Khayat; Offensive line – Joe Bugel; Offensive assistant – Chris Meidt	Defensive coaches: Defensive coordinator – Greg Blache; Defensive line – John Palmero; Linebackers – Kirk Olivadotti; Defensive Passing Game Coordinator – Steve Jackson; Defensive Quality Control – Chris Garber; Special teams coaches: Special teams coordinator – Danny Smith; Assistant special teams – Richard Hightower; Video Assistant - Bobby Slowik; Strength and conditioning: Strength and conditioning – John Hastings; Strength and conditioning – Bobby Crumpler; Strength and Conditioning Assistant - Harrison Bernstein

=== Roster ===
2008 Washington Redskins roster
Quarterbacks (QB): 5 Colt Brennan; 17 Jason Campbell; 15 Todd Collins; Running backs (RB): 46 Ladell Betts; 31 Rock Cartwright; 26 Clinton Portis; 45 Mike Sellers FB; Wide receivers (WR): 12 Malcolm Kelly; 89 Santana Moss; 82 Antwaan Randle El; 11 Devin Thomas; 83 James Thrash; Tight ends (TE): 47 Chris Cooley; 86 Fred Davis; 87 Todd Yoder	Offensive linemen (OL): 78 D'Anthony Batiste G/T; 62 Devin Clark G; 69 Jason Fabini T; 74 Stephon Heyer T; 76 Jon Jansen T; 66 Pete Kendall G; 63 Will Montgomery G; 61 Casey Rabach C; 75 Chad Rinehart T; 77 Randy Thomas G; Defensive linemen (DL): 73 Ryan Boschetti DT; 99 Andre Carter DE; 92 Demetric Evans DE; 64 Kedric Golston DT; 96 Cornelius Griffin DT; 98 Rob Jackson DE; 94 Anthony Montgomery DT; 55 Jason Taylor DE; 95 Chris Wilson DE	Linebackers (LB): 54 H. B. Blades OLB; 50 Khary Campbell MLB; 51 Alfred Fincher OLB; 59 London Fletcher MLB; 52 Rocky McIntosh OLB; 97 Tyson Smith OLB; 53 Marcus Washington OLB; Defensive backs (DB): 25 Mike Green SS; 23 DeAngelo Hall CB; 48 Chris Horton SS; 30 LaRon Landry FS; 41 Kareem Moore FS; 22 Carlos Rogers CB; 27 Fred Smoot CB; 24 Shawn Springs CB; 20 Justin Tryon CB; Special teams (ST): 67 Ethan Albright LS; 1 Ryan Plackemeier P; 6 Shaun Suisham K	Practice squad: 56 Brandon Archer LB; 36 Nehemiah Broughton FB; 84 Horace Gant WR; 40 Michael Grant CB/S; 80 Marques Hagans WR; 71 Rueben Riley T; 72 Isaiah Ross G; 34 Byron Westbrook CB; Reserve: 79 Lorenzo Alexander DT (IR); 90 Alex Buzbee DE (IR); 93 Phillip Daniels DE (IR); 23 Reed Doughty S (IR); 68 Justin Geisinger G (IR); 60 Chris Samuels T (IR); 58 Matt Sinclair LB (IR); 57 Rian Wallace LB (IR); Rookies in italics 53 active, 8 reserve, 8 practice squad

== Preseason ==
=== Schedule ===
Week	Date	Opponent	Result	Record	Venue	Recap
HOF	August 3	Indianapolis Colts	W 30–16	1–0	Fawcett Stadium	Recap
1	August 9	Buffalo Bills	W 17–14	2–0	FedExField	Recap
2	August 16	at New York Jets	W 13–10	3–0	Giants Stadium	Recap
3	August 23	at Carolina Panthers	L 3–47	3–1	Bank of America Stadium	Recap
4	August 28	Jacksonville Jaguars	L 3–24	3–2	FedExField	Recap

=== Hall of Fame Game vs. Indianapolis Colts ===
Quarter	1	2	3	4	Total
Colts	3	10	3	0	16
Redskins	7	3	6	14	30

at Fawcett Stadium, Canton, Ohio

- Game weather: 76 °F (24.4 °C) (Clear)
- Game attendance: 22,216
- Referee: Walt Coleman
- TV announcers (NBC): Al Michaels (play-by-play), John Madden (color commentator), & Adam Schefter (sideline reporter)

Washington started the game on a high note when they recovered a surprise onside kick by the Colts. Three plays later, quarterback Jason Campbell threw a touchdown pass to Antwaan Randle El and gave the Redskins a 7–0 lead. The Colts responded on their own drive which ended in a field goal by K Adam Vinatieri. In the second quarter, Colts C Jamey Richard snapped the ball over the head of the QB and it sailed out of the endzone for a safety. Later in the quarter, the Colts scored a touchdown when QB Quinn Gray threw a 30-yard pass to WR Onrea Jones. After a missed field goal attempt by Shaun Suisham, the Colts were able to end the first half with a field goal of their own making the halftime score Colts 13 – Redskins 10. The Colts received the ball following halftime and marched down the field to score another field goal. The Redskins responded with a drive resulting in a 20-yard touchdown pass from QB Colt Brennan to WR Maurice Mann. The Redskins were able to follow up with another touchdown drive when Brennan hit RB Marcus Mason on a 5-yard pass. After the Colts got the ball back a couple of series later, QB Jared Lorenzen threw an interception to Redskins CB Matteral Richardson who took it back for a touchdown and sealed the victory for the Redskins. The Redskins had two former players, WR Art Monk and CB Darrell Green, inducted into the Pro Football Hall of Fame.

=== Preseason Week 1 vs. Buffalo Bills ===
Quarter	1	2	3	4	Total
Bills	3	11	0	0	14
Redskins	7	7	3	0	17

at FedExField, Landover, Maryland

- Game weather: 81 °F (27.2 °C) (Sunny)
- Game attendance: 69,532
- Referee: Jeff Triplette
- TV announcers (CSN Mid-Atlantic): Mike Patrick (play-by-play), Joe Theismann (color commentator), & Kelli Johnson (sideline reporter)

The Redskins received the ball first but immediately gave it to the Bills when RB Marcus Mason fumbled during the kick return. After the turnover, the Redskins defense was able to hold the Bills to a field goal. Later in the 1st quarter, the Redskins drove down the field and RB Clinton Portis scored on a 1-yard rushing play on a 4th down. Two series later, the Redskins drove down the field again and QB Todd Collins passed to RB Ladell Betts on a screen play which resulted in a 12-yard touchdown. Buffalo responded with a drive of their own which resulted in a field goal. When the Redskins got the ball back after the field goal, Collins threw a pass which was intercepted by CB Ashton Youboty. QB J. P. Losman threw a touchdown pass to WR James Hardy and the Bills completed a successful 2-point conversion to tie the game before halftime. The second half was dominated by both defenses and the only score was a 46-yard field goal by Redskins K Shaun Suisham in the 3rd quarter.

=== Preseason Week 2 at New York Jets ===
Quarter	1	2	3	4	Total
Redskins	0	3	3	7	13
Jets	7	0	0	3	10

at Giants Stadium, East Rutherford, New Jersey

- Game weather: 80 °F (26.7 °C) (Clear)
- Game attendance: 76,132
- Referee: Scott Green
- TV announcers (CSN Mid-Atlantic): Mike Patrick (play-by-play), Joe Theismann (color commentator), & Kelli Johnson (sideline reporter)

The Jets scored first in this game when newly signed QB Brett Favre completed a 4-yard touchdown pass to TE Dustin Keller. The Redskins responded with a drive that ended with a 30-yard field goal from K Shaun Suisham. The Redskins had another chance to score later in the 2nd quarter, but that drive ended when QB Derek Devine threw an interception to CB James Ihedigbo at the Jets' 19-yard line. Neither team scored for the rest of the half. The Redskins received the ball first starting the 3rd quarter and ended a 51-yard drive with a 36-yard field goal from Suisham. Later in the 4th quarter, the Jets scored when K Mike Nugent kicked a 43-yard field goal. After two more drives stalled, the Redskins received the ball with 2:04 left in the game. QB Colt Brennan and the Redskins drove down the field and scored a touchdown when Brennan threw a short pass to TE Jason Goode who took it 33 yards to the endzone. The Jets received the ball again and had a chance to tie the game, but K Mike Nugent missed a 23-yard field goal as time expired.

=== Preseason Week 3 at Carolina Panthers ===
Quarter	1	2	3	4	Total
Redskins	0	0	3	0	3
Panthers	3	31	7	6	47

at Bank of America Stadium, Charlotte, North Carolina

- Game weather: 86 °F (30 °C) (Cloudy)
- Game attendance: 71,770
- Referee: Gene Steratore
- TV announcers (CSN Mid-Atlantic): Mike Patrick (play-by-play), Joe Theismann (color commentator), & Kelli Johnson (sideline reporter)

Although the game was close after the first quarter, the Panthers dominated the second quarter. Both RBs Jonathan Stewart and DeAngelo Williams rushed for a 50 and 60 yard TDs, respectively. WR Steve Smith scored on a fumble recovery and QB Jake Delhomme threw a 24-yard TD pass to TE Dante Rosario. The Redskins were finally able to get on the scoreboard with a field goal in the 3rd quarter, but only after Delhomme threw a screen pass to Steve Smith for a 33-yard touchdown. The high note for the Redskins was holding the Panthers to just 6 points (two field goals) in the 4th quarter.

=== Preseason Week 4 vs. Jacksonville Jaguars ===
Quarter	1	2	3	4	Total
Jaguars	7	10	0	7	24
Redskins	0	3	0	0	3

at FedExField, Landover, Maryland

- Game weather: 72 °F (22.2 °C) (Cloudy)
- Game attendance: 59,076
- Referee: Alberto Riveron
- TV announcers (NBC): Al Michaels (play-by-play), John Madden (color commentator), & Adam Schefter (sideline reporter)

For the second week in a row, the Redskins were held to just a field goal. The Jaguars scored on their second drive when QB David Garrard threw a 3-yard TD pass to WR Reggie Williams. The Jaguars were able to score again early in the second quarter when QB Cleo Lemon threw a 4-yard TD pass to TE Greg Estandia. Early in the 4th quarter, the Jaguars scored on their first play of the drive when QB Todd Bouman threw a 51-yard TD pass to WR Troy Williamson. After a 3–0 start to the pre-season, the Redskins suffered two consecutive defeats to close out their exhibition games.

== Regular season ==
=== Schedule ===
Week	Date	Opponent	Result	Record	Venue	Recap
1	September 4	at New York Giants	L 7–16	0–1	Giants Stadium	Recap
2	September 14	New Orleans Saints	W 29–24	1–1	FedExField	Recap
3	September 21	Arizona Cardinals	W 24–17	2–1	FedExField	Recap
4	September 28	at Dallas Cowboys	W 26–24	3–1	Texas Stadium	Recap
5	October 5	at Philadelphia Eagles	W 23–17	4–1	Lincoln Financial Field	Recap
6	October 12	St. Louis Rams	L 17–19	4–2	FedExField	Recap
7	October 19	Cleveland Browns	W 14–11	5–2	FedExField	Recap
8	October 26	at Detroit Lions	W 25–17	6–2	Ford Field	Recap
9	November 3	Pittsburgh Steelers	L 6–23	6–3	FedExField	Recap
10	Bye					
11	November 16	Dallas Cowboys	L 10–14	6–4	FedExField	Recap
12	November 23	at Seattle Seahawks	W 20–17	7–4	Qwest Field	Recap
13	November 30	New York Giants	L 7–23	7–5	FedExField	Recap
14	December 7	at Baltimore Ravens	L 10–24	7–6	M&T Bank Stadium	Recap
15	December 14	at Cincinnati Bengals	L 13–20	7–7	Paul Brown Stadium	Recap
16	December 21	Philadelphia Eagles	W 10–3	8–7	FedExField	Recap
17	December 28	at San Francisco 49ers	L 24–27	8–8	Candlestick Park	Recap

=== Standings ===
NFC East
	W	L	T	PCT	DIV	CONF	PF	PA	STK
^{(1)} New York Giants	12	4	0	.750	4–2	9–3	427	294	L1
^{(6)} Philadelphia Eagles	9	6	1	.594	2–4	7–5	416	289	W1
Dallas Cowboys	9	7	0	.563	3–3	7–5	362	365	L2
Washington Redskins	8	8	0	.500	3–3	7–5	265	296	L1

=== Week 1: at New York Giants ===
Quarter	1	2	3	4	Total
Redskins	0	7	0	0	7
Giants	10	6	0	0	16

at Giants Stadium, East Rutherford, New Jersey

- Game time: 7:00 PM EDT
- Game weather: 85 °F (29.4 °C) (Cloudy & Humid)
- Game attendance: 79,742
- Referee: Ed Hochuli
- TV announcers (NBC): Al Michaels, John Madden, & Andrea Kremer

The Redskins began their 2008 campaign on the road against their NFC East rival and defending Super Bowl champion New York Giants. In this annual kickoff game, coach Jim Zorn made his official NFL head coaching debut. In the first quarter, Washington trailed early as Giants QB Eli Manning closed out their opening drive with a 1-yard TD run. Later in the quarter, New York added onto their lead when John Carney kicked a 24-yard field goal. In the second quarter, the 'Skins continued to trail as Carney kicked two more field goals of 25 and 47 yards. Near the end of the half, Washington finally got on the board as QB Jason Campbell completed a 12-yard TD pass to WR Santana Moss. However, the second half was an all-out defensive struggle as New York held on for the win.

With the loss, the Redskins began their season at 0–1.

=== Week 2: vs. New Orleans Saints ===
Quarter	1	2	3	4	Total
Saints	0	10	14	0	24
Redskins	3	6	6	14	29

at FedExField, Landover, Maryland

- Game time: 1:00 PM EDT
- Game weather: 90 °F (32.2 °C) (Sunny)
- Game attendance: 88,246
- Referee: Bill Carollo
- TV announcers (Fox): Dick Stockton, Brian Baldinger, Brian Billick, & Laura Okmin

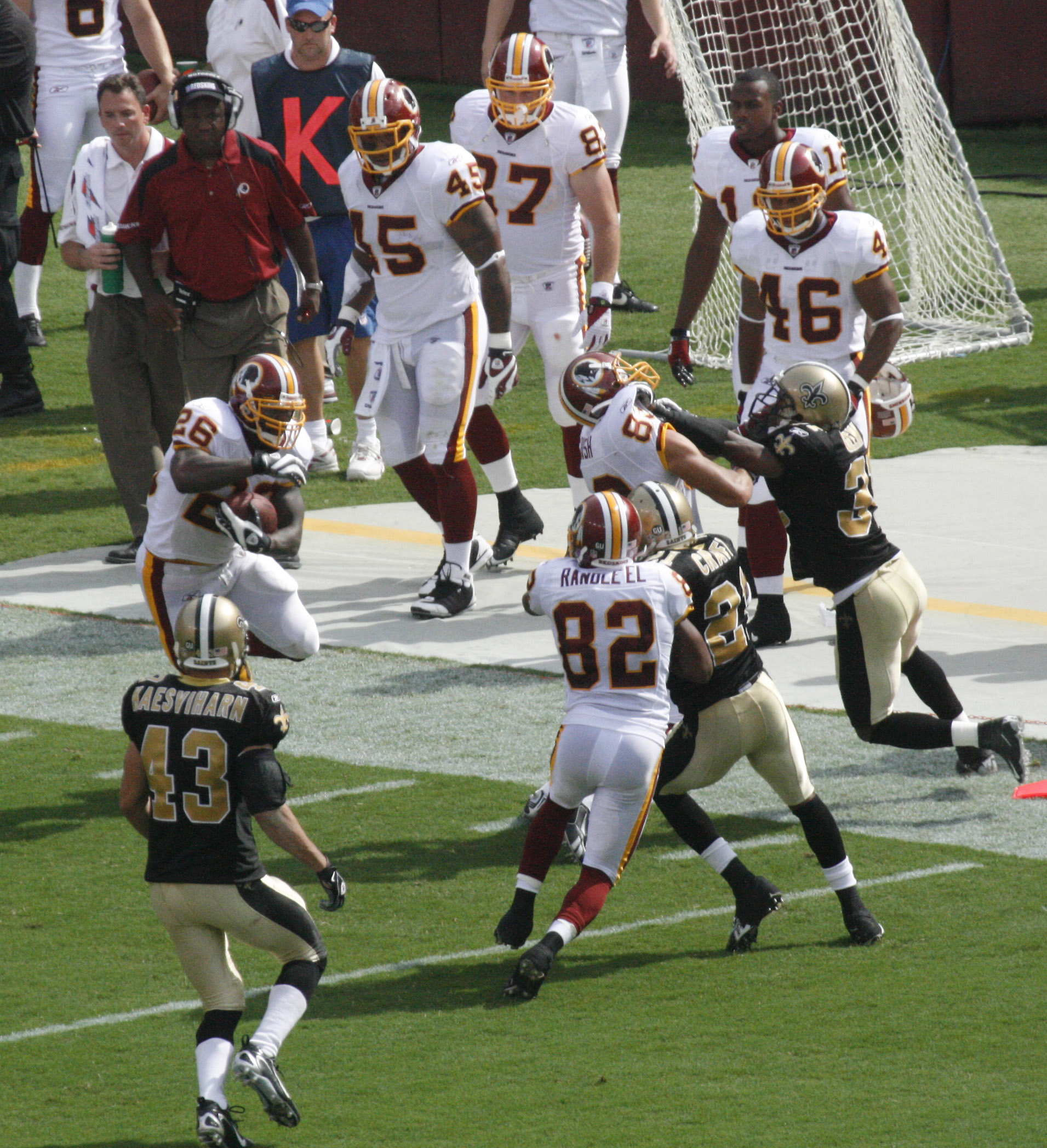
Against the Saints in week 2

Hoping to rebound from their divisional road loss to the Giants, the Redskins played their Week 2 home opener against the New Orleans Saints. In the first quarter, the 'Skins took the early lead when Shaun Suisham kicked a 22-yard field goal.

In the second quarter, Washington increased its lead with Suisham's 36-yard field goal. The Saints responded with RB Pierre Thomas's 1-yard TD run and kicker Martín Gramática's 49-yard field goal. This score marked the 269th consecutive game in which the Redskins allowed a point, tying the Cincinnati Bengals (1989–2006) for the longest streak ever.

In the third quarter, New Orleans increased its lead with QB Drew Brees completing a 19-yard TD pass to WR Robert Meachem. Afterwards, the 'Skins responded when RB Clinton Portis scored on a 9-yard TD run (with a failed 2-point conversion). The Saints responded with a Reggie Bush 55-yard punt return for a touchdown.

The Redskins were able to mount a fourth quarter comeback by rallying for 14 points in the final stanza. The comeback started with a Clinton Portis 8-yard TD run, and was completed when QB Jason Campbell threw a 67-yard TD pass to WR Santana Moss.

With the come from behind win, the Redskins improved to 1–1.

=== Week 3: vs. Arizona Cardinals ===
Quarter	1	2	3	4	Total
Cardinals	0	7	10	0	17
Redskins	7	3	7	7	24

at FedExField, Landover, Maryland

- Game time: 1:00 PM EST
- Game weather: 75 °F (23.9 °C) (Sunny)
- Game attendance: 90,060
- Referee: Alberto Riveron
- TV announcers (Fox): Kenny Albert, Daryl Johnston, & Tony Siragusa

The Redskins remained at home for Week 3 to play the Arizona Cardinals. In the first quarter, the Redskins scored first with RB Clinton Portis scoring on a 3-yard touchdown run. In the second quarter, Washington increased its lead when Shaun Suisham kicked a 48-yard field goal. The Cardinals closed out the first half with QB Kurt Warner completing a 4-yard TD pass to WR Anquan Boldin. In the third quarter, Arizona tied the game when kicker Neil Rackers made a 26-yard field goal attempt. The Redskins responded with QB Jason Campbell completing a 2-yard TD pass to TE Todd Yoder. Arizona followed with a 62-yard Warner TD pass to WR Larry Fitzgerald. In the fourth quarter, the Redskins pulled away with Campbell's 17-yard TD pass to WR Santana Moss.

With the win, the Redskins improved to 2–1, though infamously set a record for most consecutive games without a shutout at 270. As of 2025, this streak remains active.

=== Week 4: at Dallas Cowboys ===
Quarter	1	2	3	4	Total
Redskins	0	17	3	6	26
Cowboys	7	3	7	7	24

at Texas Stadium, Irving, Texas

- Game time: 4:15 p.m. EDT
- Game weather: 85 °F (29.4 °C) (Sunny)
- Game attendance: 63,462
- Referee: Walt Anderson
- TV announcers (Fox): Joe Buck, Troy Aikman, & Pam Oliver

After defeating the Cardinals at home, the Redskins flew to Texas Stadium for a divisional game with the Dallas Cowboys. The Cowboys led early when QB Tony Romo completed a 21-yard TD pass to TE Jason Witten in the first quarter. In the second quarter, Washington responded with 17 points. QB Jason Campbell threw touchdown passes of 3 & 2 yards to WR James Thrash and WR Antwaan Randle El respectively, and kicker Shaun Suisham added a 20-yard field goal. Dallas ended the first half scoring with a Nick Folk 36-yard field goal.

In the third quarter, the Cowboys tied the game with Romo throwing a 10-yard TD pass to WR Terrell Owens. The Redskins answered with a 33-yard field goal by Suisham. In the fourth quarter, Washington increased its lead with Suisham field goals of 33 and 29 yards. Dallas scored late in the game with an 11-yard Romo completion to WR Miles Austin. The Cowboys then attempted an onside kick, however, the kick was recovered by the Redskins and they were able to seal the victory.

With the win, the Redskins improved to 3–1.

Also, head coach Jim Zorn became the first Redskins rookie head coach since George Allen to earn a victory over the Cowboys in Dallas on his first attempt.

=== Week 5: at Philadelphia Eagles ===
Quarter	1	2	3	4	Total
Redskins	0	9	7	7	23
Eagles	14	0	0	3	17

at Lincoln Financial Field, Philadelphia, Pennsylvania

- Game time: 1:00 PM EDT
- Game weather: 66 °F (18.9 °C) (Sunny)
- Game attendance: 69,144
- Referee: Gene Steratore
- TV announcers (Fox): Joe Buck, Troy Aikman, & Pam Oliver

Coming off a road win over the Cowboys, the Redskins traveled to Lincoln Financial Field for a Week 5 NFC East duel with the Philadelphia Eagles. In the first quarter, the Redskins trailed early as RB Brian Westbrook scored on a 9-yard TD run and the Eagles DeSean Jackson returned a punt 68 yards for a touchdown. In the second quarter, Washington responded with Shaun Suisham kicking field goals of 41, 48, and 50 yards. In the third quarter, the Redskins took the lead on a trick play as WR Antwaan Randle El threw an 18-yard TD pass to TE Chris Cooley. In the fourth quarter, the Redskins increased their lead when Clinton Portis scored on a 4-yard TD run. Afterwards, the Eagles were unable to rally, only managing a 23-yard field goal by kicker David Akers.

With the win, the Redskins improved to 4–1.

=== Week 6: vs. St. Louis Rams ===
Quarter	1	2	3	4	Total
Rams	3	7	6	3	19
Redskins	7	0	0	10	17

at Fedex Field, Landover, Maryland

- Game time: 1:00 PM EDT
- Game weather: 72 °F (22.2 °C) (Sunny)
- Game attendance: 90,376
- Referee: Walt Coleman
- TV announcers (Fox): Kenny Albert, Daryl Johnston, & Tony Siragusa

The Redskins played the winless St. Louis Rams in week 6. The Redskins obtained an early lead when RB Clinton Portis scored on a 3-yard TD run. The Rams responded with a Josh Brown 51-yard field goal. St. Louis scored again later in the second quarter when free safety Oshiomogho Atogwe returned a fumble 75 yards for a touchdown. The Rams increased their lead as Brown kicked field goals of 25 and 44 yards early in the 2nd half. In the fourth quarter, Washington regained the lead with a Shaun Suisham 38-yard field goal and a Clinton Portis 2-yard rushing touchdown. St. Louis came back to win the game on a 49-yard Brown field goal.

With the unexpected loss, the Redskins fell to 4–2.

=== Week 7: vs. Cleveland Browns ===
Quarter	1	2	3	4	Total
Browns	0	0	3	8	11
Redskins	0	0	7	7	14

at Fedex Field, Landover, Maryland

- Game time: 4:15 PM EDT
- Game weather: 59 °F (15 °C) (Sunny)
- Game attendance: 90,487
- Referee: Terry McAulay
- TV announcers (CBS): Ian Eagle & Solomon Wilcots

The Redskins played at home for a Week 7 with the Cleveland Browns visiting. After a scoreless first half, the Redskins scored in the third quarter on a Clinton Portis 3-yard TD run. The Browns responded when kicker Phil Dawson made a 37-yard field goal. In the fourth quarter, Washington increased its lead as QB Jason Campbell completed an 18-yard TD pass to WR Santana Moss. After falling behind 14–3, Cleveland staged a late rally with QB Derek Anderson completing a 1-yard TD pass to WR Joshua Cribbs and a successful 2-point conversion pass to WR Braylon Edwards. The Browns had a chance to tie the score in the final seconds of the game, however, Phil Dawson's 54-yard field goal attempt went wide right and the Redskins prevailed.

Redskins Season Record: 5–2

=== Week 8: at Detroit Lions ===
Quarter	1	2	3	4	Total
Redskins	3	3	10	9	25
Lions	7	3	0	7	17

at Ford Field, Detroit, Michigan

- Game time: 1:00 PM EDT
- Game weather: None (Domed Stadium)
- Game attendance: 54,312
- Referee: John Parry
- TV announcers (Fox): Thom Brennaman, Brian Billick, & Charissa Thompson

The Redskins scored first when Shaun Suisham kicked a 25-yard field goal. Detroit running back Rudi Johnson scored on an 11-yard run at the end of the first quarter. In the second quarter, Detroit added to its lead on a 43-yard Jason Hanson field goal. Washington ended the half with another field goal.

In the third quarter, the Redskins regained the lead as Suisham made a 45-yard field goal. Washington scored again when Jason Campbell completed a 50-yard pass to wide receiver Santana Moss. In the fourth quarter, Moss returned a punt 80 yards for a touchdown. Lions quarterback Dan Orlovsky answered with a 17-yard pass to Calvin Johnson. Washington closed out the scoring with a Suisham field goal of 42 yards, and the Redskins won the game 25–17.

Redskins Season Record: 6–2

=== Week 9: vs. Pittsburgh Steelers ===
Quarter	1	2	3	4	Total
Steelers	0	10	6	7	23
Redskins	6	0	0	0	6

at Fedex Field, Landover, Maryland

- Game time: 8:30 PM EDT
- Game weather: 51 °F (10.6 °C) (Cloudy)
- Game attendance: 90,512
- Referee: Carl Cheffers
- TV announcers (ESPN): Mike Tirico, Ron Jaworski, Tony Kornheiser, Michele Tafoya, & Suzy Kolber

The Redskins donned their burgundy uniforms and played at home against the Pittsburgh Steelers in a special pre-election day edition of Monday Night Football.

The Steelers opened the game with a failed onside kick attempt which gave the Redskins position at their opponent's 41-yard line. The drive ended with a Shaun Suisham field goal. The Redskins regained possession on a tipped Ben Roethlisberger pass that was intercepted by Cornelius Griffin early in the first quarter. The drive resulted in another field goal giving Washington a 6–0 lead over the Steelers. In the second quarter, Steelers' Jeff Reed scored on a 35-yard field goal. Pittsburgh took the lead as they turned a blocked Ryan Plackemeier punt attempt into a 1-yard touchdown run by Roethlisberger, who exited the game following the score due to an injury to his shoulder and did not return.

In the second half, Byron Leftwich entered the game for the injured Roethlisberger. Pittsburgh rusher Willie Parker ran for a touchdown in the third quarter (with a failed extra point). Early in the fourth quarter, Leftwich completed a 5-yard touchdown reception to Santonio Holmes, giving the Steelers a 23–6 lead. Jason Campbell appeared to score a rushing touchdown later in the quarter but the ruling was reversed on a Pittsburgh challenge.

Byron Leftwich played for only one half and threw for 129 yards. Clinton Portis was held to 51 yards rushing. Jason Campbell was sacked seven times. His streak of avoiding an interception also ended at 249 pass attempts.

With the loss, the Redskins entered their bye week 6–3.

=== Week 11: vs. Dallas Cowboys ===
Quarter	1	2	3	4	Total
Cowboys	0	7	0	7	14
Redskins	7	3	0	0	10

at Fedex Field, Landover, Maryland

- Game time: 8:15 PM EDT
- Game weather: 44 °F (6.7 °C) (Clear)
- Game attendance: 90,830
- Referee: Jeff Triplette
- TV announcers (NBC): Al Michaels, John Madden, & Andrea Kremer

Coming off their bye week, the Redskins stayed at home for a Week 11 NFC East rematch with the Dallas Cowboys on Sunday Night Football. In the first quarter, the 'Skins struck first as QB Jason Campbell completed a 2-yard TD pass to FB Mike Sellers. In the second quarter, the Cowboys responded with RB Marion Barber 2-yard TD run. Washington closed out the half with kicker Shaun Suisham nailing a 41-yard field goal. After a scoreless third quarter, Dallas took the lead when Dallas QB Tony Romo completed a 25-yard TD pass to TE Martellus Bennett. The 'Skins attempted to mount a comeback, however the Cowboys’ defense was able to secure the win.

With the loss, the Redskins fell to 6–4.

=== Week 12: at Seattle Seahawks ===
Quarter	1	2	3	4	Total
Redskins	0	7	10	3	20
Seahawks	3	7	0	7	17

at Qwest Field, Seattle, Washington

- Game time: 4:15 p.m. EDT/1:15 PM PST
- Game weather: 49 °F (9.4 °C) (Sunny)
- Game attendance: 67,771
- Referee: Scott Green
- TV announcers (Fox): Matt Vasgersian, J.C. Pearson, & Nischelle Turner

Hoping to rebound from their divisional home loss to the Cowboys, the Redskins flew to Qwest Field for a Week 12 duel with the Seattle Seahawks. In the first quarter, the Redskins trailed early as the Seahawks Olindo Mare kicked a 45-yard field goal. In the second quarter, Washington took the lead as RB Ladell Betts scored on a 1-yard TD run. Seattle responded when QB Matt Hasselbeck connected with RB Maurice Morris on a 4-yard TD pass.

In the third quarter, the Redskins took the lead on successive scores by Shaun Suisham (26-yard field goal) and a Jason Campbell 8-yard TD pass to WR Antwaan Randle El. In the fourth quarter, the Seahawks tied the game when Hasselbeck completed a 10-yard TD pass to TE John Carlson. Afterwards, Washington regained the lead as Suisham nailed a 22-yard field goal. Late in the game, a Ledell Betts fumble opened the door for a Seattle comeback. However, Matt Hasselbeck threw an interception to CB Shawn Springs on the first play of the series with less than 2 minutes remaining in the game. The Redskins ran out the clock, and sealed the win in Seattle.

The game marked the return of Redskins head coach Jim Zorn and running back Shaun Alexander to their former team. Clinton Portis, who was questionable to play, led the running game with 143 yards. Washington ended a 2-game losing streak with the win.

With the win, Washington improved to 7–4.

=== Week 13: vs. New York Giants ===
Quarter	1	2	3	4	Total
Giants	10	3	7	3	23
Redskins	0	7	0	0	7

at FedExField, Landover, Maryland

- Game time: 1:00 PM EDT
- Game weather: 40 °F (4.4 °C) (Rainy)
- Game attendance: 85,912
- Referee: Tony Corrente
- TV announcers (Fox): Kenny Albert, Daryl Johnston & Tony Siragusa

The Redskins played at home for an NFC East division rematch against the New York Giants. Prior to the game, the franchise held a pregame ceremony where the late Sean Taylor was added to the Redskins Ring of Honor.

In the first quarter, Washington trailed early as Giants quarterback Eli Manning completed a 40-yard touchdown pass to wide receiver Amani Toomer. New York kicker John Carney also scored on a 31-yard field goal. In the second quarter, the Redskins continued to trail as Carney kicked a 38-yard field goal. Washington closed out the half as rookie wide receiver Devin Thomas ran for a 29-yard touchdown.

In the third quarter, New York answered with running back Brandon Jacobs scoring on a 1-yard touchdown run. In the fourth quarter, the Giants pulled away as Carney connected on a 39-yard field goal.

Redskins Season Record: 7–5

=== Week 14: at Baltimore Ravens ===
Quarter	1	2	3	4	Total
Redskins	0	0	0	10	10
Ravens	14	0	3	7	24

at M&T Bank Stadium, Baltimore, Maryland

- Game time: 8:15 PM EDT
- Referee: Terry McAulay
- TV announcers (NBC): Al Michaels, John Madden & Andrea Kremer

Washington traveled to Baltimore for an inter-conference game against the Ravens. Washington won the toss, and elected to receive the opening kick. Washington quarterback Jason Campbell was intercepted early in the drive by Ravens safety Ed Reed. Baltimore running back Le'Ron McClain converted the turnover into points when he scored a rushing TD on the ensuing Ravens possession. Later in the first quarter, the Ravens defense struck for a defensive touchdown when Ed Reed recovered a fumble from Washington running back Clinton Portis.

In the third quarter, Ravens kicker Matt Stover extended the Ravens lead with a 32-yard field goal. Early in the fourth quarter, Washington got on the board with a Shaun Suisham 43-yard field goal. Baltimore running back Willis McGahee fumbled on the Raven's next possession, and the Redskins cut the Ravens lead to 17–10 on a touchdown pass to Antwaan Randle El. The Redskins defense was unable to come up with another stop, and the Ravens ended their next drive with quarterback Joe Flacco throwing a touchdown pass to wide receiver Derrick Mason.

Redskins Season Record: 7–6

=== Week 15 at Bengals ===
Washington Redskins (7–6) at Cincinnati Bengals (1–11–1)

Quarter	1	2	3	4	Total
Redskins	0	10	0	3	13
Bengals	14	3	0	3	20

at Paul Brown Stadium • Cincinnati, Ohio

- Date: December 14
- Game time: 12:00 p.m. CDT
- Game weather: Cloudy • 49 °F (9 °C) • Wind 15 SSW
- Game attendance: 63,996
- Referee: Bill Leavy
- TV announcers (Fox): Kenny Albert, Daryl Johnston, and Tony Siragusa
- Game Book

Game information

Redskins

- Jason Campbell
  17/28, 167 Yds, TD
- Clinton Portis
  25 Rush, 77 Yds
- Santana Moss
  7 Rec, 72 Yds, TD

Bengals

- Ryan Fitzpatrick
  16/29, 209 Yds, TD
- Cedric Benson
  21 Rush, 73 Yds
  3 Rec, 88 Yds

Needing (most likely) a must-win situation to maintain any playoff chances. The Redskins travel to Cincinnati Ohio, visiting the Bengals. The Redskins fumbled the ball on their first possession, and it gave the Bengals field position at the Redskins' 41-yard line. Cincinnati quarterback Ryan Fitzpatrick scored in the first quarter with a 1-yard run. Fitzpatrick scored again in the quarter with a pass to wide receiver Chris Henry.

The Bengals began the second quarter with a Shayne Graham field goal. The Redskins later scored when quarterback Jason Campbell threw a touchdown pass to wide receiver Santana Moss halfway through the quarter. Shaun Suisham successfully kicked a short field goal near the end of the first half. The Bengals and Redskins exchanged field goals in the fourth quarter.

Scoring summary

Quarter	Time	Drive			Team	Scoring information	Score	
Quarter	Time	Plays	Yards	TOP	Team	Scoring information	WSH	CIN
1	10:30	6	41	3:38	Bengals	Fitzpatrick 1-yard touchdown run, Graham kick good	0	7
1	3:10	6	94	3:08	Bengals	Henry 12-yard touchdown reception from Fitzpatrick, Graham kick good	0	14
2	11:19	9	44	4:06	Bengals	32-yard field goal by Graham	0	17
2	4:44	8	40	4:03	Redskins	Moss 10-yard touchdown reception from Campbell, Suisham kick good	7	17
2	0:15	12	71	3:27	Redskins	23-yard field goal by Suisham	10	17
4	2:20	16	41	7:13	Bengals	45-yard field goal by Graham	10	20
4	1:43	4	–5	0:37	Redskins	36-yard field goal by Suisham	13	20
"TOP" = time of possession. For other American football terms, see Glossary of American football.							13	20

=== Week 16: vs. Philadelphia Eagles ===
Quarter	1	2	3	4	Total
Eagles	0	0	3	0	3
Redskins	0	3	7	0	10

at FedExField, Landover, Maryland

- Game time: 4:15 PM EDT
- Game weather: 42 °F (5.6 °C) (Sunny)
- Game attendance: 82,412
- Referee: Jerome Boger
- TV announcers (Fox): Joe Buck, Troy Aikman & Pam Oliver

Hoping to rebound from their embarrassing road loss to the Bengals, the Redskins went home for a Week 16 NFC East rematch with the Philadelphia Eagles. The game went scoreless until the Redskins were able to put together a long second quarter scoring drive. The drive began on their own 14-yard line with 11:55 left in the half, and ended 8½ minutes later on Shaun Suisham’s 33-yard field goal.

The Redskins intercepted Donovan McNabb in the third quarter, and took possession of the ball at the Philadelphia 19-yard line. Clinton Portis and Chris Cooley each helped move the ball to the 1-yard line, and Portis culminated the short drive with a touchdown run.

A 47-yard pass in the third quarter from Donovan McNabb to Brian Westbrook put the Eagles in position to score. They failed to convert a 3rd and 3 from the Washington 5-yard line, and settled for a 22-yard field goal by David Akers.

With 3:48 left in the game, the Eagles began a long drive that began at their own 9-yard line. With the ball at the Redskins 18-yard line and 12 seconds left in the game, Donovan McNabb completed a 17-yard pass to Reggie Brown. Fred Smoot and LaRon Landry tackled Brown to prevent him from breaking the goal line. With no timeouts remaining, the Eagles were unable to stop the clock or complete another play. The play was reviewed from the replay booth, and it was determined that Brown did not break the plane of the goal line and the on-field ruling was upheld.

Redskins Season Record: 8–7. They swept the season series against the Eagles for the first time since 2005. Washington was mathematically eliminated from playoff contention due to the Atlanta Falcons 24–17 victory over the Minnesota Vikings

=== Week 17: at San Francisco 49ers ===
Quarter	1	2	3	4	Total
Redskins	0	17	0	7	24
49ers	7	0	7	13	27

at Bill Walsh Field at Candlestick Park, San Francisco, California

- Game time: 4:15 PM EST
- Game weather: 50 °F (10 °C) (Cloudy)
- Game attendance: 67,519
- Referee: Peter Morelli
- TV announcers (Fox): Ron Pitts, Tony Boselli, & Charissa Thompson

Coming off their divisional home win over the Eagles, the Redskins closed out their season at Bill Walsh Field at Candlestick Park in a Week 17 duel with the San Francisco 49ers. Washington trailed early in the first quarter as 49ers quarterback Shaun Hill got a 2-yard touchdown run. The Redskins responded in the second quarter with running back Clinton Portis’ 4-yard touchdown run, kicker Shaun Suisham's 41-yard field goal, and quarterback Jason Campbell's 6-yard touchdown pass to wide receiver Antwaan Randle El.

In the third quarter, San Francisco answered with running back DeShaun Foster scoring on a 1-yard touchdown run. In the fourth quarter, the 49ers took the lead as Hill completed a 9-yard touchdown pass to wide receiver Jason Hill and a 33-yard field goal by 49ers kicker Joe Nedney. Washington tied the game as Campbell scored on a 2-yard touchdown run, however San Francisco prevailed as Nedney kicked a game-winning 39-yard field goal.

With the loss, the Redskins' season ended at 8–8.

== Awards ==
=== Players of the Week ===
- S Chris Horton was named NFC Defensive Player of the Week for games played September 14–15.
- S Chris Horton was named Diet Pepsi Rookie of the Week for games played on September 28–29.
- Head Coach Jim Zorn was named Motorola Coach of the Week for games played on September 28–29.
- RB Clinton Portis was named NFC Offensive Player of the Week for games played on October 5–6.
- RB Clinton Portis was named FedEx Ground Player of the Week for games played on October 5–6.
- RB Clinton Portis was named FedEx Ground Player of the Week for games played on October 19–20.
- WR/PR Santana Moss was named NFC Special Teams Player of the Week for games played on October 26–27.
- RB Clinton Portis was named FedEx Ground Player of the Week for games played on October 26–27.

=== Players of the Month ===
- S Chris Horton was named NFC Defensive Rookie of the Month for the month of September
- RB Clinton Portis was named NFC Offensive Player of the Month for the month of October.

=== Pro Bowlers ===
- RB Clinton Portis
- OT Chris Samuels
- FB Mike Sellers
- TE Chris Cooley

== Final statistics ==
=== Passing ===
Player	G	QB Rat.	Comp.	Att.	Pct.	Yards	TD	INT	Long	Sack
Jason Campbell	16	84.3	315	506	62.3	3,245	13	6	67	38
Antwaan Randle El	16	152.1	3	4	75.0	46	1	0	18	0

=== Rushing ===
Player	G	Att.	Yards	Y/G	Avg.	Long	TD	Fum	FumL
Clinton Portis	16	342	1,487	92.9	4.3	31	9	3	3
Jason Campbell	16	47	258	16.1	5.5	23	1	6	1
Ladell Betts	13	61	206	15.8	3.4	14	1	1	1
Devin Thomas	16	3	53	3.3	17.7	29	1	0	0
Santana Moss	16	1	27	1.7	27.0	27	0	1	1
Mike Sellers	16	6	24	1.5	4.0	10	0	1	1
Shaun Alexander	4	11	24	6.0	2.2	8	0	0	0
Rock Cartwright	16	5	14	0.9	2.8	7	0	0	0
Antwaan Randle El	16	1	5	0.3	5.0	5	0	0	0
Fred Davis	11	1	−3	−0.3	−3.0	−3	0	0	0

=== Receiving ===
Player	G	Rec.	Yards	Y/G	Avg.	Long	TD
Santana Moss	16	79	1044	65.3	13.2	67	6
Chris Cooley	16	83	849	53.1	10.2	28	1
Antwaan Randle El	16	53	593	37.1	11.2	31	4
Clinton Portis	16	28	218	13.6	7.8	29	0
Ladell Betts	13	22	200	15.4	9.1	27	0
Devin Thomas	16	15	120	7.5	8.0	18	0
Mike Sellers	16	12	98	6.1	8.2	20	1
James Thrash	16	9	81	5.1	9.0	29	1
Todd Yoder	16	8	50	3.1	6.3	14	1
Fred Davis	11	3	27	2.5	9.0	15	0
Malcolm Kelly	5	3	18	3.6	6.0	7	0
Shaun Alexander	4	1	9	2.3	9.0	9	0
Rock Cartwright	16	1	−7	−0.4	−7.0	−7	0
Pete Kendall	16	1	−9	−0.6	−9.0	−9	0

=== Kicking ===
Player	G	0–19	20–29	30–39	40–49	50+	FGM	FGA	Pct.	Long	XPM	XPA
Shaun Suisham	16	0–0	7–7	7–9	11–16	1–4	26	36	72.2	50	25	25

=== Punting ===
Player	G	Punt	Yards	Avg.	In20	In10	TB	Long
Ryan Plackemeier	10	55	2291	41.7	15	9	10	62
Durant Brooks	6	26	1030	39.6	9	2	0	60

=== Defense ===
Player	G	Tackles	Asst.	TotalTK	Sack	YdL	INT	Yards	TD	FumR
London Fletcher	16	96	37	133	0.5	1	0	0	0	1
Rocky McIntosh	16	61	27	88	2.0	13	1	4	0	0
Chris Horton	14	57	19	76	1.0	8	3	13	0	1
LaRon Landry	16	49	16	65	0.5	4	2	18	0	0
Carlos Rogers	16	49	7	56	0.0	0	2	73	0	0
Fred Smoot	16	43	11	54	0.0	0	1	0	0	0
H.B. Blades	16	41	19	60	0.0	0	0	0	0	0
Shawn Springs	9	31	5	36	1.0	9	1	0	0	0
Marcus Washington	10	25	19	44	0.0	0	0	0	0	0
Andre Carter	16	23	14	37	4.0	19	0	0	0	0
Jason Taylor	13	21	8	29	3.5	30	0	0	0	0
Demetric Evans	16	20	13	33	3.5	14	0	0	0	0
DeAngelo Hall	7	20	5	25	0.0	0	2	6	0	0
Kedric Golston	13	19	9	28	2.0	8	0	0	0	0
Mike Green	8	16	4	20	0.0	0	0	0	0	0
Cornelius Griffin	14	16	11	27	1.0	9	1	0	0	0
Anthony Montgomery	14	15	8	23	2.0	9	0	0	0	0
Reed Doughty	4	15	4	19	0.0	0	0	0	0	0
Lorenzo Alexander	15	11	6	17	2.0	11	0	0	0	0
Mike Sellers	16	11	2	13	0.0	0	0	0	0	0
Kareem Moore	14	11	6	17	0.0	0	0	0	0	0
Leigh Torrence	9	11	5	16	0.0	0	0	0	0	0
Khary Campbell	14	11	2	13	0.0	0	0	0	0	0
James Thrash	16	10	2	12	0.0	0	0	0	0	0
Chris Wilson	16	8	6	14	1.0	8	0	0	0	0
Rock Cartwright	16	6	3	9	0.0	0	0	0	0	0
Alfred Fincher	14	4	2	6	0.0	0	0	0	0	0
Justin Tryon	14	4	0	4	0.0	0	0	0	0	0
Shaun Suisham	16	3	0	3	0.0	0	0	0	0	0
Devin Thomas	16	3	3	6	0.0	0	0	0	0	0
Clinton Portis	16	3	0	3	0.0	0	0	0	0	0
Todd Yoder	16	2	1	3	0.0	0	0	0	0	0
Antwaan Randle El	16	2	0	2	0.0	0	0	0	0	0
Santana Moss	16	2	0	2	0.0	0	0	0	0	0
Ryan Boschetti	3	2	0	2	0.0	0	0	0	0	0
Rob Jackson	3	1	0	1	0.0	0	0	0	0	0
Casey Rabach	16	1	0	1	0.0	0	0	0	0	0
Ladell Betts	13	1	0	1	0.0	0	0	0	0	0
Ethan Albright	16	1	0	1	0.0	0	0	0	0	0
Jason Campbell	16	1	0	1	0.0	0	0	0	0	0
Chris Cooley	16	1	0	1	0.0	0	0	0	0	0
Chris Samuels	12	1	0	1	0.0	0	0	0	0	0
Stephon Heyer	9	1	0	1	0.0	0	0	0	0	0
