= Lorenzo Alexander =

American football player (born 1983)

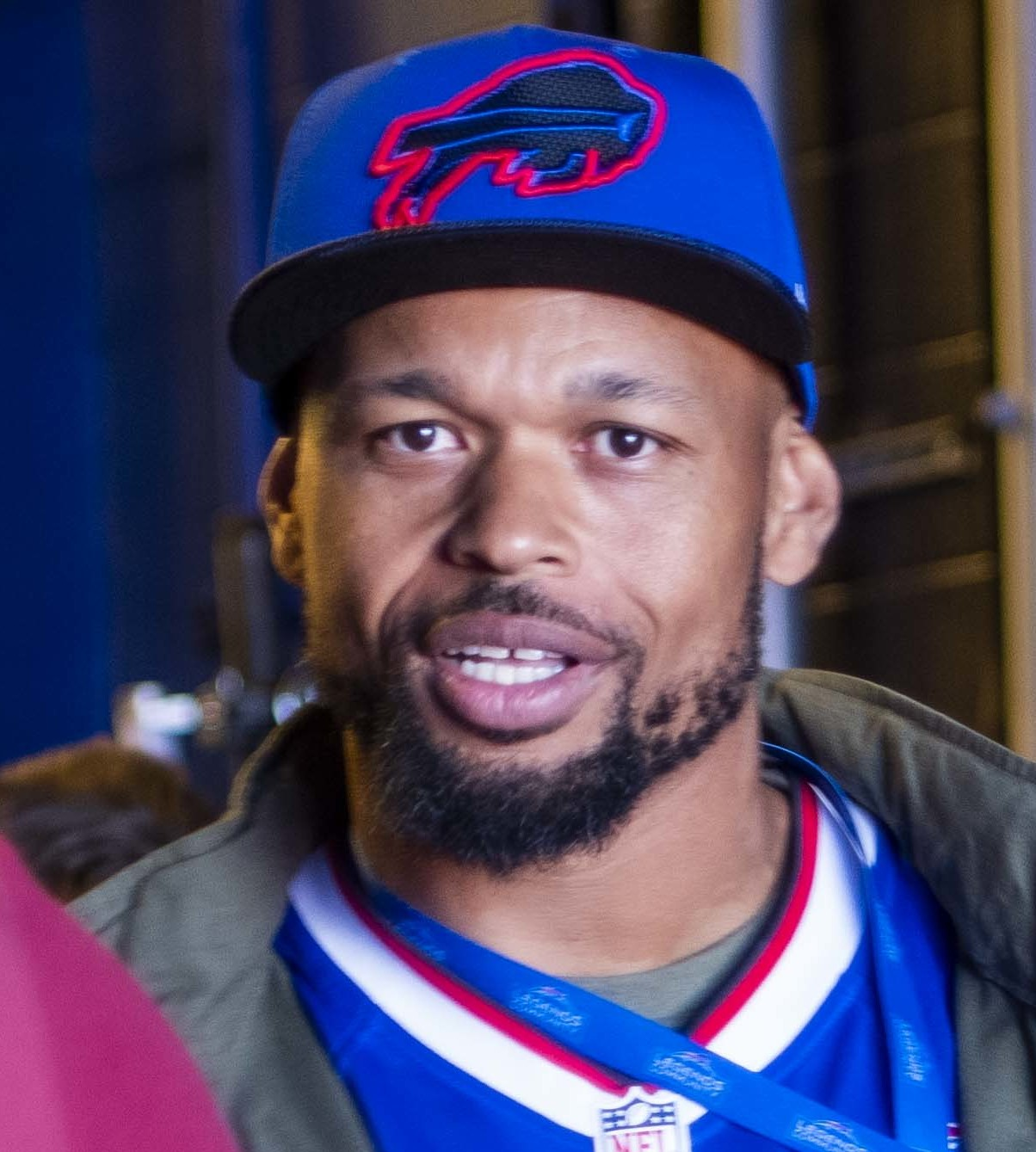
- Alexander in 2021

California Golden Bears
- Title: Assistant edges coach

Personal information
- Born: May 31, 1983 (age 43); Oakland, California, U.S.
- Listed height: 6 ft 1 in (1.85 m)
- Listed weight: 245 lb (111 kg)

Career information
- High school: Saint Mary's College (Albany, California)
- College: California (2001–2004)
- NFL draft: 2005: undrafted

Career history

Playing
- Carolina Panthers (2005–2006)*; Baltimore Ravens (2006)*; Washington Redskins (2006–2012); Arizona Cardinals (2013–2014); Oakland Raiders (2015); Buffalo Bills (2016–2019)
- * Offseason or practice squad member only

Coaching
- California (2026–present) Assistant edges coach

Awards and highlights
- Second-team All-Pro (2016); 2× Pro Bowl (2012, 2016); Second-team All-Pac-10 (2004)

Career NFL statistics
- Total tackles: 472
- Sacks: 33.0
- Forced fumbles: 12
- Fumble recoveries: 4
- Pass deflections: 31
- Interceptions: 3
- Stats at Pro Football Reference

Lorenzo John Alexander (born May 31, 1983) is an American former professional football player who was an outside linebacker for 15 seasons in the National Football League (NFL), primarily with the Washington Redskins. He played college football for the California Golden Bears, and was signed as an undrafted free agent by the Carolina Panthers in 2005.

Alexander was also a member of the Baltimore Ravens, Washington Redskins, Arizona Cardinals, Oakland Raiders, and Buffalo Bills.

== Early life ==
Alexander went to Saint Mary's College High School, where he played as a defensive lineman for the Panthers football team. He played in the first ever U.S. Army All-American Bowl game on December 30, 2000. Alexander went to the University of California, Berkeley.

== College career ==
In the 2001 season, Alexander played in all 11 games as a freshman. He recorded 24 tackles, one sack, and one fumble recovery. As a sophomore, he recorded 25 tackles, one sack and one fumble recovery. He won the Bob Tessier Award as the team's most improved defensive lineman. As a junior, he was named a team captain. He recorded 33 tackles and earned the Brick Muller Award as the team's most valuable defensive lineman. He played one more season for the Golden Bears in 2004.

== Professional career ==
Pre-draft measurables
Height	Weight	Arm length	Hand span	40-yard dash	10-yard split	20-yard split	20-yard shuttle	Three-cone drill	Vertical jump	Broad jump	Bench press
6 ft 2 in (1.88 m)	289 lb (131 kg)	31 1/4 in (0.79 m)	9 1/2 in (0.24 m)	5.17 s	1.86 s	3.04 s	4.55 s	7.53 s	29.5 in (0.75 m)	8 ft 10 in (2.69 m)	28 reps
All values from NFL Combine

=== Carolina Panthers ===
==== 2005 ====
On April 29, 2005, the Carolina Panthers signed Alexander to a three-year, $940,000 contract as an undrafted free agent.

Throughout training camp, Alexander competed for a roster spot against Atiyyah Ellison, Kris Jenkins, Charles Hill, and Eddie Freeman as a backup defensive tackle. On September 3, 2005, the Carolina Panthers waived Alexander as part of their final roster cuts, but signed him to their practice squad two days later.

==== 2006 ====
During training camp, Alexander competed against Jovan Haye, Atiyyah Ellison, and Kris Jenkins. On September 3, 2006, the Carolina Panthers officially waived Alexander as part of their final roster cuts.

=== Baltimore Ravens ===
On September 7, 2006, the Baltimore Ravens signed Alexander to their practice squad, but was subsequently released by the team just five days later.

=== Washington Redskins ===
On October 3, 2006, the Washington Redskins' signed Alexander to their practice squad. He spent the entire 2006 NFL season on the Redskins’ practice squad and played on the offensive line, defensive line, and also adapted to playing tight end.

==== 2007 ====
On January 12, 2007, the Washington Redskins signed Alexander to a three-year, $1.11 million contract. Head coach Joe Gibbs named Alexander the fifth defensive tackle on the Redskins’ depth chart to start the regular season, behind Cornelius Griffin, Kedric Golston, Anthony Montgomery, and Ryan Boschetti. On October 7, 2007, Alexander made his professional regular season debut and made one tackle during a 34–3 victory against the Detroit Lions in Week 5. In Week 8, he collected a season-high two combined tackles as the Redskins lost 52–7 at the New England Patriots. On November 11, 2007, Alexander made his first career start, as a tight end, during a 33–25 loss against the Philadelphia Eagles in Week 10. He finished his rookie season in 2007 with four combined tackles (two solo) in 13 games and one start and primarily appeared on special teams and as a backup defensive tackle.

The 2007 Washington Redskins finished third in the NFC East with a 9–7 record and earned a wildcard spot. On January 5, 2008, Alexander appeared in his first career playoff game as the Redskins lost 35–14 at the Seattle Seahawks in the NFC Wild Card Round. On January 8, 2008, head coach Joe Gibbs announced his decision to retire citing family obligations.

==== 2008 ====
Throughout training camp, Alexander competed for a roster spot as a backup defensive tackle against Matthias Askew, Ryan Boschetti, and Jonathan Mapu. Head coach Jim Zorn named Alexander the fourth backup defensive tackle on the depth chart to begin the season, behind Cornelius Griffin, Anthony Montgomery, and Kedric Golston. On November 23, 2008, Alexander collected a season-high three solo tackles and made his first career sack during a 20–17 win at the Seattle Seahawks in Week 12. Alexander sacked Seahawks’ quarterback Matt Hasselbeck for a seven-yard loss during the fourth quarter. In Week 16, Alexander made one tackle before exiting in the third quarter of the Redskins’ 10–3 victory against the Philadelphia Eagles due to a hamstring injury. On December 25, 2008, the Washington Redskins officially placed Alexander on injured reserve after tearing his hamstring. He finished the season with 17 combined tackles (11 solo), two pass deflections, and two sacks in 15 games and zero starts.

==== 2009 ====
Alexander entered training camp as a backup defensive tackle in 2009 and competed for a roster spot against Antonio Dixon, Kedric Golston, Vaka Manupuna, and Anthony Montgomery. Head coach Jim Zorn named Alexander a backup defensive tackle and backup defensive end to start the regular season. On December 13, 2009, Alexander collected a season-high three solo tackles and made one sack during the Redskins’ 34–13 win at the Oakland Raiders in Week 14. Alexander finished the 2009 NFL season with 23 combined tackles (18 solo), two sacks, one pass deflection, and one forced fumble in 16 games and zero starts.

==== 2010 ====
On January 4, 2010, the Washington Redskins announced their decision to fire head coach Jim Zorn after the Redskins finished with a 4–12 record in 2009. On February 27, 2010, it was reported that Alexander would switch to outside linebacker. Defensive coordinator Jim Haslett switched to a base 3-4 defense. On March 5, 2010, the Washington Redskins signed Alexander to a three-year, $3.15 million contract.

During training camp, Alexander competed against Andre Carter to be the starting right outside linebacker. Head coach Mike Shanahan named Alexander the backup outside linebacker, behind starters Andre Carter and Brian Orakpo, to begin the regular season.

“Well, you don't find many guys like Lorenzo. From top to bottom, he's the best special-teams player that I've been around of the guys that make plays consistently, both kickoff, kickoff return, special teams in general. He can run, he's a big guy, he's got a great attitude. He wants to make every play. He doesn't want to come out. If he's not in the Pro Bowl on special teams, I don't know who it'll be."

— Mike Shanahan
Washington Redskins’ head coach

On October 3, 2010, Alexander earned his first career start on defense and was named the starting right outside linebacker by head coach Mike Shanahan. He recorded four solo tackles during the 17–12 victory at the Philadelphia Eagles in Week 4. Alexander also delivered a hit on Philadelphia Eagles kickoff returner Jorrick Calvin during the game and prompted head coach Mike Shanahan to call it "one of the best hits I've been around since I've been in the NFL." On November 12, 2010, Alexander was named the special teams captain. In Week 15, Alexander collected a season-high five solo tackles during a 33–30 loss at the Dallas Cowboys. He finished the season with 57 combined tackles (32 solo), two pass deflections, two forced fumbles, and 1.5 sacks in 16 games and 12 starts.

==== 2011 ====
Alexander lost his starting role after the Redskins drafted Ryan Kerrigan 16th overall in the 2011 NFL draft. Head coach Mike Shanahan named Alexander the backup outside linebacker, behind Ryan Kerrigan and Brian Orakpo, to begin the regular season. Alexander continued to be captain of special teams throughout the 2011 season.

In Week 15, he collected a season-high four combined tackles during a 23–10 victory at the New York Giants. On December 28, 2011, it was announced that Alexander was selected as an alternate to the 2012 Pro Bowl. He finished the season with 15 combined tackles (nine solo) in 16 games and zero starts. Alexander primarily played on special teams and led the special teams unit with 21 tackles on punt and kickoff coverage. On January 5, 2012, it was announced that Alexander was chosen as the Redskins' nominee for the Walter Payton Man of the Year Award for the second straight year. He was also named the Redskins' 2011 Special Teams Player of the Year.

==== 2012 ====
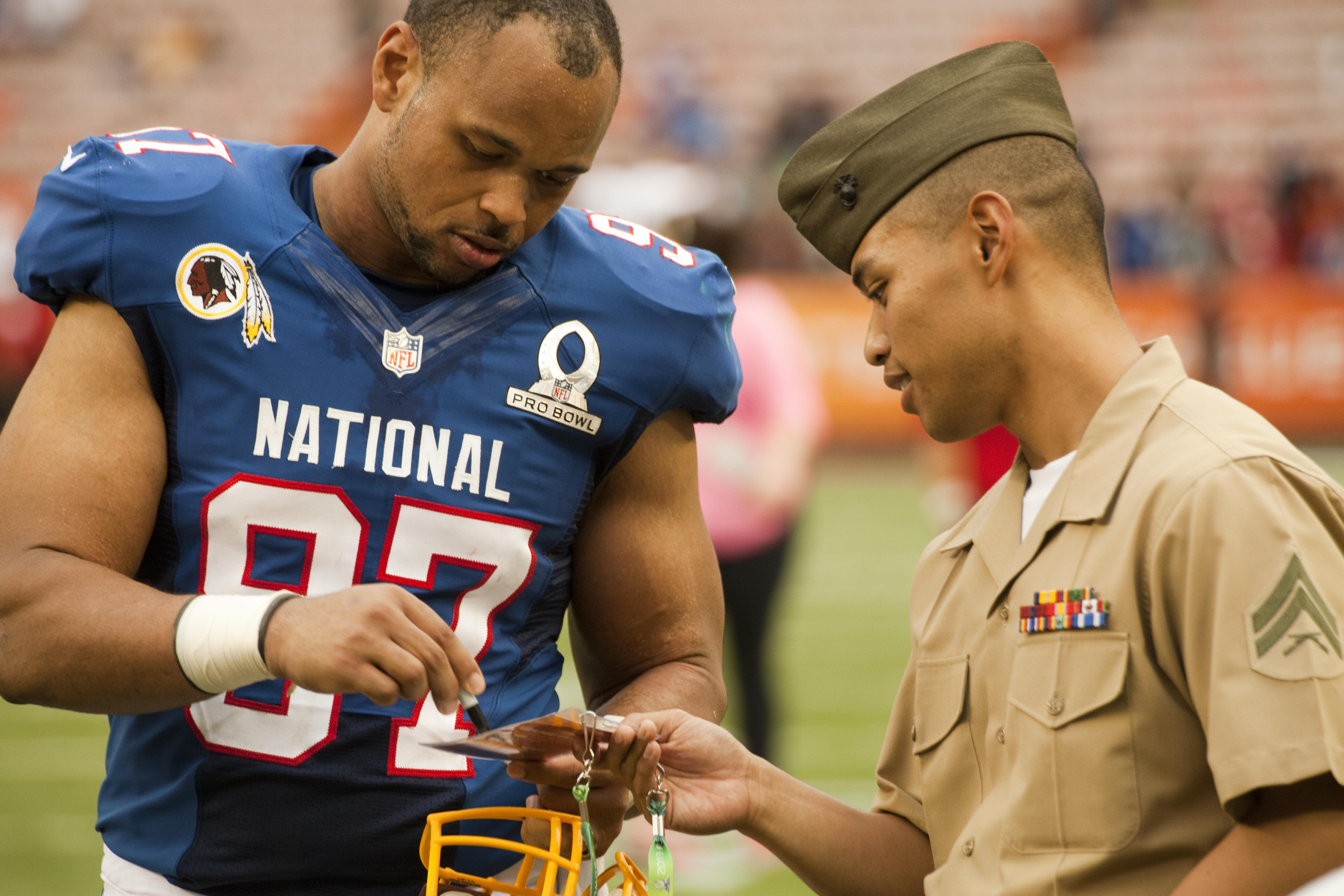
Alexander signing an autograph at the 2013 Pro Bowl

On April 17, 2012, Washington Redskins’ head coach Mike Shanahan announced his decision to transition Alexander from an outside linebacker to an inside linebacker to provide depth behind starting inside linebackers, London Fletcher and Perry Riley.

On September 21, 2012, he was fined $15,750 by the NFL for performing a horse collar tackle on wide receiver Danny Amendola during a 31–28 loss at St. Louis Rams in Week 2. On October 14, 2012, Alexander recorded five combined tackles and made a season-high 1.5 sacks during a 38–26 victory against the Minnesota Vikings. Alexander recorded 1.5 sacks on Christian Ponder and also recovered a fumble by Ponder that led to a touchdown on the following drive. In Week 16, Alexander collected a season-high seven combined tackles and one sack during a 27–20 win at the Philadelphia Eagles. On December 27, 2012, it was announced that Alexander was selected to play in the 2013 Pro Bowl as a special teams player. He finished the season with 46 combined tackles (34 solo) and 2.5 sacks in 16 games and zero starts.

==== 2013 ====
Alexander became an unrestricted free agent after the 2012 NFL season and received an offer to remain with the Redskins. Alexander stated the original offer was a three-year, $7.5 million contract that includes $2.6 million guaranteed. He stated he declined their offer after they changed the contract offer to $1.4 million guaranteed the following day with no explanation. A spokesman for the Washington Redskins claimed, “the statement is not true.” His departure from the team was considered a casualty of the $36 million salary cap penalty that the team suffered in the 2012 offseason. Alexander, himself, even stated "But I know, in my heart of hearts, if it wasn’t for the cap, I would’ve been here.”

=== Arizona Cardinals ===
On March 13, 2013, the Arizona Cardinals signed Alexander to a three-year, $9.5 million contract with $3 million guaranteed. Alexander entered training camp slated the starting weakside linebacker. Head coach Bruce Arians named Alexander and Sam Acho the starting outside linebackers to begin the regular season. They started alongside inside linebackers Karlos Dansby and Jasper Brinkley.

He started in the Arizona Cardinals’ season-opener at the St. Louis Rams and made four combined tackles and a pass deflection during a 27–24 loss. In Week 3, Alexander exited during the first quarter of the Cardinals’ 31–7 loss at the New Orleans Saints after injuring his right foot. On September 23, 2013, the Arizona Cardinals officially placed Alexander on injured reserve after it was discovered he had ruptured the Lisfranc ligament in his right foot.

==== 2014 ====
On April 3, 2014, Arizona Cardinals’ head coach announced his decision to move Alexander from outside linebacker to inside linebacker to provide depth after the departure of Karlos Dansby. Head coach Bruce Arians named Alexander the backup inside linebacker, behind Larry Foote and Kevin Minter, to begin the regular season. In Week 13, he collected a season-high three solo tackles and made one sack during a 29–18 loss at the Atlanta Falcons. He finished the season with 13 combined tackles (11 solo) and one sack in 16 games and zero starts.

==== 2015 ====
Alexander entered training camp slated as a backup outside linebacker and competed for a roster spot against Kareem Martin and Markus Golden. On August 31, 2015, the Arizona Cardinals released Alexander as part of their final roster cuts.

=== Oakland Raiders ===
On September 2, 2015, the Oakland Raiders signed Alexander to a one-year, $870,000 contract. Head coach Jack Del Rio named Alexander the backup strongside linebacker, behind Ray-Ray Armstrong, to begin the regular season. In Week 17, he collected a season-high six combined tackles during a 23–17 loss at the Kansas City Chiefs. He finished the season with 13 combined tackles (11 solo) in 16 games and zero starts.

=== Buffalo Bills ===
==== 2016 ====
On April 12, 2016, the Buffalo Bills signed Alexander to a one-year, $885,000 free agent contract with $75,000 guaranteed. On October 9, 2016, he had his first career three sack performance against the Los Angeles Rams. During a week five matchup against the Miami Dolphins, Alexander finished with five solo tackles, two tackles for-a-loss, and a sack. Alexander had a seven-game sack streak to start the season and his nine sacks in the first seven games tied his career sack total he had accumulated over the past decade. He was named AFC Defensive Player of the Month for October. On December 11, in a 27–20 loss to the Pittsburgh Steelers, Alexander had his first career interception, which he returned for 28 yards. He finished third in the league with a team-leading career-high 12.5 sacks, and a career-high 76 combined tackles, along with six passes defensed, three forced fumbles, and his first career interception.

On December 20, 2016, Alexander was named to the 2017 Pro Bowl roster at the outside linebacker position, which was his second Pro Bowl nomination. Alexander was named the Defensive MVP of the Pro Bowl, after a 20–13 AFC victory. He was also ranked 91st by his peers on the NFL Top 100 Players of 2017.

==== 2017 ====
On March 11, 2017, Alexander signed a two-year, $9 million contract extension with the Bills. He played in 16 games with 11 starts in 2017, recording 73 tackles, three sacks, three forced fumbles, and a pass deflection.

==== 2018 ====
In 2018, Alexander played in 16 games with eight starts, finishing fourth on the team with 74 tackles, second with 6.5 sacks, nine passes defensed, and two forced fumbles, and a career-high two interceptions.

==== 2019 ====
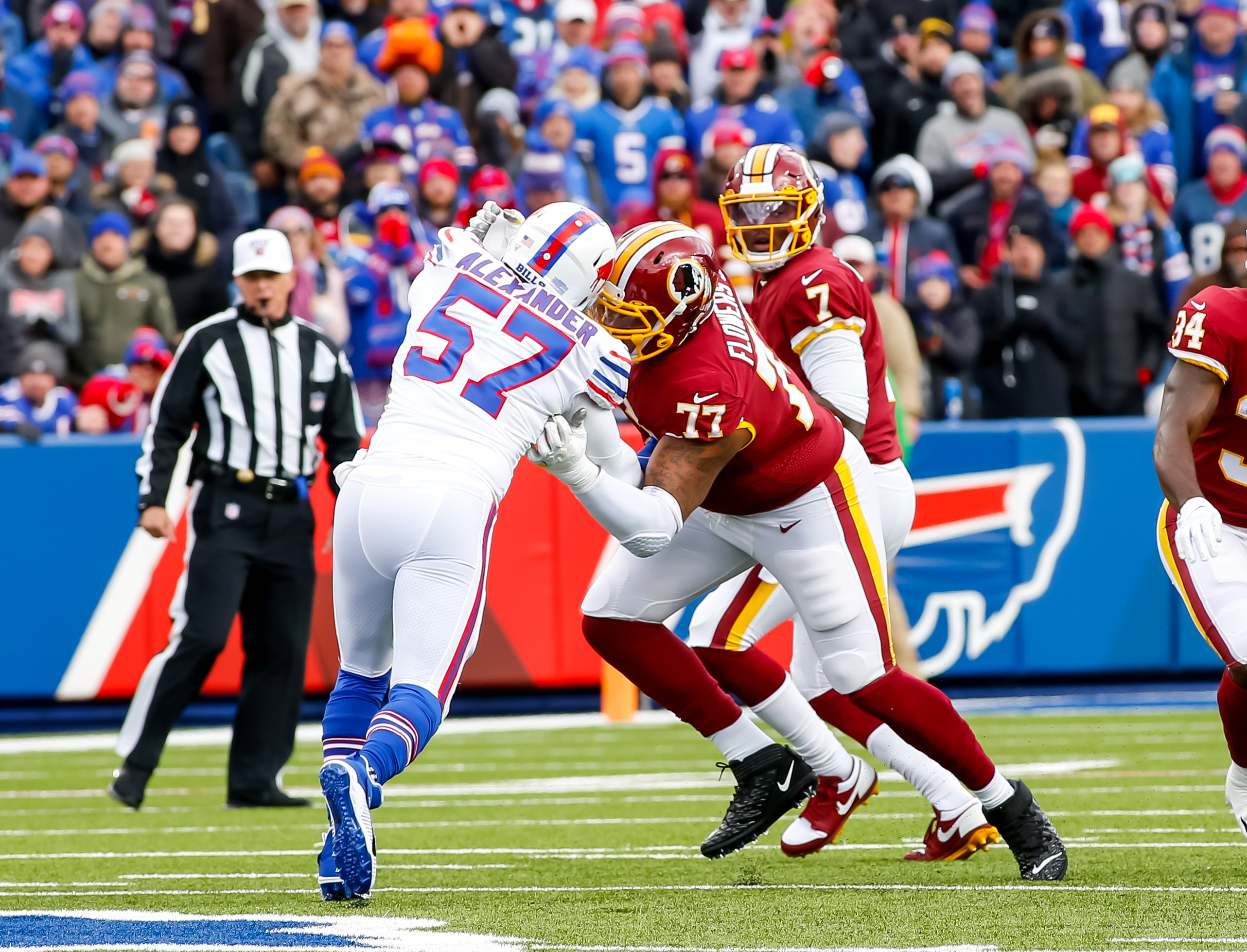
Alexander in a game against the Washington Redskins

On January 16, 2019, Alexander signed a one-year contract extension with the Bills. He played in all 16 games and recorded 55 total tackles, two sacks, one forced fumble, and nine passes defensed.

=== Retirement ===
Alexander announced his retirement after the Bills were eliminated from the 2019–20 playoffs.

== NFL career statistics ==
Legend
**Bold**	Career high

=== Regular season ===
Year	Team	Games		Tackles					Interceptions					Fumbles			
Year	Team	GP	GS	Cmb	Solo	Ast	Sck	TFL	Int	Yds	TD	Lng	PD	FF	FR	Yds	TD
2007	WAS	13	1	4	2	2	0.0	0	0	0	0	0	0	0	0	0	0
2008	WAS	15	0	17	11	6	2.0	3	0	0	0	0	2	0	0	0	0
2009	WAS	**16**	0	23	18	5	2.0	2	0	0	0	0	1	1	**1**	0	0
2010	WAS	**16**	12	57	32	**25**	1.5	3	0	0	0	0	2	2	**1**	0	0
2011	WAS	**16**	0	16	10	6	0.0	1	0	0	0	0	0	0	0	0	0
2012	WAS	**16**	0	46	34	12	2.5	3	0	0	0	0	0	0	**1**	**7**	0
2013	ARI	3	3	4	4	0	0.0	0	0	0	0	0	1	0	0	0	0
2014	ARI	**16**	0	13	11	2	1.0	1	0	0	0	0	0	0	0	0	0
2015	OAK	**16**	0	13	11	2	0.0	1	0	0	0	0	0	0	0	0	0
2016	BUF	**16**	**16**	**76**	56	20	**12.5**	10	1	**28**	0	**28**	6	**3**	0	0	0
2017	BUF	**16**	11	74	**59**	15	3.0	7	0	0	0	0	1	**3**	0	0	0
2018	BUF	**16**	8	74	55	19	6.5	**11**	**2**	9	0	8	**9**	2	**1**	0	0
2019	BUF	**16**	7	55	35	20	2.0	4	0	0	0	0	**9**	1	0	0	0
		191	58	472	338	134	33.0	46	3	37	0	28	31	12	4	7	0

=== Playoffs ===
Year	Team	Games		Tackles					Interceptions					Fumbles			
Year	Team	GP	GS	Cmb	Solo	Ast	Sck	TFL	Int	Yds	TD	Lng	PD	FF	FR	Yds	TD
2007	WAS	**1**	0	0	0	0	0.0	0	0	0	0	0	0	0	0	0	0
2012	WAS	**1**	0	3	1	2	0.0	0	0	0	0	0	0	0	0	0	0
2014	ARI	**1**	0	0	0	0	0.0	0	0	0	0	0	0	0	0	0	0
2017	BUF	**1**	**1**	**10**	**7**	**3**	**1.0**	**2**	0	0	0	0	0	0	0	0	0
2019	BUF	**1**	0	3	1	2	0.0	0	0	0	0	0	0	0	0	0	0
		5	1	16	9	7	1.0	2	0	0	0	0	0	0	0	0	0

== Career highlights ==
NFL

- 2× Pro Bowl selection (2012, 2016)
- Second-team All-Pro selection (2016)
- Pro Bowl Defensive MVP (2016)
- AFC Defensive Player of the Month (October 2016)
- Ranked No. 91 in the Top 100 Players of 2017

College

- Second-team All-Pac-10 (2004)

== Coaching career ==
On January 15, 2026, Alexander was hired as the assistant edges coach at his alma mater, California.

== Personal life ==
Alexander was raised by his mother and his maternal uncle. He is married and has two daughters and two sons. He has a family history of diabetes and thus is a spokesman for the American Diabetes Association.

Alexander is a Christian. He became a Christian shortly after the death of his teammate Sean Taylor. He said, “I was in the NFL making great money, living my dream, but in reality I had a hole in my heart and I was yearning for more. So with that tragedy really pushing me to something that I wasn’t quite sure what it was and the modeling of those men that I mentioned, my teammates, my brothers, I soon found out that that was Christ.”

When he joined the Redskins in 2006, Alexander gained the nickname "One Man Gang", due to the versatility of football positions he can play: offensive guard, tight end, linebacker, fullback, defensive tackle, defensive end, and special teams.

Alexander co-owns and runs a Pilates studio in Ashburn, Virginia, called The Studio M.B.S. (Mind, Body, Soul), with former Redskins teammate Kedric Golston.
