= 2004 Washington Redskins season =

NFL team season

- Owner: Daniel Snyder
- General manager: Vinny Cerrato
- President: Joe Gibbs
- Head coach: Joe Gibbs
- Home stadium: FedExField

Results
- Record: 6–10
- Division place: 4th NFC East
- Playoffs: Did not qualify
- All-Pros: CB Shawn Springs (2nd team)
- Pro Bowlers: LB Marcus Washington

The 2004 season was the Washington Redskins' 73rd in the National Football League (NFL). Although they improved on their 5–11 record from 2003 to 6–10, they finished bottom of their division and missed the playoffs for the fifth straight year. The season saw Joe Gibbs come out of retirement to return as head coach. The team acquired running back Clinton Portis in a trade that sent Champ Bailey to the Denver Broncos in the 2004 offseason. Week 8 marked the first time since 1932 that the U.S. presidential election went against the Redskins Rule.

== Offseason ==
=== Free agency ===
Player	Former team
Marcus Washington	Indianapolis Colts
Shawn Springs	Seattle Seahawks
Cornelius Griffin	New York Giants
Phillip Daniels	Chicago Bears

Player	New team
Lional Dalton	Kansas City Chiefs
Jeremiah Trotter	Philadelphia Eagles
Peppi Zellner	Arizona Cardinals
Regan Upshaw	New York Giants

=== Trades ===
March 4, 2004	To Washington Redskins Clinton Portis	To Denver Broncos Champ Bailey; 2nd Rd. Draft Pick (2004) (Tatum Bell)

=== Staff ===
2004 Washington Redskins staff
Front office: Owner – Daniel Snyder; Vice president of football operations – Joe Mendes; Vice president of football operations – Pepper Rodgers; Director of player personnel – Vinny Cerrato; Head coaches: Head coach – Joe Gibbs; Assistant head coach/offense – Joe Bugel; Assistant head coach/defense – Gregg Williams; Offensive coaches: Offensive coordinator – Don Breaux; Quarterbacks – Jack Burns; Running backs – Earnest Byner; Wide receivers – Stan Hixon; Tight ends – Rennie Simmons; Offensive consultant – Ernie Zampese; Offensive assistant – Bill Lazor; Quality control – Coy Gibbs	Defensive coaches: Defensive coordinator/defensive line – Greg Blache; Linebackers – Dale Lindsey; Secondary/corners – DeWayne Walker; Safeties/third downs – Steve Jackson; Special teams coaches: Special teams – Danny Smith; Quality control special teams/defensive assistant – Kirk Olivadotti; Strength and conditioning: Strength and conditioning – John Dunn; Assistant strength and conditioning – John Hastings; Assistant strength and conditioning – Bobby Crumpler

=== NFL draft ===
2004 Washington Redskins draft
Round	Pick	Player	Position	College	Notes
1	5	Sean Taylor *	S	Miami (FL)	
3	81	Chris Cooley *	TE	Utah State	
5	151	Mark Wilson	OT	California	
6	180	Jim Molinaro	OT	Notre Dame	
Made roster † Pro Football Hall of Fame * Made at least one Pro Bowl during career

=== Final roster ===
2004 Washington Redskins roster
Quarterbacks (QB): 8 Mark Brunell; 4 Tim Hasselbeck; 11 Patrick Ramsey; Running backs (RB): 46 Ladell Betts; 40 Rock Cartwright; 30 Dahrran Diedrick; 45 Mike Sellers FB; Wide receivers (WR): 86 Antonio Brown; 80 Laveranues Coles; 87 Rod Gardner; 84 Taylor Jacobs; 85 Darnerien McCants; 83 James Thrash; Tight ends (TE): 47 Chris Cooley; 48 Kori Dickerson; 82 Brian Kozlowski; 88 Robert Royal	Offensive linemen (OL): 67 Ray Brown LT; 66 Derrick Dockery G; 64 Lennie Friedman C; 69 Jim Molinaro RT; 78 Vaughn Parker RT; 52 Cory Raymer C; 60 Chris Samuels LT; 77 Randy Thomas G; 63 Mark Wilson G; Defensive linemen (DL): 73 Ryan Boschetti DE; 57 Chris Clemons DE; 92 Demetric Evans DE; 96 Cornelius Griffin DT; 99 Jermaine Haley DT; 91 Cedric Killings DT; 75 Brandon Noble DT; 95 Joe Salave'a DT; 94 Ron Warner DE; 97 Renaldo Wynn DE	Linebackers (LB): 51 Brandon Barnes MLB; 59 Devin Lemons OLB; 98 Lemar Marshall OLB; 58 Antonio Pierce MLB; 53 Marcus Washington OLB; Defensive backs (DB): 37 Rufus Brown CB; 25 Ryan Clark SS; 22 Pat Dennis FS; 29 Todd Franz SS; 27 Walt Harris CB; 21 Fred Smoot CB; 24 Shawn Springs CB; 36 Sean Taylor FS; 38 Garnell Wilds CB; Special teams (ST): 71 Ethan Albright LS; 5 Jeff Chandler K; 19 Tom Tupa P	Practice squad: -- Korey Banks CB; -- James Bethea CB; 72 Nic Clemons DE; 79 Pita Elisara T; -- Maurice Jones LB; 61 Ben Nowland C; 18 Gari Scott WR; 54 Clifton Smith LB; Reserve: 56 LaVar Arrington LB (IR); -- Micheal Barrow LB (IR); 41 Matt Bowen S (IR); 50 Khary Campbell LB (IR); 93 Phillip Daniels DE (IR); 35 Jason Doering S (IR); 10 John Hall K (IR); 76 Jon Jansen RT (IR); 23 Ade Jimoh CB (IR); 74 Kenyatta Jones LT (IR); 34 Andre Lott S (IR); 20 Chad Morton RS (IR); 26 Clinton Portis RB (IR); 31 John Simon RB (IR); 39 Dennard Wilson S (IR); Rookies in italics 53 active, 15 reserve, 8 practice squad

== Preseason ==
Week	Date	Opponent	Result	Record	Venue
1	August 9	Denver Broncos	W 20–17	1–0	FedExField
2	August 14	Carolina Panthers	L 20–23	1–1	FedExField
3	August 21	at Miami Dolphins	W 17–0	2–1	Pro Player Stadium
4	August 27	at St. Louis Rams	L 3–28	2–2	Edward Jones Dome
5	September 3	Atlanta Falcons	W 27–0	3–2	FedExField

== Regular season ==
Due to the addition of the Houston Texans in 2002 and a subsequent change to the NFL's scheduling formula, the 2004 season was the first time since 1991 that the Redskins played the Cincinnati Bengals; the Bengals won the game, the first time they had done so at the Redskins. It was also the first time the Redskins had hosted the Green Bay Packers since 1979.

=== Schedule ===
Week	Date	Opponent	Result	Record	Venue	Attendance
1	September 12	Tampa Bay Buccaneers	**W** 16–10	1–0	FedExField	90,098
2	September 19	at **New York Giants**	**L** 14–20	1–1	Giants Stadium	78,767
3	September 27	**Dallas Cowboys**	**L** 18–21	1–2	FedExField	90,367
4	October 3	at Cleveland Browns	**L** 13–17	1–3	Cleveland Browns Stadium	73,348
5	October 10	Baltimore Ravens	**L** 10–17	1–4	FedExField	90,287
6	October 17	at Chicago Bears	**W** 13–10	2–4	Soldier Field	61,985
7	Bye					
8	October 31	Green Bay Packers	**L** 14–28	2–5	FedExField	89,295
9	November 7	at Detroit Lions	**W** 17–10	3–5	Ford Field	62,657
10	November 14	Cincinnati Bengals	**L** 10–17	3–6	FedExField	87,786
11	November 21	at **Philadelphia Eagles**	**L** 6–28	3–7	Lincoln Financial Field	67,720
12	November 28	at Pittsburgh Steelers	**L** 7–16	3–8	Heinz Field	63,707
13	December 5	**New York Giants**	**W** 31–7	4–8	FedExField	87,872
14	December 12	**Philadelphia Eagles**	**L** 14–17	4–9	FedExField	90,089
15	December 18	at San Francisco 49ers	**W** 26–16	5–9	Monster Park	65,710
16	December 26	at **Dallas Cowboys**	**L** 10–13	5–10	Texas Stadium	63,705
17	January 2	Minnesota Vikings	**W** 21–18	6–10	FedExField	78,876
Note: Intra-divisional opponents are in **bold** text.

=== Game summaries ===
==== Week 2 ====
Team	1	2	3	4	Total
Redskins	7	0	0	7	14
• Giants	0	20	0	0	20

- Date: September 19
- Location: Giants Stadium
- Game start: 1:00 p.m. EST
- Elapsed time: 3:11
- Game attendance: 78,767
- Game weather: 62 °F (17 °C); wind 16 mph (26 km/h)
- Referee: Tom White
- TV announcers (Fox): Joe Buck, Troy Aikman, Cris Collinsworth, Pam Oliver

Scoring summary
Q1	7:24	WAS	Cooley 7-yard pass from Brunell (Hall kick)	WAS 7–0
Q2	12:53	NYG	Carter 38-yard pass from Warner (Christie kick)	Tied 7–7
Q2	6:21	NYG	Green 16-yard fumble return (Christie kick)	NYG 14–7
Q2	4:34	NYG	Christie 38-yard field goal	NYG 17–7
Q2	0:37	NYG	Christie 22-yard field goal	NYG 20–7
Q4	12:01	WAS	Portis 13-yard pass from Ramsey (Hall kick)	NYG 20–14

== Standings ==
NFC East
	W	L	T	PCT	DIV	CONF	PF	PA	STK
^{(1)} Philadelphia Eagles	13	3	0	.813	6–0	11–1	386	260	L2
New York Giants	6	10	0	.375	3–3	5–7	303	347	W1
Dallas Cowboys	6	10	0	.375	2–4	5–7	293	405	L1
Washington Redskins	6	10	0	.375	1–5	6–6	240	265	W1

NFC
#	Team	Division	W	L	T	PCT	DIV	CONF	SOS	SOV	STK
Division leaders
1	Philadelphia Eagles	East	13	3	0	.813	6–0	11–1	.453	.409	L2
2	Atlanta Falcons	South	11	5	0	.688	4–2	8–4	.420	.432	L2
3	Green Bay Packers	North	10	6	0	.625	5–1	9–3	.457	.419	W2
4	Seattle Seahawks	West	9	7	0	.563	3–3	8–4	.445	.368	W2
Wild cards
5 (Note: St. Louis clinched the NFC #5 seed instead of Minnesota or New Orleans based on better conference record (7–5 to Minnesota’s 5–7 to New Orleans’ 6–6).)	St. Louis Rams	West	8	8	0	.500	5–1	7–5	.488	.438	W2
6 (Note: Minnesota clinched the NFC #6 seed instead of New Orleans based on head-to-head victory.)	Minnesota Vikings	North	8	8	0	.500	3–3	5–7	.480	.406	L2
Did not qualify for the postseason
7	New Orleans Saints	South	8	8	0	.500	3–3	6–6	.465	.427	W4
8	Carolina Panthers	South	7	9	0	.438	3–3	6–6	.496	.366	L1
9 (Note: Detroit finished ahead of Arizona and New York Giants based upon head-to-head record (2–0 versus Arizona’s 1–1 and New York Giants’ 0–2). Division tiebreak was initially used to eliminate Dallas and Washington.)	Detroit Lions	North	6	10	0	.375	2–4	5–7	.496	.417	L2
10	Arizona Cardinals	West	6	10	0	.375	2–4	5–7	.461	.417	W1
11 (Note: New York Giants finished ahead of Dallas and Washington in the NFC East based on better head-to-head record (3–1 to Dallas‘ 2–2 to Washington’s 1–3).)	New York Giants	East	6	10	0	.375	3–3	5–7	.516	.417	W1
12 (Note: Dallas finished ahead of Washington in the NFC East based on head-to-head sweep.)	Dallas Cowboys	East	6	10	0	.375	2–4	5–7	.516	.375	L1
13	Washington Redskins	East	6	10	0	.375	1–5	6–6	.477	.333	W1
14 (Note: Tampa Bay finished ahead of Chicago based upon head-to-head victory.)	Tampa Bay Buccaneers	South	5	11	0	.313	2–4	4–8	.477	.413	L4
15	Chicago Bears	North	5	11	0	.313	2–4	4–8	.465	.388	L4
16	San Francisco 49ers	West	2	14	0	.125	2–4	2–10	.488	.375	L3
Tiebreakers (Note: When breaking ties for three or more teams under the NFL's rules, they are first broken within divisions, then comparing only the highest-ranked remaining team from each division.)
