= Shawn Springs =

American football player (born 1975)

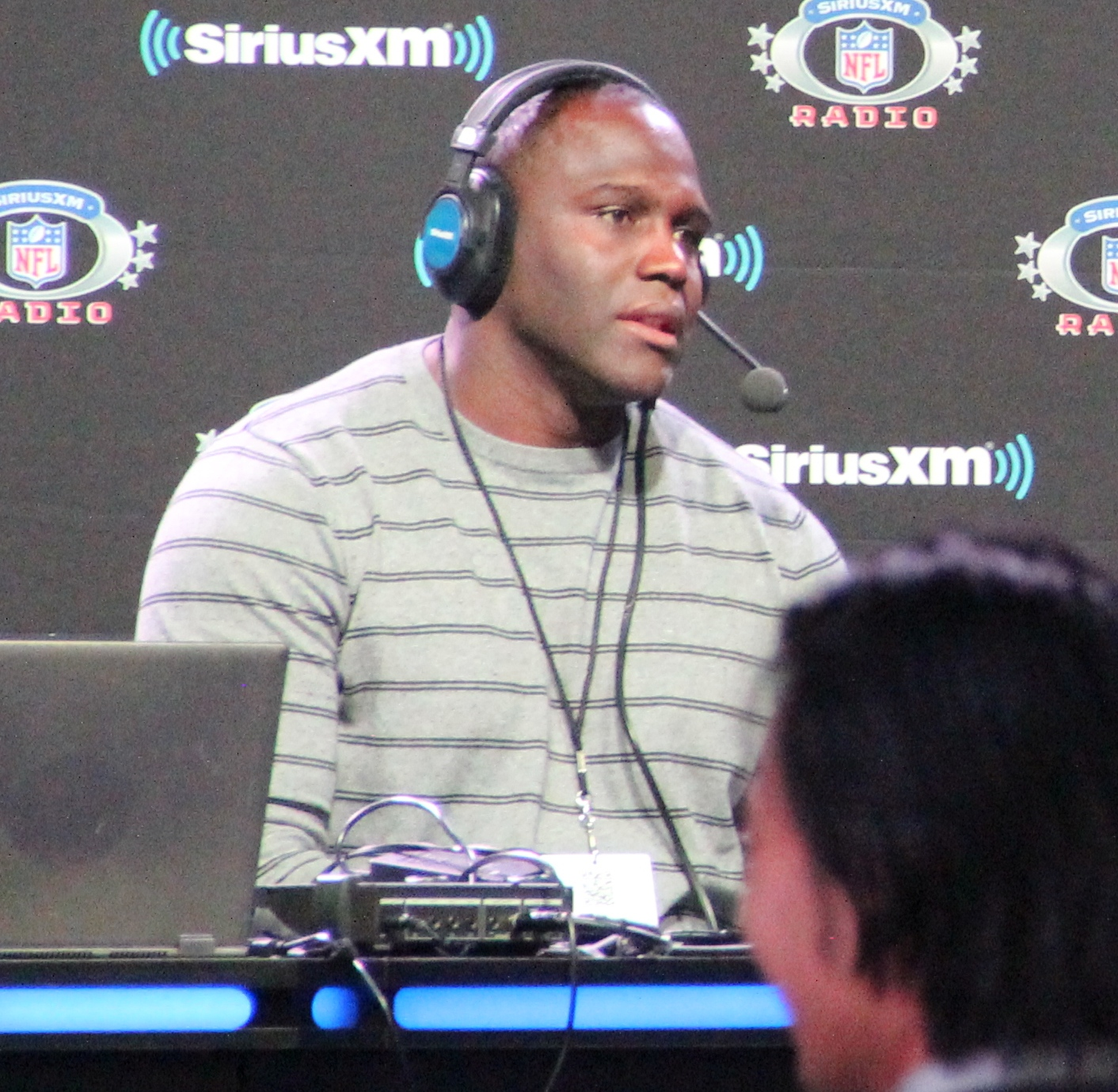
- Springs in 2019

No. 24, 29
- Position: Cornerback

Personal information
- Born: March 11, 1975 (age 51); Williamsburg, Virginia, U.S.
- Listed height: 6 ft 0 in (1.83 m)
- Listed weight: 204 lb (93 kg)

Career information
- High school: Springbrook (Silver Spring, Maryland)
- College: Ohio State (1994–1996)
- NFL draft: 1997: 1st round, 3rd overall pick

Career history
- Seattle Seahawks (1997–2003); Washington Redskins (2004–2008); New England Patriots (2009)

Awards and highlights
- Second-team All-Pro (2004); Pro Bowl (1998); PFWA All-Rookie Team (1997); Seattle Seahawks 35th Anniversary Team; Consensus All-American (1996); Second-team All-American (1995); Big Ten Co-Defensive Player of the Year (1996); 2× First-team All-Big Ten (1995, 1996)

Career NFL statistics
- Tackles: 723
- Sacks: 8.5
- Forced fumbles: 6
- Fumble recoveries: 6
- Passes defended: 111
- Interceptions: 33
- Defensive touchdowns: 4
- Stats at Pro Football Reference

Shawn Springs (born March 11, 1975) is an American former professional football player who was a cornerback in the National Football League (NFL) for 13 seasons. He played college football for the Ohio State Buckeyes, earning All-American honors. He was selected by the Seattle Seahawks third overall in the 1997 NFL draft, and played for the Seahawks, Washington Redskins and New England Patriots, and was a Pro Bowl selection in 1998.

== Early life ==
Springs was born in Williamsburg, Virginia, and largely raised in Silver Spring, Maryland. He is the son of NFL player, Ron Springs, who was a running back at Ohio State University and subsequently played for Tampa Bay and the Dallas Cowboys. Shawn was an all-state selection in high school football at Springbrook High School where he played running back and cornerback.

== Professional career ==
Pre-draft measurables
Height	Weight	Arm length	Hand span	Bench press
5 ft 11 7/8 in (1.83 m)	197 lb (89 kg)	31 5/8 in (0.80 m)	9 5/8 in (0.24 m)	17 reps
All values from NFL Combine

=== Seattle Seahawks ===
The Seattle Seahawks selected Springs third overall in the 1997 NFL draft. The Seahawks decided to secure their ability to draft Springs by trading their first (11th overall), second (41st overall), third (70th overall), and fourth round (100th overall) in the 1997 NFL Draft to the Atlanta Falcons in return for their first (3rd overall) and third round (63rd overall) picks.

He became the highest pick used to select a cornerback in the history of the NFL draft. Jeff Okudah tied his record when he was selected third overall in the 2020 NFL draft. In 2025, Travis Hunter was selected 2nd overall as a cornerback/wide receiver.

He started 10 games in his rookie season, recording one interception. Springs was selected to the 1999 Pro Bowl in his second season in the NFL, after starting all sixteen games, and recorded 76 tackles, seven interceptions, and two defensive touchdowns. He started every game of his next two seasons in Seattle, recording five interceptions in the 1999 season and two in the 2000 season.

=== Washington Redskins ===
Springs was signed as a free agent on March 4, 2004, by the Washington Redskins. In his first season in Washington, he led the team in interceptions with five, and sacks with six, and was the first cornerback to lead his team in sacks and interceptions in NFL history. In the 2005 season, Springs played much of the season with a leg injury; he finished the year with one interception and recorded 50 tackles in 15 starts. The 2006 season saw Springs on the bench for most of the year, battling nagging injuries while the Redskins compiled a 5–11 season. He was eventually placed on injured reserve on December 26 with a fractured scapula. Springs ended the 2007 season with 62 tackles and four interceptions, the latter in the last four regular-season games, as he helped the Redskins make the playoffs.

Springs was released by the Redskins on February 27, 2009.

=== New England Patriots ===
Springs signed a three-year contract with the New England Patriots on March 11, 2009. He started four of the first eight games of the 2009 season for the Patriots. In November, he missed a four-game stretch with a knee injury, despite being listed as probable on each week's injury report. After back-to-back losses, he returned to start the final four games of the season and the Patriots' playoff loss to the Baltimore Ravens. He finished the season with one interception, 40 tackles, and four passes defended.

On May 18, 2010, the Patriots released Springs.

== NFL career statistics ==
Year	Team	GP	Tackles				Fumbles			Interceptions					
Year	Team	GP	Cmb	Solo	Ast	Sck	FF	FR	Yds	Int	Yds	Avg	Lng	TD	PD
1997	SEA	10	38	34	4	0.0	1	0	0	1	0	0	0	0	6
1998	SEA	16	75	60	15	0.0	1	1	0	7	142	20	56	2	21
1999	SEA	16	73	63	10	0.0	0	1	0	5	77	15	42	0	15
2000	SEA	16	84	71	13	0.0	1	0	0	2	8	4	8	0	14
2001	SEA	8	20	16	4	0.0	0	1	0	1	0	0	0	0	4
2002	SEA	15	59	54	5	0.0	0	1	0	3	0	0	0	0	12
2003	SEA	12	43	37	6	1.5	0	0	0	1	8	8	8	0	11
2004	WAS	15	64	52	12	6.0	1	0	0	5	117	23	38	0	12
2005	WAS	15	50	47	3	0.0	0	0	0	1	2	2	2	0	9
2006	WAS	9	38	35	3	0.0	0	0	0	1	4	4	4	0	8
2007	WAS	16	62	57	5	0.0	1	1	0	4	63	16	53	0	15
2008	WAS	9	36	31	5	1.0	0	0	0	1	0	0	0	0	7
2009	NE	12	40	35	5	0.0	0	0	0	1	8	8	8	0	4
Career		169	682	592	90	8.5	5	5	0	33	429	13	56	2	138

== Personal life ==
Springs is the son of former NFL running back Ron Springs. He has four children, Skyler, Samari, Shawn II, and Sedona.
