= Kedric Golston =

American football player and coach (born 1983)

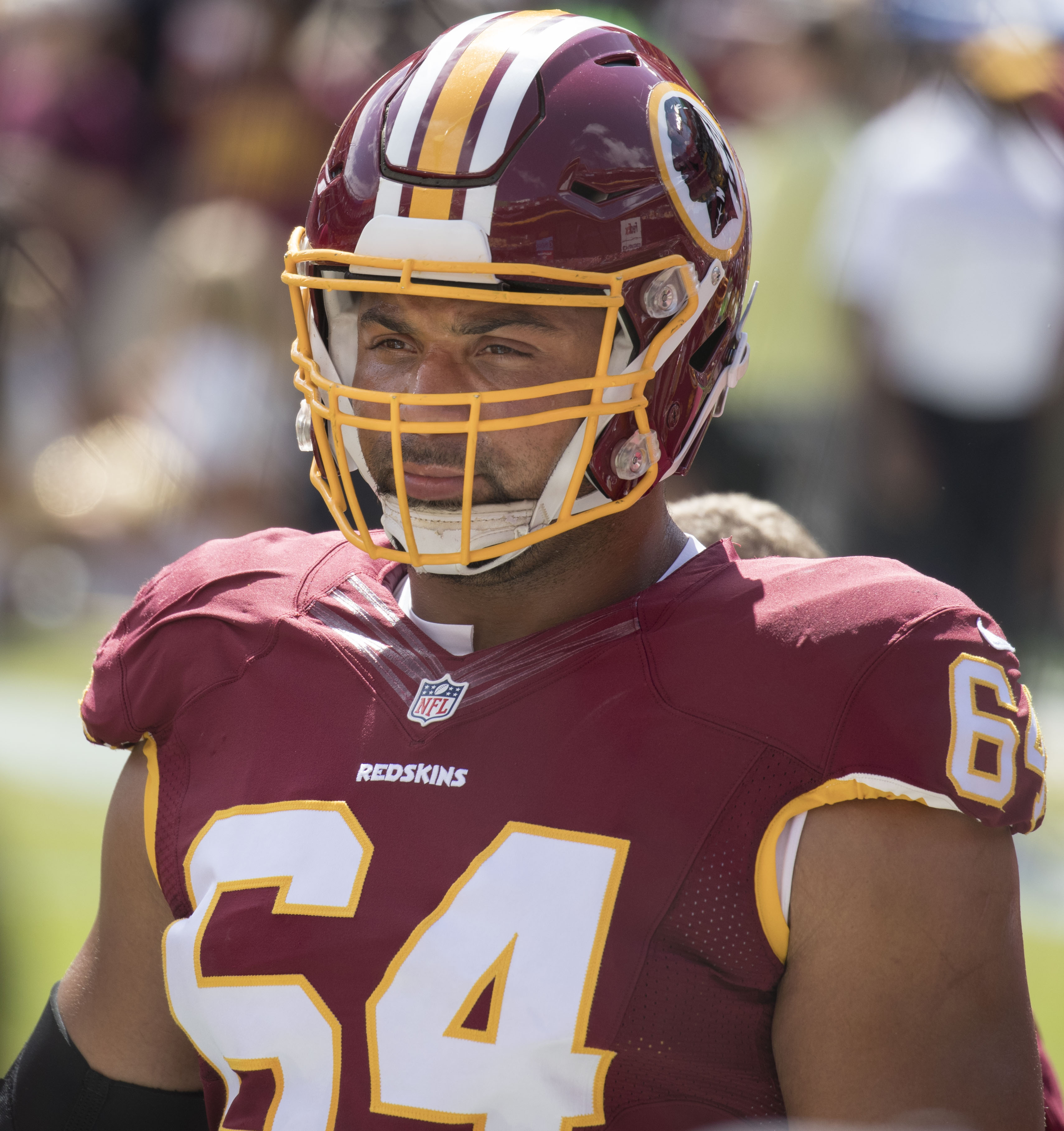
- Golston with the Washington Redskins in 2016

No. 64
- Position: Defensive tackle

Personal information
- Born: May 30, 1983 (age 43); Tyrone, Georgia, U.S.
- Listed height: 6 ft 4 in (1.93 m)
- Listed weight: 330 lb (150 kg)

Career information
- High school: Sandy Creek (Tyrone)
- College: Georgia (2002–2005)
- NFL draft: 2006: 6th round, 196th overall pick

Career history

Playing
- Washington Redskins (2006–2016)

Coaching
- Gonzaga College HS (2023) Assistant coach; Stone Bridge HS (2024–present) Head coach

Career NFL statistics
- Total tackles: 224
- Sacks: 7.0
- Forced fumbles: 2
- Fumble recoveries: 2
- Pass deflections: 7
- Stats at Pro Football Reference

Kedric Golston (born May 30, 1983) is an American former professional football player who was a defensive tackle for 11 seasons with the Washington Redskins of the National Football League (NFL). He played college football for the Georgia Bulldogs and was selected by the Redskins in the sixth round of the 2006 NFL draft. Golston has been the head football coach of Stone Bridge High School since 2024.

== Early life ==
Golston attended and played high school football at Sandy Creek High School. While there, he was honored as a Parade Magazine All-American and Georgia Sports Writers Association All-State. He was the Fayette County Player of the Year as a junior and senior, and was a three-time All-County pick. As a junior, Golston registered 88 tackles and 13 sacks. He recorded 55 tackles and 11 sacks in six games as a senior. He is the all-time sack leader (45) at Sandy Creek. Golston lettered twice in basketball and finished second in the state in wrestling his junior year.

In September 2001, Golston was in an automobile accident and was thrown from his car. He sustained a broken right femur, had his lungs fill with fluid, spent two weeks in intensive care, and had to go through lengthy rehabilitation.

In 2001, Golston was inducted into the Sandy Creek High School Hall of Fame.

== College career ==
Golston played college football for the University of Georgia. In 2002, he became the first true freshman to start the season opener on the Bulldogs' defensive line since 1994. He was named Freshman All-America third-team and Freshman All-SEC first-team by The Sporting News. Golston played in all 14 games, starting three, and recorded 34 tackles (ten individual) with 2.5 stops for losses and a forced fumble. During that season, the team won Georgia's first SEC Championship in 20 years, defeated Florida State University to win the 2003 Sugar Bowl and set a school record for most victories in a season (13). After the season ended he had a steel rod removed from his leg, which had been inserted after the car accident in 2001. During the surgery, the doctors also found a calcium deposit nearly four inches long in his hip and removed it. During his sophomore season, Golston suffered a broken shoulder blade during practice and was limited to eight games. As a junior, he was the recipient of the Coaches Leadership Award for defense, and earned All-SEC honorable mention. He posted 23 tackles (12 individual) with 2.5 stops for losses while starting every game. Golston played in ten games as a senior, with nine starts after being hindered by an elbow injury. He recorded 21 tackles (13 individual), 1.5 sacks, and 28 quarterback pressures, which ranked second on the team.

In 44 games with the Bulldogs, Golston started 30 times. He collected 95 tackles (43 individual) with 3.5 sacks for minus-20 yards and 8.5 stops for losses of 36 yards. He recovered three fumbles and deflected a pass. Golston graduated with a degree in child and family development.

=== Off-the-field Issues ===
In April 2003, Golston was one of nine Georgia football players declared ineligible by the National Collegiate Athletic Association (NCAA) for selling their 2002 SEC Championship Game rings. The school appealed the NCAA's ruling. The university, which worked to recover the rings, did not say how much money the players received for the rings. The players were required to make restitution for the money they received from the sale of their rings.

On April 10, 2005, Golston and Georgia teammate Derrick White were arrested for disorderly conduct, stemming from their roles in a bar fight at the Classic City Saloon in Athens, Georgia. Golston also was charged with simple battery of a police officer and obstruction of a law enforcement officer. According to an incident report, officers tried to contain White when Golston approached them and insisted they let him go. Golston was released on $9,000 bond and all the charges involved were misdemeanors. Golston received a one-game suspension and White received a two-game suspension.

== Professional career ==
Pre-draft measurables
Height	Weight	Arm length	Hand span	40-yard dash	10-yard split	20-yard split	20-yard shuttle	Three-cone drill	Vertical jump	Broad jump	Bench press
6 ft 4 in (1.93 m)	300 lb (136 kg)	32 3/8 in (0.82 m)	10 1/8 in (0.26 m)	4.90 s	1.68 s	2.90 s	4.45 s	7.60 s	33.0 in (0.84 m)	9 ft 3 in (2.82 m)	31 reps
All values from NFL Combine

=== Washington Redskins ===
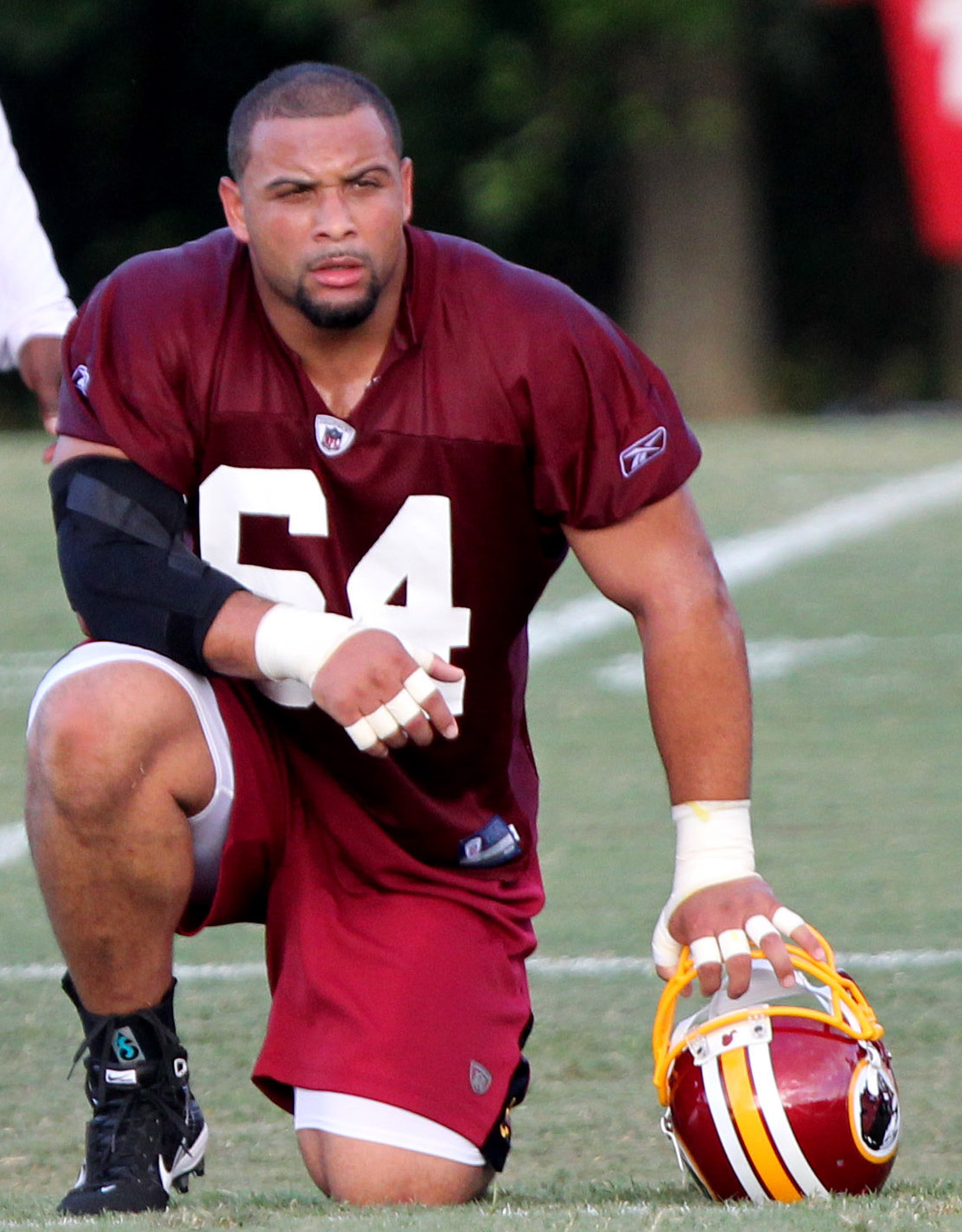
Golston at training camp in 2011

Golston was selected by the Washington Redskins in the sixth round (196th overall pick) of the 2006 NFL draft. As a rookie, he played in all 16 regular season games with 13 starts. On September 24, 2006, he made his first professional start against the Houston Texans and recorded three tackles (one individual) and his first career fumble recovery.

In the 2007 season, Golston played in 15 regular season games and one postseason game. He finished with 18 tackles (13 individual) and one sack. He recorded his first career sack against the New York Giants on September 23, 2007. On October 21, 2007, Golston blocked an extra point against the Arizona Cardinals, the first extra point blocked by the Redskins since Wilber Marshall against the San Francisco 49ers on November 20, 1988. He blocked a field goal against the Chicago Bears on December 6, 2007, which was the first field goal blocked by the Redskins since Troy Vincent did it against the Dallas Cowboys on November 5, 2006.

The following year, Golston played in 13 regular season games and started 12 games. He was inactive for three games with an injured ankle. He ended the season with 37 tackles (22 individual) and two sacks. He returned healthy in 2009 after signing a one-year tender worth $1.54 million and played in all 16 regular season games, starting six games. Golston recorded 50 tackles (25 individual), six tackles for loss, two sacks, and recorded his first career forced fumble.

After the Redskins switched to a 3–4 defense in the 2010 season, Golston converted from a defensive tackle to a defensive end. By the end of the season, he started 13 games and recorded 35 tackles and one pass deflection. On December 26, 2010, he was put on injured reserve.

On August 3, 2011, Golston re-signed with the Redskins. Golston was made the backup defensive end behind Adam Carriker for the season. In Week 10 against the Miami Dolphins, Golston was injured and was taken out of the game. On November 15, 2011, Golston was officially placed on injured reserve suffering a third-degree MCL tear and a partially torn ACL.

On April 9, 2012, Golston again re-signed with the Redskins. During the preseason, Golston claimed he was fully healed from his injuries from the previous season. Golston re-signed with the Redskins on a three-year deal on March 12, 2013.

The Redskins re-signed Golston to a one-year contract on March 9, 2016. With the prior season's starting nose tackle, Terrance Knighton, leaving the team via free agency, Golston became the Redskins' starting nose tackle. On September 19, 2016, Golston was placed on injured reserve with a hamstring injury.

== NFL career statistics ==
Legend
**Bold**	Career high

=== Regular season ===
Year	Team	Games		Tackles					Interceptions					Fumble			
Year	Team	GP	GS	Cmb	Solo	Ast	Sck	TFL	Int	Yds	TD	Lng	PD	FF	FR	Yds	TD
2006	WAS	**16**	**13**	**44**	**34**	10	0.5	3	0	0	0	0	**3**	0	**1**	0	0
2007	WAS	15	0	12	8	4	1.0	1	0	0	0	0	0	0	**1**	0	0
2008	WAS	13	12	28	19	9	**2.0**	**4**	0	0	0	0	1	0	0	0	0
2009	WAS	**16**	5	33	21	12	**2.0**	**4**	0	0	0	0	2	**1**	0	0	0
2010	WAS	13	**13**	35	20	**15**	0.0	0	0	0	0	0	1	0	0	0	0
2011	WAS	9	0	16	8	8	1.5	3	0	0	0	0	0	**1**	0	0	0
2012	WAS	**16**	0	16	8	8	0.0	3	0	0	0	0	0	0	0	0	0
2013	WAS	**16**	8	21	10	11	0.0	1	0	0	0	0	0	0	0	0	0
2014	WAS	11	0	7	7	0	0.0	0	0	0	0	0	0	0	0	0	0
2015	WAS	15	0	10	0	10	0.0	2	0	0	0	0	0	0	0	0	0
2016	WAS	2	2	2	2	0	0.0	0	0	0	0	0	0	0	0	0	0
		142	53	224	137	87	7.0	21	0	0	0	0	7	2	2	0	0

=== Playoffs ===
Year	Team	Games		Tackles					Interceptions					Fumbles			
Year	Team	GP	GS	Cmb	Solo	Ast	Sck	TFL	Int	Yds	TD	Lng	PD	FF	FR	Yds	TD
2007	WAS	**1**	0	**3**	**3**	0	0.0	0	0	0	0	0	0	0	0	0	0
2012	WAS	**1**	0	2	0	**2**	0.0	0	0	0	0	0	0	0	0	0	0
2015	WAS	**1**	0	0	0	0	0.0	0	0	0	0	0	0	0	0	0	0
		3	0	5	3	2	0.0	0	0	0	0	0	0	0	0	0	0

== Coaching career ==
Golston was a defensive staff intern for the Virginia Tech Hokies in 2021. He worked as an assistant coach at Gonzaga College High School in 2023 and was named head coach at Stone Bridge High School in 2024.

== Personal life ==
When he was in first grade, Golston's mother was murdered in a robbery. He moved from his home in South Carolina to live with his father and stepmother outside Atlanta, Georgia after his maternal grandparents declined to take him in. Golston and his wife, Christal, have three children, Tori, Kaden, and Kedric II. Tori has become successful child model who has appeared in Macy's billboards in Times Square and in advertisements for Target, Toys "R" Us, and Linens 'n Things. Golston is a Christian.

Golston participated in the NFL's business management and entrepreneurial programs at the Harvard Business School and Wharton School of the University of Pennsylvania, which prepared players for their post-season playing careers. He and his wife now own and run their own real estate company based out of Ashburn, Virginia. Golston also co-owns and runs a Pilates studio in Ashburn, along with former Redskins teammate, Lorenzo Alexander.
