= Marcus Washington =

American football player (born 1977)

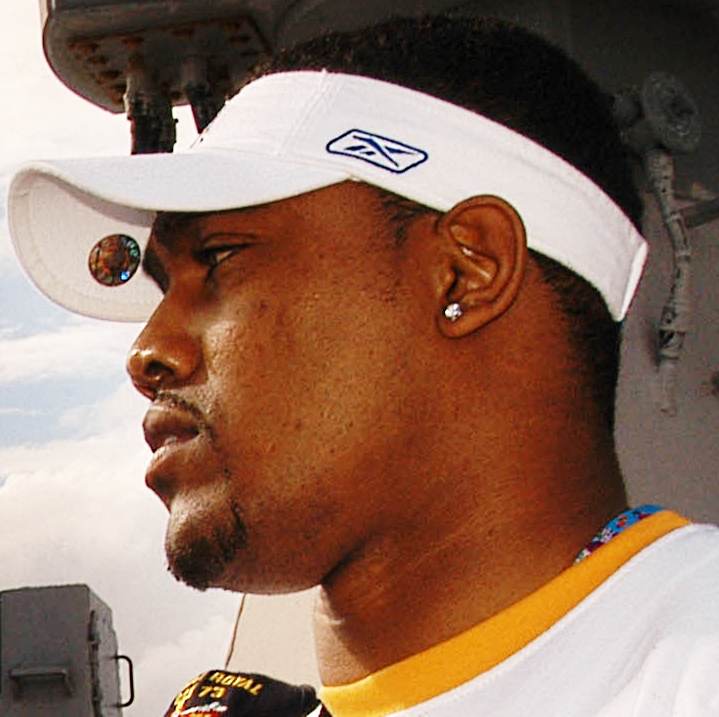
- Washington in 2005

No. 53
- Position: Linebacker

Personal information
- Born: October 17, 1977 (age 49); Auburn, Alabama, U.S.
- Listed height: 6 ft 3 in (1.91 m)
- Listed weight: 244 lb (111 kg)

Career information
- High school: Auburn
- College: Auburn
- NFL draft: 2000: 2nd round, 59th overall pick

Career history
- Indianapolis Colts (2000–2003); Washington Redskins (2004–2008)

Awards and highlights
- Pro Bowl (2004)

Career NFL statistics
- Total tackles: 617
- Sacks: 37.5
- Forced fumbles: 16
- Pass deflections: 27
- Interceptions: 3
- Defensive touchdowns: 1
- Stats at Pro Football Reference

Marcus Cornelius Washington (born October 17, 1977) is an American former professional football player who was a linebacker in the National Football League (NFL). He played college football for the Auburn Tigers and was selected by the Indianapolis Colts in the second round of the 2000 NFL draft. He was later signed by the Washington Redskins in 2004, and played there for five seasons.

== Early life ==
Washington attended Auburn High School in Auburn, Alabama, where he lettered in both basketball and football.

== College career ==
As a senior at Auburn University, Washington played defensive end and posted seven sacks and 52 tackles.

== Professional career ==
Pre-draft measurables
Height	Weight	Arm length	Hand span	40-yard dash	10-yard split	20-yard split	20-yard shuttle	Vertical jump
6 ft 3 1/4 in (1.91 m)	252 lb (114 kg)	32 in (0.81 m)	9 in (0.23 m)	4.70 s	1.72 s	2.74 s	4.49 s	35.0 in (0.89 m)

=== Indianapolis Colts ===
He was selected by the Indianapolis Colts with the 28th pick in the second round (59th overall) of the 2000 NFL draft. After four seasons as a linebacker with the Colts, they were unable to make him an offer because of the expected cost of re-signing Peyton Manning.

=== Washington Redskins ===
The Washington Redskins signed Washington on March 5, 2004. During his five-year tenure with the Redskins he made the Pro Bowl in 2004 and was named an alternate in 2005 and 2006.

Washington was released by the Redskins on February 20, 2009.

=== Coaching ===
He was the defensive line coach for the University of San Diego football team in 2016. In that season, the Toreros ranked the #1 ranked scoring defense in the Football Championship Subdivision (FCS), averaging only 12.1 points allowed per game in the regular season.

=== NFL statistics ===
Year	Team	Games	Combined tackles	Tackles	Assisted tackles	Sacks	Forced fumbles	Fumble recoveries	Fumble return yards	Interceptions	Interception return yards	Yards per interception return	Longest interception return	Interceptions returned for touchdown	Passes defended
2000	IND	16	12	6	6	2.0	0	0	0	1	1	1	1	0	1
2001	IND	16	93	73	20	8.0	2	0	0	0	0	0	0	0	2
2002	IND	15	65	46	19	2.0	1	1	0	1	40	40	40	1	3
2003	IND	16	81	55	26	6.0	3	1	0	0	0	0	0	0	4
2004	WSH	16	107	87	20	4.5	1	1	0	0	0	0	0	0	2
2005	WSH	16	93	73	20	7.5	3	2	0	1	41	41	41	0	7
2006	WSH	14	88	59	29	2.5	2	2	0	0	0	0	0	0	10
2007	WSH	12	48	32	16	5.0	1	0	0	0	0	0	0	0	0
2008	WSH	10	44	25	19	0.0	3	0	0	0	0	0	0	0	1
Career		131	631	456	175	37.5	16	7	0	3	82	27	41	1	30

== Sources ==
- Bryant, Howard (January 1, 2006). "Washington Is Monumental". The Washington Post. p. E1.
