= Chris Horton =

American football player and coach (born 1984)

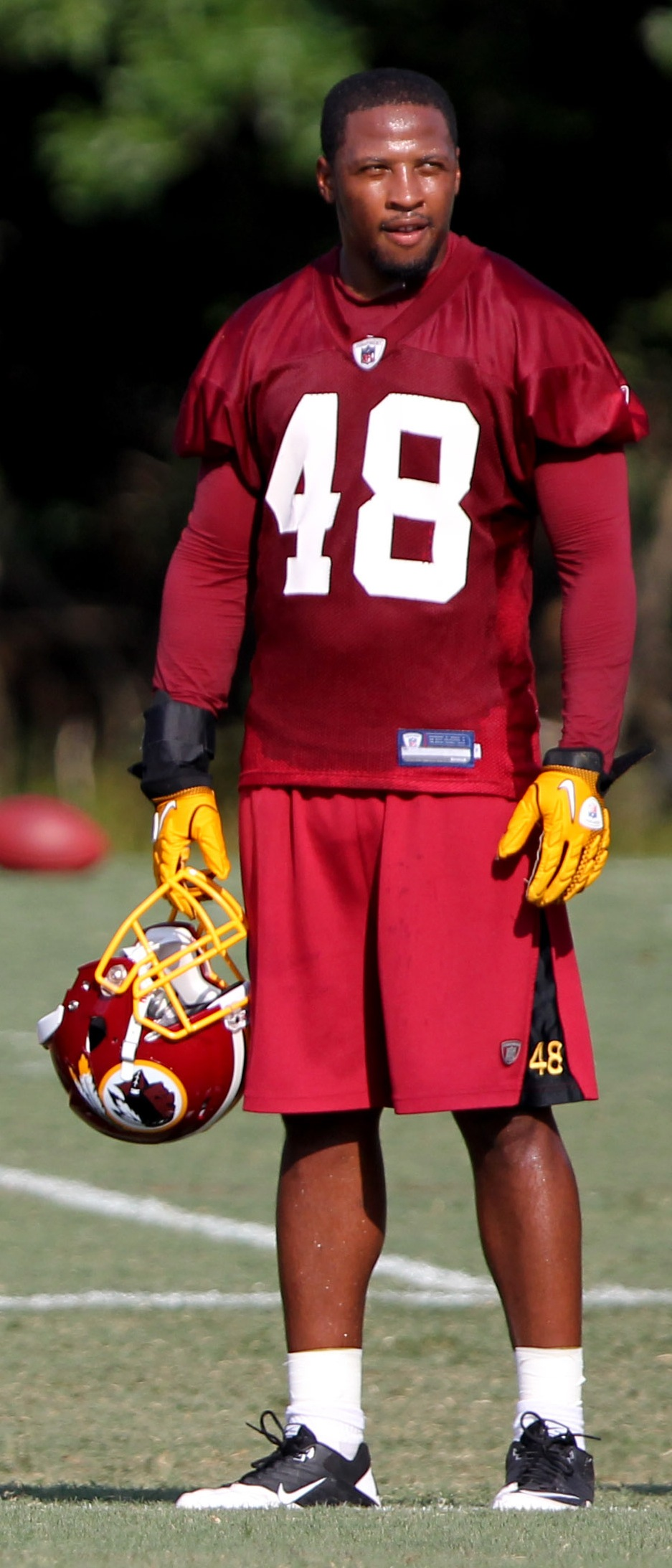
- Horton at Redskins training camp in 2011

New York Giants
- Title: Assistant head coach, Special teams coordinator

Personal information
- Born: December 29, 1984 (age 41); Los Angeles, California, U.S.
- Listed height: 6 ft 0 in (1.83 m)
- Listed weight: 212 lb (96 kg)

Career information
- Position: Safety (No. 48)
- High school: De La Salle (New Orleans, Louisiana)
- College: UCLA (2003-2007)
- NFL draft: 2008: 7th round, 249th overall pick

Career history

Playing
- Washington Redskins (2008–2010); New York Giants (2012)*
- * Offseason or practice squad member only

Coaching
- UCLA (2012–2013) Quality control assistant; Baltimore Ravens (2014–2025); Coaching intern – defense (2014); Staff assistant – special teams (2015); Assistant special teams coach (2016–2018); Special teams coordinator (2019–2025); New York Giants (2026–present) Assistant head coach & special teams coordinator

Awards and highlights
- PFWA All-Rookie Team (2008); First-team All-American (2007); First-team All-Pac-10 (2007); Second-team All-Pac-10 (2006)

Career NFL statistics
- Games played: 29
- Total tackles: 122
- Sacks: 1
- Forced fumbles: 1
- Fumble recoveries: 2
- Interceptions: 3
- Stats at Pro Football Reference

Christopher Dion Horton (born December 29, 1984) is an American football coach and former player who is the special teams coordinator for the New York Giants of the National Football League (NFL). He played as a safety in the NFL for the Washington Redskins (now Commanders). Horton played college football for the UCLA Bruins, earning first-team All-American honors in 2007. He was selected by Washington in the seventh round of the 2008 NFL draft.

== Early life ==
He graduated in 2003 from De La Salle High School in New Orleans where he was a teammate of Marquise Hill.

== Professional playing career ==
Pre-draft measurables
| Height | Weight | Arm length | Hand span | 40-yard dash | 10-yard split | 20-yard split | 20-yard shuttle | Three-cone drill | Vertical jump | Broad jump | Bench press |
|---|---|---|---|---|---|---|---|---|---|---|---|
| 6 ft 0 1/8 in (1.83 m) | 212 lb (96 kg) | 30 7/8 in (0.78 m) | 9 1/4 in (0.23 m) | 4.54 s | 1.56 s | 2.63 s | 4.35 s | 7.34 s | 32.0 in (0.81 m) | 9 ft 11 in (3.02 m) | 14 reps |
All values from NFL Combine/Pro Day

=== Washington Redskins ===
Horton was drafted by the Washington Redskins in the seventh round (249th overall) of the 2008 NFL draft. He officially signed a three-year, $1.191 million contract with the team on June 12, 2008. The contract included a $36,000 signing bonus.

Making his first NFL start for the Redskins in Week 2 against the New Orleans Saints, Horton recovered a fumble and recorded two interceptions helping lead the team to a comeback victory. He was named NFC Defensive Player of the Week for his efforts against the Saints. In the week 4 game against the Dallas Cowboys, he recorded his third interception of the season. On October 2, he was named NFL Defensive Rookie of the Month. For week 4 he was named Diet Pepsi NFL Rookie of the Week. As a rookie, he finished third among rookies in interceptions behind the Tampa Bay Buccaneers Aqib Talib and Arizona Cardinals Dominique Rodgers-Cromartie.

Following the 2008 season, he was awarded $342,197 in additional pay from the NFL's performance-based pay system, which gives financial compensation based on a comparison of playing time to salary; this made him the third biggest beneficiary in 2008.

Horton was released by the Redskins on September 3, 2011, just before the start of the 2011 season.

=== New York Giants ===
Horton signed with the New York Giants on March 15, 2012. He was released by the Giants on August 27.

== Professional coaching career ==
=== Baltimore Ravens ===
Horton originally joined the Baltimore Ravens as part of their coaching internship program. In 2015, the Ravens officially hired him as an assistant special teams coach.

On March 15, 2019, it was announced Horton would be promoted to special teams coordinator after Jerry Rosburg announced his retirement from coaching.

=== New York Giants ===
On January 25, 2026, the New York Giants hired Horton to serve as the team's assistant head coach and special teams coordinator rejoining John Harbaugh, who became their new head coach earlier in the month.
