= Cornelius Griffin =

American football player (born 1976)

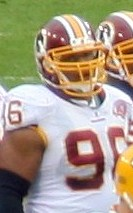
- Griffin with the Washington Redskins in 2007

No. 97, 96
- Position: Defensive tackle

Personal information
- Born: December 3, 1976 (age 49); Troy, Alabama, U.S.
- Listed height: 6 ft 4 in (1.93 m)
- Listed weight: 303 lb (137 kg)

Career information
- High school: Brundidge (AL) Pike Co.
- College: Alabama
- NFL draft: 2000: 2nd round, 42nd overall pick

Career history
- New York Giants (2000–2003); Washington Redskins (2004–2009)

Awards and highlights
- First-team All-SEC (1999)

Career NFL statistics
- Total tackles: 461
- Sacks: 29.0
- Forced fumbles: 4
- Fumble recoveries: 5
- Interceptions: 2
- Stats at Pro Football Reference

Cornelius Griffin (/kɔːrˈnɛliəs/; born December 3, 1976) is an American former professional football player who was a defensive tackle in the National Football League (NFL). He was selected by the New York Giants in the second round of the 2000 NFL draft. He played college football at Pearl River Community College and Alabama.

Griffin also played for the Washington Redskins.

== Early life and college career ==
Griffin was born in Troy, Alabama. His father Willie Griffin was a pastor of the Lily White Pentecostal Church in Brundidge, Alabama, and Cornelius was one of Willie and Martha Griffin's seven children. Willie died in a car accident in 1998. Griffin graduated from Pike County High School in 1995 in Brundidge, Alabama. He first played college football as a defensive tackle for Pearl River Community College in Mississippi. Although he committed to Auburn, Griffin decided to sign with the University of Alabama after Auburn coaches wanted him to become a tight end. In the Alabama Crimson Tide, he started 23 of 25 games in its team (including bowls). As a senior in 1999, he was part of the Super Sleeper Team and All-Southeastern Conference first-team.

== Professional career ==
=== 2000 NFL draft ===
Griffin was selected in the second round of the 2000 NFL draft by the New York Giants. "His workouts were unbelievable. We saw him as a certain first-rounder", said Giants General Manager Ernie Accorsi.

Pre-draft measurables
| Height | Weight | Arm length | Hand span | 40-yard dash | 10-yard split | 20-yard split | 20-yard shuttle | Three-cone drill | Vertical jump | Broad jump | Bench press |
|---|---|---|---|---|---|---|---|---|---|---|---|
| 6 ft 3 1/8 in (1.91 m) | 297 lb (135 kg) | 33 in (0.84 m) | 10 in (0.25 m) | 4.85 s | 1.70 s | 2.81 s | 4.62 s | 7.63 s | 31 in (0.79 m) | 9 ft 3 in (2.82 m) | 30 reps |
All values from NFL Combine

=== New York Giants ===
Griffin played for four seasons with the Giants. He was a starter in Super Bowl XXXV and recorded 1.5 sacks in the game.

=== Washington Redskins ===
Griffin was signed by the Giants' NFC East-rival Washington Redskins as an unrestricted free agent on March 3, 2004, during the 2004 offseason.

Griffin had his best season in 2004, recording 96 tackles (66 solo) and six sacks. He compiled 29 sacks with 461 tackles (340 solo) as a defensive tackle during his career.

He was released on March 4, 2010.

=== After the NFL ===
Griffin purchased a share of Flowers Insurance Company in Troy, Alabama. The name has now been changed to Griffin-Wilkes Insurance. Griffin also coaches has coached at Pike Liberal Arts High School in Troy, Alabama. Although he currently coaches for the Pike County High School Bulldogs in Brundidge, Alabama which is also his hometown and hometown high school.

=== NFL statistics ===
| Year | Team | Games | Combined tackles | Tackles | Assisted tackles | Sacks | Forced fumbles | Fumble recoveries |
|---|---|---|---|---|---|---|---|---|
| 2000 | NYG | 15 | 34 | 27 | 7 | 5.0 | 0 | 0 |
| 2001 | NYG | 16 | 63 | 47 | 16 | 2.5 | 0 | 1 |
| 2002 | NYG | 14 | 49 | 32 | 17 | 4.0 | 1 | 1 |
| 2003 | NYG | 15 | 55 | 39 | 17 | 1.0 | 0 | 1 |
| 2004 | WSH | 15 | 70 | 56 | 14 | 6.0 | 0 | 1 |
| 2005 | WSH | 13 | 35 | 34 | 1 | 4.0 | 1 | 1 |
| 2006 | WSH | 14 | 50 | 39 | 11 | 1.0 | 1 | 0 |
| 2007 | WSH | 16 | 43 | 28 | 14 | 2.5 | 0 | 0 |
| 2008 | WSH | 14 | 28 | 16 | 12 | 1.0 | 0 | 0 |
| 2009 | WSH | 14 | 34 | 22 | 12 | 2.0 | 1 | 0 |
| Career | | 146 | 461 | 340 | 121 | 29.0 | 4 | 5 |
