= Chris Meidt =

American football player and coach (born 1969)

Biographical details
- Born: June 1, 1969 (age 57)

Playing career
- c. 1990: Bethel (MN)
- Position: Quarterback

Coaching career (HC unless noted)
- 1993–1994: Becker HS (MN) (assistant)
- 1995–2001: Bethel (MN) (OC)
- 2002–2007: St. Olaf
- 2008–2009: Washington Redskins (off. asst.)

Head coaching record
- Overall: 40–20

Chris Meidt (born June 1, 1969) is an American football coach and former player. He served as the head football coach at St. Olaf College, an NCAA Division III school in Northfield, Minnesota, for six seasons, from 2002 to 2007, compiling a record of 40–20. Meidt was an offensive assistant coach for the Washington Redskins in 2008 and 2009 under Jim Zorn.

Chris Meidt held the Minnesota high school record for most passing yards in his high school career with 8533 yards from 1984 to 1987. The record has since been surpassed three times according to the Minnesota State Football Coaches Association records.

== Head coaching record ==
| Year | Team | Overall | Conference | Standing | Bowl/playoffs |
|---|---|---|---|---|---|
St. Olaf Oles (Minnesota Intercollegiate Athletic Conference) (2002–2007)
| 2002 | St. Olaf | 5–5 | 3–5 | 6th | |
| 2003 | St. Olaf | 4–6 | 3–5 | T–6th | |
| 2004 | St. Olaf | 7–3 | 5–3 | T–4th | |
| 2005 | St. Olaf | 8–2 | 6–2 | 3rd | |
| 2006 | St. Olaf | 8–2 | 6–2 | 3rd | |
| 2007 | St. Olaf | 8–2 | 6–2 | 3rd | |
| St. Olaf: | | 40–21 | 29–19 | | |
| Total: | | 40–20 | | | |
