= Greg Blache =

American football coach (born 1949)

Personal information
- Born: March 9, 1949 (age 77); New Orleans, Louisiana, U.S.

Career information
- College: Notre Dame

Career history
- Notre Dame (1972–1975) Offensive line coach; Tulane (1976–1977) Offensive line coach; Tulane (1978–1979) Linebackers coach; Tulane (1980) Secondary coach; Notre Dame (1981) Running backs coach; Notre Dame (1982–1983) Defensive line coach; Jacksonville Bulls (1984–1985) Defensive line coach; Southern (1986) Defensive coordinator; Kansas (1987) Defensive line coach; Green Bay Packers (1988–1993) Defensive line coach; Indianapolis Colts (1994–1998) Defensive line coach; Chicago Bears (1999–2003) Defensive coordinator; Washington Redskins (2004–2007) Defensive line coach; Washington Redskins (2008–2009) Defensive coordinator
- Coaching profile at Pro Football Reference

Greg Blache (born March 9, 1949) is an American former professional football coach, most recently the defensive coordinator of the Washington Redskins. He served as Defensive Coordinator-Defensive Line 2004 through 2007 for the Redskins, followed by two seasons as the Defensive Coordinator under former coach Jim Zorn. He served as the Chicago Bears' defensive coordinator for five years prior to joining the Redskins.

== Biography ==
On January 26, 2008, Blache was named defensive coordinator of the Redskins. He had spent the previous four seasons coaching the Redskins' defensive line unit.

Blache used to be defensive coordinator for the Chicago Bears. During his tenure, Blache's defenses forced 138 turnovers, including 37 in 2001, the most by a Bears defense since 1990, and accounted for 13 touchdowns (two in 1999, four in 2000, five in 2001, one in 2002, and one in 2003). Blache has since retired.
