= Anthony Montgomery (American football) =

American football player (born 1984)

No. 94
- Position: Defensive tackle

Personal information
- Born: March 8, 1984 (age 42); Cleveland, Ohio, U.S.
- Listed height: 6 ft 6 in (1.98 m)
- Listed weight: 330 lb (150 kg)

Career information
- High school: Kennedy (Cleveland)
- College: Minnesota
- NFL draft: 2006: 5th round, 153rd overall pick

Career history
- Washington Redskins (2006–2009); Hartford Colonials (2010)*
- * Offseason or practice squad member only

Awards and highlights
- Second-team All-Big Ten (2005)

Career NFL statistics
- Total tackles: 78
- Sacks: 3
- Fumble recoveries: 2
- Stats at Pro Football Reference

Anthony Montgomery (born March 8, 1984) is an American former professional football player who was a defensive tackle in the National Football League (NFL). He played college football for the Minnesota Golden Gophers and was selected by the Washington Redskins in the fifth round of the 2006 NFL draft with the 153rd overall pick.

== Health care fraud case ==
Montgomery was charged with one count of conspiracy to commit wire fraud and health care fraud, one count of wire fraud, and one count of health care fraud by the United States Department of Justice on July 24, 2020. He pleaded guilty by December 2020. By February 2022, he had been sentenced to 180 days of house arrest and ordered to perform 240 hours of community service.
