= Ryan Boschetti =

American football player (born 1981)

No. 73, 91, 90
- Position: Defensive end

Personal information
- Born: October 7, 1981 (age 45); Belmont, California, U.S.
- Listed height: 6 ft 4 in (1.93 m)
- Listed weight: 310 lb (141 kg)

Career information
- College: UCLA
- NFL draft: 2004: undrafted

Career history
- Washington Redskins (2004–2008); Oakland Raiders (2009)*; New York Sentinels (2009); Oakland Raiders (2010)*; Hartford Colonials (2010)*; Las Vegas Locomotives (2010–2012)
- * Offseason or practice squad member only

Awards and highlights
- UFL champion (2010)

Career NFL statistics
- Total tackles: 19
- Stats at Pro Football Reference

Ryan S. Boschetti (born October 7, 1981) is an American former professional football player who was a defensive end in the National Football League (NFL). He played college football for the UCLA Bruins and was signed by the Washington Redskins as an undrafted free agent in 2004.

Boschetti was also a member of the New York Sentinels, Oakland Raiders, and Las Vegas Locomotives.

== Early life ==
Boschetti attended Carlmont High School where he lettered three years in football and was named first-team all-league, all-county and all-state as a defensive lineman. He recorded 21 career quarterback sacks. He served as captain in football, basketball, and baseball. He also earned two track letters. He was named Carlmont's Athlete of the Year in football, basketball and baseball as a senior in 1999.

== College career ==
=== San Mateo ===
Boschetti played two seasons, 2000 and 2001, of junior college football at College of San Mateo. He was rated No. 2 junior college player in the nation by JCFootball.com and was credited with 24 quarterback sacks during his two seasons at San Mateo. He was also two-time all-league and all-state selection.

=== UCLA ===
As a junior at the University of California, Los Angeles, he recorded 23 tackles on the season to rank fourth among Bruins defensive lineman. He played in all 13 games as a senior in 2003 and finished the season eighth in tackles for the Bruins with 43 tackles, 2.5 sacks, 8 tackles for loss, and a blocked kick.

== Professional career ==
=== Washington Redskins ===
In 2004, Boschetti spent training camp with the Redskins but was released prior to the start of the regular season. He was immediately signed to the team's practice squad. On November 26, he was signed to the active roster and played in three games, recording five tackles. In 2005, he played in 13 games with 5 tackles.

He was released by the Redskins on August 30, 2008, and re-signed on November 25 after the team released running back Shaun Alexander.

=== Oakland Raiders ===
Boschetti signed with the Oakland Raiders on April 2, 2009. He was released on September 5.

Boschetti signed a contract with the Oakland Raiders on May 17, 2010. He was released on July 29
