= 2005 Washington Redskins season =

NFL team season

- Owner: Daniel Snyder
- General manager: Vinny Cerrato
- President: Joe Gibbs
- Head coach: Joe Gibbs
- Home stadium: FedExField

Results
- Record: 10–6
- Division place: 2nd NFC East
- Playoffs: Won Wild Card Playoffs (at Buccaneers) 17–10; Lost Divisional Playoffs (at Seahawks) 10–20
- All-Pros: WR Santana Moss (2nd team); OT Jon Jansen (2nd team)
- Pro Bowlers: OT Chris Samuels; WR Santana Moss

The 2005 season was the Washington Redskins' 74th in the National Football League and the second season under head coach Joe Gibbs. The team flipped around their 6–10 record from 2004 and finished 10–6. The Redskins placed 2nd in the NFC East. Washington earned their first playoff berth since 1999. In their return to the postseason, the Redskins defeated the Tampa Bay Buccaneers in the opening round, but a loss to the Seattle Seahawks the following week ended their season. The Seahawks went on to become NFC Champions.

This was the last season Washington won a playoff game under the Redskins name, as well as the final playoff win under Snyder. The franchise would not win in the postseason again until 2024, which, coincidentally, was also over Tampa Bay, and by which time the team had changed its name.

== Offseason ==
The Redskins started the offseason by adding a new quarterbacks coach, Bill Musgrave. Musgrave was the former offensive coordinator for the Jacksonville Jaguars and had worked with quarterback Mark Brunell before. Musgrave added the shotgun formation to Washington's playbook.

During the offseason, the Redskins lost cornerback Fred Smoot and starting linebacker Antonio Pierce to free agency.

The Redskins signed the following free agents: center Casey Rabach, wide receiver David Patten, and strong safety Pierson Prioleau.

The Redskins restructured the contract of Pro Bowl left tackle Chris Samuels, with the "seven-year deal is worth roughly $47 million and includes the richest signing bonus in franchise history."

The Redskins also traded wide receiver Laveranues Coles to the New York Jets for wide receiver Santana Moss. Most sports writers thought that this was a lopsided deal and that the Redskins were getting the worse end of the trade.

In the 2005 NFL draft, the Redskins drafted Auburn cornerback Carlos Rogers with the ninth pick. Later in the 1st round, they traded their third round pick in the 2005 draft and their first and fourth round picks in the 2006 draft to the Denver Broncos for the 25th overall pick. With the 25th overall pick, the Redskins selected Auburn quarterback Jason Campbell. The Redskins used their remaining picks to draft UCLA fullback Manuel White, Louisville linebacker Robert McCune, Stanford linebacker Jared Newberry, and Citadel fullback Nehemiah Broughton.

The Redskins finished the 2005 preseason with a record of 1–3, losing to the Carolina Panthers 28–10, losing to the Cincinnati Bengals 24–17, defeating the Pittsburgh Steelers 17–10, and losing to the Baltimore Ravens 26–20.

== Staff ==
2005 Washington Redskins staff
Front office: Owner – Daniel Snyder; Vice president of football operations – Joe Mendes; Vice president of football operations – Pepper Rodgers; Director of player personnel – Vinny Cerrato; Head coaches: Head coach – Joe Gibbs; Assistant head coach-defense – Gregg Williams; Assistant to the head coach – Mike Rutenberg; Offensive coaches: Offensive coordinator – Don Breaux; Quarterbacks – Bill Musgrave; Running backs – Earnest Byner; Wide receivers – Stan Hixon; Tight ends – Rennie Simmons; Offensive line – Joe Bugel; Offensive assistant – Jack Burns; Offensive assistant – Bill Lazor; Offensive quality control – Coy Gibbs	Defensive coaches: Linebackers – Dale Lindsey; Secondary – DeWayne Walker; Safeties – Steve Jackson; Special teams coaches: Special teams coordinator – Danny Smith; Assistant special teams/defensive quality control – Kirk Olivadotti; Strength and conditioning: Head strength and conditioning – John Hastings; Strength and conditioning – John Dunn; Strength and conditioning – Bobby Crumpler

=== NFL draft ===
2005 Washington Redskins draft
Round	Pick	Player	Position	College	Notes
1	9	Carlos Rogers *	CB	Auburn	
1	25	Jason Campbell	QB	Auburn	From Denver
4	120	Manuel White	FB	UCLA	From Minnesota
5	154	Robert McCune	LB	Louisville	
6	183	Jared Newberry	LB	Stanford	
7	222	Nehemiah Broughton	FB	The Citadel	
Made roster † Pro Football Hall of Fame * Made at least one Pro Bowl during career

== Roster ==
2005 Washington Redskins roster
Quarterbacks (QB): 8 Mark Brunell; 17 Jason Campbell; 11 Patrick Ramsey; Running backs (RB): 46 Ladell Betts; 30 Nehemiah Broughton FB; 31 Rock Cartwright; 26 Clinton Portis; 45 Mike Sellers FB; Wide receivers (WR): 82 Antonio Brown; 86 Jimmy Farris; 84 Taylor Jacobs; 89 Santana Moss; 83 James Thrash; Tight ends (TE): 47 Chris Cooley; 85 Brian Kozlowski; 88 Robert Royal	Offensive linemen (OL): 67 Ray Brown G; 66 Derrick Dockery G; 76 Jon Jansen OT; 69 Jim Molinaro OT; 68 Ikechuku Ndukwe G; 61 Casey Rabach C; 52 Cory Raymer C; 60 Chris Samuels OT; Defensive linemen (DL): 73 Ryan Boschetti DT; 90 Nic Clemons DE; 93 Phillip Daniels DE; 92 Demetric Evans DE; 96 Cornelius Griffin DT; 94 Aki Jones DT; 91 Cedric Killings DT; 95 Joe Salave'a DT; 97 Renaldo Wynn DE	Linebackers (LB): 56 LaVar Arrington OLB; 50 Khary Campbell MLB; 57 Warrick Holdman OLB; 98 Lemar Marshall MLB; 59 Robert McCune OLB; 53 Marcus Washington OLB; Defensive backs (DB): 41 Matt Bowen S; 25 Ryan Clark SS; 27 Walt Harris CB; 32 Ade Jimoh CB; 35 Christian Morton CB; 34 Dimitri Patterson CB; 20 Pierson Prioleau S; 22 Carlos Rogers CB; 24 Shawn Springs CB; 23 Omar Stoutmire S; 21 Sean Taylor FS; Special teams (ST): 71 Ethan Albright LS; 4 Derrick Frost P; 10 John Hall K	Practice squad: 78 Jon Alston OT; 29 Curry Burns S; -- Dwight Ellick CB; 12 Steven Harris WR; 74 Jim Jones G; -- Nick McNeil OLB; -- Calen Powell TE; 16 Richard Smith WR; Reserve: 58 Chris Clemons OLB (IR); 87 Robert Johnson TE (IR); 75 Brandon Noble DT (IR); 80 David Patten WR (IR); 77 Randy Thomas G (IR); 19 Tom Tupa P (IR); 48 Manuel White FB (IR); 72 Melvin Williams DE (IR); Rookies in italics 53 active, 8 reserve, 8 practice squad

== Preseason ==
Week	Date	Opponent	Result	Record	Venue	Recap
1	August 13	at Carolina Panthers	L 10–28	0–1	Bank of America Stadium	Recap
2	August 19	Cincinnati Bengals	L 17–24	0–2	FedExField	Recap
3	August 26	Pittsburgh Steelers	W 17–10	1–2	FedExField	Recap
4	September 1	at Baltimore Ravens	L 20–26	1–3	M&T Bank Stadium	Recap

== Regular season ==
=== Schedule ===
Week	Date	Opponent	Result	Record	Venue	Recap
1	September 11	Chicago Bears	W 9–7	1–0	FedExField	Recap
2	September 19	at Dallas Cowboys	W 14–13	2–0	Texas Stadium	Recap
3	Bye					
4	October 2	Seattle Seahawks	W 20–17 (OT)	3–0	FedExField	Recap
5	October 9	at Denver Broncos	L 19–21	3–1	Invesco Field	Recap
6	October 16	at Kansas City Chiefs	L 21–28	3–2	Arrowhead Stadium	Recap
7	October 23	San Francisco 49ers	W 52–17	4–2	FedExField	Recap
8	October 30	at New York Giants	L 0–36	4–3	Giants Stadium	Recap
9	November 6	Philadelphia Eagles	W 17–10	5–3	FedExField	Recap
10	November 13	at Tampa Bay Buccaneers	L 35–36	5–4	Raymond James Stadium	Recap
11	November 20	Oakland Raiders	L 13–16	5–5	FedExField	Recap
12	November 27	San Diego Chargers	L 17–23 (OT)	5–6	FedExField	Recap
13	December 4	at St. Louis Rams	W 24–9	6–6	Edward Jones Dome	Recap
14	December 11	at Arizona Cardinals	W 17–13	7–6	Sun Devil Stadium	Recap
15	December 18	Dallas Cowboys	W 35–7	8–6	FedExField	Recap
16	December 24	New York Giants	W 35–20	9–6	FedExField	Recap
17	January 1	at Philadelphia Eagles	W 31–20	10–6	Lincoln Financial Field	Recap

=== Standings ===
NFC East
	W	L	T	PCT	DIV	CONF	PF	PA	STK
^{(4)} New York Giants	11	5	0	.688	4–2	8–4	422	314	W1
^{(6)} Washington Redskins	10	6	0	.625	5–1	10–2	359	293	W5
Dallas Cowboys	9	7	0	.563	3–3	7–5	325	308	L1
Philadelphia Eagles	6	10	0	.375	0–6	3–9	310	388	L2

== Regular season recap ==
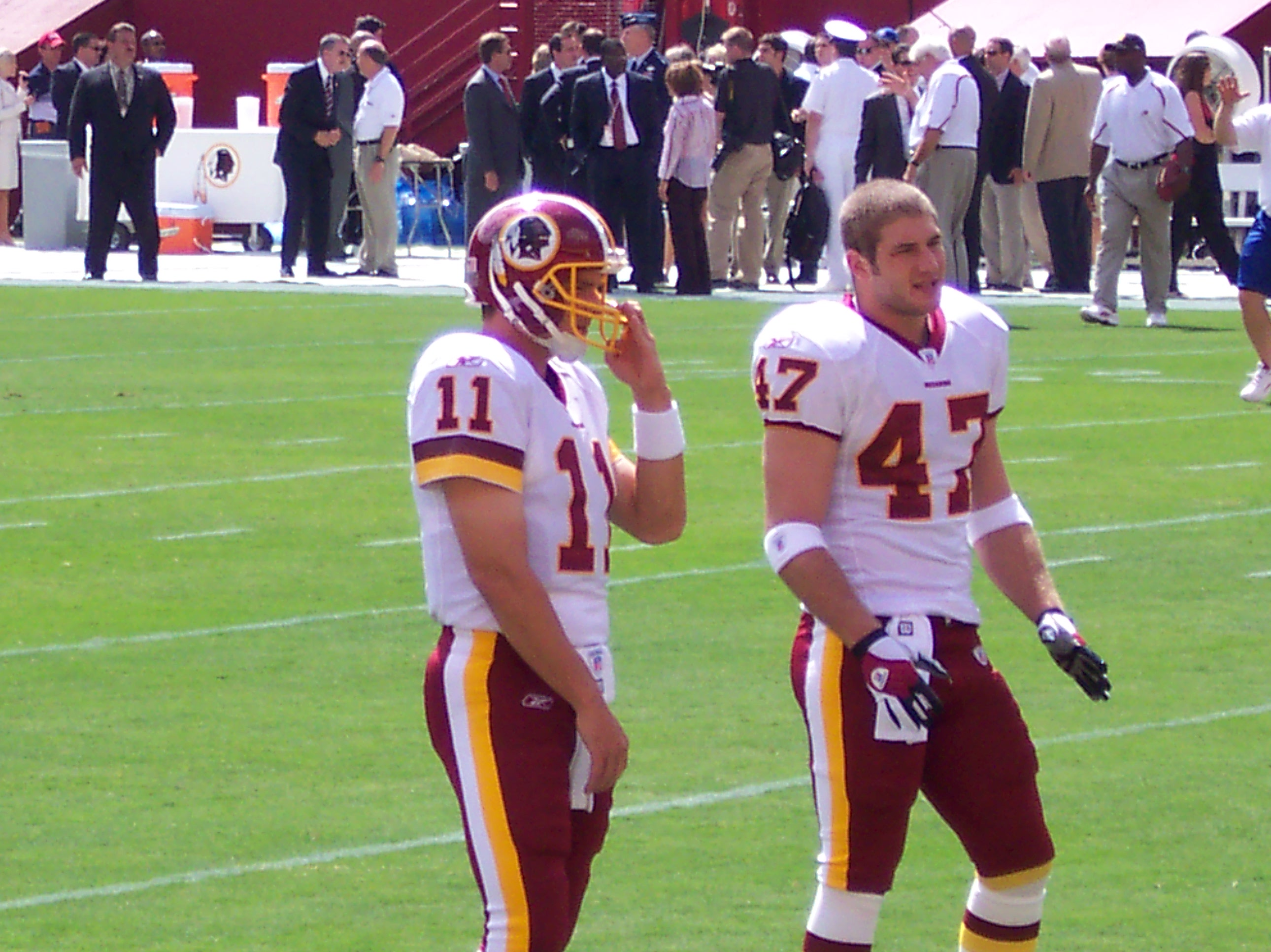
Patrick Ramsey and Chris Cooley, week 1

=== Week 1: vs. Chicago Bears ===
Team	1	2	3	4	Total
Bears	0	0	7	0	7
• Redskins	0	6	3	0	9

- Date: September 11
- Location: FedExField • Landover, Maryland
- Game start: 1:00 p.m. EST
- Game weather: 73 °F (22.8 °C), wind 6 miles per hour (9.7 km/h; 5.2 kn)
- Referee: Terry McAulay
- TV announcers (Fox): Dick Stockton, Daryl Johnston and Tony Siragusa

Scoring summary
2	WSH	John Hall 40-yard field goal	Redskins 3–0
2	WSH	John Hall 43-yard field goal	Redskins 6–0
3	CHI	Thomas Jones 1-yard run (Doug Brien kick)	Bears 7–6
3	WSH	John Hall 19-yard field goal	Redskins 9–7

The Redskins started the regular season against the Chicago Bears at home on September 11. The Redskins defense allowed only 41 rushing yards and 125 passing yards. The only score they allowed was a 1-yard Thomas Jones run. On one crucial drive for the Bears, when they needed a field goal to win, the Redskins forced three false starts and a sack to make it third-and-38. The Bears couldn't convert and the Redskins went on to win their first game in the 2005 season. Stats

=== Week 2: at Dallas Cowboys ===
	1	2	3	4	Total
Redskins	0	0	0	14	14
Cowboys	0	3	7	3	13

at Texas Stadium, Dallas, Texas

The Redskins traveled to Texas Stadium in Irving, Texas to take on one of their NFC East rivals, the Dallas Cowboys, in a Monday Night match-up. The Redskins trailed the entire game up until 3:46 left in the game. Dallas kicker Jose Cortez completed a 33-yard field goal in the second quarter. In the third quarter, quarterback Drew Bledsoe threw a 70-yard pass to Terry Glenn on a flea flicker. With 5:58 left to go in the game, Cortez completed another field goal of 41-yards. It looked as there was not a single hope left for Washington. On a fourth-and-15 play, Mark Brunell threw a 39-yard touchdown pass to Santana Moss with 3:46 to go. Moss got behind Dallas defensive back Roy Williams and streaked to the post to make the catch in the endzone. A 5-yard offside penalty on Dallas during Washington's extra point attempt allowed Washington to kick off from their own 35. But kicker Nick Novak was still unable to put it in the endzone, allowing Dallas return man Tyson Thompson to return the kick nearly to midfield. Novak atoned for the short kick by making the touchdown-saving tackle. After allowing one first down, the Washington defense held—thanks in part to Dallas' decision to abandon the run game while trying to run out the clock. Bledsoe threw numerous incompletions, stopping the clock and letting Washington conserve their timeouts. On top of that, Flozell Adams committed a key holding penalty which negated a first-down catch by Keyshawn Johnson on 3rd-and-8. On 4th-and-5, Dallas punter Mat McBriar fielded a low snap and punted it into the endzone for a touchback, giving Washington the ball at their 20-yard line with 2:52 remaining. Following a 10-yard completion to Clinton Portis, Brunell connected with Moss again, who caught it in stride—again behind Roy Williams—and raced into the endzone. The Cowboys made one final push to win the game, but the Redskins stopped them on fourth down to complete what is known as the "Monday Night Miracle". With the win, the Redskins moved to 2–0. Stats

=== Week 4: vs. Seattle Seahawks ===
	1	2	3	4	OT	Total
Seahawks	3	0	7	7	0	17
Redskins	0	7	10	0	3	20

at FedExField, Landover, Maryland

The Washington Redskins defeated the Seattle Seahawks by the score of 20–17. The Seahawks led early but the Redskins came back to lead by 7. With 1:23 left, Matt Hasselbeck threw a 6-yard touchdown pass to Darrell Jackson to tie the game. The Redskins won the coin toss and elected to receive the ball. They converted three third downs to get to Seattle's 22-yard line. Nick Novak kicked a 39-yard field goal to win the game for Washington. The Redskins were 3–0 for the first time since the 1991 Regular Season which led them to their latest Super Bowl victory to date.Stats

=== Week 5: at Denver Broncos ===
	1	2	3	4	Total
Redskins	7	3	0	9	19
Broncos	7	7	7	0	21

at Invesco Field, Denver, Colorado

Despite having 447 net yards, the Redskins were defeated by the Broncos, 21–19. Down 21–10 in the fourth quarter, the Redskins made a push to tie the game. Nick Novak kicked a field goal from 36 yards with 6:27 left. Washington got the ball back and drove down the field. On second-and-5, Mark Brunell passed to Chris Cooley for a touchdown. The Redskins tried for the 2-point conversion but fail. Denver recovered the onside kick and win the game. With their first loss of the season, the Redskins dropped to 3–1. Stats

=== Week 6: at Kansas City Chiefs ===
	1	2	3	4	Total
Redskins	0	7	14	0	21
Chiefs	3	3	15	7	28

The game was close at the half with the Redskins leading 7–6. Their lead soon disappeared as the Chiefs took a 14–7 lead on a 6-yard touchdown run by Priest Holmes. After Mark Brunell was sacked for a 9-yard loss, Santana Moss tied the game on a quick pass to the left flat as he ran 78-yards for a touchdown. The Chiefs retook a 21–14 lead on a Sammy Knight fumble recovery for an 80-yard touchdown along with a successful two-point conversion. In the final seconds of the third quarter, Brunell hit Chris Cooley with an 11-yard touchdown catch to tie the game once again at 21–21. Trent Green hit Holmes on a 60-yard touchdown catch to seal the deal for the Chiefs as Brunell and the Redskins failed in an attempted comeback in the final seconds of the fourth quarter. With the loss, the Redskins dropped to 3–2.

=== Week 7: vs San Francisco 49ers ===
	1	2	3	4	Total
49ers	7	0	0	10	17
Redskins	14	21	10	7	52

After two close, consecutive, and heartbreaking AFC losses in the last two weeks, the Redskins returned home to welcome the lowly 49ers to town and unleashed a scoring barrage, winning 52–17. After failing to score on their opening drive in each of their first five games, Washington scored first on a 6-play, 61-yard drive that ended with a 2-yard touchdown pass from Mark Brunell to Mike Sellers. After forcing another San Francisco punt, the Redskins drove another 60 yards for another score, this time a 5-yard run from Clinton Portis. After two more touchdown passes by Brunell, one each to Sellers and Santana Moss, combined with two more 1-yard touchdown runs by Portis and a Nick Novak field goal, the Redskins led 45–7 after three quarters. Washington finished their blowout with a 4-yard touchdown run by Rock Cartwright to make it 52–7. San Francisco did score twice on a 72-yard run by Frank Gore and a 47-yard field goal by Joe Nedney. With the win, Washington jumped up to 4–2.

=== Week 8: at New York Giants ===
	1	2	3	4	Total
Redskins	0	0	0	0	0
Giants	6	13	17	0	36

Following their lopsided blowout win over the 49ers, the Redskins headed to the Meadowlands for an NFC East duel with the New York Giants. Looking to follow up with another impressive win, the afternoon turned out to be a miserable one for the Redskins, getting shut out 36–0. The Giants, playing with heavy hearts after the death of owner Wellington Mara, got off to a fast start with a 57-yard run on the game's first play, leading to a Jay Feely field goal. Tiki Barber finished with 206 rushing yards on 24 carries. The 36–0 shutout dropped the Redskins to 4–3.

=== Week 9: vs Philadelphia Eagles ===
	1	2	3	4	Total
Eagles	7	0	3	0	10
Redskins	0	10	7	0	17

Looking to rebound from a 36–0 shutout against the Giants, Washington returned home for a second consecutive NFC East matchup, this time against the Philadelphia Eagles. Earlier in the week, Eagles WR Terrell Owens was suspended for conduct detrimental to the team. During the game, Philadelphia drew first blood with a 56-yard touchdown pass from Donovan McNabb to Reggie Brown that put Philadelphia up 7–0 after the first quarter. Washington responded with a John Hall field goal and a Mike Sellers touchdown run to lead 10–7 at the half. In the third, the Eagles added a David Akers field goal, and the Redskins responded with a Clinton Portis touchdown run to make the score 17–10. In the fourth quarter, with time winding down, the Eagles driving, safety Ryan Clark intercepted a McNabb pass with 1:25 remaining, sealing the win and improving the Redskins to 5–3 at the halfway point in the season.

=== Week 10: at Tampa Bay Buccaneers ===
	1	2	3	4	Total
Redskins	3	10	15	7	35
Buccaneers	7	14	7	8	36

At the halfway point of the season, the Redskins' record stood at 5–3, tied for second in the NFC East with Dallas. On Week 10, the Redskins marched to Tampa Bay for a matchup against the Buccaneers. Tampa Bay struck first with two touchdown runs by Mike Alstott. This made the score 14–3, with the only Washington points coming on a John Hall field goal. After Alstott's second touchdown, Ladell Betts returned the ensuing kickoff 94 yards to bring the score to 14–10. Tampa Bay responded with a 24-yard touchdown pass from Chris Simms to Joey Galloway, making the score 21–10. Washington got another John Hall field goal to make the score 21–13 at halftime.

After halftime, Washington took their first drive of the second half into the endzone on a 7-yard pass from Mark Brunell to Mike Sellers, followed by a converted 2-point conversion on a pass to Clinton Portis, tying the game. Washington also scored on a 17-yard touchdown pass to Ladell Betts, giving the Redskins a 28–21 lead. As the third quarter winded down, Simms completed a 4-yard pass to Ike Hilliard to tie the game at 28–28 entering the fourth quarter. Portis added a 5-yard touchdown run to give the Redskins a 35–28 lead. With the game on the line, Simms led Tampa Bay to a game-winning touchdown drive with a 30-yard pass to Edell Shepherd. The Redskins appeared to have blocked the extra point attempt, but were ruled offsides. As a result, Tampa Bay elected to go for two, and successfully converted on a controversial run by Alstott, handing the Redskins a 36–35 loss and dropping them to 5–4 on the season.

=== Week 14: at Arizona Cardinals ===
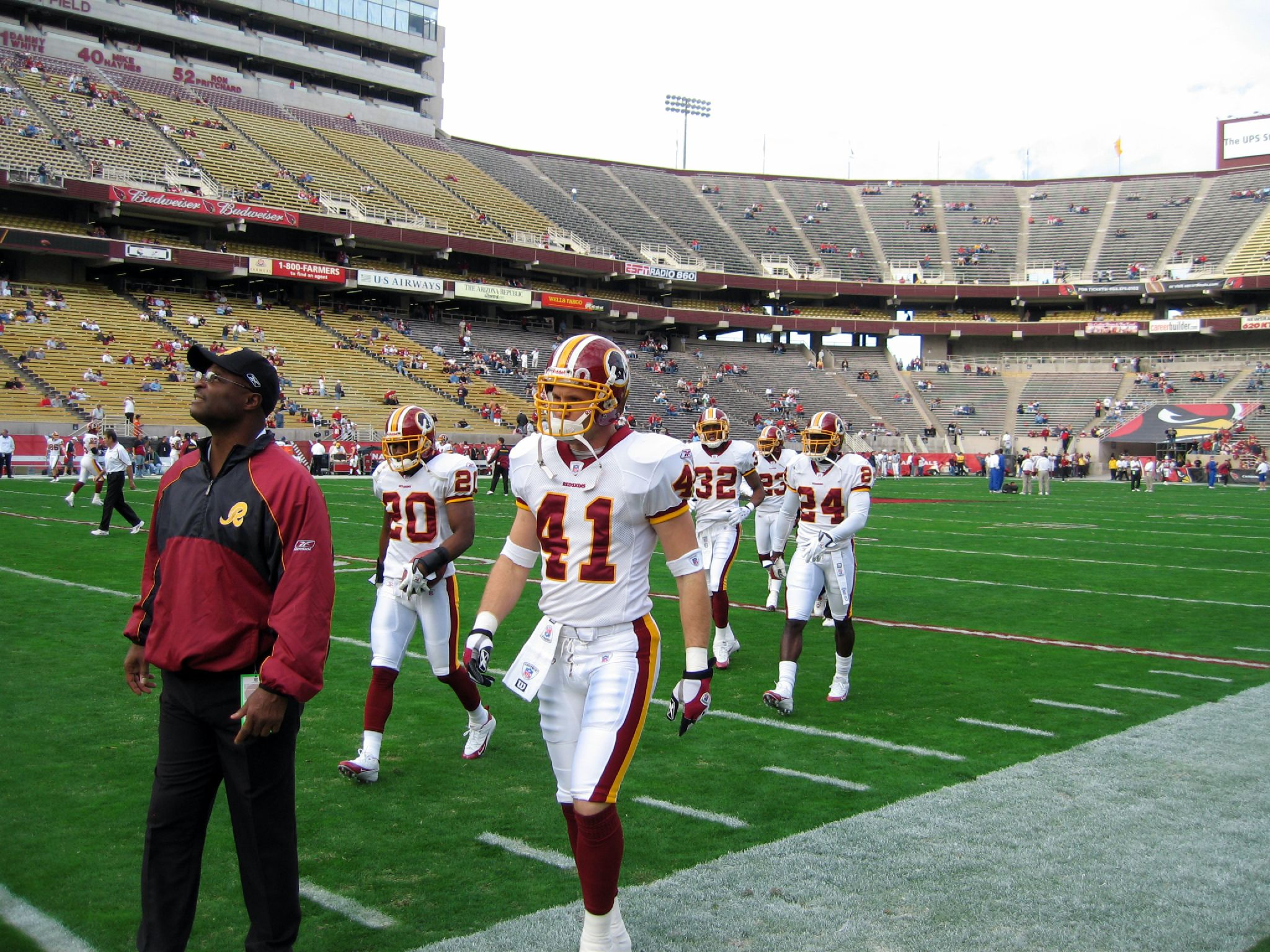
#20 Pierson Prioleau, #41 Matt Bowen, #32 Ade Jimoh and #24 Shawn Springs, week 14

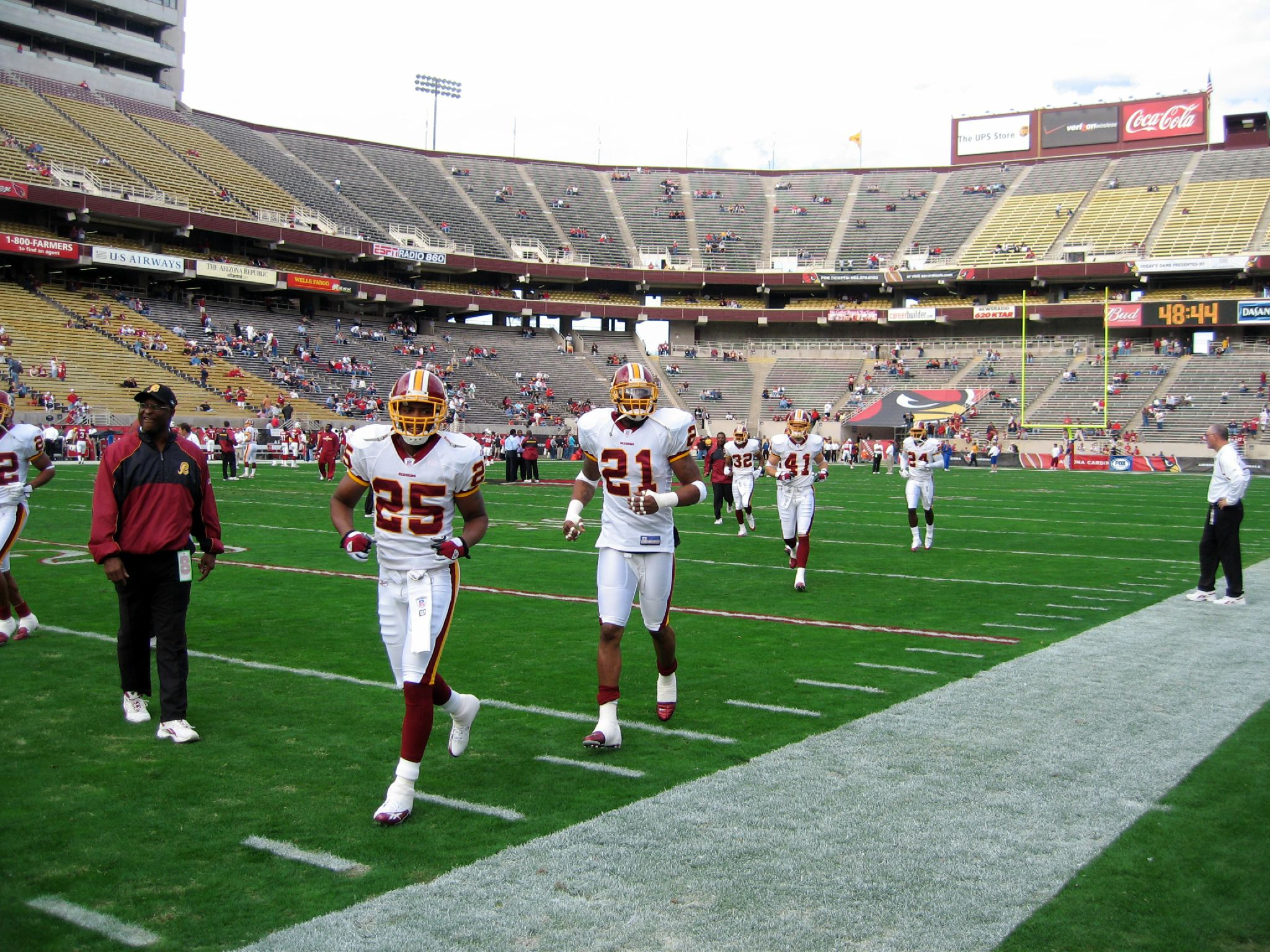
#25 Ryan Clark, #21 Sean Taylor and #41 Matt Bowen, week 14

=== Week 16: vs. New York Giants ===
	1	2	3	4	Total
Giants	10	7	3	0	20
Redskins	14	7	7	7	35

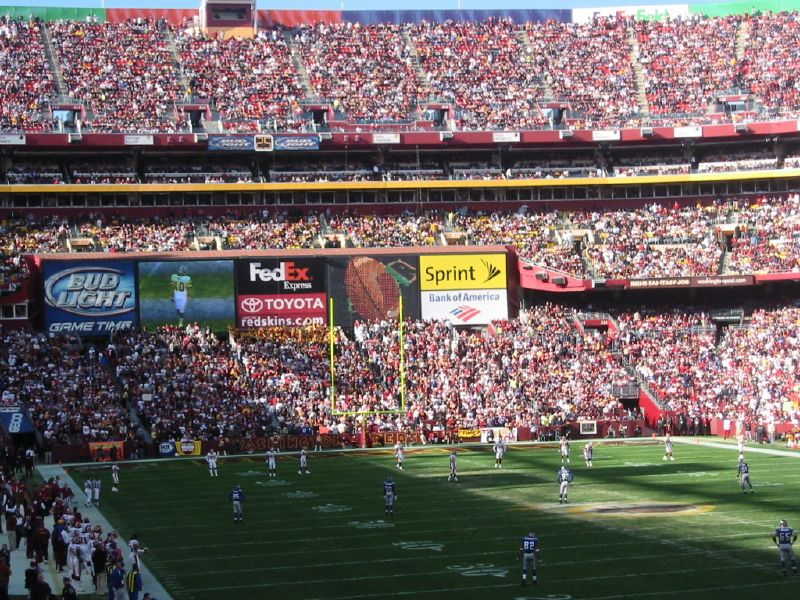
Players line up at Washington, December 24

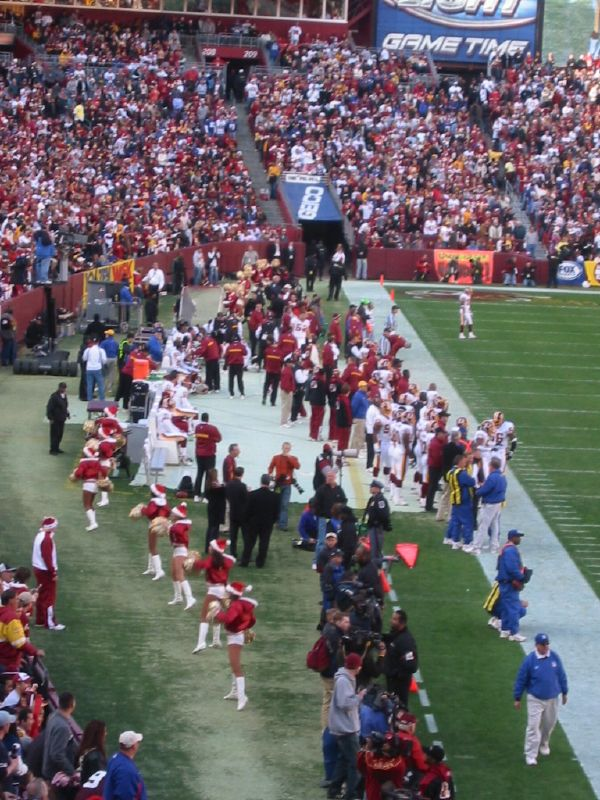
Washington's sidelines during the week 16 home game

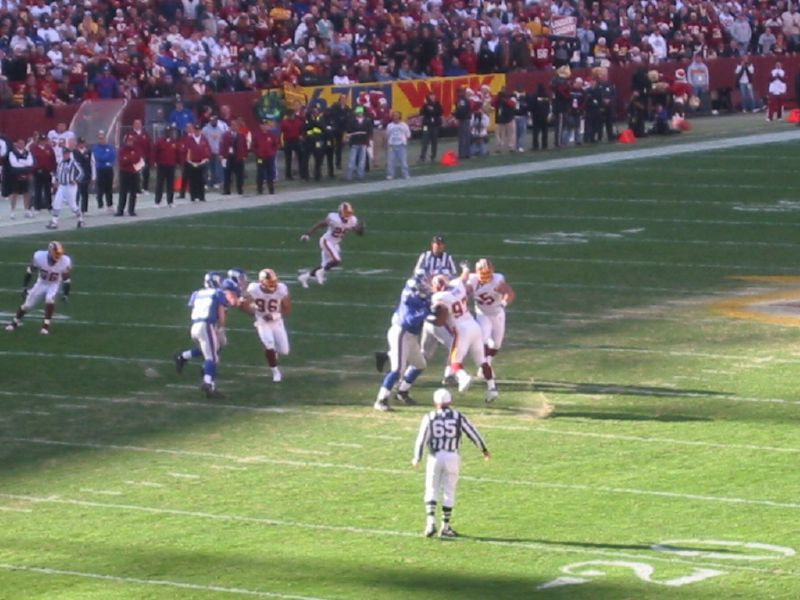
Game action at Washington in week 16

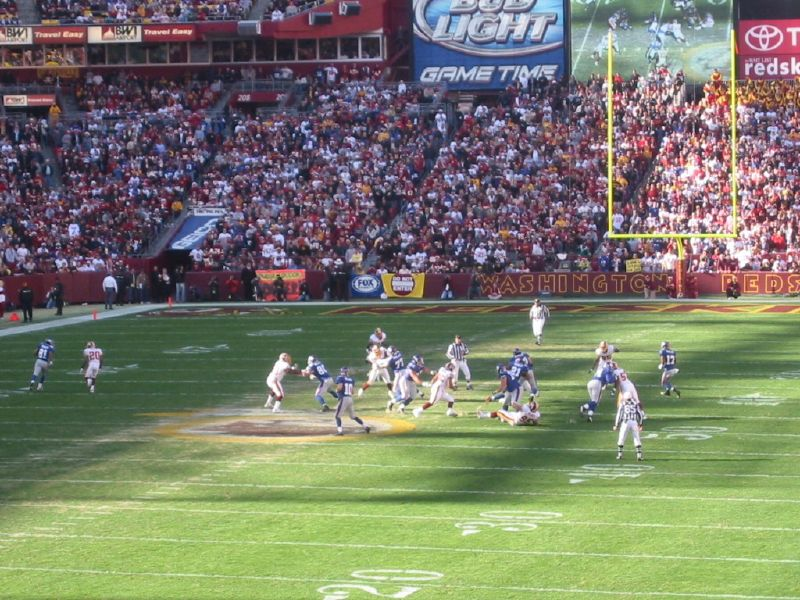
New York at Washington (the game ended 35-20 to the home team)

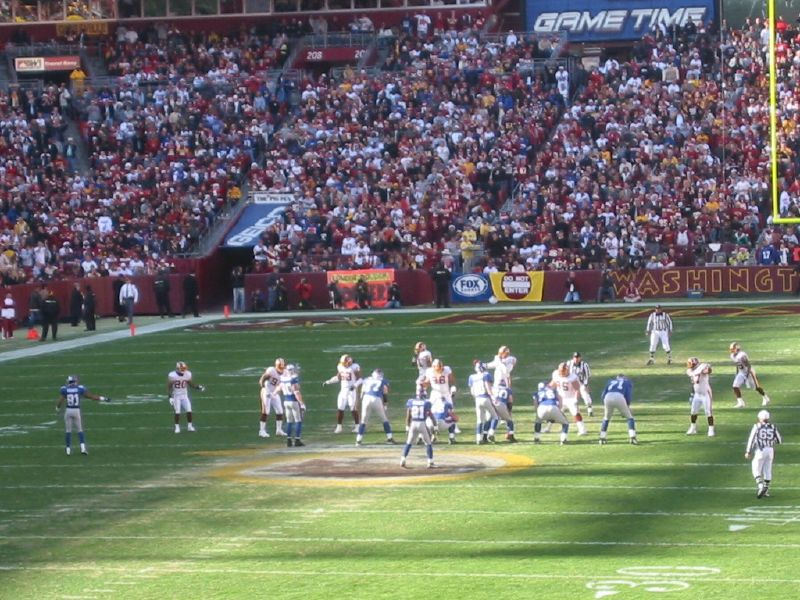
The Giants on offense at Washington

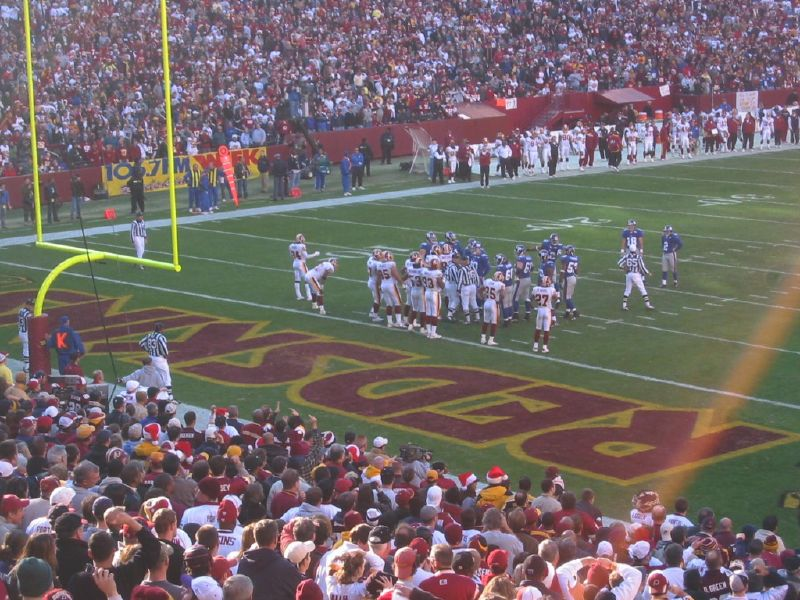
The Giants near Washington's goal line

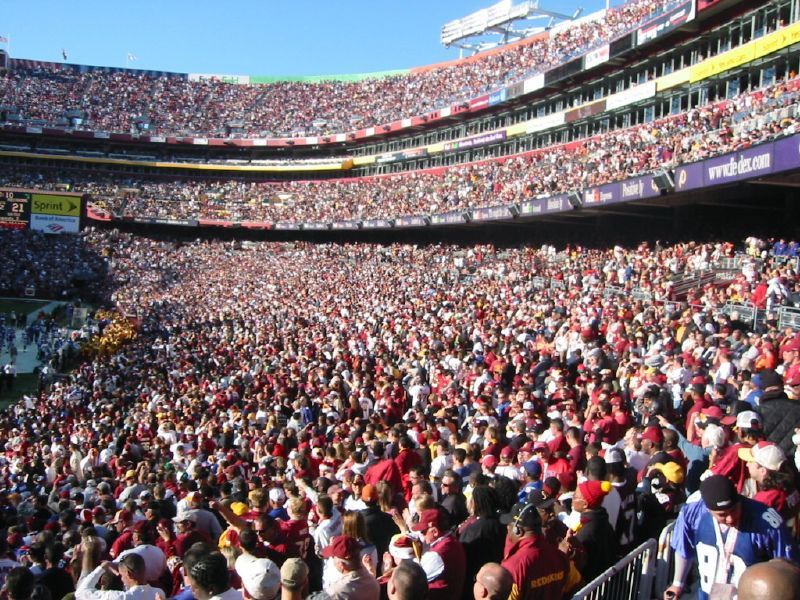
FedExField during the Giants game

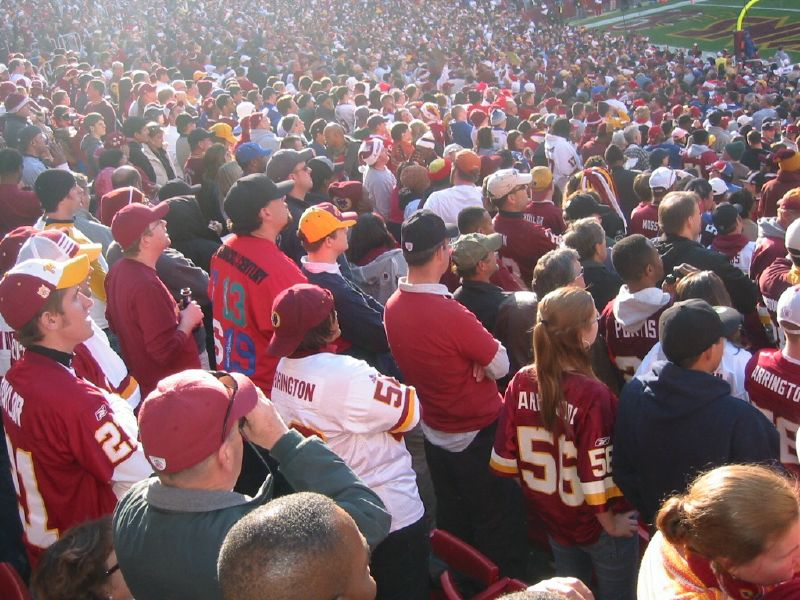
Washington fans during the December 24, 2005 matchup

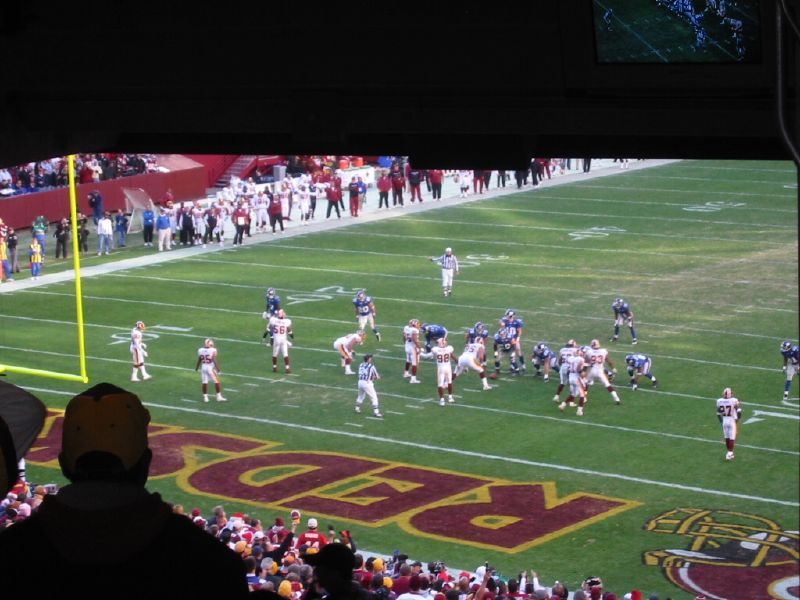
New York's offense lines up

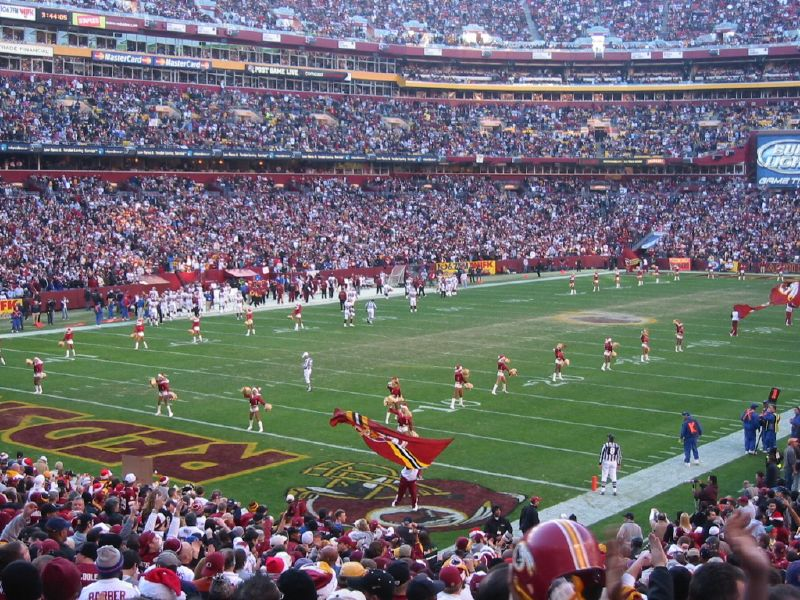
Stadium show at FedExField, Washington vs. New York, 2005

== Playoffs ==
=== Summary ===
The Redskins earned a playoff berth on the back of a 5-game winning streak to end the season. They beat the Tampa Bay Buccaneers in the Wild Card round before losing to the Seattle Seahawks in the Divisional round. It was the Redskins' first trip to the playoffs and first playoff win since the 1999–2000 NFL playoffs.

=== Schedule ===
Playoff Round	Date	Opponent (seed)	Result	Record	Game site	NFL.com recap
Wild Card	January 7, 2006	at Tampa Bay Buccaneers (3)	W 17–10	1–0	Raymond James Stadium	Recap
Divisional	January 14, 2006	at Seattle Seahawks (1)	L 10–20	1–1	Qwest Field	Recap
