= Nic Clemons =

American football player (born 1980)

No. 90, 93
- Position: Defensive tackle

Personal information
- Born: February 3, 1980 (age 46); Griffin, Georgia, U.S.
- Listed height: 6 ft 6 in (1.98 m)
- Listed weight: 300 lb (136 kg)

Career information
- College: Georgia
- NFL draft: 2003: undrafted

Career history
- Washington Redskins (2003–2005); Atlanta Falcons (2007)*; Denver Broncos (2008)*; Omaha Nighthawks (2010)
- * Offseason or practice squad member only
- Stats at Pro Football Reference

Nic Clemons (born February 3, 1980) is an American former professional football player who was a defensive tackle in the National Football League (NFL). He played college football for the Georgia Bulldogs and was signed by the Washington Redskins as an undrafted free agent in 2003.

== Early life ==
Clemons attended Griffin High School, but did not play high school football. Instead, he was a key player on the basketball team that reached the Class AAA final four. As a forward, he averaged five points and four rebounds per game. He is the brother of Chris Clemons of the Seattle Seahawks and nephew of former NFL linebacker Charlie Clemons, who he lists as his role model.

== College career ==
Clemons attended junior college at Georgia Military College where he earned Honorable Mention Junior College All-American in 1999. He recorded 58.5 tackles, 7.5 sacks, eight pressures, three fumble recoveries and three pass deflections as a sophomore. Clemons started playing football for the University of Georgia in 2001, where he played a backup role at defensive end and participated in five contests. He then suffered a hip injury mid-year that ended his season. He played in only two games during his senior season in 2002 before injury (turf toe) ended his season.

== Professional career ==
Clemons signed with the Redskins as a rookie free agent after the 2003 NFL draft. He spent the 2003 and 2004 seasons on the Redskins practice squad. In 2005, he played in eight games for the Redskins and recorded two tackles.
