= Prairie View =

Prairie View or Prairieview may refer to:

in the United States

(by state)

- Prairie View, Lake County, Illinois
  - Prairie View station in unincorporated Prairie View, Illinois
- Prairie View, Kansas
- Prairieview, Missouri, a ghost town in Warren County
- Prairie View (Pleasant Green, Missouri), listed on the NRHP in Cooper County, Missouri
- Prairie View, Texas
  - Prairie View A&M University
    - Prairie View A&M Panthers and Lady Panthers athletic teams representing the university
- Prairie View, former name of Bridge City, Texas

in Canada

- Prairie View, Saskatchewan
