= Corey Moore (safety) =

American football player (born 1993)

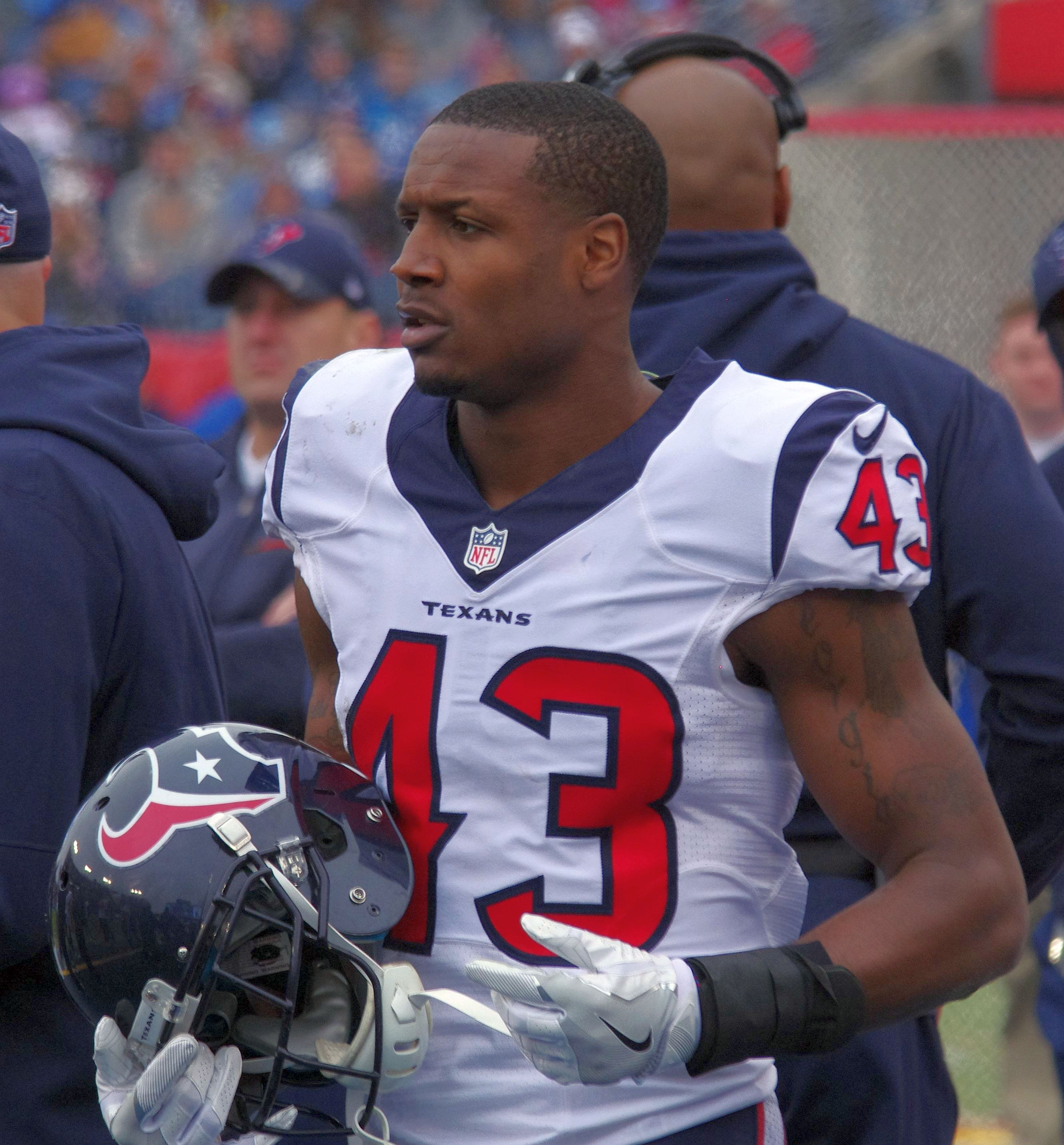
- Moore with the Houston Texans in 2016

No. 43, 36, 31
- Position: Safety

Personal information
- Born: January 28, 1993 (age 33); Griffin, Georgia, U.S.
- Listed height: 6 ft 2 in (1.88 m)
- Listed weight: 200 lb (91 kg)

Career information
- High school: Griffin
- College: Georgia (2011–2014)
- NFL draft: 2015: undrafted

Career history
- Houston Texans (2015–2017); Indianapolis Colts (2018); Tampa Bay Vipers (2020); Ottawa Redblacks (2020)*
- * Offseason or practice squad member only

Career NFL statistics
- Total tackles: 72
- Pass deflections: 5
- Interceptions: 1
- Stats at Pro Football Reference

Corey Moore (born January 28, 1993) is an American former professional football player who was a safety for the Houston Texans and Indianapolis Colts of the National Football League (NFL). He lettered in football, basketball and track at Griffin High School in Griffin, Georgia. In football, he earned SuperPrep All-American honors and played in the U.S. Army All-American Bowl. He then played college football for the Georgia Bulldogs, where he was a four-year letterman. Moore played in 50 games during his college career, recording 76 tackles, one sack, two interceptions and three pass breakups. He signed with the Houston Texans after going undrafted in the 2015 NFL draft. He played in 31 regular season games, starting 11, for the Texans from 2015 to 2017, and appeared in 15 regular season games for the Colts in 2018. He also appeared in playoff games for both the Texans and Colts. Moore later played for the Tampa Bay Vipers of the XFL in 2020.

== Early life ==
Corey Moore was born on January 28, 1993 in Griffin, Georgia and played high school football at Griffin High School, where he was a safety. He was named to the 2010 PrepStar Top 150 Dream Team. He was also named to the SuperPrep All-America team and the All-Dixie team. Moore was selected to play in the 2010 Georgia Athletic Coaches Association (GACA) North-South All-Star Football Classic as part of the South Team, and the 2011 U.S. Army All-American Bowl as part of the East Team. He was also backup quarterback during his senior year. He lettered in basketball and track at Griffin High School as well. In March 2010, he was named the top defensive back at the Atlanta National Underclassmen Combine.

In the class of 2011, Moore was rated a four-star recruit by Rivals.com, Scout.com, ESPN.com and 247Sports.com. He was also rated the No. 5 safety in the country by Rivals.com, the No. 6 safety in the country by Scout.com, the No. 15 safety in the country by ESPN.com, and the No. 4 safety in the country by 247Sports.com. He was also rated the No. 6 safety in the country on 247Sports.com's composite rating, which takes into account the ratings of all the other major recruiting services in the country.

== College career ==
The University of Georgia was the first school to offer Moore and he committed to them on January 30, 2010 during his junior year of high school. He later received offers from other schools, some of which included Auburn, Clemson, Memphis, North Carolina, Miami and Tennessee.

Moore played safety and was a four-year letterman for the Georgia Bulldogs from 2011 to 2014. He received the Erskine "Erk" Russell Football Scholarship each year from 2011 to 2013.

He played in 12 games his freshman year in 2011, recording one tackle. Moore also blocked a punt against Coastal Carolina on September 17, 2011. He appeared in 14 games, starting one, his sophomore season in 2012 and totaled 14 tackles, one of which was a tackle for loss. His one start was on offense against Ole Miss. He was named a team captain for the Vanderbilt game. He also won one of the team's Most Improved Player Awards.

Moore played in 12 games, starting seven, in 2013 and accumulated one sack, one interception, one pass breakup and 35 tackles, three of which were tackles for loss. He appeared in 12 games, with six starts, his senior year in 2014 and recorded one interception, two pass breakups and 26 tackles, two of which were tackles for loss.

Moore appeared in 50 games during his college career and finished with totals of two interceptions, three pass breakups, one sack and 76 tackles, six of which were tackles for loss. He majored in communication studies at Georgia.

== Professional career ==
=== Pre-draft ===
Moore was rated the 23rd best strong safety in the 2015 NFL draft by NFLDraftScout.com. Lance Zierlein of NFL.com predicted that Moore would go undrafted and be a priority free agent. Zierlein also stated that Moore was a "Box safety who doesn't have the speed, range or cover skills to be a reliable, NFL back-end defender."

Pre-draft measurables
Height	Weight	40-yard dash	10-yard split	20-yard split	20-yard shuttle	Three-cone drill	Vertical jump	Broad jump	Bench press
6 ft 0 in (1.83 m)	210 lb (95 kg)	4.56 s	1.62 s	2.56 s	4.40 s	7.06 s	32 in (0.81 m)	10 ft 0 in (3.05 m)	19 reps
All values from Georgia Pro Day

=== Houston Texans ===
After going undrafted in the 2015 NFL draft, Moore signed with the Houston Texans on May 11, 2015. He was released by the team on September 5 and signed to the Texans' practice squad on September 8. He was later promoted to the active roster on December 29, 2015. Moore made his NFL debut and only appearance of the regular season on January 3, 2016, against the Jacksonville Jaguars, recording one special teams tackle. He also played in the team's AFC Wildcard game against the Kansas City Chiefs on January 9.

Due to an injury to strong safety Quintin Demps, Moore made his first start on October 16 against the Indianapolis Colts. Moore then started the next two games at strong safety before Demps returned from injury. Leading up to the Week 13 game against the Green Bay Packers on December 4, starting free safety Andre Hal missed the full week of practice with an illness. During the Packers game, Moore started at free safety in place of Hal, who was active but did not play. Moore then started the final four games of the season at free safety while Hal played in the four games, but did not start any. Moore played in 16 games, starting 8, in 2016 and recorded 25 solo tackles, 7 tackle assists and 3 pass deflections. Hal returned as the starter at free safety for the team's Wildcard round playoff game against the Oakland Raiders on January 7. Moore played in, but did not start, the game against the Raiders and recorded one solo tackle, two pass breakups and a fourth quarter interception as the Texans won by a score of 27–14. Due to strong safety Demps having suffered an injury early in the first half of the Raiders game, Moore started the Divisional round playoff game against the New England Patriots and recorded seven solo tackles, one tackle assist and one pass breakup as the Texans lost by a score of 34–16.

Moore started the first three games of the 2017 season. During the third game against the Patriots, Moore dropped an interception and gave up the game-winning touchdown as the Texans lost by a score of 36–33. Marcus Gilchrist then replaced him as starter. Moore suffered a concussion during the fifth game of the season, which caused him to miss the team's next game. During the 15th game of the season, Moore suffered an MCL sprain. He was placed on injured reserve on December 27, 2017. He played in 14 games, starting 3, in 2017 and recorded 20 solo tackles, 7 tackle assists and 1 pass breakup.

On March 8, 2018, Moore signed a one-year contract with the Texans for $630,000. He was waived by the Texans on September 1, 2018. He appeared in 31 games, starting 11, during his tenure with the Texans, accumulating 46 solo tackles, 14 assisted tackles, and four pass breakups. Moore also played in three postseason games, starting one, totaling eight solo tackles, one assisted tackle, one interception, and three pass breakups.

=== Indianapolis Colts ===
On September 2, 2018, Moore was claimed off waivers by the Indianapolis Colts. He recorded his first career regular season interception on quarterback Derek Anderson in a 37–5 win over the Buffalo Bills. He played in 15 games, no starts, for the Colts in 2015, totaling seven solo tackles, five assisted tackles, one interception, and one pass breakup. Moore also appeared in two playoff games and made one solo tackle.

=== Tampa Bay Vipers ===
Moore signed with the Tampa Bay Vipers of the XFL for the 2020 season. He played in three games for the Vipers, recording two solo tackles and one pass breakup. He was waived on February 25, 2020.

=== Ottawa Redblacks ===
Moore signed with the Ottawa Redblacks of the Canadian Football League (CFL) on March 2, 2020. The 2020 CFL season was later cancelled due to the COVID-19 pandemic. Moore was placed on the retired list by the Redblacks on January 12, 2021.
