= Stacey Driver =

American football player (born 1964)

No. 35
- Position: Running back

Personal information
- Born: March 4, 1964 (age 62); Griffin, Georgia, USA
- Listed height: 5 ft 7 in (1.70 m)
- Listed weight: 190 lb (86 kg)

Career information
- High school: Griffin High School
- College: Clemson (1982-1985)
- NFL draft: 1986: undrafted

Career history
- Cleveland Browns (1986–1987)
- Stats at Pro Football Reference

Stacey Driver (born March 4, 1964, in Griffin, Georgia), played as a running back at Griffin High School, and was given the title of Allstate and All American. In 1982, Driver began his career at Clemson University. He played as a running back for the Tigers until 1985. In 1987 Driver signed with the Cleveland Browns as a free agent; he played for one season before sustaining a serious knee injury.
