= Griffin High School (Georgia) =

Public high school in Griffin, Georgia, United States

Location
- 1617 West Poplar Street; Griffin, Georgia 30224; United States; 33.24352°N 84.3012°W

Information
- Motto: Sapere aude (Dare to Know)
- School district: Griffin-Spalding County School District
- Principal: Herbert Chambers
- Teaching staff: 93.30 (on an FTE basis)
- Grades: 9–12
- Enrollment: 1,479 (2023–2024)
- Student to teacher ratio: 15.85
- Colors: Green and gold
- Fight song: Tune of "Wildcat Victory"
- Mascot: Grizzly Bear
- Website: www.griffinhighschool.org
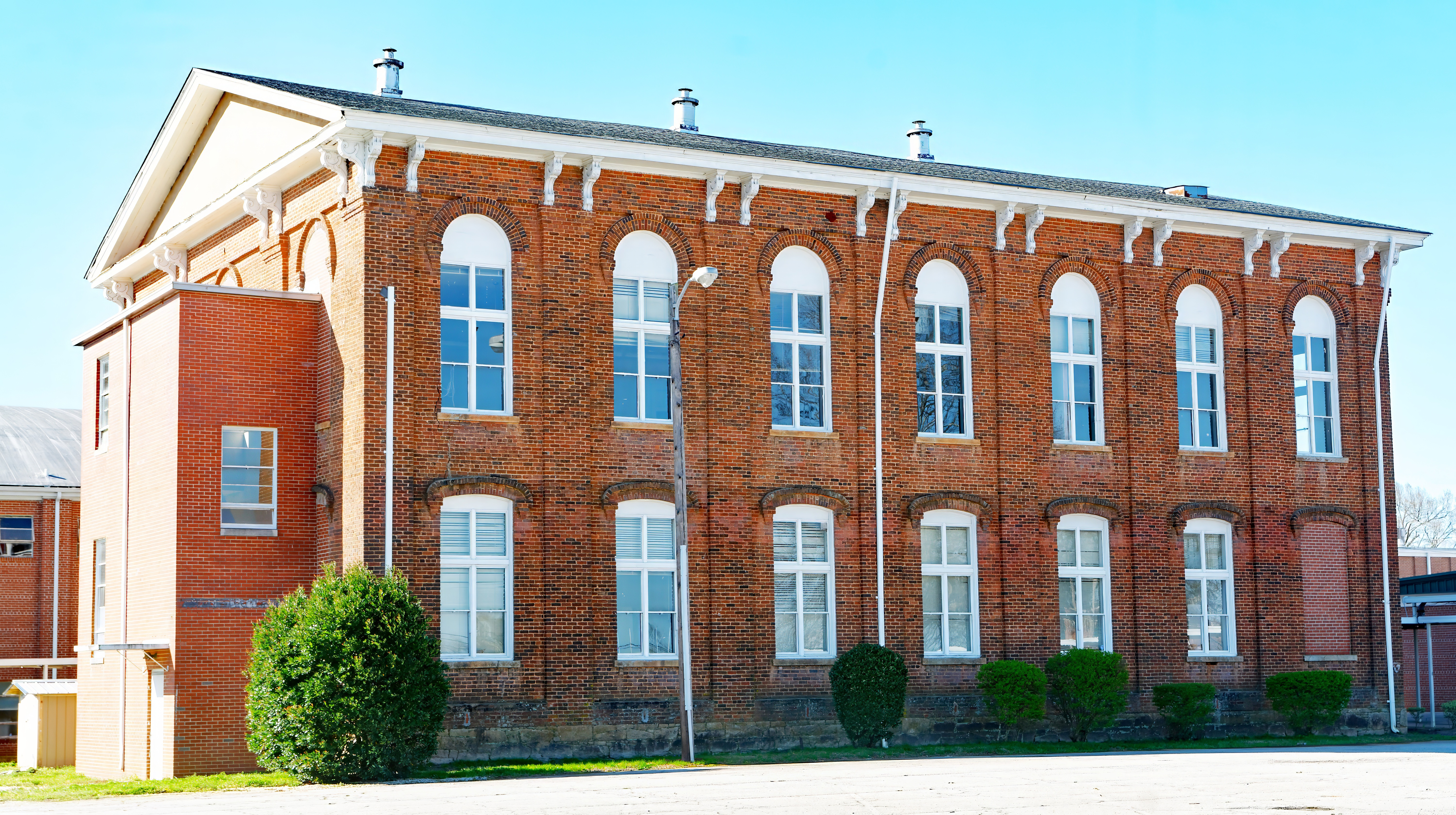

Griffin High School is located in Griffin, Georgia, United States. It is part of the Griffin-Spalding County School District. The mascot of Griffin High School is the Bear. The school's colors are green and gold. The Sam Bailey Building is part of the school and is on the National Register of Historic Places.

== Notable alumni ==
=== Military ===
- General Stephen Townsend – retired United States Army four-star general who served as Commander United States Africa Command

=== Miscellaneous ===
- Brian Bohannon – college football coach

=== Professional baseball players ===
- Tim Beckham – former MLB infielder
- Cornelius Randolph – professional baseball outfielder
- Jeff Treadway – former MLB second baseman

=== Professional basketball players ===
- Darrin Hancock – former NBA player
- Brent Petway – professional basketball player

=== Professional football players ===
- Randy Baldwin – former NFL running back
- Ken Barfield – NFL offensive and defensive tackle
- John Brewer – former American Professional Football Association (APFA) guard/halfback
- Charlie Clemons – former NFL linebacker, Super Bowl XXXIV champion with the St. Louis Rams
- Chris Clemons – former NFL defensive end, Super Bowl XLVIII champion with the Seattle Seahawks
- Nic Clemons – former NFL defensive tackle
- Xzavier Dickson – former NFL linebacker, two-time BCS national champion at Alabama
- Stacey Driver – former NFL running back
- 'Omar Ellison – former NFL wide receiver, college football national champion at Florida State
- Willie Gault – NFL wide receiver, Super Bowl XX champion with the Chicago Bears, U.S. Olympic sprinter
- Freddie Gilbert – former NFL defensive end
- Sherrod Martin – former NFL safety
- Greg McCrary – NFL tight end
- Alton Montgomery – NFL cornerback/kick returner
- Corey Moore – NFL safety
- Dwayne Morgan – NFL offensive tackle
- Bobby Rainey – NFL running back/return specialist, Super Bowl XLVII champion with the Baltimore Ravens
- Johnathan Sullivan – NFL defensive tackle
- Ben Talley – NFL linebacker
- Jessie Tuggle – NFL linebacker, five-time Pro Bowl selection, Atlanta Falcons Ring of Honor, member of the College Football Hall of Fame
- Chandler Worthy – former NFL and CFL wide receiver
- Rayfield Wright – NFL offensive tackle, two-time Super Bowl champion, six-time Pro Bowler, Dallas Cowboys Ring of Honor, member of the Pro Football Hall of Fame
