= Griffin Technical College =

Public college in Griffin, Georgia, US

Coordinates: 33.2549°N 84.2902°W

Griffin Technical College was a public, accredited two-year postsecondary college located in Griffin, Georgia.

== History ==
Griffin Technical College traced its roots to September 1963 when students began attending classes in temporary quarters of the Griffin-Spalding County Area Vocational Technical School, under the supervision of the Georgia Department of Education. The first 48,000-square-foot (4,500 m^{2}) building was completed in 1966. The school was expanded in 1978 with the addition of 18,748 square feet (1,742 m^{2}) of classroom space.

In 1985, the State Board of Postsecondary Vocational Education was established. Schools were encouraged to join this network. In July 1988, Governor Joe Frank Harris elevated this board to a department, changing the name to the Department of Technical and Adult Education. Griffin Tech adopted the name Griffin Technical Institute and joined the system in July 1987.

In August 1990, Griffin Tech dedicated a new facility, a 26,000-square-foot (2,400 m^{2}) office, classroom and lecture hall addition. In the spring of 1995, the new Academic Building provided 15,297 square feet (1,421 m^{2}) of additional classroom and office space. In September 1995, 7 acres (28,000 m^{2}) were acquired from the City of Griffin, and in February 1997, an additional 7.49 acres (30,300 m^{2}) vacated by the Georgia State Patrol Station was acquired providing an additional 7,223 square feet (671 m^{2}) of classroom and office space.

During the spring 1999 legislative session, funds were given for the planning phase of a 65,000-square-foot (6,000 m^{2}) addition. Construction was completed in 2004 and the facility includes classroom and lab space for ten new programs, office space and a conference room, an expanded library, and a large student break area with hot grill.

In March 2000, Governor Roy Barnes included a name change initiative in his "A+ Education Reform Act of 2000" (HB 1187). This act passed the Georgia General Assembly during the 2000 session, and went into effect on July 1, 2000. Until this legislation was approved, the institutions governed by the Board of Technical and Adult Education were prohibited from using the word "college" in their official names. The term "technical college" more accurately reflects the quality and levels of services provided by these institutions to the citizens of Georgia.

On July 6, 2000, at 3:30 p.m., Griffin Technical Institute officially became Griffin Technical College. Since then, additional campuses have been added in Jasper County and Butts County to increase the offerings at the college. In 2008, the State Board of the Technical College System of Georgia ordered that Griffin Technical College be merged with Flint River Technical College in an effort to consolidate technical colleges into larger schools and save funds and resources.

== Southern Crescent Technical College ==
In January 2009, the joint boards of both colleges combined and selected the name of Southern Crescent Technical College as the new designation for the combined colleges and the satellite campuses in Butts County, Jasper County and Taylor County. Dr. Robert Arnold, President of Griffin Technical College was selected to head the new Southern Crescent Technical College, Mr. Michael Brewer, Chairman of Griffin Tech was elected as the new chairman and Dr. Robert Patrick, Chairman of Flint River Tech was elected as Vice Chairman.
