= Bailey-Tebault House =

Historic house in Georgia, United States

- U.S. National Register of Historic Places
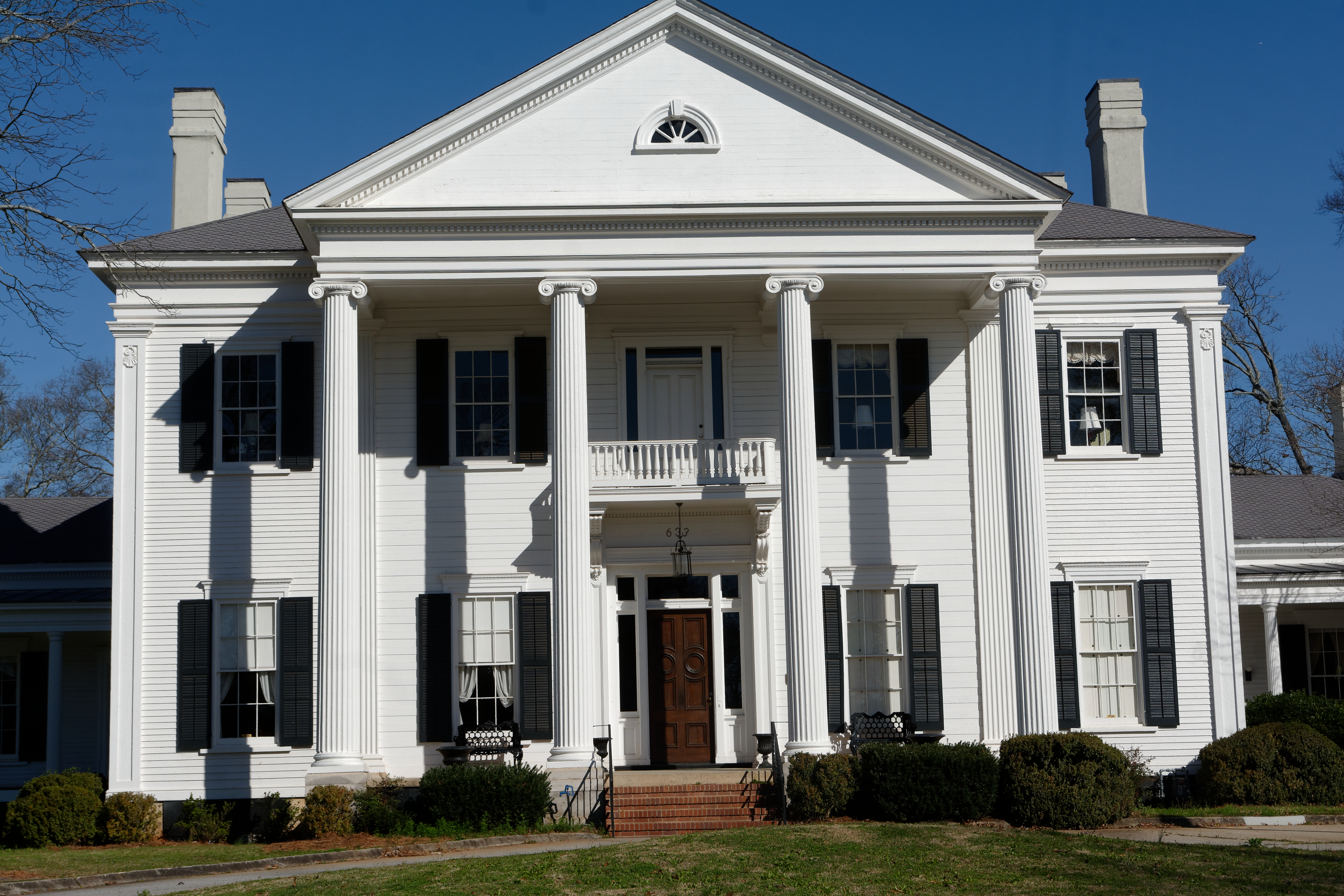

- Location within Georgia
- Location: 633 Meriwether St., Griffin, Georgia
- Coordinates: 33°14′39″N 84°16′25″W
- Area: 4.5 acres (1.8 ha)
- Built: 1859-1862
- Architectural style: Greek Revival
- NRHP reference No.: 73002146
- Added to NRHP: March 20, 1973

The Bailey-Tebault House, located at 633 Meriwether St. in Griffin, Georgia, is a Greek Revival-style mansion which was built during 1859–1862. It was listed on the National Register of Historic Places in 1973.

It was deemed an "exceptionally fine Greek Revival home in the piedmont region of Georgia. The quality of its detailing and the proportions of its composition, as well as its commanding location, contribute to its distinction." The house consists of a square two-story section with a hipped roof and projecting one-story wings, also with hipped roofs. It has a two-story, three-bay, four-column portico surmounted by a pediment. "Above this portico and around the entire central portion of the house is a strongly projecting cornice and a simple, precisely delineated entablature."

The design of the house may have been inspired by a frontispiece illustration in architect Minard LaFever's "Design of a Country Villa". Its completion was delayed because mill work ordered from Philadelphia could not be delivered due to the Union blockade of the south in the American Civil War.

As of 2026, it houses the Griffin-Spalding Historical Society.
