= Charlie Clemons =

American football player (born 1972)

No. 31, 48, 56, 50
- Position: Linebacker

Personal information
- Born: July 4, 1972 (age 54); Griffin, Georgia, U.S.
- Listed height: 6 ft 2 in (1.88 m)
- Listed weight: 250 lb (113 kg)

Career information
- High school: Griffin
- College: Georgia
- NFL draft: 1994: undrafted

Career history
- Winnipeg Blue Bombers (1994–1995); Ottawa Rough Riders (1995); Winnipeg Blue Bombers (1996); St. Louis Rams (1997–1999); New Orleans Saints (2000–2002); Houston Texans (2003)

Awards and highlights
- Super Bowl champion (XXXIV)

Career NFL statistics
- Tackles: 251
- Sacks: 20
- Interceptions: 2
- Stats at Pro Football Reference

Charlie Fitzgerald Clemons (born July 4, 1972) is an American former professional football player who was a linebacker in the National Football League (NFL). He played college football for the Georgia Bulldogs. He was signed by the St. Louis Rams as a free agent in 1997.

Clemons also played for the New Orleans Saints and Houston Texans. He earned a Super Bowl ring with the Rams in Super Bowl XXXIV. In the Rams 1999 season he had 44 tackles, 23 of which were on special teams. He was a free agent after the 1999 season, and in early 2000 signed a four-year $6 million deal with the Saints.

He is the uncle of Seattle Seahawks defensive end Chris Clemons and free agent Nic Clemons.
