= Ken Barfield =

American football player (1929–2000)

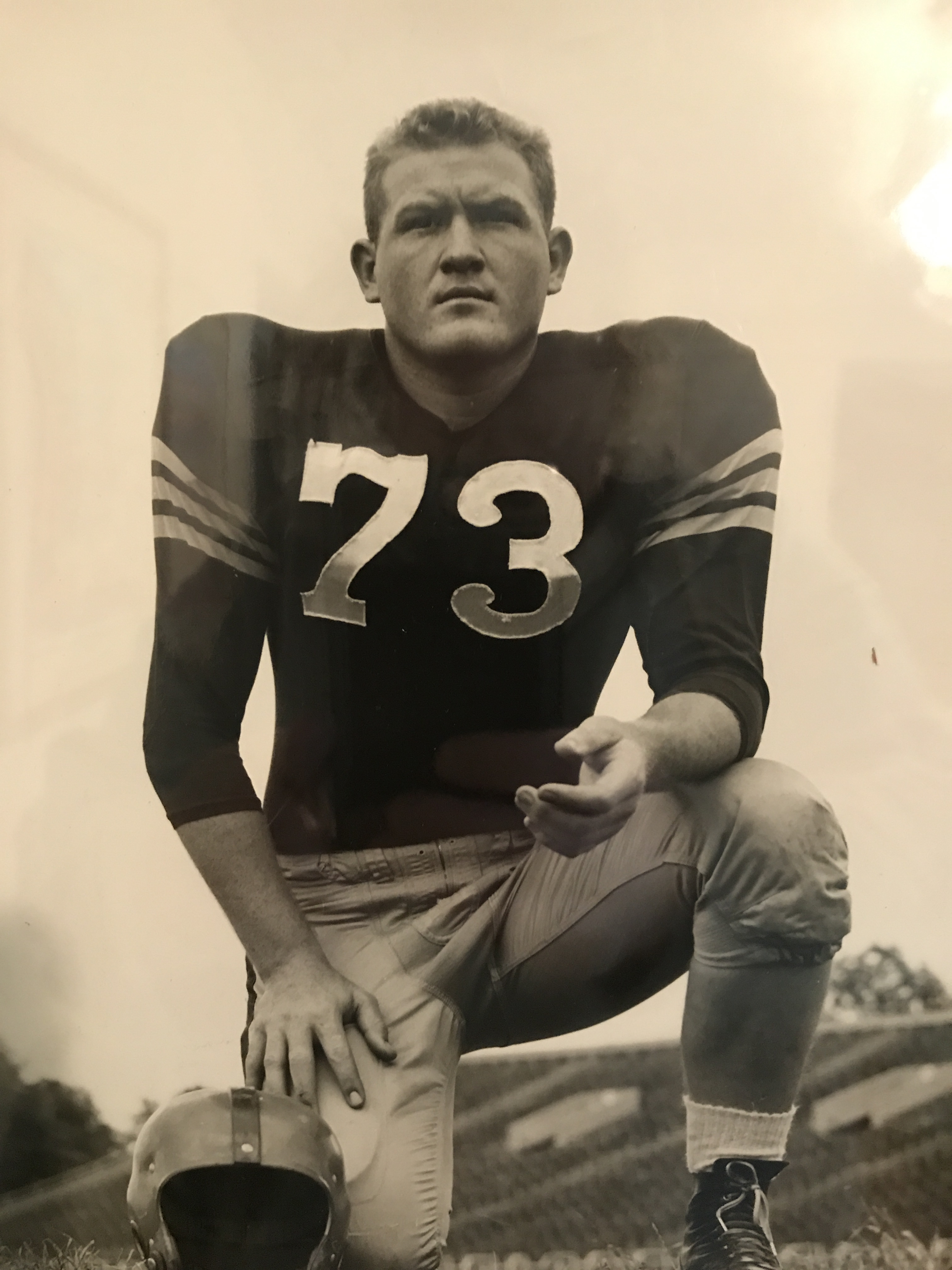
- Barfield at the 1952 North-South Shrine Game

No. 73
- Positions: Offensive tackle, defensive tackle

Personal information
- Born: July 19, 1929; Sunnyside, Georgia, U.S.
- Died: September 24, 2000 (aged 71); Jackson, Mississippi, U.S.
- Listed height: 6 ft 2 in (1.88 m)
- Listed weight: 238 lb (108 kg)

Career information
- High school: Sunnyside; Griffin (GA)
- College: Mississippi (1950–1951)
- NFL draft: 1952: 23rd round, 271st overall pick

Career history
- Washington Redskins (1954)

Career NFL statistics
- Games played: 8
- Stats at Pro Football Reference

Kenneth Alfred Barfield (July 19, 1929 – September 24, 2000) was an American professional football offensive and defensive tackle in the National Football League (NFL) for the Washington Redskins. He played college football at the University of Mississippi and was selected in the 23rd round of the 1952 NFL draft. He is among 226 NFL players recognized for serving during the Korean War.
