= Ben Talley =

American football player (born 1972)

No. 54, 59
- Position: Linebacker

Personal information
- Born: July 14, 1972 (age 54); Griffin, Georgia, U.S.
- Listed height: 6 ft 3 in (1.91 m)
- Listed weight: 248 lb (112 kg)

Career information
- High school: Griffin
- College: Tennessee
- NFL draft: 1995: 4th round, 133rd overall pick

Career history
- New York Giants (1995–1996); Atlanta Falcons (1998)

Awards and highlights
- 2× Second-team All-SEC (1993, 1994)

Career NFL statistics
- Tackles: 2
- Fumble recoveries: 1
- Stats at Pro Football Reference

Benjamin Jermaine Talley (born July 14, 1972) is an American former professional football player who was a linebacker for two seasons in the National Football League (NFL) with the New York Giants and Atlanta Falcons. He was selected by the Giants in the fourth round of the 1995 NFL draft. He played college football for the Tennessee Volunteers.

== Early life ==
Benjamin Jermaine Talley was born on July 14, 1972, in Griffin, Georgia. He attended Griffin High School in Griffin.

== College football ==
Talley played at the University of Tennessee from 1991 to 1994. He started all twelve games for the Volunteers his senior year in 1994, the third year he did so. He also earned All-Southeastern Conference second-team honors after recording 72 tackles and 5.5 sacks in 1994.

== Professional career ==
Talley was selected by the New York Giants in the fourth round, with the 133rd overall pick, of the 1995 NFL draft. He was a member of the Giants from 1995 to 1996, appearing in four games for the team during the 1995 season. He played in eight games with the Atlanta Falcons in 1998.
