= Southern Crescent Technical College =

Coordinates: 33.2550°N 84.2898°W

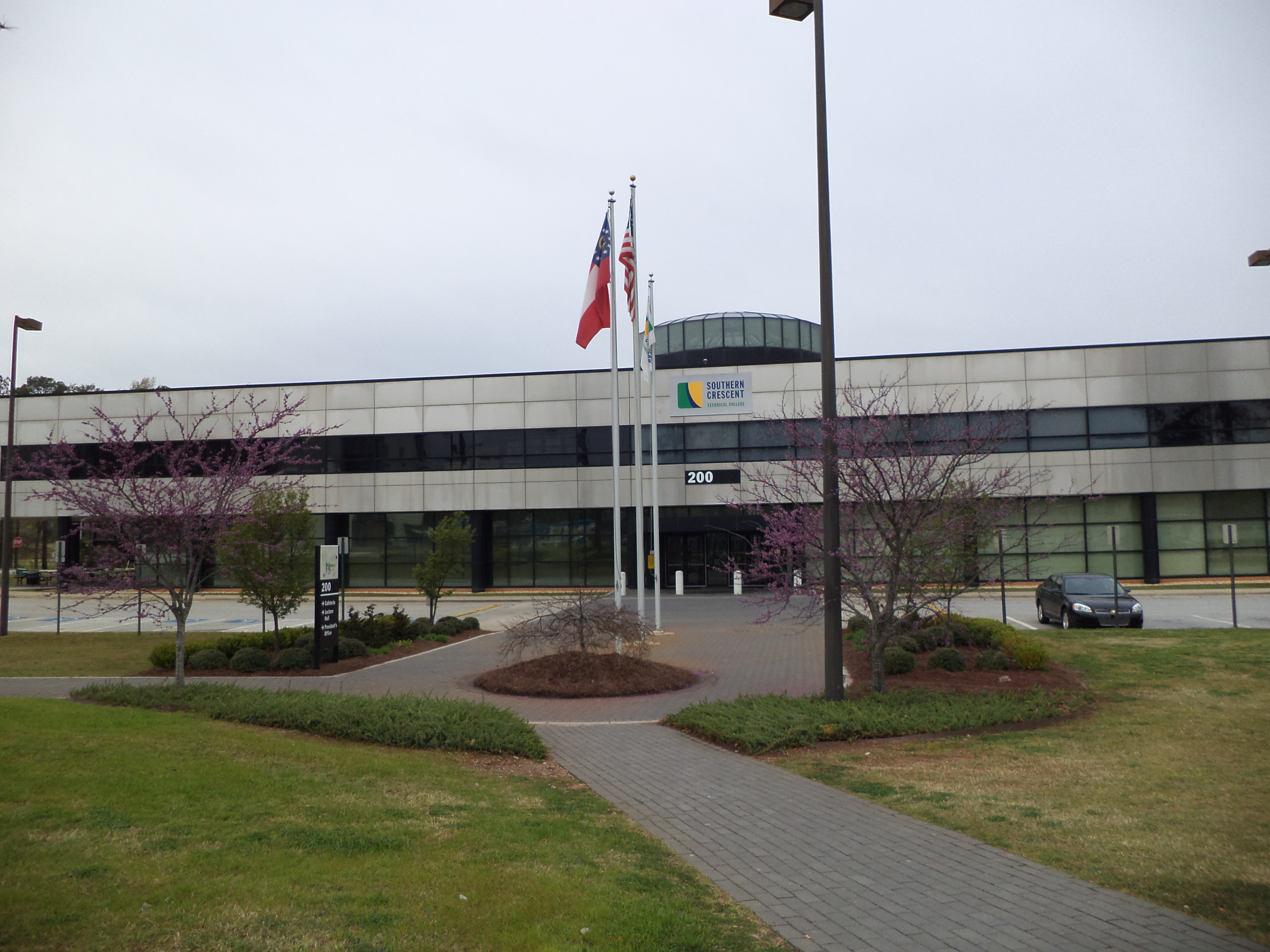
Southern Crescent Technical College

Southern Crescent Technical College is a public community college with two main campuses in Georgia, one in Griffin and one in Thomaston. The McDonough campus of the Henry County Center has the second-largest student enrollment behind the Griffin campus. It also has centers in Jackson, Monticello and Butler.

It had an enrollment of 6,185 students in fall 2024.

Southern Crescent offers programs of study in the areas of business, health, industrial, and public service with choices of associate degrees, diplomas, and technical certificates of credit. It serves Butts, Fayette, Henry, Jasper, Lamar, Pike, Spalding, Talbot, Taylor, and Upson counties.

The college originated from the merger of Griffin Technical College and Flint River Technical College. The merger of these technical schools was approved by the Southern Association of Colleges and Schools Commission on Colleges on Dec. 7th 2009.
