= Pierson Prioleau =

American football player and coach (born 1977)

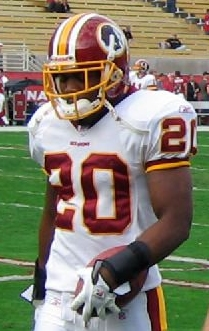
- Prioleau with the Washington Redskins in 2005

Colorado Buffaloes
- Title: Defensive analyst

Personal information
- Born: August 6, 1977 (age 49); Charleston, South Carolina, U.S.
- Listed height: 5 ft 11 in (1.80 m)
- Listed weight: 188 lb (85 kg)

Career information
- College: Virginia Tech
- NFL draft: 1999: 4th round, 110th overall pick

Career history

Playing
- San Francisco 49ers (1999–2000); Buffalo Bills (2001–2004); Washington Redskins (2005–2007); Jacksonville Jaguars (2008); New Orleans Saints (2009–2010)

Coaching
- Radford HS (VA) (2011–2018) Defensive coordinator; Virginia Tech (2019–2021) Director of player development - Defense; Virginia Tech (2022–2025) Safeties coach; Colorado (2026–present) Defensive Analyst/Safeties

Awards and highlights
- Super Bowl champion (XLIV); First-team All-Big East (1997)

Career NFL statistics
- Total tackles: 465
- Sacks: 6
- Forced fumbles: 7
- Fumble recoveries: 4
- Interceptions: 1
- Stats at Pro Football Reference

Pierson Olin Prioleau [PEER-sun PRAY-low] (born August 6, 1977) is an American former professional football player who was a safety in the National Football League (NFL). He was selected by the San Francisco 49ers in the fourth round of the 1999 NFL draft. He played college football for the Virginia Tech Hokies and is the Hokies' former safeties coach. He received a degree from Virginia Tech in interdisciplinary studies, graduating on May 14, 2011.

Pierson served as the director of player development - defense under Justin Fuente at Virginia Tech from 2019 to 2021. Upon the hiring of Brent Pry as the new head coach for the Hokies, Pierson was promoted to an on-field position as the safeties coach, replacing fellow Hokie Justin Hamilton. Pierson announced in December 2025 he was not retained as the safeties coach after the hiring of James Franklin.

Prioleau has also played for the Buffalo Bills, Washington Redskins, Jacksonville Jaguars, and New Orleans Saints.

== College career ==
Prioleau played college football for the Virginia Tech Hokies. As a freshman, he appeared in 11 games on special teams and as a reserve cornerback and finished that season with 24 tackles (15 solo). As a sophomore, he started every game at rover position, appeared in 809 total plays and finished with 71 tackles (41 solo). As a junior, he was named first-team All-Big East and third-team All-America by Sporting News. He posted 81 tackles (41 solo) and two sacks that year. As a senior, he started every game for the defense that led the Big East with only 12.9 points per game allowed. He finished with 61 tackles (41 solo) and two interceptions.

== Professional career ==
=== San Francisco 49ers ===
Prioleau was selected in the 1999 NFL draft by the San Francisco 49ers. While with the 49ers for the 1999 and 2000 seasons, Prioleau started 11 of 28 games he played in as a safety and corner, accumulating 81 tackles and one interception.

=== Buffalo Bills ===
Prioleau signed with the Buffalo Bills on November 7, 2001, but was inactive for first three games after joining the team. Prioleau was impressive when he saw action in the final six games. In his first full season with the Bills in 2002, Prioleau started all 16 games at free safety for the first time in his NFL career. He finished fifth on the team with a career-best 86 tackles and also had 10 stops on special teams. In 2003, Prioleau appeared in all 16 games with six starts in his second full season in Buffalo. He posted 37 tackles, .5 sacks, four quarterback pressures and one forced fumble. In 2004, Prioleau played in all 16 games with two starts in final season with Buffalo. He totaled 37 tackles on the year.

=== Washington Redskins ===
In his first season with the Washington Redskins in 2005, Prioleau played in 15 games, had 43 tackles, three sacks, and a forced fumble.

On opening day 2006, while playing in a game versus the Minnesota Vikings, Prioleau injured himself during the opening kickoff and spent the rest of the season on Injured reserve.

=== Jacksonville Jaguars ===
On April 29, 2008, Prioleau signed with the Jacksonville Jaguars.

=== New Orleans Saints ===
Prioleau signed a one-year deal with the New Orleans Saints on March 26, 2009. He re-signed with the Saints on March 5, 2010 and again on July 29, 2011. He was released on September 3, 2011.

== Personal life ==
Prioleau and his wife, Alicia, have three sons: Pierson Jalen (P.J.), Parker Jayden and Pace Jordan.
