= Lauren-Ashley =

American singer-songwriter

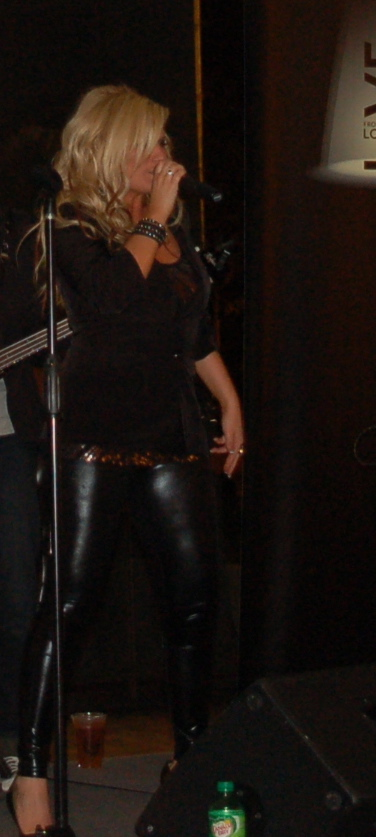
- Lauren-Ashley performing live

Background information
- Born: Lauren Ashley Redmond; November 15, 1991 (age 34)
- Origin: Griffin, GA, United States
- Genres: Country
- Occupation: Singer-songwriter
- Instruments: Vocals, guitar
- Years active: 2010 -present
- Website: www.laurenashleymusic.com

Lauren-Ashley Redmond (born November 15, 1991), known professionally as Lauren-Ashley, is a country singer/songwriter based in Nashville, TN. Lauren-Ashley was raised in Griffin, Georgia, where she attended Flint River Academy for high school and began singing. She attended Georgia Southern University for one year (2010–2011), where she won GSU Idol and shortly after began recording her first EP with producer Trey Roth of Black Cat Studio.

Lauren-Ashley resides in Nashville, TN and performs in the southeastern United States. Notable performances include opening for Ronnie Milsap, opening for Luke Bryan, and performing at the Country Music Hall of Fame in Nashville. She was awarded Georgia Country Female Artist of the Year in November 2011 by voters.

== Biography ==
Lauren-Ashley Redmond was born November 15, 1991, in Griffin, Georgia. As a child, she performed in church and school talent shows. At Flint River Academy, she participated in cheerleading and softball. Lauren-Ashley's involvement in music became more serious in high school. Her senior year of high school, she won second place in a state talent competition.

After graduating from Flint River Academy, Lauren-Ashley attended Georgia Southern University for the 2010–2011 academic year. In October 2010, Lauren-Ashley represented her sorority, Alpha Delta Pi, in the GSU Idol Competition, an American Idol-based singing competition for Georgia Southern University students. After three rounds of performances, Lauren-Ashley was named the winner of the GSU competition. Soon after her GSU Idol win, Lauren-Ashley began working with producer Trey Roth of Black Cat Studio and recorded an EP.

== Artistry ==
=== Musical style and influences ===
Lauren-Ashley's musical influences include Miranda Lambert, Stevie Nicks, Jason Aldean, and Eric Church. Her work is characterized by country vocals and music with a rock edge. All of the tracks on Lauren-Ashley's EP are originals. In the same manner of artists such as Johnny Cash and Kris Kristofferson, Lauren-Ashley writes songs about whatever is happening in life at the moment.

=== Stage performances and public image ===
Audiences enjoy the amount of energy in her performances. Bobby Wheaton believes what sets her apart is her song-writing content choices and her instincts, but does not know whether she will "reach the country radio rotation". Based on her CD sales and nomination for Georgia Country Female Artist of the Year, Shelia Marshall calls her a local and state-wide favorite. Georgia-Country.com gave her EP a positive review, saying that she "displays a great range of vocal talent and creates product that is fun and easy to listen to. While she is definitely influenced by the likes of Carrie [Underwood] and Miranda [Lambert], she also sets herself apart."

== Awards ==
Lauren-Ashley's career began with her win of Georgia Southern University's GSU Idol competition in 2010. Since then, she has also won a national songwriting competition, Wake Up Nashville—and Dream Big. Her song "Cold November" placed first, and her song "Drive" placed in the top ten. Most recently, Lauren-Ashley won 2011 Georgia Country Female Artist of the Year.

== Performances ==
=== Style ===
Lauren-Ashley performs both her original tracks as well as covers, including Heidi Newfield's "Johnny and June" as well as Carrie Underwood's "Last Name".

=== Significant performances ===
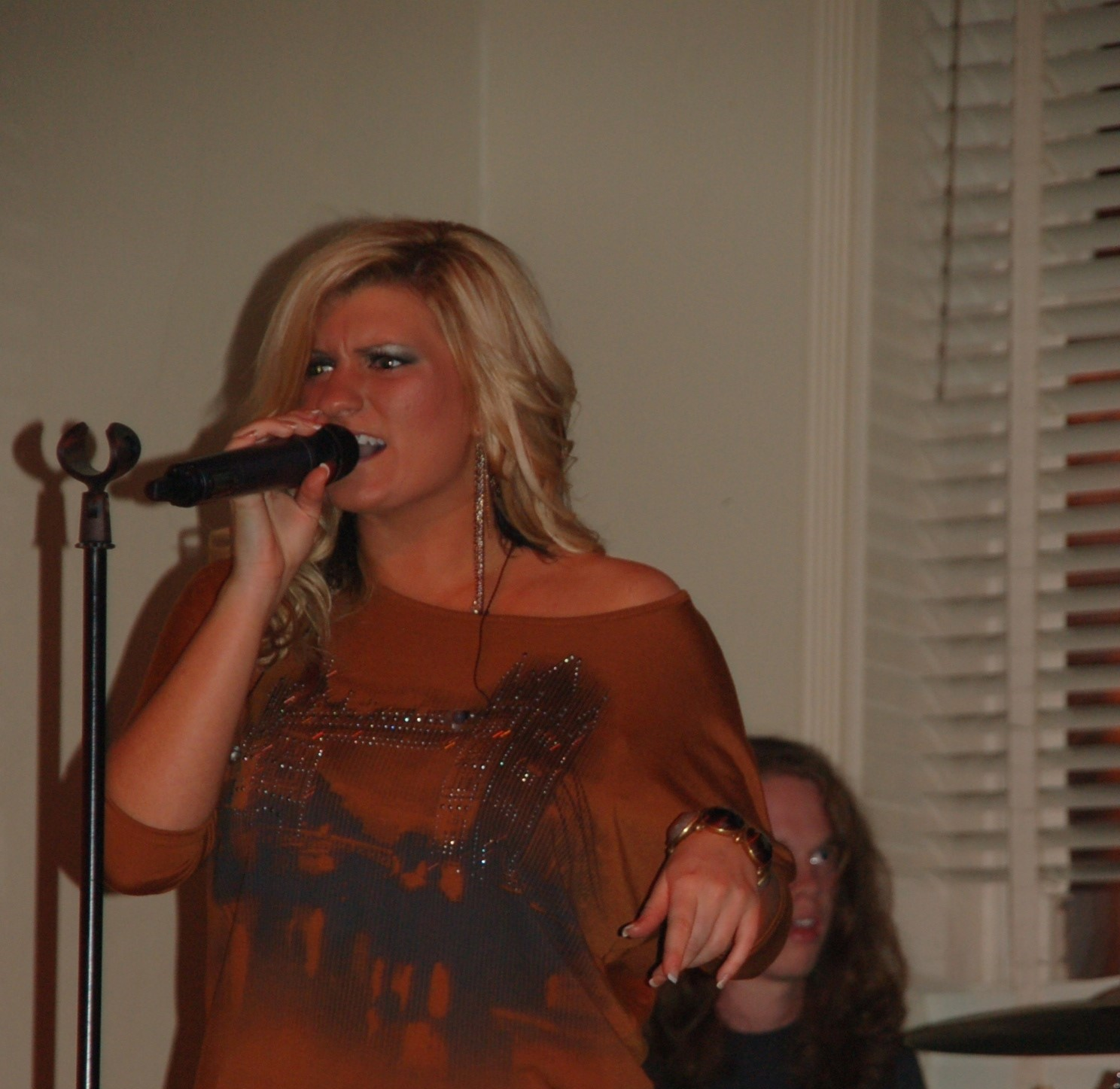
Lauren-Ashley performing

- Ronnie Milsap, opener (2011)
- Country Music Hall of Fame (2011)
- Luke Bryan, opener (2011)

== Discography ==
- Lauren-Ashley (2011)

== Personnel ==
=== Songwriting ===
All of Lauren-Ashley's songs are written by:

- Lauren Ashley Redmond
- Haley Redmond
- Jeff Chandler
- Eryn Erickson
- Trey Roth
- Doug Wick

=== Vocals ===
- Lauren Ashley Redmond (lead vocals, backing vocals)
- James David Carter (backing vocals)

=== Instrumentation ===
- Jason Hoad (acoustic guitar)
- Trey Roth (piano, organ, programming, percussion, acoustic guitar, electric guitar)
- Josh Fisher (drums)
- Tim Gibson (bass)
- John Murdy (electric guitar, pads)
- Chris Carmichael (strings)
- Gaylon Matthews (steel guitar)
