= Pleasant Green, Missouri =

Unincorporated community in the US state of Missouri

Coordinates: 38°48′22″N 92°57′46″W

Pleasant Green is an unincorporated community in Cooper County, in the U.S. state of Missouri. The community is adjacent to the Missouri–Kansas–Texas Railroad just north of Missouri Route 135.

== History ==
A post office called Pleasant Green was established in 1842, and remained in operation until 1954. The community was named after Presley Green Walker, a pioneer citizen. The town site was officially laid out in 1873.

Prairie View is a local house listed on the National Register of Historic Places.
