= Jared Newberry =

American football player (born 1981)

Profile
- Position: Linebacker

Personal information
- Born: April 11, 1981 (age 45); Minneapolis, Minnesota, U.S.

Career information
- College: Stanford
- NFL draft: 2005: 6th round, 183rd overall pick

Career history
- 2005: Washington Redskins*
- 2005: New England Patriots*
- 2005-2006: Tennessee Titans*
- 2006: Frankfurt Galaxy
- 2006: San Francisco 49ers*
- 2007: New York Jets*
- 2008: Team Alabama (AAFL)
- * Offseason or practice squad member only

Jared Newberry (born April 11, 1981) is an American former professional football linebacker. He was also a member of the Washington Redskins, San Francisco 49ers, and New York Jets of the National Football League (NFL). He played college football at Stanford University and was selected by the Redskins in the sixth round of the 2005 NFL draft.

== Early life ==
While attending DeLaSalle High School (Minneapolis, Minnesota), Newberry starred in football, track and basketball. In football, he was a three-time All-Conference selection, and as a senior, was also a team captain. In basketball, he led his team to a state championship as a junior. In track, he excelled in shot put and discus.

== Professional career ==
Selected by the Washington Redskins in the 2005 draft, Newberry went on to play both in the NFL and in NFL Europe.

== Personal life ==
After retiring, Newberry enrolled at Howard University in the business school (2011–2012) and graduated into a position in investment banking with Wells Fargo.
