= Griffin, Georgia =

Griffin, Georgia "The Iris City"
- City
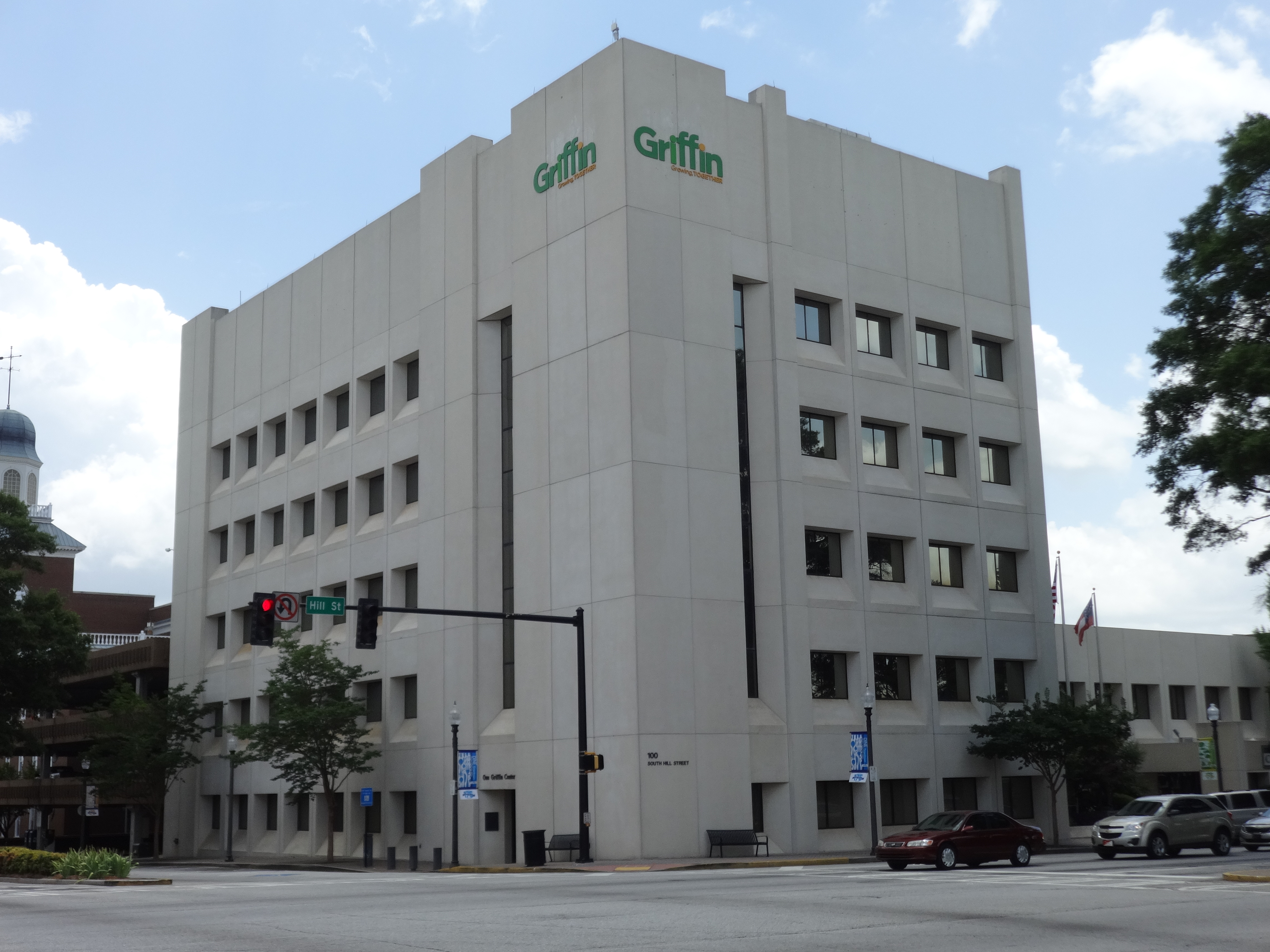
- Griffin City Hall
- Motto(s): Growing, Together
- Location in Spalding County and the state of Georgia
- Coordinates: 33°14′51″N 84°16′15″W
- Country: United States
- State: Georgia
- County: Spalding
- Established: 1840; 186 years ago
- Named for: Col. Lewis Lawrence Griffin

Government
  - Town Manager: Vacant
  - Mayor: Douglas Hollberg

Area
  - Total: 14.12 sq mi (36.57 km^{2})
  - Land: 13.98 sq mi (36.22 km^{2})
  - Water: 0.14 sq mi (0.35 km^{2})
- Elevation: 978 ft (298 m)

Population (2020)
  - Total: 23,478
  - Density: 1,678.8/sq mi (648.18/km^{2})
- Time zone: UTC-5 (Eastern (EST))
  - Summer (DST): UTC-4 (EDT)
- ZIP codes: 30223-30224
- Area code: 770
- FIPS code: 13-35324
- GNIS feature ID: 0356111
- Website: cityofgriffin.com

Griffin is a city in and the county seat of Spalding County, Georgia, United States. It is part of the Atlanta metropolitan area. As of the 2020 census, the city had a population of 23,478.

Griffin was founded in 1840 and named for landowner Col. Lewis Lawrence Griffin.

Griffin Technical College was located in Griffin from 1963 and a branch of Southern Crescent Technical College is in Griffin. The Griffin Synodical Female College was established by Presbyterians, but closed. The University of Georgia maintains a branch campus in Griffin.

== History ==
The Macon and Western Railroad was extended to a new station in Griffin in 1842.

In 1938, Alma Lovell had been distributing religious Bible tracts as a Jehovah's Witness but was arrested for violating a city ordinance requiring prior permission for distributing literature. In Lovell v. City of Griffin, the U.S. Supreme Court found that the city had violated her First Amendment and Fourteenth Amendment rights.

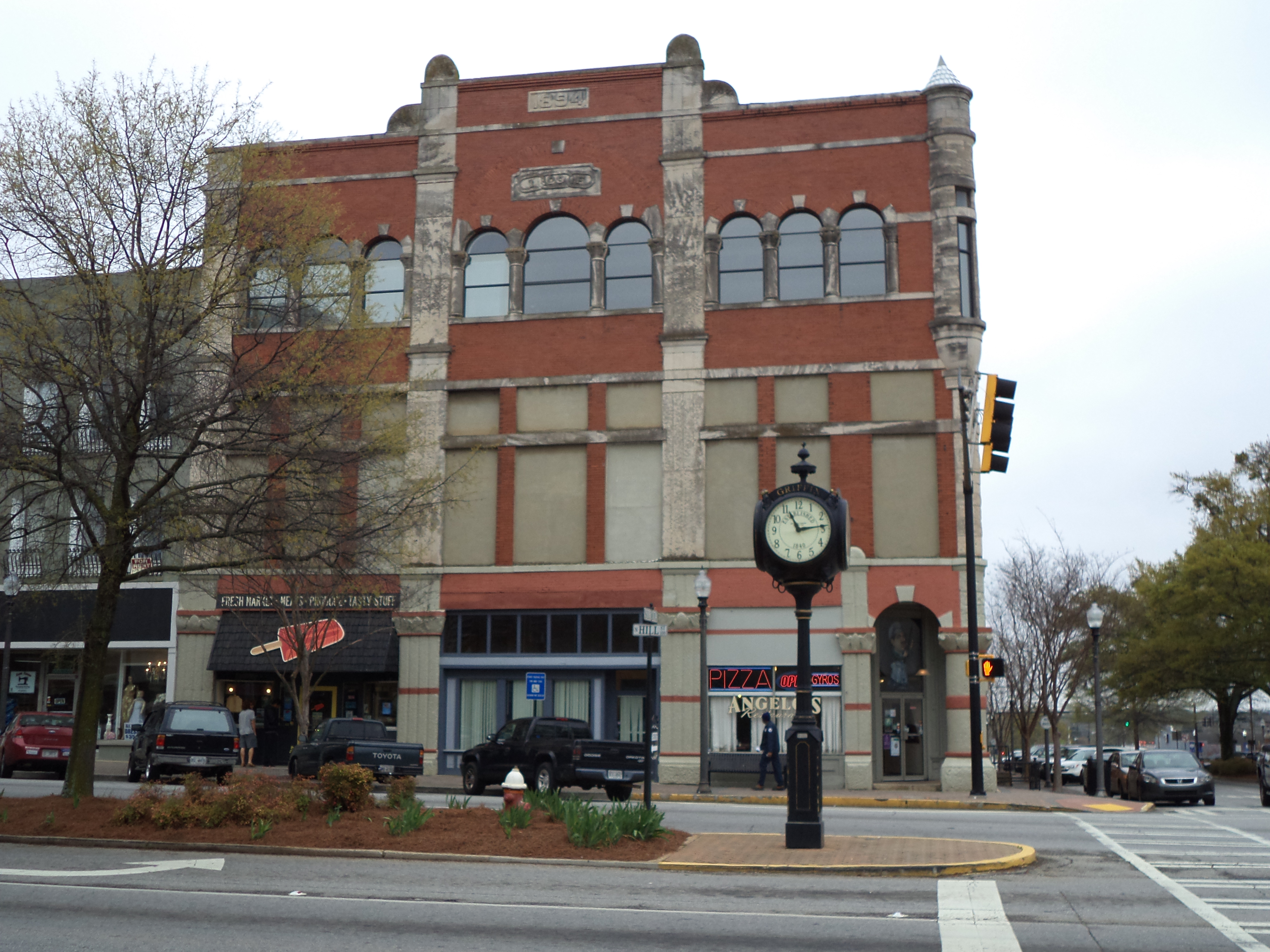
International Order of Odd Fellows Building on East Solomon Street (dated 1894) in Griffin. It also contains the Griffin Opera House.

The Griffin Commercial Historic District (among the National Register of Historic Places listings in Spalding County, Georgia) is generally bounded by Central Alley, Sixth Street, Taylor Street and Eighth Street. The district includes the Griffin Grocery Company Building, now the Griffin Regional Welcome Center.

The western part of the city was heavily damaged by an EF3 tornado on January 12, 2023. The tornado was one of four that were on the ground simultaneously in the area. This particular tornado injured 18 people along its path.

== Geography ==
Griffin is located at 33°14′51″N 84°16′15″W (33.247602, -84.270891). According to the United States Census Bureau, the city has a total area of 14.6 square miles (38 km^{2}), of which 14.5 square miles (38 km^{2}) is land and 0.1 square miles (0.26 km^{2}) (0.55%) is water.

== Demographics ==
Historical population
Census	Pop.	Note	%±
1850	2,320		—
1860	2,855		23.1%
1870	3,421		19.8%
1880	3,620		5.8%
1890	4,503		24.4%
1900	6,857		52.3%
1910	7,478		9.1%
1920	8,240		10.2%
1930	10,321		25.3%
1940	13,222		28.1%
1950	13,982		5.7%
1960	21,735		55.4%
1970	22,734		4.6%
1980	20,728		−8.8%
1990	21,347		3.0%
2000	23,451		9.9%
2010	23,643		0.8%
2020	23,478		−0.7%
2025 (est.)	23,896	▲	1.8%
U.S. Decennial Census; 2025

=== 2020 census ===
As of the 2020 census, Griffin had a population of 23,478. The median age was 36.1 years. 25.7% of residents were under the age of 18 and 15.0% of residents were 65 years of age or older. For every 100 females there were 86.8 males, and for every 100 females age 18 and over there were 81.7 males age 18 and over.

99.4% of residents lived in urban areas, while 0.6% lived in rural areas.

There were 9,207 households in Griffin, of which 34.1% had children under the age of 18 living in them. Of all households, 29.6% were married-couple households, 19.9% were households with a male householder and no spouse or partner present, and 42.1% were households with a female householder and no spouse or partner present. About 30.5% of all households were made up of individuals and 12.9% had someone living alone who was 65 years of age or older.

There were 10,024 housing units, of which 8.2% were vacant. The homeowner vacancy rate was 2.2% and the rental vacancy rate was 5.4%.

Racial composition as of the 2020 census
Race	Number	Percent
White	8,877	37.8%
Black or African American	12,453	53.0%
American Indian and Alaska Native	73	0.3%
Asian	256	1.1%
Native Hawaiian and Other Pacific Islander	11	0.0%
Some other race	649	2.8%
Two or more races	1,159	4.9%
Hispanic or Latino (of any race)	1,231	5.2%

== Education ==
The Griffin-Spalding County School District holds grades pre-school to grade twelve and consists of eleven elementary schools, four middle schools, and three high schools. The district has 661 full-time teachers and over 10,648 students. Griffin Technical College was located in Griffin from 1963 and, following a merger, a branch of Southern Crescent Technical College is in Griffin. The Griffin Synodical Female College was established by Presbyterians, but closed.

Griffin Region College & Career Academy is a public school that is part of the Griffin-Spalding County School District. The University of Georgia maintains a branch campus in Griffin. Griffin Region College and Career Academy are located within the city limits. The GRCCA prepares students for college and careers through actual college courses for both high school and college credits. The Civil Air Patrol aerospace education program promotes aerospace, aviation and STEM-related careers with standards-based, hands-on curriculum and activities at Griffin–Spalding County Airport.

== Sports and recreation ==
The Spalding County Pickleball Association (SCPA) is located at Wyomia Tyus Olympic Park. The SCPA operates, develops and manages programs at the Spalding County Pickleball Complex. The courts are open to the public.

Spalding County Special Olympics Bowling Team bowls every Thursday afternoon from September through March at Magnolia Lanes bowling alley.

The Spalding County Leisure Services Department offers youth sports programs including baseball, basketball, fast pitch softball, soccer, and swimming. For adults, Spalding County offers softball, kickball, and Adult Basketball Leagues: Men's Open and Men's Industrial.

There are at least 21 golf courses within 20 miles of the center of Griffin.

Spalding County was named disc golf capital of the southeast, being home to four courses.

The Griffin Warriors, a World Basketball Association team, played at the high school in 2006.

Griffin, during the "golden ages" of baseball, hosted several minor league Class D level teams:

- Griffin Lightfoots, (1915–1916), Griffin Griffs, (1917) - Georgia-Alabama League
- Griffin - Georgia State League (1920, 1921)
- Griffin Pimientos (1947–1949, 1951) (Class D affiliate of the St. Louis Browns), Griffin Tigers (1950) - Georgia-Alabama League

== Media ==
The Griffin Daily News is a local paper, founded in 1872.

WMVV is a local Christian station, while WKEU (AM) broadcasts oldies. WYFK, a Christian station, has their W290AG translator in Griffin. University of Georgia Griffin Campus has a news radio station on 88.9FM or live streaming at wkeuradio.com.

== Culture ==
The Griffin Ballet Theatre was founded in 1994.

The Main Street Players professional theater was founded in 2001.

Camelot Theatre Company was founded in 1998. https://camelottheatre.com/

The Griffin Museum is located upstairs in the Welcome Center and contains an array of Griffin artifacts and memorabilia, including some dating from the mid-1800s.

Griffin Choral Arts, founded in 2007, is a 50-voice auditioned regional community chorus that performs four major concerts each season.

Griffin Music Club was founded in 1942, and is affiliated with the National Federation of Music Clubs (NFMC).

The Griffin Area Concert Association was founded in 1969. It presents performances by national and international performing artists featuring dance, musical theater, solo instrumentalists, vocal, string or brass ensembles and other performing arts.

Griffin Spalding Historical Society was founded in 1969. Its headquarter is in the Bailey-Tebault House houses at Meriwether Street, of which it provides tours.

The Griffin-Spalding Athletic Hall of Fame was founded in 1983.

Since 1962 the city has presented an early annual Christmas parade, with floats and marching bands, presented by the Southside Riders.

Kiwanis of Griffin was founded in 1940.

In downtown Griffin there is a haunted house attraction, the Sinister Suites Haunted Hotel. It was built in 1910, and after being closed in the 1970s was re-opened as a haunted attraction during October. It features a five-story, 60,000-square foot walk-through of the hotel. But it is closed.

Griffin has been featured or used as a production site in many films and television shows.

== Notable people ==
- Morgan Alexander – racing driver; born in Griffin
- Dee Alford - professional football player
- Bill Anderson - country singer; born in South Carolina and grew up in Griffin
- Edward Andrews - film and television actor; born in Griffin
- Lewis White Beck - philosopher, translator, textbook author, and scholar of German philosophy; born in Griffin
- Tim Beckham - professional baseball player; first overall pick in 2008 Major League Baseball draft after attending Griffin High School; born in Griffin
- Brian Bohannon - head football coach at Kennesaw State; previously played wide receiver for UGA and held a number of assistant coaching positions
- James S. Boynton - politician and jurist; briefly served as the 51st Governor of Georgia from 1883 after the death of governor Alexander Stephens; born in Henry County, Georgia and moved to Griffin in 1865; buried in Oak Hill Cemetery in Griffin
- Jody Breeze - rapper
- Thomas Jefferson Byrd - actor
- Charlie Clemons - football player who played for several different National Football League teams, including the St. Louis Rams team that won Super Bowl XXXIV; uncle of Nic Clemons and Chris Clemons
- Chris Clemons - NFL defensive end and brother of Nic Clemons; played college football for University of Georgia; member of Super Bowl XLVIII champion Seattle Seahawks
- Rodrico Harp, one of the secondary perpetrators of the infamous 1995 Okinawa rape incident
- Nic Clemons - defensive end for the Denver Broncos
- Elbert Dubenion - football player; wide receiver for the Buffalo Bills
- Rick Dyer - Bigfoot enthusiast known for high-profile hoaxes
- John J. Eagan - industrialist and co-founder of the American Cast Iron Pipe Company
- Jack Flynt - lawyer and U.S. Congressman from Spalding County; born in Griffin
- Willie Gault - NFL wide receiver and Olympic athlete; played 11 seasons for the Chicago Bears and Los Angeles Raiders
- Nick Hamilton - pro wrestling referee
- Darrin Hancock - basketball player; played with the 1993 Final Four University of Kansas, the NBA, and various minor league teams after graduating from Griffin High School
- J. C. Hendrix – racing driver; born in Griffin
- Doc Holliday - dentist, gunfighter, and gambler of the American West and friend of Wyatt Earp; born in Griffin
- John McIntosh Kell - Executive Officer of the CSS Alabama; served as Adjutant General of Georgia; born in Darien, Georgia; lived in Griffin in his later life until his death in 1900
- Jan Kemp - academic who exposed the allowing of nine college football players to pass a remedial English course at UGA
- Sidney Lanier - poet, lawyer and musician; lived in Griffin as a child after his birth in Macon; he wrote the poem "Corn" in Sunnyside, several miles north of Griffin
- Lauren-Ashley - country singer
- Sonia Leigh - country singer-songwriter; attended Griffin High School
- Sherrod Martin - former NFL defensive back for the Carolina Panthers
- Karen Mathiak - chiropractor and Georgia state legislator
- William "Billy" J. Nicks - Coach of Prairie View football team; eight Southwestern Athletic Conference titles, five Black College National Championships (1953, 1954, 1958, 1963, 1964), and a 111-27-5 record
- Josh Pace - Syracuse University basketball guard during the school's first national championship in 2003; currently a coach, played professional basketball overseas
- Bobby Rainey - running back for the Tampa Bay Buccaneers and in college for Western Kentucky
- Henry L. Sherman - lawyer and judge; grew up in Griffin
- Kyle Stemberger - record producer
- Ben Talley - football player
- Dox Thrash - printmaker and painter, helped invent carborundum technique; born in Griffin in 1893
- Stephen J. Townsend - U.S. Army general; graduate of Griffin High School
- Jessie Tuggle - football linebacker who played his entire career with the Atlanta Falcons; played in college at Valdosta State after graduating from Griffin High School
- Wyomia Tyus - athlete, Olympic gold medalist, first woman to retain the Olympic title in the 100; born in Griffin
- Rayfield Wright - Hall of Fame offensive tackle (born in Griffin); played in college at Fort Valley State
- John P. Yates - Georgia state legislator
