= Manuel White =

American football player (born 1982)

No. 48
- Position: Fullback

Personal information
- Born: July 2, 1982 (age 44); Panorama City, California, U.S.
- Listed height: 6 ft 2 in (1.88 m)
- Listed weight: 245 lb (111 kg)

Career information
- High school: Valencia (Santa Clarita, California)
- College: UCLA
- NFL draft: 2005: 4th round, 120th overall pick

Career history
- Washington Redskins (2005–2006)

Manuel White (born July 2, 1982) is an American former professional football player who was a fullback in the National Football League (NFL). White attended Valencia High School in Santa Clarita, California. He played college football for the UCLA Bruins and was selected in the fourth round of the 2005 NFL draft by the Washington Redskins.
