= Prairieview, Missouri =

Extinct hamlet in Missouri, U.S.

Coordinates: 38.902545°N 91.194317°W

Prairieview is an extinct town in Warren County, in the U.S. state of Missouri.

A post office called Prairieview was established in 1900, and remained in operation until 1903. The community's name most likely was illustrative of its setting.
