= Prairie View (Pleasant Green, Missouri) =

Historic house in Missouri, United States

- U.S. National Register of Historic Places
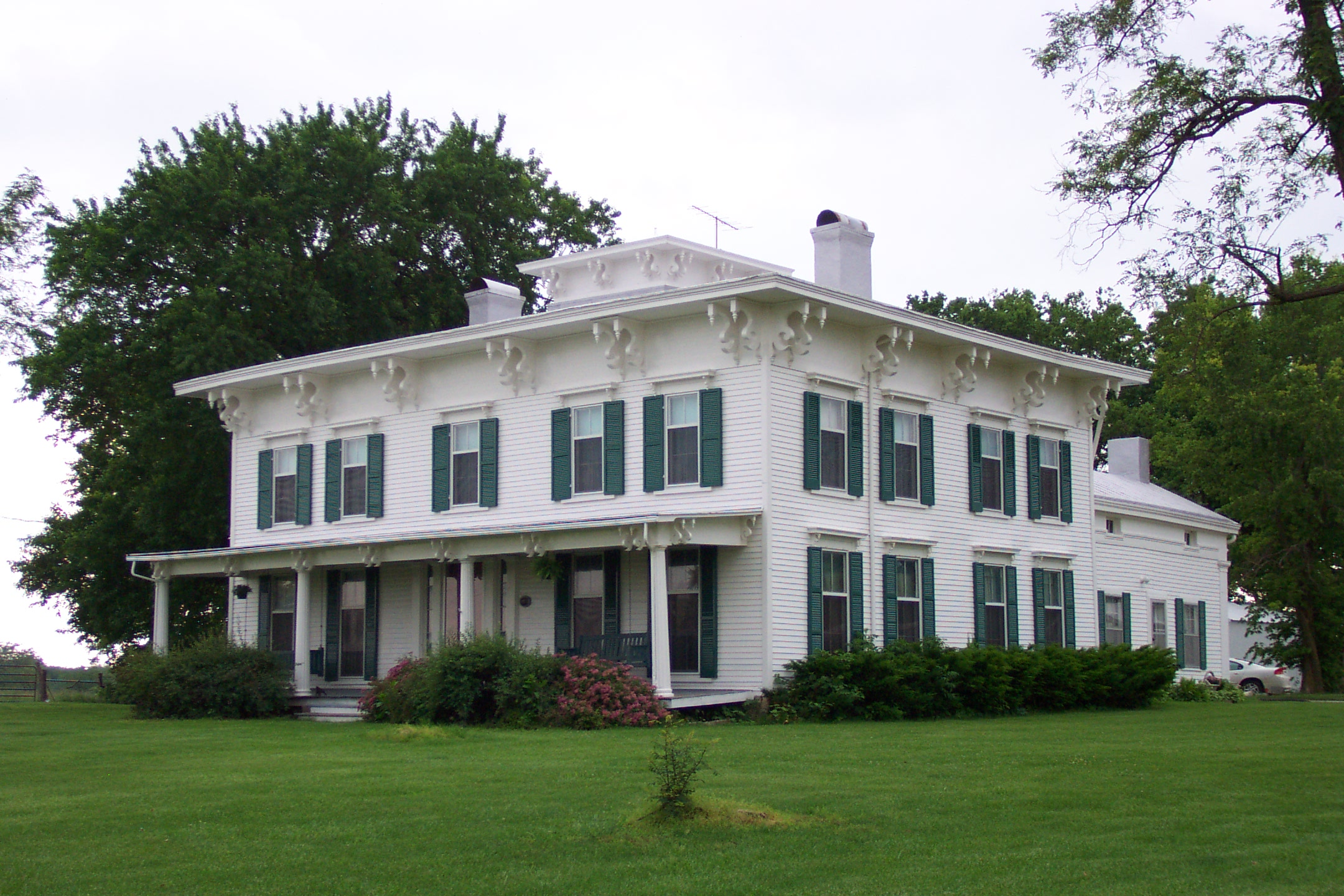
- Prairie View from the front

- Location within Missouri Location within the United States
- Location: RFD #2 Pleasant Green, Missouri
- Coordinates: 38°47′36″N 92°55′51″W
- Area: less than one acre
- Built: 1859
- Built by: Taylor, John
- Architectural style: Italianate
- NRHP reference No.: 82003134
- Added to NRHP: September 20, 1982

Prairie View, also known as the Betteridge Property and Crestmead, is a historic plantation house located at Pleasant Green, Cooper County, Missouri. It was built in 1859 by John Taylor, and is a two-story, Italianate/Greek Revival style frame dwelling with a 1 1/2-story rear ell. It features a single story porch with fluted Doric order columns and paired brackets in the eaves. It is notable for its contribution to local commerce and agriculture of the region. The plantation utilized slave labor from the time of its completion until the end of the Civil War. The Prairie View plantation is a private residence and the current owners are Robert and Ann Betteridge. The Betteridge family have owned Prairie View since 1903 when Robert Betteridge's grandfather William Betteridge bought the house and legally changed the name from Prairie View to Crestmead.

Prairie View was listed on the National Register of Historic Places in 1982.

More than half of the original plantation was destroyed by fire March 3, 2008. Over the course of several years the home was restored to its original state.
