= Chris Clemons (defensive end) =

American football player (born 1981)

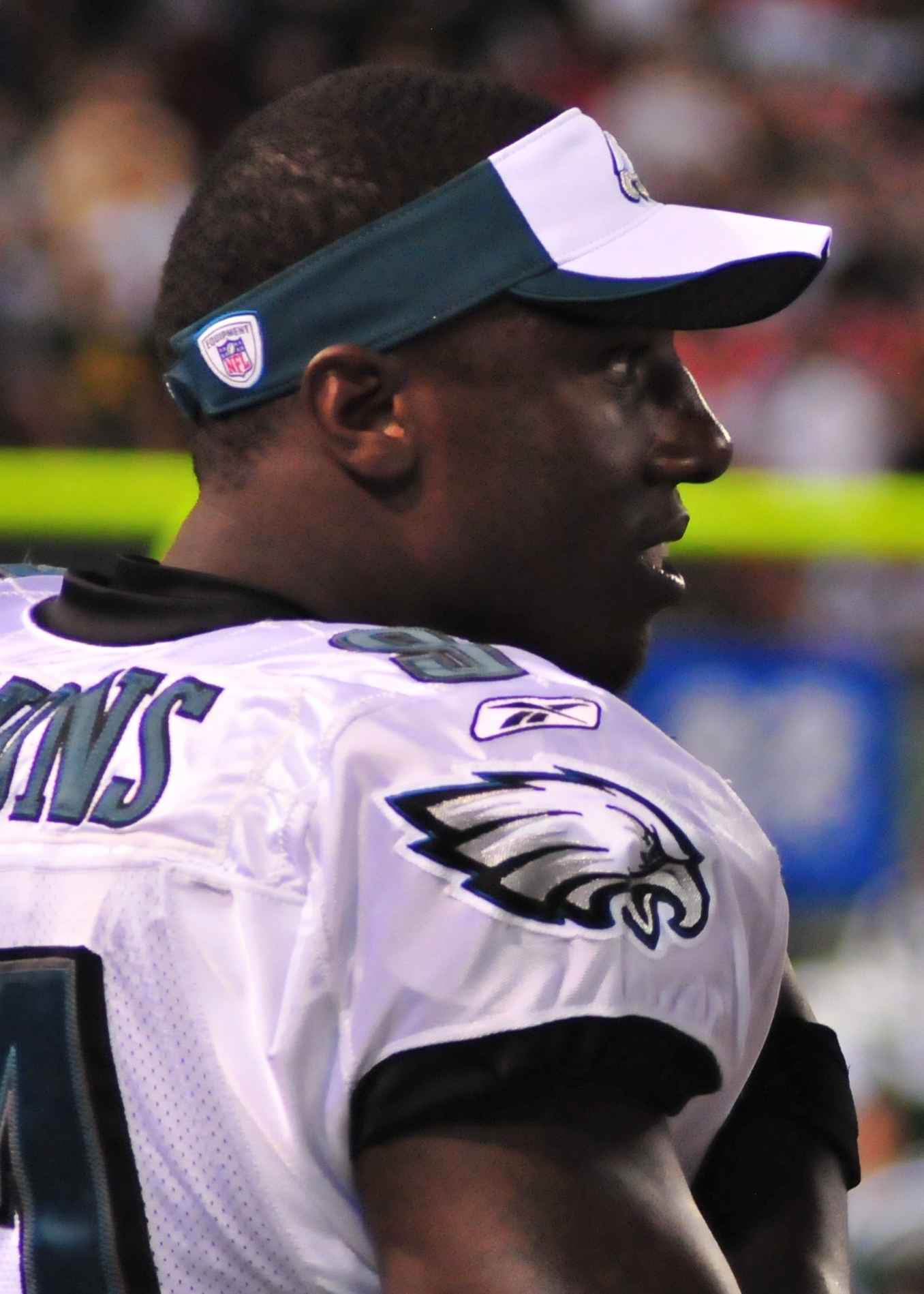
- Clemons with the Philadelphia Eagles in 2009

No. 57, 58, 91
- Position: Defensive end

Personal information
- Born: October 30, 1981 (age 45); Griffin, Georgia, U.S.
- Listed height: 6 ft 3 in (1.91 m)
- Listed weight: 255 lb (116 kg)

Career information
- High school: Griffin
- College: Georgia (1999–2002)
- NFL draft: 2003: undrafted

Career history
- Washington Redskins (2003); Cleveland Browns (2004)*; Washington Redskins (2004−2005); Oakland Raiders (2007); Philadelphia Eagles (2008–2009); Seattle Seahawks (2010–2013); Jacksonville Jaguars (2014–2015); Seattle Seahawks (2016)*
- * Offseason or practice squad member only

Awards and highlights
- Super Bowl champion (XLVIII)

Career NFL statistics
- Total tackles: 276
- Sacks: 69.0
- Forced fumbles: 20
- Fumble recoveries: 7
- Defensive touchdowns: 2
- Stats at Pro Football Reference

Christopher Clemons (born October 30, 1981) is an American former professional football player who was a defensive end in the National Football League (NFL). He played college football for the Georgia Bulldogs, and signed with the Washington Redskins as an undrafted free agent in 2003. Clemons also played in the NFL for the Oakland Raiders, Philadelphia Eagles, Seattle Seahawks, and Jacksonville Jaguars.

== Early life ==
Clemons attended Griffin High School in Griffin, Georgia, where he was a four-year letterman and three-year starter for the football team. He was named AAA-All Region first-team and nominated for Region MVP by the Georgia Athletic Coaches Association. He recorded 49 tackles, six sacks, two interceptions, one fumble recovery and one forced fumble his senior year, as well as rushed for 80 yards on ten carries and 12 receptions for 159 yards and three touchdowns. He was also a member of the track team.

== College career ==
Clemons was recruited by the University of Georgia in 1999. He started the 2000 season opener recording seven tackles, but then suffered a shoulder injury early in the season that sidelined him for several games. He played in 11 games in 2001, starting three of them. He played in 12 games with ten starts during his junior season, recording 53 tackles, and one sack. He was then named Most Improved Linebacker of 2002.

== Professional career ==
Pre-draft measurables
Height	Weight	Arm length	Hand span	40-yard dash	10-yard split	20-yard split	20-yard shuttle	Three-cone drill	Vertical jump	Broad jump	Bench press
6 ft 3 in (1.91 m)	236 lb (107 kg)	32 1/4 in (0.82 m)	9 1/2 in (0.24 m)	4.68 s	1.72 s	2.75 s	4.66 s	7.48 s	35.0 in (0.89 m)	9 ft 8 in (2.95 m)	18 reps
All values from NFL Combine

=== Washington Redskins (first stint) ===
After being undrafted in the 2003 NFL draft, Clemons signed with the Washington Redskins. However, he spent that entire season on injured reserve after suffering a torn ACL. He spent the 2004 training camp with the Redskins, but was released prior to the start of the regular season.

=== Cleveland Browns ===
Clemons was signed to the Cleveland Browns practice squad after being cut by the Redskins.

=== Washington Redskins (second stint) ===
He was re-signed to the Redskins' active roster on November 24, 2004, where he began to establish himself in the Redskins' defense, recording three sacks as a speed rusher late in the season. Clemons signed with the Washington Redskins again for the 2005 season where he played in 14 games and had eight tackles, two sacks, a blocked punt, and a forced fumble.

=== Oakland Raiders ===
Clemons played the 2007 season with the Oakland Raiders, primarily playing as a situational pass rusher before becoming a free agent.

=== Philadelphia Eagles ===
On March 1, 2008, Clemons signed a five-year contract with the Philadelphia Eagles. He is well known for stiff-arming of Tashard Choice on a fumble return touchdown in a playoff-clinching game versus the Dallas Cowboys on December 28, 2008, and body-slamming Tarvaris Jackson in the subsequent first-round playoff game.

=== Seattle Seahawks (first stint) ===
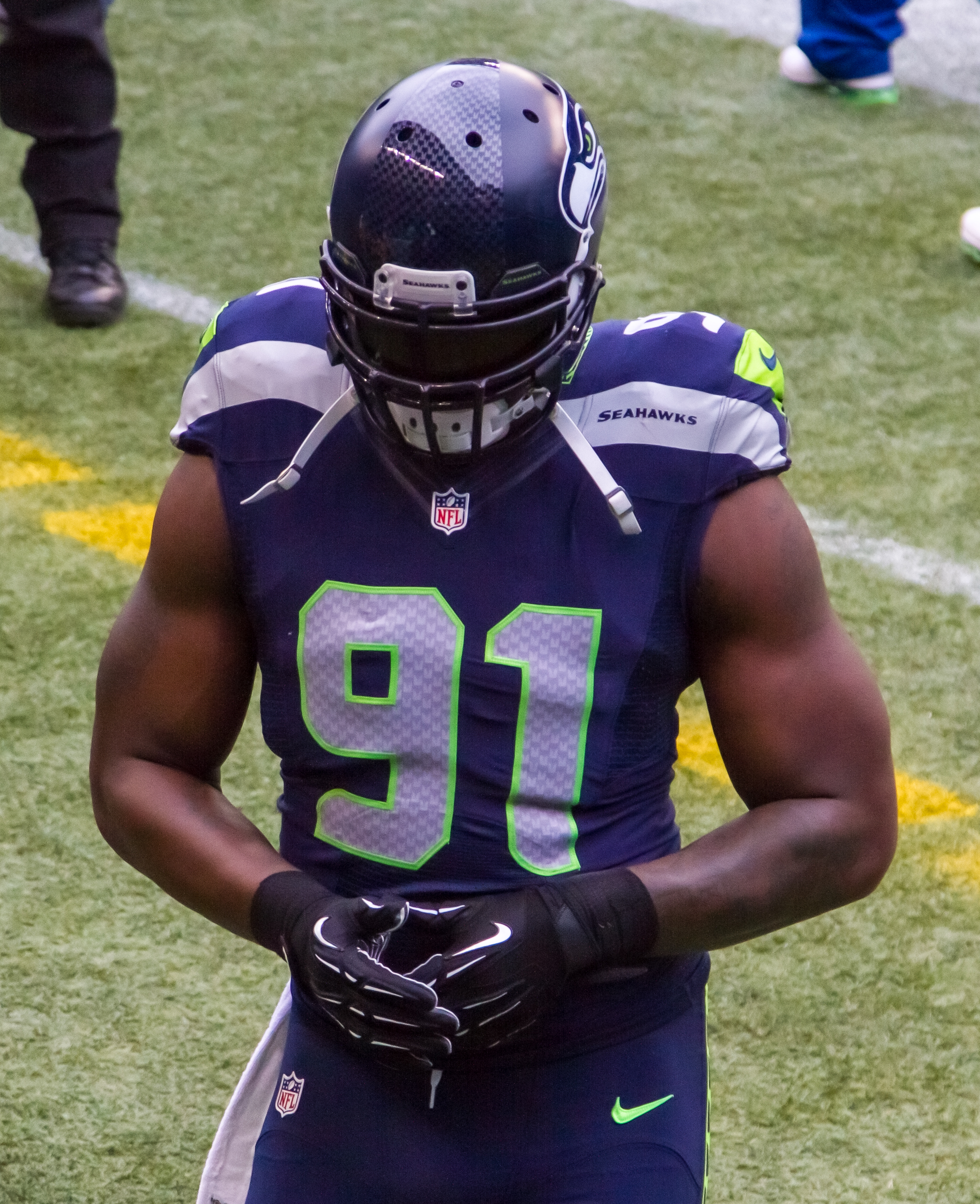
Clemons with the Seahawks in 2013

On March 16, 2010, Clemons was traded with a fourth round pick by the Eagles to the Seattle Seahawks in exchange for Darryl Tapp.

He was originally brought in to play the Leo position in Pete Carroll's defensive 4–3 over scheme, but with the injury of Red Bryant after Week 7, Raheem Brock was moved into his place and Clemons moved to starting left defensive end.

Clemons led the team with a career-high 11 sacks in both 2010 and 2011.

On September 24, 2012, Clemons recorded four sacks, all in the first half, in a victory over the Green Bay Packers.

On January 6, 2013, Clemons suffered a torn ACL in a 24-14 playoff victory over the Redskins. Clemons was later placed on injured reserve. On September 20, 2013, the Seahawks announced Clemons will play for his season debut in Week 3 against the Jacksonville Jaguars. Clemons and the Seahawks went on to win Super Bowl XLVIII that season.

On March 12, 2014, Clemons was released by the Seahawks.

=== Jacksonville Jaguars ===
On March 13, 2014, Clemons signed a four-year, $17.5 million contract with the Jacksonville Jaguars.

The Jaguars released Clemons on March 3, 2016.

=== Seattle Seahawks (second stint) ===
On April 1, 2016, Clemons agreed to terms in a deal to return to the Seahawks. On July 28, 2016, he informed the team that he planned to retire.

== NFL career statistics ==
Legend
	Led the league
**Bold**	Career high

=== Regular season ===
Year	Team	Games		Tackles					Interceptions					Fumbles			
Year	Team	GP	GS	Cmb	Solo	Ast	Sck	TFL	Int	Yds	TD	Lng	PD	FF	FR	Yds	TD
2004	WAS	6	0	7	7	0	3.0	2	0	0	0	0	1	1	0	0	0
2005	WAS	14	1	9	8	1	2.0	2	0	0	0	0	1	1	0	0	0
2007	OAK	**16**	2	20	15	5	8.0	7	0	0	0	0	1	2	1	0	0
2008	PHI	**16**	0	15	12	3	4.0	3	0	0	0	0	1	1	**2**	**73**	**1**
2009	PHI	**16**	0	11	8	3	3.0	3	0	0	0	0	1	0	0	0	0
2010	SEA	**16**	**16**	49	33	16	11.0	9	0	0	0	0	4	1	1	0	0
2011	SEA	**16**	**16**	**51**	**34**	**17**	11.0	**12**	0	0	0	0	**5**	3	0	0	0
2012	SEA	**16**	**16**	40	31	9	**11.5**	8	0	0	0	0	4	3	1	0	0
2013	SEA	14	11	24	12	12	4.5	4	0	0	0	0	2	3	0	0	0
2014	JAX	**16**	**16**	36	27	9	8.0	6	0	0	0	0	3	**4**	1	0	0
2015	JAX	**16**	8	14	13	1	3.0	5	0	0	0	0	1	1	1	6	**1**
		162	86	276	200	76	69.0	61	0	0	0	0	24	20	7	79	2

=== Playoffs ===
Year	Team	Games		Tackles					Interceptions					Fumbles			
Year	Team	GP	GS	Cmb	Solo	Ast	Sck	TFL	Int	Yds	TD	Lng	PD	FF	FR	Yds	TD
2008	PHI	**3**	0	3	3	0	0.0	0	0	0	0	0	**2**	0	0	0	0
2009	PHI	1	0	0	0	0	**1.0**	0	0	0	0	0	0	0	0	0	0
2010	SEA	2	2	6	5	1	**1.0**	**2**	0	0	0	0	**2**	0	0	0	0
2012	SEA	1	1	2	0	2	0.0	0	0	0	0	0	0	0	0	0	0
2013	SEA	**3**	**3**	**9**	**6**	**3**	**1.0**	1	0	0	0	0	1	**2**	0	0	0
		10	6	20	14	6	3.0	3	0	0	0	0	5	2	0	0	0
