= Internet – O Filme =

2017 film directed by Fillipo Capuzzi Lapietra

- Directed by: Fillipo Capuzzi Lapietra
- Written by: Rafinha Bastos; Dani Garutti; Mirna Nogueira
- Produced by: Sandi Adamiu; Márcio Fraccaroli; Rafinha Bastos
- Starring: Rafinha Bastos; Paulinho Serra; Felipe Castanhari; Patrícia dos Reis; Gustavo Stockler; Rafael Lange
- Production companies: Paris Produções; Elo Company; Televisa; Downtown Filmes
- Release date: February 23, 2017
- Country: Brazil
- Box office: R$ 4.9 million

Internet – O Filme is a Brazilian comedy film directed by Fillipo Capuzzi Lapietra, written by Rafinha Bastos, Dani Garutti and Mirna Nogueira, and starring several Brazilian YouTubers. Paris Filmes announced the release of the film on September 9, 2016, with trailers and posters. During the promotion, it was shown at Comic Con Experience. Internet – O Filme was released in theaters on February 23, 2017. Despite earning more than a million dollars and being one of the biggest box office hits in Brazil that year, the film received a negative reception from critics, especially about the plot and the acting.

== Plot ==
Uesley (Gustavo Stockler) is an arrogant Youtuber who only cares about his own popularity. He is the main YouTuber at an influencer event held in a hotel. After publishing a kiss between Mateus (Felipe Castanhari) and Natalia (Patrícia dos Reis) on his channel, Uesley accidentally makes their popularity soar, overshadowing his own. At the same time, three friends bet that, in exchange for a ticket to Los Angeles, Vepê (Lucas Olioti) will seduce Barbarinha (Priscilla Marinho). Two friends, Malu (Thaynara Oliveira Gomes) and Fabi (Gabi Lopes), arrive at the hotel without knowing the location of the YouTubers' convention. There's also Cesinha Passos (Rafinha Bastos), who has to deal with his bad reputation while getting along with Adalgamir (Paulinho Serra), a fan who starts working with him, and Paulinho (Rafael Lange), a Street Fighter professional who fancies himself as a Youtuber and tries not to be unmasked.

== Cast ==
- Rafinha Bastos as Cesinha Passos;
- Paulinho Serra as Adelgamir;
- Felipe Castanhari as Mateus;
- Patrícia dos Reis as Natália;
- Gustavo Stockler as Uesley;
- Rafael Lange as Paulinho;
- Christian Figueiredo as Tonio;
- Júlio Cocielo as Tito;
- Thaynara Oliveira Gomes as Malu;
- Lucas Olioti as Vepê;
- Victor Meyniel as Gabriel;
- Murilo Cervi as Cris;
- Gabriel Dantas as Humberto;
- Mauro Nakada as Nicolas;
- Cauê Moura as Robson;
- PC Siqueira as Joca;
- Maurício Meirelles as Saulo;
- Gabi Lopes as Fabi;
- Rodrigo Fernandes as Agente Smith;
- Igão Underground as Rafa;
- Willian Rodrigues as Levy;
- Micheli Machado as Laura;
- Metturo as Matteo;
- Polly Marinho as Barbarinha;
- Mr. Catra as God;
- Jefferson Barbosa as himself;
- Suellen Barbosa as herself;
- Whindersson Nunes as himself.

== Production ==
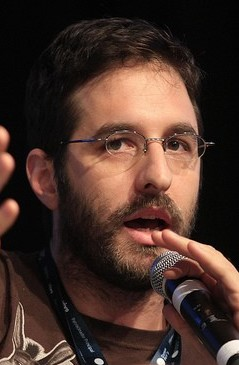
Besides acting, Rafinha Bastos was also one of the producers and screenwriters of the movie.

Internet - O Filme was directed by Fillipo Capuzzi Lapietra and produced by Sandi Adamiu, Márcio Fraccaroli and Rafinha Bastos. Renata Rezende was executive producer and Rafinha Bastos, Dani Garutti and Mirna Nogueira wrote the script. The concept of the movie involves portraying how the Internet has "changed the lives of the new generation". According to Rafinha, it would be the first movie "with Internet people, about the Internet, for the Internet audience". He also said that his focus was not adaptation, but "making cool stories". In order to fit the Internet into the film, the team modified the cuts, which resembled a vlog in parts.

Rafinha affirmed that the movie, financed entirely with his own money, is "much deeper than the title suggests". Since the beginning of the production, he pointed out that he didn't want to soften what was published on the Internet and that, if necessary, he could increase the rating.

The plot is divided into different stories that eventually intersect. According to Castanhari, one of Filippo's references would be Scott Pilgrim vs. the World, "a movie with a frenetic pace, with several conflicting stories". Rafinha said that his reference was Wild Tales, an Argentine production nominated in 2015 for the Oscar for Best International Feature Film.

Regarding the cast, Rafinha commented that it wasn't possible to include Lucas Lira and Luba, who were interested in participating, but no longer fit in with the plot. It was possible to include others, such as Lucas Inutilismo, Nyvi Estephan and Willian Rodrigues, but Rafinha said that their participation was minimal. Kéfera Buchmann, who was confirmed for the movie, left the cast due to scheduling reasons.

== Release ==
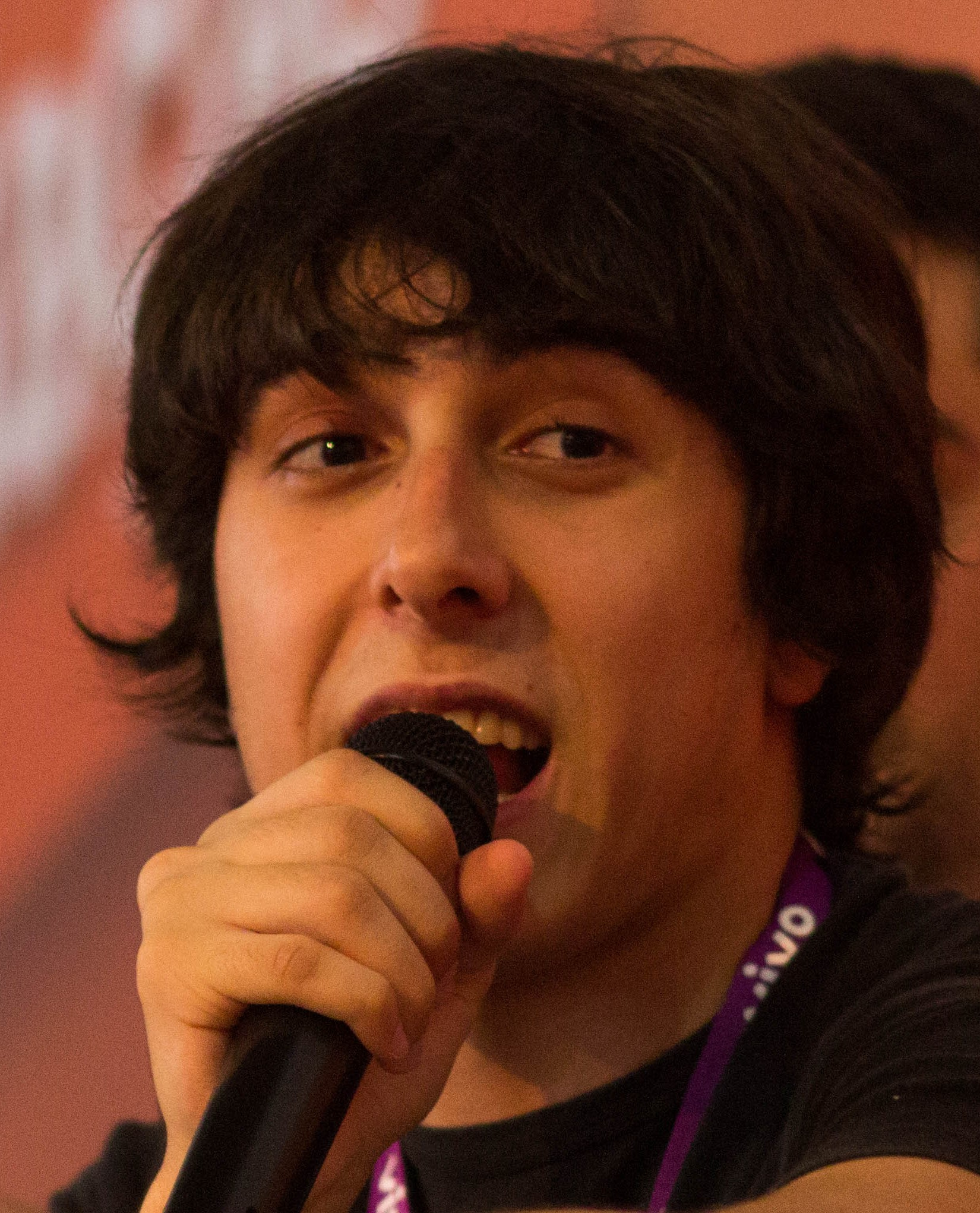
Felipe Castanhari in 2013.

On September 9, 2016, Paris Filmes confirmed the release of Internet - O Filme on its official Twitter account. The first teaser trailer, featuring Mr. Catra and Victor Meyniel, was released thirteen days later. On December 1, it was announced that the film, which had been scheduled for release on January 19 of the following year, had been postponed to February 23 to avoid coinciding with the release of Christian Figueiredo's Eu Fico Loko, set for January 12. The film was shown for the first time at the 2016 Comic Con Experience, held between December 1 and 4. On December 13, eight posters for the film were released. A longer official trailer was released on January 5, 2017.

Internet - O Filme was released on February 23 in 411 theaters. It was the fourth most watched movie in Brazilian cinemas on the Carnival holiday, with 106,000 spectators. By March 12, it had sold 366,230 tickets. According to the National Cinema Agency (Portuguese: Agência Nacional do Cinema - Ancine), the film was the 12th highest-grossing of the year, earning 4,915,838.38 reais and reaching an audience of 380,166 people. In June 2017, Internet - O Filme was released on Netflix, but was removed from the catalog on June 1, 2020.

== Reception ==
Professional ratings
Review scores
Source	Rating
AdoroCinema	1.5/5 stars
Almanaque Virtual	2/5 stars
Ccine10	2/5 stars
Cineweb	2/5 stars
Folha de S.Paulo	2/5 stars
Omelete	2/5 stars
Papo de Cinema	1/5 stars
Preview	1.5/5 stars

Overall, Internet - O Filme was received negatively by critics. Based on eight press reviews, AdoroCinema rated it an average of 1.8 out of 5. The fragmented plot was not well received. According to Ccine10, some of the narratives "never connect as would theoretically be ideal in this format. All these micro-stories aim to show the quest for fame at any cost, but almost all of them end up serving only as self-promotion for the participants." Cineweb commented that "the effort [...] to achieve cohesion and coherence with so many characters and stories that barely intersect is commendable." Omelete was slightly more positive, saying that the story was weak, "but it hides some technical care and one or two situations that generate genuine laughter." G1 stated that the story is "a good synthesis of the 'spirit' of the Internet."

The acting was criticized, and several critics attributed it to the cast not being composed of professional actors, but YouTubers. AdoroCinema commented that although some of them gave good performances, several "come across as apathetic or annoying". G1 said "YouTubers don't play themselves - and they are far from being good actors - but they try to win over movie audiences with the same tricks they use in their internet videos, each in their own way." The character Cesinha Passos, played by Rafinha Bastos, had a polarized reception. While Ccine10 stated that the character's story was the most annoying, Cineweb declared that it had "a little more to offer than the others". Regarding Mr. Catra's performance as God in the post-credits scene, Ccine10 said that it was the highlight of the production, while AdoroCinema claimed that it was one of the few times when the film stood out.

Some critics claimed that Internet - O Filme contains prejudices, including homophobia and fatphobia. Ccine10 commented that "the movie could follow an interesting path and play with stereotypes and make more intelligent jokes, but everything ends up turning into a mockery and, to a certain extent, offensive." Similarly, Preview said that "there are good, intelligent jokes, but they are overshadowed by the weak, sexist script". According to AdoroCinema, the "almost inexistence of blacks in the cast" stands out.

Almanaque Virtual stated that Internet - O Filme "has nothing to add, except the feeling of wasted time." Metrópoles concluded its analysis by claiming that the film "despises cinema". Folha de S. Paulo declared that the movie was "forgettable", and G1 said that it "even makes you laugh (sometimes), but you soon forget what you thought was funny." Papo de Cinema claimed that Rafinha "wasn't concerned with making a good movie".

== See also ==
- Cinema of Brazil
- Latin American cinema
- List of Brazilian films of the 2010s
