= Cellbit =

Brazilian streamer (born 1997)

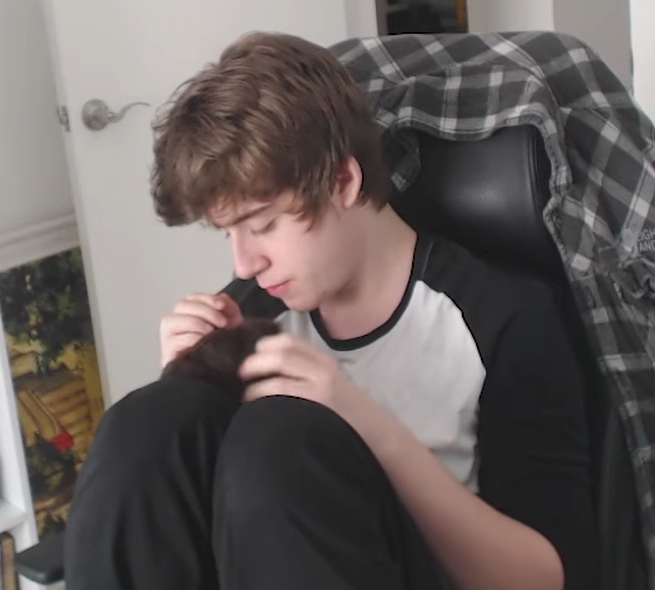
- Cellbit with his dog Eredin in 2017
- Born: Rafael Lange Severino; 11 February 1997 (age 29); Florianópolis, Santa Catarina, Brazil
- Other names: Cellbits, Cellbito, cellbão Gameplays, Rafael lages, Rafael Lanches, RafFofis, Rafinha, Rara, Kian (Secret identity)
- Occupations: Influencer, streamer, YouTuber, creative director
- Partner(s): Flávia Gato (2015–2017); Lorena Orsi (2022–present)
- Mother: Andréa Lange

Twitch information
- Channel: Cellbit
- Years active: 2018–present
- Genres: Comedy; Entertainment; Gaming
- Followers: 3.6 million

YouTube information
- Channels: Cellbit; Cellbit Lives
- Years active: 2012–present
- Genres: Comedy; Entertainment; Gaming
- Subscribers: 6.71 million (Cellbit); 3.02 million (CellbitLives)
- Views: 297.1 million (Cellbit); 897.5 million (CellbitLives)
- Last updated: October 2026

Rafael Lange Severino (Brazilian Portuguese: [ʁafaˈɛw ˈlɐ̃ɡi seveˈɾinu]; born 11 February 1997), known professionally as Cellbit (pronounced [ˈsɛwbitʃ(i)]), is a Brazilian creative director, digital influencer, YouTuber and streamer. He is known for creating and hosting the tabletop role-playing game series Ordem Paranormal on Twitch and for his early YouTube content focused on solving puzzle games, informally referred as "the enigma guy".

== Personal life ==
Rafael Lange Severino was born on 11 February 1997 in Florianópolis, Santa Catarina, but was raised in Carazinho, in Rio Grande do Sul from when he was three years old. He has two older brothers, Henrique and Felipe, and a cat named Mina, who died in 2017. His interest in puzzle games began at the age of nine years old, when his brother, Henrique, introduced to him the game Notpron, an online puzzle browser game known as "the hardest enigma on the internet". Henrique and Lange, in less than a year, were able to solve 139 out of the 140 levels available at the time, getting stuck on the last level for years. In 2016, Lange revealed in a YouTube video having anxiety disorder.

In February 2024, in a Twitter post, Lange revealed being asexual as well as having been through many situations of abuse and psychological trauma in his past relationships. He did this as a response towards, according to him, false, informal accusations of sexual abuse by his former girlfriend, Flávia Eloisa Gato, providing a detailed response, disputing the allegations and presenting a 19-page document addressing the claims. In the document, Lange addresses not only the most recent allegations, but also previous accusations of emotional abuse and relationship violence. According to Lange, his ex-girlfriend "had a pattern of manipulative behavior throughout the relationship". Lange then sued multiple people due to the publishing of 217 Internet posts that "objectively imputed false offenses [towards him]".

== Career ==
=== 2012–13: Beginning of his internet career ===
At the age of 15, Lange began posting videos on his second YouTube channel, CellBits, which was posteriously changed to Cellbit. By 2012, Cellbit had published machinima style Minecraft videos. Soon after, he kept his channel focused on Portal 2 gameplay. He later returned to Minecraft content, but with a different format. At the time, Cellbit and his family faced many financial hardships, specially considering his mother inability to work for the time being due to personal reasons.

=== 2014–16: Career peak ===
As of 2014, Lange began constantly posting gameplay videos of Garry's Mod. Later on, he stopped producing single games' gameplay content at all, focusing on playing random games in a saga format, such as Fugindo da Escola and the flash game Gênio Quiz. At the time, Cellbit was known online for his loud laughing and screaming, which many people saw as fake or forced.

As of 2016, he moved from the countryside to the city of São Paulo, simultaneously shifting his content, leaving gameplays aside to focus on more serious topics. During July 2016, he posted a video criticizing the Minecraft community in Brazil and was informally referred to as "YouTube's judge" due to the video's virality.

=== 2017: First role as an actor ===
In February, Lange debuted as an actor at the movie Internet – O Filme, taking the role of Paulinho, a Street Fighter player that hides under the identity of a YouTuber. As of July, Lange published his first video of the series "DO NOT BELIEVE HIS LIES", about the puzzle game with the same title. The game had a narrative of its own and was never completed by anyone, being discontinued in 2018. The YouTube series earned Lange the title "the enigma guy" online.

=== 2018–present: Career as a streamer and Ordem Paranormal ===
In 2018, Lange started constantly making live streamed content on Twitch. He got known quickly on the Brazilian Twitch community and became one of its most popular creators, reaching over 3.4 million followers on the platform.

In February 2020, Lange initiated his first RPG campaign called Ordem Paranormal RPG. During April of the same year, he created its second season, O Segredo na Floresta RPG. In October 2020, Lange announced the campaign of the third season of his RPG series by the name of "Desconjuração" and, along with it, a crowdfunding campaign for his game project Ordem Paranormal: Enigma do Medo or simply Enigma do Medo, made in partnership with the indie Brazilian game developer company Dumativa. The game was launched on 28 November 2024. The goal for the beginning of the production process was of R$500,000 in 60 days. The initial goal was reached in 5 hours of its launching on the platform Catarse. The crowdfunding got to its end at 846% of the initial goal, raising over R$4,000,000. In September 2021, Lange announced the fourth season of his RPG, called Calamidade. In November of the same year, he announced his first rulebook called Livro de Regras - Ordem Paranormal RPG.

In July 2022, Lange announced three new spinoff seasons of his main project, the first one being O Segredo na Ilha and was initiated a week after its announcement. Furthermore, it was announced that a comic would be made featuring the first season of Ordem Paranormal. In October 2022, the second spinoff season of Ordem Paranormal began, called Sinais do Outro Lado. On 23 September 2023, a special of Ordem Paranormal was announced: Ordem Paranormal: Quarentena, featuring international content creators such as Roier, Quackity, Baghera Jones and Foolish, as well as Brazilian creators, being the first season that reached international proportions, being later nominated for The Streamer Awards in the Best Streamed Series category.

In October 2025, Lange launched the last spinoff season of Ordem Paranormal called Hexatombe, featuring five killers from Natal Macabro, a previous three part special.

In February 2024, in a Twitter post, Lange revealed being asexual as well as having been through many situations of abuse and psychological trauma in his past relationships. He did this as a response towards, according to him, false, informal accusations of sexual abuse by his former girlfriend, Flávia Eloisa Gato, providing a detailed response, disputing the allegations and presenting a 19-page document addressing the claims. In the document, Lange addresses not only the most recent allegations, but also previous accusations of emotional abuse and relationship violence. According to Lange, his ex-girlfriend "had a pattern of manipulative behavior throughout the relationship". Lange then sued multiple people due to the publishing of 217 Internet posts that "objectively imputed false offenses [towards him]".

Since 2024, Lange has co-hosted Errou Rodou, an annual Oscar watch party livestream on Twitch alongside fellow streamers LJoga, Cinemagrath and MeiaUm, in which participants attempt to predict winners in each category.

== Filmography ==
=== Series ===
Year	Title	Role
2015	Herobrine: A Vingança	Balanar
2015	Herobrine: O Retorno	Balanar
2015	Fuga Impossível	Cell
2020–present	Ordem Paranormal	Cellbit
2023	QSMP	Cellbit

=== Cinema ===
Year	Title	Role
2017	Internet – O Filme	Paulinho

== Awards and nominations ==
Cellbit has accumulated 22.14 million hours of watch time in 2022, ranking ninth among the most-watched streamers and 44.45 million hours of watch time in 2023, ranking seventh, both lists according to Globo Esporte.

Year	Award	Category	Nomination	Result	Refs.
2022	MTV Millennial Awards Brasil	Streamer BR	Himself	Nominated	
2023	iBest Award	Gamer of the Year	Himself	Won	
2023	The Streamer Awards	Best International Streamer	Himself	Nominated	
2023	The Streamer Awards	Best Streamed Series	Ordem Paranormal: Quarentena	Nominated	
2026	The Game Awards	Content Creator of the Year	Himself	Pending	
