= Lindsay Czarniak =

American sports anchor and reporter

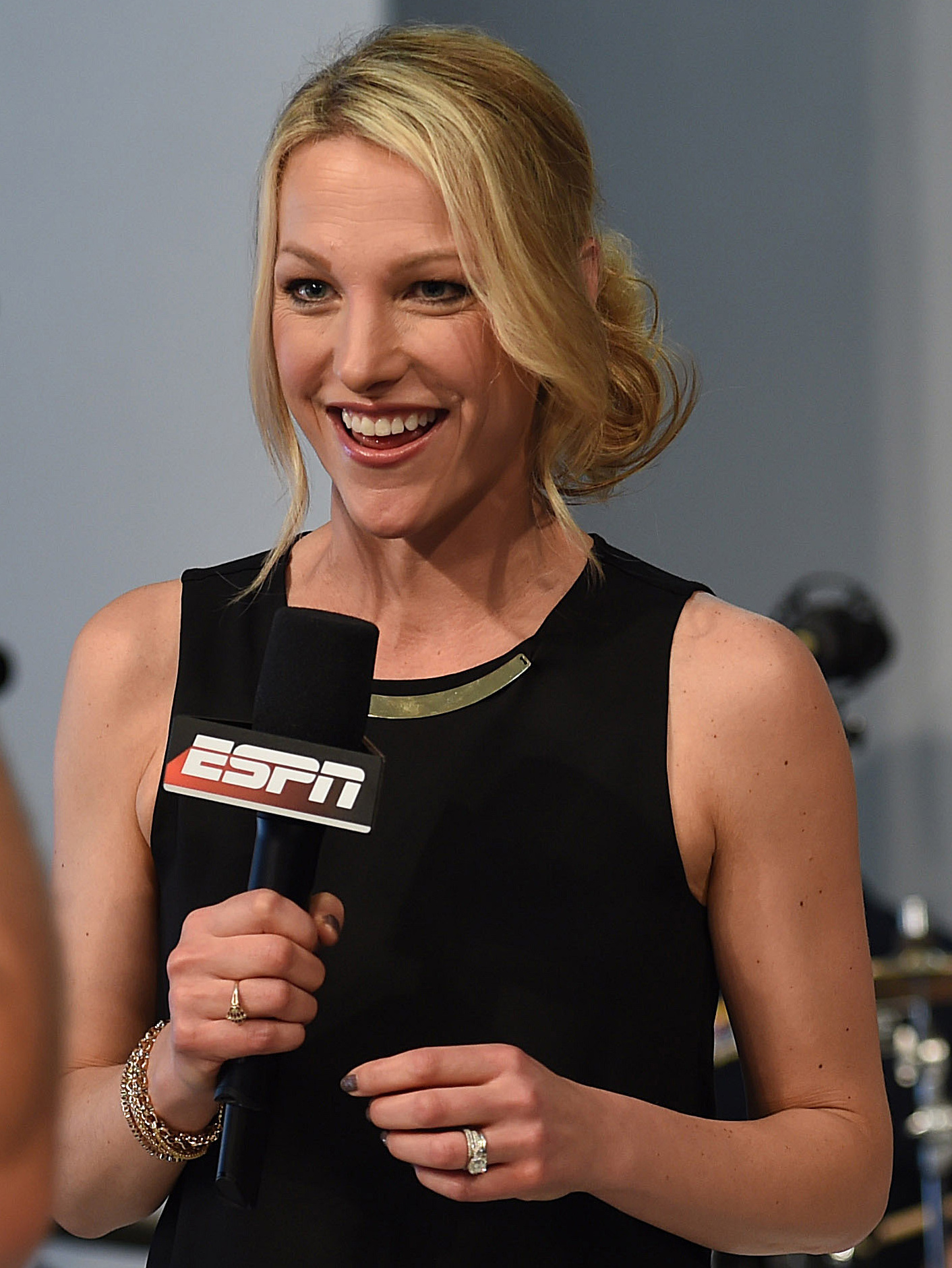
- Czarniak in 2015
- Born: Lindsay Ann Czarniak; 1977 or 1978 (age 48–49); Harrisburg, Pennsylvania, U.S.
- Education: James Madison University
- Occupation: Sports anchor and reporter
- Years active: 2000–present
- Notable credit(s): The George Michael Sports Machine co-host (2005-2007); WRC-TV sports anchor and reporter (2005-2011); ESPN sports anchor (2011-2017)
- Spouse: Craig Melvin (m. 2011)
- Children: 2

Lindsay Ann Czarniak (born 1977 or 1978) is an American sports anchor and reporter who works for CBS Sports as a host for CBS Sports HQ. She formerly worked for Fox Sports as a sideline reporter for NFL games. After spending six years with WRC-TV, the NBC owned-and-operated station in Washington, D.C., Czarniak joined ESPN as a SportsCenter anchor in August 2011 and left ESPN in 2017. She is of Polish descent.

She has also been a pit reporter and studio host for TNT's NASCAR Sprint Cup Series coverage and a former co-host and reporter for the syndicated The George Michael Sports Machine. Czarniak served as a host and sportsdesk reporter for NBC Sports coverage of the 2008 Summer Olympics in Beijing, China.

== Biography ==
=== Early life ===
Lindsay Czarniak was born in Harrisburg, Pennsylvania. Her father, Chet Czarniak, spent 17 years working in a local newspaper's sports department. Growing up a sports fan, she played lacrosse and field hockey at Centreville High School in Virginia. In 2000, she graduated from James Madison University with a major in online journalism. She was a member of the sorority Sigma Kappa.

=== Career ===
Czarniak started out as an intern for WUSA in Washington, D.C., while still a college student. Her broadcasting career began as a CNN production assistant. Her first on-air role as a news reporter occurred while working for WAWS in Jacksonville, Florida. She also worked for WTEV-TV (also in Jacksonville), WTVJ in Miami, Florida, and the Speed Channel.

In June 2005, Czarniak returned to the D.C. area and joined WRC-TV after she had received a phone call from George Michael to work as a sports anchor and reporter. She officially became the co-host of The George Michael Sports Machine in September 2006. In her first major assignment as a reporter, Czarniak traveled to Turin, Italy to relay coverage of the 2006 Winter Olympics for NBC Sports. She has also served as a pit reporter in NASCAR Nationwide Series races at the Martinsville Speedway and at the IRP Busch race.

In March 2007, George Michael stepped down as WRC-TV's sports anchor. Czarniak and her colleague, Dan Hellie, then became the co-sports anchors. She was also tapped as a pit reporter for TNT's six-race Sprint Cup Series schedule from Pocono to Chicago. She remained with TNT for the same schedule in 2008.

Following the murder of free safety Sean Taylor in November 2007, Czarniak was the first sports reporter to interview team players of the Washington Redskins.

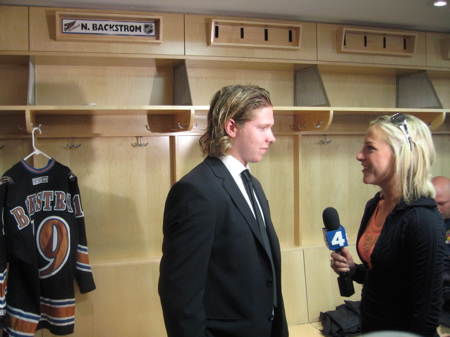
Czarniak interviews Nicklas Bäckström at the press conference announcing his signing

Czarniak made a guest appearance on the edition of May 22, 2008, of The Tony Kornheiser Show, occupying the "chick chair." On that show, she told a humorous anecdote of being arrested for expired license plates by the DC Police on her way to a News 4 interview, which turned out to be an important public service warning for those who visit Washington, D.C.

On July 17, 2008, Czarniak was honored at the Reading Phillies at Bowie Baysox doubleheader where she threw the first pitch. Czarniak also signed autographs during a meet and greet session throughout the games. Initially, Lindsay Czarniak Day was set to take place on July 21, but was changed due to a scheduling conflict. Fans at either the July 17 and the July 21 games received Lindsay Czarniak bobble heads.

On July 29, Czarniak posted one of several blogs just before leaving for her 2008 Summer Olympics duties in Beijing, China. She was a sportsdesk reporter for NBC. She also sent in blogs to the Olympics section of WRC-TV's website. Another one of her duties was hosting a half-hour show on Oxygen called Gymnastics on Oxygen. It was largely based around gymnastics and other Olympic competitions targeted toward women. It aired weekdays at 7:30 pm ET.

On June 23, 2011, it was announced that Czarniak would leave WRC-TV to work at ESPN. On July 13, 2011, Czarniak made her final broadcast as a sports reporter at WRC-TV. On August 19, 2011, Czarniak made her SportsCenter debut covering the evening's preseason football games. In December 2012, she took the place of Jay Harris as co-host of the 6 pm SportsCenter after Harris moved to the 11 pm SportsCenter.

On April 24, 2013, ESPN/ABC revealed that Czarniak would be replacing Brent Musburger as the host of ABC's coverage of the 2013 Indianapolis 500. She became the first woman to ever host the telecast. She succeeded Musburger as well as previous hosts and broadcast legends Jim McKay, Keith Jackson, Paul Page, and Al Michaels. In August 2017, her contract with ESPN expired.

On February 12, 2018, Joe Gibbs Racing announced that Czarniak would be joining their professional stock car racing team. She would be producing digital content during the Daytona 500 along with features on each of the team's four Monster Energy Cup Series racers. Later that summer, she became one of the four presenters of the Netflix reality competition show Hyperdrive, which would be released in August 2019.

On February 5, 2019, Czarniak signed with Fox Sports as a studio host for their NASCAR coverage, and as a sideline reporter for Fox’s NFL coverage.

In February 2026, Czarniak joined NBC Sports coverage of the Olympic Games, serving as one of the hosts for NBC’s presentation of the 2026 Milan Cortina Winter Olympics. In August 2026 Czarniak's husband, Craig Melvin, announced that Czarniak had been hired by CBS Sports as a host for the streaming channel CBS Sports HQ.

== Personal life ==
Czarniak's parents are Chet and Terri. Chet worked for the sports department at a Washington, D.C.-based newspaper for 17 years before becoming the current managing editor of usatoday.com. Terri is a former principal at Rose Hill Elementary School, a Fairfax County public school, in Alexandria, Virginia. Czarniak's brother, Andrew, is a 2005 graduate of the United States Coast Guard Academy. He is currently serving in the U.S. Coast Guard.

Czarniak appeared in the 2000 independent action film Aquarius, in which she played a character named Mist. In 2009, Czarniak made a cameo appearance in the indie film Ghosts Don't Exist from executive producer Chris Cooley.

Czarniak married WRC-TV reporter and weekend anchor Craig Melvin on October 15, 2011, in Washington. He is currently the host of Today and a co-host of Today Third Hour. Czarniak gave birth to their first son in March 2014. On June 16, 2016, Czarniak announced that she was pregnant again on SportsCenter before that night's Game 6 of the 2016 NBA Finals in Cleveland. She gave birth to her second child, a daughter, in November 2016.
