= List of Brazilian films of 2017 =

The following is a list of Brazilian films released in 2017.

== January – March ==
| Opening | | Title | Director | Cast | Genre | Notes | Ref. |
|---|---|---|---|---|---|---|---|
| J A N U A R Y | 12 | Eu Fico Loko | Bruno Garotti | Filipe Bragança, José Victor Pires, Michel Joelsas, Thomaz Costa, Giovanna Grigio, Isabela Moreira | Comedy | | |
| J A N U A R Y | 19 | Axé: Canto do Povo de Algum Lugar | Chico Kertész | | Documentary | | |
| J A N U A R Y | 19 | Saltimbancos Trapalhões | João Daniel Tikhomiroff | Renato Aragão, Dedé Santana, Letícia Colin, Emilio Dantas, Roberto Guilherme, Marcos Frota, Alinne Moraes | Comedy | | |
| J A N U A R Y | 19 | Os Penetras 2 – Quem dá Mais? | Andrucha Waddington | Eduardo Sterblitch, Marcelo Adnet, Mariana Ximenes, Stepan Nercessian, Danton Melo | Comedy | | |
| F E B R U A R Y | 2 | TOC – Transtornada Obsessiva Compulsiva | Teodoro Poppovic, Paulinho Caruso | Tatá Werneck, Bruno Gagliasso, Vera Holtz, Daniel Furlan, Luis Lobianco | Comedy | | |
| F E B R U A R Y | 2 | Clarisse ou Alguma Coisa Sobre Nós Dois | Petrus Cariry | Sabrina Greve, David Wendefilm, Tabata Nery, Débora Ingrid, Veronica Cavalcanti, Everaldo Pontes | Drama | | |
| F E B R U A R Y | 9 | Redemoinho | José Luiz Villamarim | | Drama | | |
| F E B R U A R Y | 9 | A Cidade Onde Envelheço | Marília Rocha | Francisca Manuel, Jonnata Doll, Elizabete Francisca, Wanderson Dos Santos, Paulo Nazareth | Drama | | |
| F E B R U A R Y | 23 | Internet – O Filme | Filippo Capuzzi | Rafinha Bastos, Christian Figueiredo, Mr. Catra | Comedy | | |
| F E B R U A R Y | 23 | GadgetGang in Outer Space | Ale McHaddo | Danilo Gentili, Maisa Silva, Rogério Morgado, Guilherme Briggs | Animated | | |
| M A R C H | 2 | Waiting for B. | Paulo Cesar Toledo, Abigail Spindel | | Documentary | | |
| M A R C H | 9 | Olhar instigado | Chico Gomes, Felipe Lion | | Documentary | | |
| M A R C H | 9 | O crime da Gávea | André Warwar | Ricardo Duque, Simone Spoladore, Roberto Birindelli, Celso Taddei, Aline Fanju | Drama | | |
| M A R C H | 16 | Era o Hotel Cambridge | Eliane Caffé | Isam Ahmad Issa, Carmen Silva, José Dumont, Suely Franco | Drama | | |
| M A R C H | 16 | La vingança | Fernando Fraiha, Jiddu Pinheiro | Daniel Furlan, Leandra Leal, Adrián Navarro | Comedy | Brazil-Argentina co-production | |
| M A R C H | 16 | Pedro Osmar, prá liberdade que se conquista | Eduardo Consonni, Rodrigo T. Marques | | Documentary | | |
| M A R C H | 16 | Com os punhos cerrados | Ricardo Pretti, Pedro Diógenes, Luiz Pretti | Ricardo Pretti, Luiz Pretti, Pedro Diógenes, Samya De Lavor, Uirá dos Reis, Rodrigo Capistrano | Drama | | |
| M A R C H | 16 | Por um punhado de dólares - os novos emigrados | Leonardo Dourado | | Documentary | | |
| M A R C H | 16 | Jonas e o circo sem lona | Paula Gomes | | Documentary | | |
| M A R C H | 16 | Estopô Balaio | Cristiano Burlan | | Documentary | | |
| M A R C H | 23 | Sinais de cinza, a peleja de Olney contra o dragão da maldade | Henrique Dantas | | Documentary | | |
| M A R C H | 23 | Jovem aos 50 - A história de meio século da Jovem Guarda | Sérgio Baldassarini Júnior | | Documentary | | |
| M A R C H | 23 | Travessia | João Gabriel | Chico Diaz, Caio Castro, Camilla Camargo, Caco Monteiro | Drama | | |
| M A R C H | 23 | Todas as cores da noite | Pedro Severien | Sabrina Greve, Brenda Lígia, Sandra Possani | Drama | | |
| M A R C H | 30 | A Glória e a Graça | Flávio R. Tambellini | Carolina Ferraz, Sandra Corveloni, Carol Marra | Drama | | |
| M A R C H | 30 | Guerra do Paraguay | Luiz Rosemberg Filho | | Historical drama | | |
| M A R C H | 30 | Galeria F | Emília Silveira | | Documentary | | |
| M A R C H | 30 | Memória em Verde e Rosa | Pedro von Krüger | | Documentary | | |
| M A R C H | 30 | Eu te levo | Marcelo Müller | Anderson Di Rizzi, Giovanni Gallo, Rosi Campos | Drama | | |
| M A R C H | 30 | The Ornithologist | João Pedro Rodrigues | Paul Hamy, João Pedro Rodrigues, Han Wen | Drama | Brazil-France-Portugal co-production | |

== April – June ==
| Opening | | Title | Director | Cast | Genre | Notes | Ref. |
|---|---|---|---|---|---|---|---|
| A P R I L | 6 | Pitanga | Beto Brant, Camila Pitanga | | Documentary | | |
| A P R I L | 6 | Dolores | Juan Dickinson | Emilia Attías, Guillermo Pfening, Roberto Birindelli | Drama | Brazil-Argentina co-production | |
| A P R I L | 6 | Todas as manhãs do mundo | Lawrence Wahba, Tatiana Lohmann | | Documentary | | |
| A P R I L | 6 | Por Trás do Céu | Caio Sóh | Nathalia Dill, Emílio Orciollo Neto, Renato Góes | Drama | | |
| A P R I L | 13 | Martírio | Vincent Carelli, Ernesto de Carvalho, Tita | | Documentary | | |
| A P R I L | 13 | A Família Dionti | Alan Minas | | Drama | | |
| A P R I L | 20 | Joaquim | Marcelo Gomes | Julio Machado, Isabél Zuaa, Nuno Lopes, Rômulo Braga, Welket Bungué, Karay Rya Pua | Biography | Brazil-Portugal co-production; winner of Best Film & Best Director at 19th Havana Film Festival New York | |
| A P R I L | 20 | Gostosas, Lindas e Sexies | Ernani Nunes | Carolinie Figueiredo, Cacau Protásio, Mariana Xavier, Lyv Ziese | Comedy | | |
| A P R I L | 27 | Elon Não Acredita na Morte | Ricardo Alves Jr. | Rômulo Braga, Clara Choveaux, Germano Melo | Drama | | |
| A P R I L | 27 | Vermelho Russo | Charly Braun | Maria Manoella, Martha Nowill, Michel Melamed | Drama | Brazil-Portugal-Russia co-production | |
| A P R I L | 27 | Mais Do Que Eu Possa Me Reconhecer | Allan Ribeiro | | Documentary | | |
| M A Y | 4 | Ninguém Entra Ninguém Sai | Hsu Chien | Letícia Lima, Paulinho Serra, Danielle Winits, Mariana Santos | Comedy | | |
| M A Y | 11 | Taego Ãwa | Henrique Borela, Marcela Borela | | Documentary | | |
| M A Y | 11 | Crônica da Demolição | Eduardo Ades | | Documentary | | |
| M A Y | 18 | Um Casamento | Mônica Simões | | Documentary | | |
| M A Y | 18 | O Rastro | J. C. Feyer | Rafael Cardoso, Leandra Leal, Natália Guedes, Cláudia Abreu, Jonas Bloch | Thriller | | |
| M A Y | 25 | Muito romântico | Melissa Dullius, Gustavo Jahn | Gustavo Jahn, Melissa Dullius, Gustavo Beck | Romance | | |
| M A Y | 25 | Comeback | Erico Rassi | Nelson Xavier | Drama | | |
| M A Y | 25 | Real: O Plano por Trás da História | Rodrigo Bittencourt | Emílio Orciollo Neto, Bemvindo Sequeira, Norival Rizzo, Tato Gabus Mendes | Drama | | |
| J U N E | 1 | Amor.com | Anita Barbosa | Isis Valverde, Gil Coelho, Joaquim Lopes, João Côrtes, Carol Portes, Alexandra Richter, Marcos Mion | Comedy | | |
| J U N E | 1 | O Jardim das Aflições | Josias Teófilo | | Documentary | | |
| J U N E | 8 | Nunca Me Sonharam | Cacau Rhoden | | Documentary | | |
| J U N E | 8 | Bach in Brazil | Ansgar Ahlers | Edgar Selge, Pablo Vinicius, Aldri Anunciação, Franziska Walser | Drama | Brazil-Germany co-production | |
| J U N E | 8 | Café - Um Dedo de Prosa | Maurício Squarisi | Lu Haihua, Liu Fangyu, Gao Fa | Animation | | |
| J U N E | 8 | Animal Político | Tião | Rodrigo Bolzan | Drama | | |
| J U N E | 15 | Quem É Primavera das Neves | Ana Luiza Azevedo, Jorge Furtado | | Documentary | | |
| J U N E | 15 | Um Tio Quase Perfeito | Pedro Antônio | Marcus Majella, Ana Lucia Torre, Letícia Isnard | Comedy | | |
| J U N E | 15 | Sepultura Endurance | Otavio Juliano | | Documentary | | |
| J U N E | 15 | A Terra Vermelha | Diego Martinez Vignatti | Geert Van Rampelberg, Eugenia Ramírez, Alexandros Potamianos, Jorge Aranda | Drama | Brazil-Belgium-Argentina co-production | |
| J U N E | 15 | Os Transgressores | Luis Erlanger | | Documentary | | |
| J U N E | 22 | Divórcio | Pedro Amorim | Camila Morgado, Murilo Benício, Luciana Paes | Comedy | | |
| J U N E | 22 | Divinas divas | Leandra Leal | | Documentary | | |
| J U N E | 22 | Mulher do Pai | Cristiane Oliveira | Maria Galant, Marat Descartes, Veronica Perrotta | Drama | Brazil-Uruguay co-production | |
| J U N E | 22 | Meus 15 Anos | Mauricio Eça | Larissa Manoela, Rafael Infante, Daniel Botelho | Comedy | | |
| J U N E | 29 | Introdução à Música do Sangue | Luiz Carlos Lacerda | Ney Latorraca, Bete Mendes, Armando Babaioff | Drama | | |
| J U N E | 29 | Danado de Bom | Debby Brennand | | Documentary | | |
| J U N E | 29 | Mar Inquieto | Fernando Mantelli | Rita Guedes, Daniel Bastreghi, Aurea Baptista | Drama | | |

== See also ==
- 2017 in Brazil
