= Gabi Lopes =

Brazilian actress and model (born 1994)

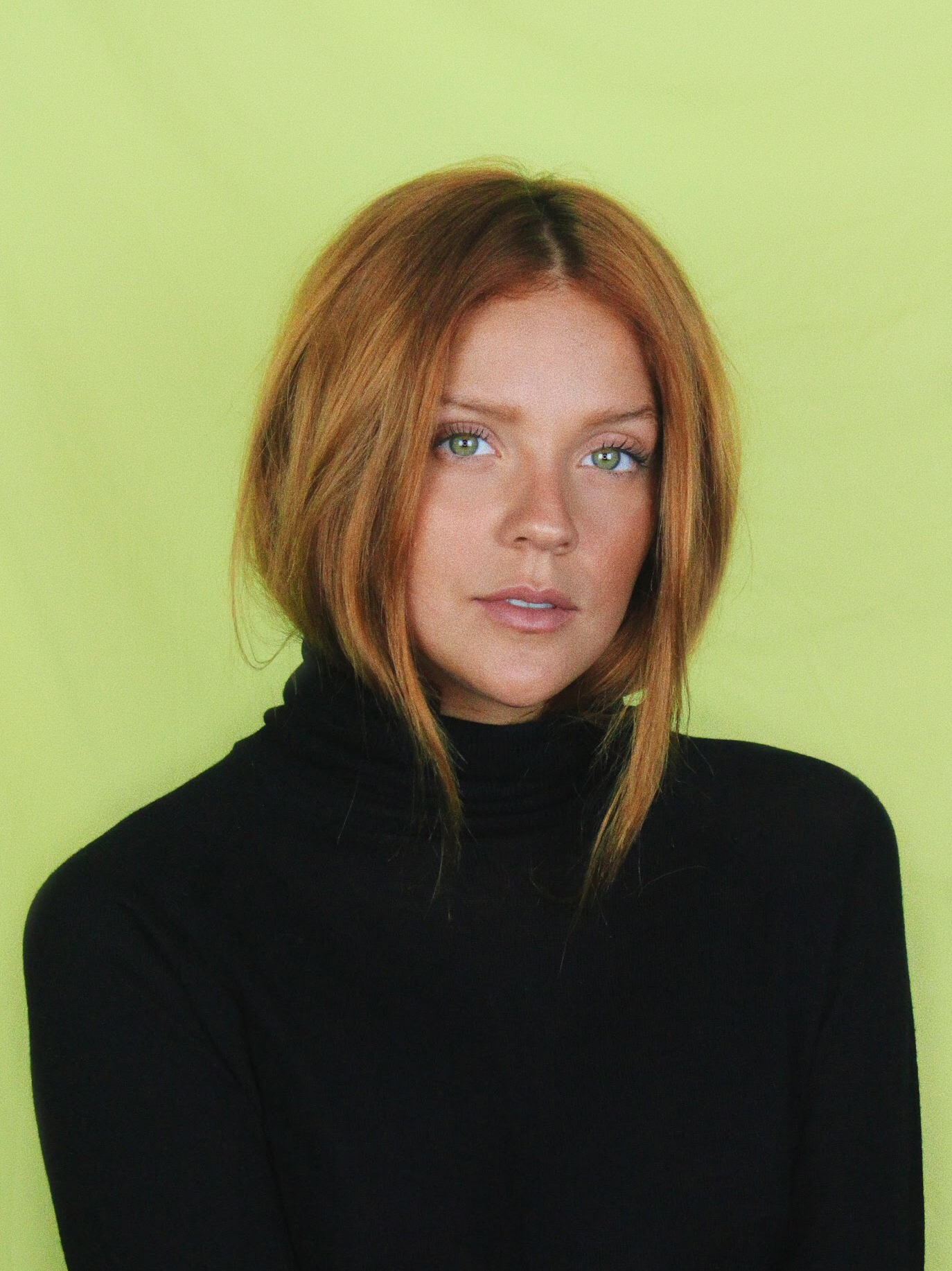
- Born: Gabriela Lopes Gabriel; July 23, 1994 (age 32); São Paulo, São Paulo Brazil
- Occupations: Actress; model
- Years active: 2003–present (actress)
- Website: gabilopes.com.br

Gabriela Lopes Gabriel (born July 23, 1994, in São Paulo) is a Brazilian actress and model. She became famous nationally after her role in the 22nd season of TV series Malhação, at Rede Globo.

== Biography ==
Gabi has been working as an actress for 15 years. She started in TV at age 8, in 2002, when she hosted the Children's Day Special at SBT alongside famous Brazilian TV hostess Hebe Camargo. Throughout her career she has acted in many TV series: Entre Teens, at MTV, Julie e Os Fantasmas at Rede Band and Nickelodeon, miniseries Queridos Amigos at Rede Globo, Segredos Médicos at Multishow, Na Mira do Crime at FOX, FX and TV Record, Casos de Ocorrência also at Multishow, with Rafinha Bastos, and the award-winning series Saidera at Rede Globo, in the role of Carolina. She was cast in the 22nd season of Malhação Sonhos at Rede Globo, as the homosexual fighter Pri.

She started her career in cinema when she was 12 years old, in the role of Maria, the blind protagonist of short film Por um Sopro de Vida. Soon after came the movies Os Castelos Não São Eternos, Eu e Meu Guarda Chuva, and Casa dos Sonhos Esquecidos. TV series Na Mira do Crime was also made into a TV movie, which was shown at FOX, FX and Rede Record. In 2016 she starred in two movies: Vende-se Ilusões and Solteira Quase Surtando. In 2017 it was time for O Último Virgem, a teenage comedy in which Gabi played the role of the most dashing girl in class. She was also Fabi in Internet O Filme, a big production of Paris Filmes for which more than 25 TV and web celebrities were cast. In that same year, Gabi got the main part for the first time in a feature film called VIEW, about a YouTuber who is kidnapped and held hostage. This movie landed her her first international award: First Glance Film Festival Los Angeles, as Best Actress. The film also won in the Best Movie category. Still in 2017, she was seen in Amor Sem Fronteiras, as Paula, the daughter of Joana (Luana Piovani) and Pedro (Paulo Tiefentaler), a coproduction of Brazil and Argentina which is scheduled to be released in 2018. She got her hair painted brunette for the role of Isis, in movie Casa de Cléo, a drama in which the character loses her mother.

== Career ==
In advertisement, Gabi's career started at 8 years old. She was cast in commercials and campaigns for many national brands, such as Speedy Telefônica, O Boticário, Decathlon, Olympikus, Renner, Vivo, Carrefour (with Ana Maria Braga) and Volkswagen. She was also studying theatre during this time. In 2010 she participated in web series and other projects for Forma Turismo. She became a TV hostess for four different programs of Brazilian channel PlayTV, interviewing Kelly Key, Wanessa Camargo and NX Zero in "Combo Fala + Joga". She later joined the Nickelodeon team as a reporter for Patrulha Nick and Nickers. She starred many TV series and music videos, her first being "Cedo ou Tarde" of NX Zero. Nowadays, she has worked in over 35 music videos, of artists such as Anitta, Lucas Lucco, Luan Santana, MC Guime, Nego do Borel, Fernando e Sorocaba, Bruninho e Davi, Munhoz e Mariano, Vintage Culture, among others. For two and a half years she was part of a national project for which she travelled to all Brazilian states, talking about dreams and career building for actors. After Malhação, Gabi got back to theater work, as producer and the main character of a play called "Ladrões de Estrelas", released first in Fortaleza.

Today, she is part of the team of Nosso Canal, a YouTube channel with over 1 million subscribers, apart from her own channel, where she shares her lifestyle and trips around the world. She is an ambassador of brands such as Reebok, Aussie, Samsung, IE Intercambio and Chilli Beans.

In 2016 she founded the video production company Young Republic with movie director Daniel Tupinambá. After just two years in the market, the company has produced over 4 movies and many music videos and ads for brands like Ferrero Rocher, Nutella, Gilette, Aussie, Anhembi Morumbi and others. The production of the YouTube channel is made through the company by the actress herself.

== Filmography ==
=== Television ===
Year	Title	Character	Channel
2005	Hebe Camargo Talk Show	special guest	SBT
2006	Disparada	television host	PlayTV
2006	Combo Fala + Joga	television host	PlayTV
2006	Play Zone	television host	PlayTV
2006	Cine Play	television host	PlayTV
2008	Patrulha Nick	reporter	Nickelodeon
2009	Nickers	reporter	Nickelodeon
2010	Entre Teens	Aline	MTV
2012	Julie e os Fantasmas	Robbie	Nickelodeon
2013	Segredos Médicos	Bia	Multishow
2014	Na Mira do Crime	Bianca	FOX
2014	Malhação Sonhos	Pri	Rede Globo
2015	Casos de Ocorrência	Jessica	Multishow
2016	Saideira	Carolina	Rede Globo

=== Cinema ===
Year	Title	Character
2008	Os Castelos Não São Eternos	Fernanda
2011	Por Um Sopro de Vida	Maria
2012	Eu e Meu Guarda Chuva	Julia
2014	Casa dos Sonhos Esquecidos	Madame Rosê
2014	Na Mira do Crime O Filme	Bianca
2015	O Último Virgem	Bia
2015	Vende-se Ilusões	Gabi
2016	Free Way	Claudia
2016	Solteira Quase Surtando	Blogueira
2016	Internet - O Filme	Fabi
2020	A menina que matou os pais	Carol
2020	O menino que matou meus pais	Carol

=== Theater ===
Year	Title	Character
2003	Parece Mas Não É	Bruna
2004	Babel	Rainha
2012	Angel City	Lanx
2013	Princesas Disney	Cinderela
2015	Ladrões de Estrelas	Violeta

=== Music videos ===
Year	Title	Artist
2009	Antes de Dormir	4LIVE
2010	Tarde Demais	Garnet
2010	Anjos Normais	Kamy
2011	Cedo ou Tarde	Nx Zero
2012	Princesinha	Lucas Lucco
2013	Livre	Fernando e Sorocaba
2013	Bela e a Fera	Munhoz e Mariano
2015	Perto de Mim	Aruandah
2015	Gump	D Lukka
2015	Swag	Yudi Tamashiro
2015	Don't Wanna Touchdown feat Polina	Johny Gloovez
2015	Viver por Viver	Kim Lirio
2015	Dois Amores	Vitor Kley
2015	Eu Vim Pra Ficar	Mc Guime
2015	Casa Nova	Jhama
2015	Rio California	Rafael Almeida
2015	Beija-Flor Me Beija	Bruninho e Davi
2016	Depois Das 3	Bruninho e Davi
2016	A Mesma Lua	Bruninho e Davi
2016	Hollywood	Vintage Culture
2016	Hoje Eu Accordei feat. Joey Mattos	Pollo
2016	Delícia	Tribo Cordel
2016	Surrender	Davi Cartaxo
