= PC Siqueira =

Brazilian YouTuber and presenter (1986–2023)

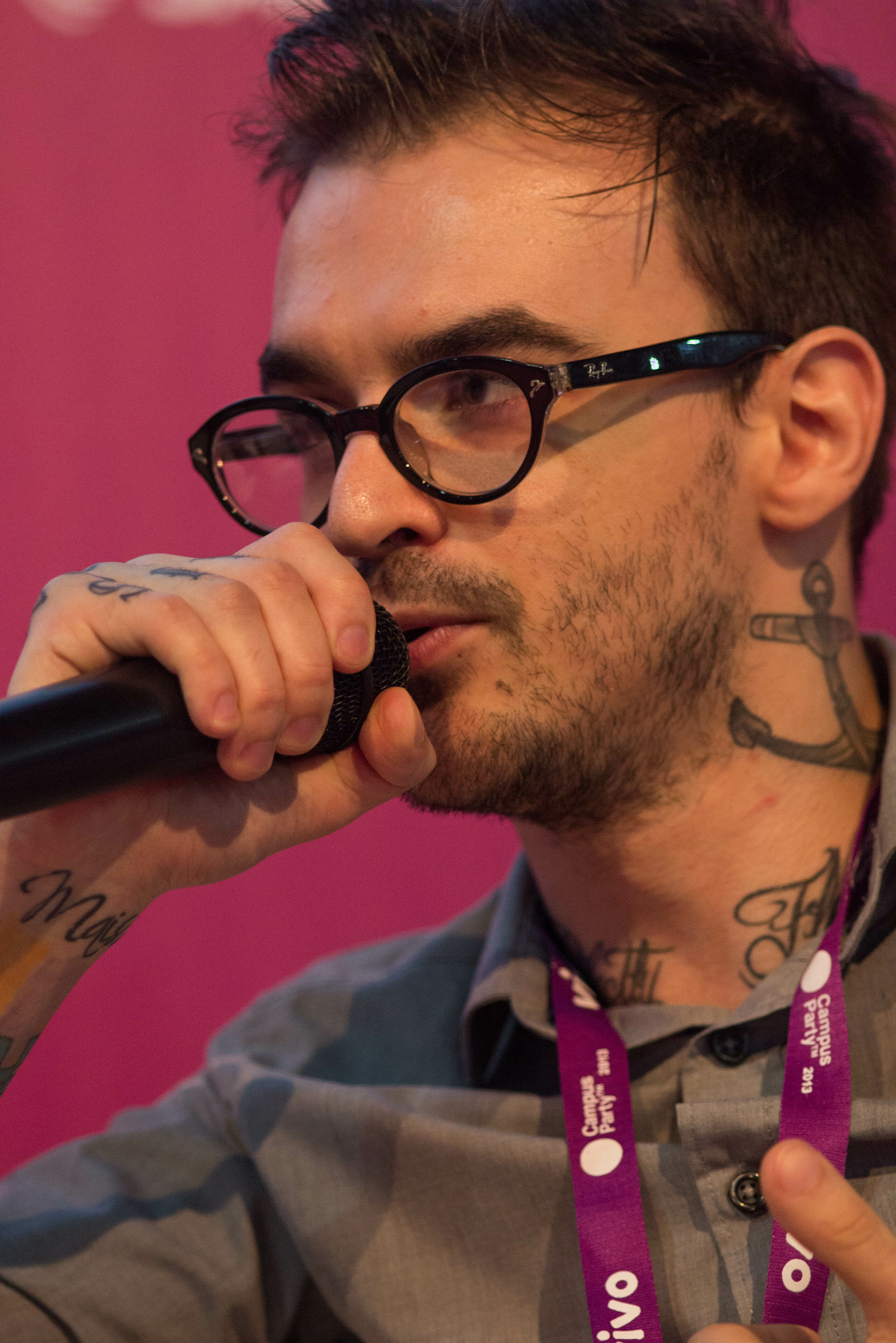
- PC Siqueira in 2013
- Born: Paulo Cezar Goulart Siqueira; 18 April 1986; Guarulhos, São Paulo, Brazil
- Died: 27 December 2023 (aged 37); São Paulo, São Paulo, Brazil
- Occupations: Vlogger; television presenter
- Partners: Felipe Neto; Kéfera Buchmann; Felipe Castanhari

YouTube information
- Channel: PC Siqueira
- Years active: 2010–2023
- Genre: Vlog
- Subscribers: 2.12 million
- Views: 350 million

Paulo Cezar Goulart Siqueira (Brazilian Portuguese: [ˈpawlu ˈsɛzaʁ ɡuˈlaʁtʃi siˈke(j)ɾɐ]; 18 April 1986 – 27 December 2023), better known as PC Siqueira (pronounced [peˈse siˈke(j)ɾɐ]), was a Brazilian YouTuber, presenter, and comic book colourist. He had more than 2 million subscribers on his YouTube account. He made a lot of content for the internet, as well as programs on TV via MTV Brasil, PlayTV and TBS Brasil.

== Biography and career ==
=== Childhood, adolescence and early career ===
As a child, PC was a victim of bullying from other children because of his strabismus, and ended up having to teach himself to read and write at home. He began working as a comic book illustrator and colourist while still a teenager, at the age of fifteen. However, he became known for his work as a vlogger on the "maspoxavida" channel, created in February 2010 on the YouTube website, publishing critical videos, covering current and varied topics. PC brought controversy with his opinions, especially when criticizing religions due to the fact that he was an atheist, such as when making fun of a religious symbol, with the following phrase: "Cockroach, in my opinion, is proof that God does not exist!", and after publishing messages of a religious nature on his microblog.

=== 2011–2013: As presenter on MTV ===
In March 2011, PC debuted a half-hour weekly program on MTV Brazil entitled PC na TV. The program's look represented a computer monitor and, in addition to news given by Siqueira, there were reports, interviews, special articles, with a more documentary character and a different aesthetic concern. The program was canceled in June 2013, along with other MTV Brazil programs, due to a crisis at the broadcaster. In the same month, PC was dismissed by the channel's management. Still at MTV Brasil, he commanded the programs MTV Games, Furo MTV and Nunca Verão.

=== 2015–2016: Jorgecast and Caravana on television ===
In April 2015, he returned to TV and started presenting the Jorgecast program alongside YouTuber Cauê Moura on PlayTV. In May 2016, he joined the cast of the comedy Caravana na TV, on the TBS Brazil channel.

=== 2016–2019: PC Siqueira Está Morto (PC Siqueira Is Dead) and O Aprendiz (The Apprentice) ===
In June 2016, he announced that he would have surgery to correct his strabismus. Still recovering, he released the book PC Siqueira Está Morto (PC Siqueira is Dead), by Alexandre Matias, which covers a part of PC's life using science fiction features. On July 5, 2016, PC published a video on his YouTube channel showing the results of the surgery. He revealed that he decided to have surgery after a conversation with his brother and that he felt his self-esteem was better. In a video published on his channel, he revealed that he suffered from depression, anxiety and panic syndrome.

In 2019, PC participated in the reality show O Aprendiz (The Apprentice), being fired in episode 11.

== Personal life ==
=== Religious and political beliefs ===
PC Siqueira identified himself as an atheist and antireligionist, although at times he ironically expressed an interest in the anti-Christ and in Satanism. He often poked fun at religion and caused controversy, most notably in 2011 when he said he used a Christian cross as a meatbeater and that writing "Cockroach, in my opinion, is proof that God does not exist!" on his blog.

PC Siqueira endorsed Ciro Gomes' presidential bid in the 2018 Brazilian general election.

=== Pedophilia allegations ===
On 10 June 2020, PC Siqueira was accused of sharing pornographic photos of a 6-year-old child. An anonymous Twitter account released cell phone screen recordings where the vlogger talks to an unidentified friend and reports the following experience: PC Siqueira received photographs of the daughter of a woman he was talking to. He later shared the material with said friend. PC Siqueira said these accusations were fake news. Cauê Moura and Rafinha Bastos decided to announce the end of the Ilha de Barbados channel, of which Siqueira was part.

On 16 June 2020, Siqueira gave a statement at the 4th Personal Protection Police Station, after which an official statement was issued, affirming the investigation of the complaint. On the same day, he deactivated his YouTube channel, called "maspoxavida". On 24 February 2021, the Police of the State of São Paulo, after technical investigations by the Superintendency of the Technical-Scientific Police (SPTC), of the Secretariat of Public Security of the State of São Paulo, on the computer, external HD, cell phone, console electronic games and other electronic devices, found no evidence that PC Siqueira had stored, shared, researched child pornography content materials or had contact with minors.

=== Death ===
On 27 December 2023, PC Siqueira was found dead in his apartment in the Santo Amaro neighborhood in the city of São Paulo. He was 37. The case was registered as a suicide by hanging.

== Filmography ==
=== Television ===
Period	Title	Note
2011–2013	PC na TV	Presenter
2011–2013	MTV Games	Presenter
2012	Nunca Verão	Presenter
2013	Furo MTV	Presenter
2015–2023	Jorgecast	Presenter
2016–2023	Caravana no Ar	Presenter
2019	O Aprendiz	Participant

=== Internet ===
Period	Title	Note(s)
2010–2020	Maspoxavida	Vlog / First notable work
2012–2018	Rolê Gourmet	Cooking / With Otávio Albuquerque
2012–2015	Games e Dinossauros	Games / With Diego Quinteiro
2017–2020	Ilha de Barbados	Vlog / With Rafinha Bastos and Cauê Moura
2020–2023	PC Siqueira	PC decides to rename its main channel after accusations of pedophilia it received

=== Movie theater ===
Period	Title	Character	Note	Ref.
2016	Why him?		Special participation	
2016	Going to Brazil	Hipster 2	Special participation	
2017	Internet – O Filme	Joca		
2017	Os Penetras 2 – Quem Dá Mais?	Himself	Special participation	
2018	Maior que o Mundo			

== Awards and nominations ==
With the repercussion of his videos on the internet, PC was nominated for Video Music Brasil 2010 in the Web Star category, he was the winner of the "Geek of the Year" and "WebCeleb" categories of the "Os Melhores da Websfera" award, he was interviewed by Jô Soares and became the poster child for advertising campaigns for electronics and IT lines.

Year	Award	Category	Result	Ref
2010	MTV Video Music Brazil	Webstar	Nominated	
2011	Melhores da Websfera	Geek of the Year	Won	
2013	Shorty Awards	Videoblogger	Won	
