= É Fada! =

2016 film directed by Cris D'Amato

- Directed by: Cris D'Amato
- Written by: Patrícia Andrade; Fernando Ceylão; Sylvio Gonçalves
- Based on: Uma Fada Veio Me Visitar by Thalita Rebouças
- Produced by: Daniel Filho
- Starring: Kéfera Buchmann; Klara Castanho; Bruna Griphao; Mariana Santos; Isabella Moreira; Clara Tiezzi; Silvio Guindane
- Distributed by: Imagem Filmes
- Release date: October 6, 2016 (Brazil)
- Running time: 86 minutes
- Country: Brazil
- Language: Portuguese
- Box office: $6,186,539

É Fada! is a 2016 Brazilian comedy film, directed by Cris D'Amato. It is a film inspired by the book "Uma Fada Veio Me Visitar", by the author Thalita Rebouças, starring Kéfera Buchmann, Klara Castanho, Bruna Griphao, Mariana Santos and Sílvio Guindane.

The film was released in Brazilian cinemas on October 6, 2016.

== Plot ==
Geraldine (Kéfera Buchmann) is a fairy who lost her wings by using unconventional methods in her missions. Her last chance to retrieve them will be the mission "Julia".

== Cast ==
- Kéfera Buchmann as Geraldine (Fairy)
- Klara Castanho as Julia Ribeiro Pontes
- Sílvio Guindane as Vicente Pontes, Julia's father
- Mariana Santos as Alice Ribeiro, Julia's mother
- Bruna Griphao as Verônica
- Isabella Moreira as Ingrid
- Clara Tiezzi as Priscila
- João Fernandes as Pedro
- Christian Monassa as Maureba
- Junior Vieira as Ankô (Elf)
- Carla Daniel as Mrs Hermínia
- Claudia Mauro as Dance teacher
