= Nyvi Estephan =

Brazilian actress and Internet personality (born 1991)

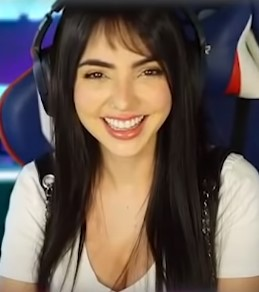
- Estephan in 2020
- Born: August 3, 1991 (age 35); São Paulo, Brazil
- Education: Anhembi Morumbi University; Faculdade Cásper Líbero
- Occupations: Actress; television presenter; digital influencer
- Years active: 2006–present
- Partners: Bruno Sutter (2014–2019); Felipe Castanhari (2020–2023)
- Website: www.nyvi.com.br

Nyvi Estephan (born August 3, 1991) is a Brazilian actress, YouTuber and television presenter, considered one of the most requested esports hosts of Latin America and a pioneer of the genre in Brazil.

== Biography ==
Estephan was born in São Paulo on August 3, 1991; her father was a musician and her mother a plastic artist and theater actress. Her name, "Nyvi", given to her by her father, is a tribute to Jorge Ben's song "Ive Brussel". She has degrees in fashion design and video game journalism from Anhembi Morumbi University and Faculdade Cásper Líbero respectively, beginning an acting career as early as 2006, working for MTV Brasil partaking in sketches by comedy troupe Hermes & Renato, where she met her future fiancé Bruno Sutter. From 2013 she began getting involved in the esports area, being invited in 2016 to pose for Playboy Brasil.

In 2017 she cameod as herself in the Rafinha Bastos-written/produced Internet – O Filme, and was also invited to host SporTV's inaugural edition of the Prêmio eSports Brasil. In 2019 she was hired by Rede Globo to present her own segment on Esporte Espetacular, "Start", and also covered Rock in Rio VIII for the network. Her work later garnered her a nomination as "Presenter of the Year" at the 2019 Esports Awards. Throughout 2020 she was one of the reporters of Big Brother Brasil 20 alongside Fernanda Keulla and Ana Clara Lima; the same year, she co-hosted the dance competition No Gás do Just Dance alongside singer Lexa, broadcast by Multishow.

In 2021, promoting Riot Games' then-recent League of Legends: Wild Rift, she and racing driver Diego Higa collaborated for a YouTube video.

In 2022 she debuted as a voice actress, voicing Ms. Tarantula in the Brazilian dubbing of the animated film The Bad Guys. In 2023, celebrating the 10th anniversary of her career as an esports host, she received a homage during the Prêmio eSports Brasil of that year, which she also co-hosted alongside Sabrina Sato. She hosted the 2024 edition of the Pan American Esports Games, initially scheduled to be held in Rio de Janeiro June 1–9 but later postponed to August 24 – September 1; the same year, she was chosen as the voice of Commander Knoxx (played by Janina Gavankar) in Eli Roth's film Borderlands.

== Personal life ==
From 2014 to 2019 Estephan was engaged to singer and humorist Bruno Sutter, twelve years her senior, whom she met while working for MTV Brasil on sketches by his former comedy troupe Hermes & Renato in the mid-2000s. Shortly after their breakup she began dating fellow YouTuber Felipe Castanhari; their relationship was made public in 2020. They broke up at some point in late 2023, but the end of their relationship was only publicized in early March of the following year.
