= Diego Higa =

Brazilian racing driver (born 1997)

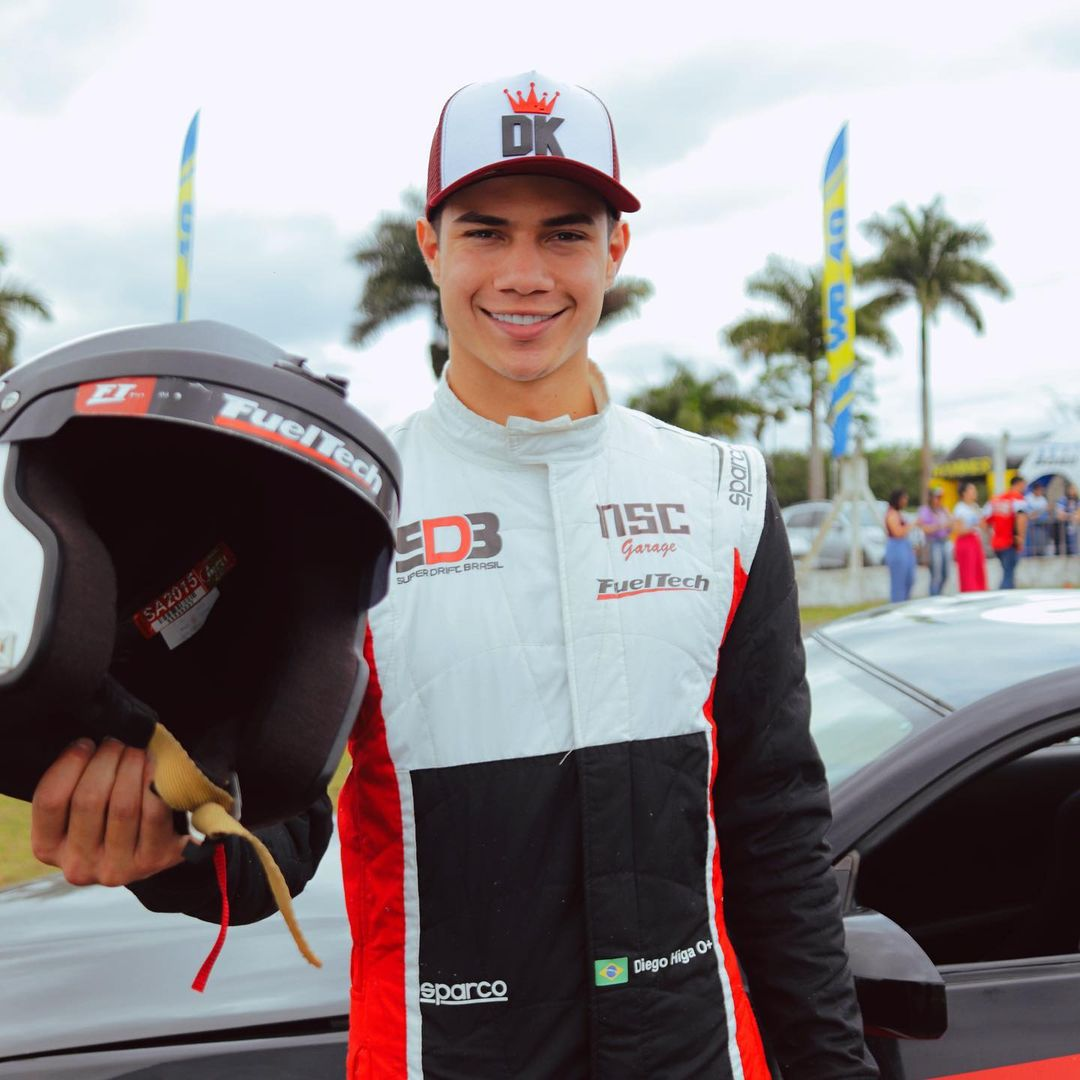
- Diego in 2019
- Nationality: Brazilian
- Born: 18 March 1997 (age 29) Santos, Brazil

SuperDrift Brasil
- Years active: 2015-

Previous series
- 2019: Netflix Hyperdrive

Championship titles
- 2015-2020: SuperDrift Brasil (2015-2020), Brazilian Championship (2016-2019) and Netflix Hyperdrive (2019)

Diego Rafael Higa (born March 18, 1997) is a professional racing driver, Drifting Professor and Netflix Hyperdrive Champion, from Santos, Brazil. Diego is the reference in Drifting in Brazil and has already won more than 38 trophies in his career and was awarded the Golden Helmet by Brazilian Automobile Confederation in 2019.

Higa competed in the United States Formula Drift 2023, in which he won two of the nine matches he took part in, in collaboration with JDMsupreme. Diego was one of only 50 professional drivers allowed to compete the highly coveted stateside drift series. Diego's first attempt at Formula Drift was backed by winning another 22' SuperDrift championship in Brasil, driving his Nissan 350Z, based in Santos, at NSC Garage. He is the owner of Diego Higa's Drifting School, in which he teaches his Drifting style.

Higa also finished as a runner-up in the 2016 King of Nations Drift World Championship, when aged only 16, and holds the records for the most titles (four) in Brazilian Championship, most titles in a row (four) in Brazilian Championship, most titles (6) in SuperDrift Brasil, and most titles in a row (6) in SuperDrift Brasil.

== Early life and career ==
Born in Santos, Brazil, a coastal city and major port hub in Latin America, Higa begun in BMX when he was ten years old. At the age of 13, he started into Motorsport, first in go-karting, then changed to Drifting by influence of his father, who had contact with Drift when he lived in Japan. Higa's first Drift Car was a Chevrolet Omega Suprema. Despite being a wagon not properly suited to Drifting, he managed to master the base skills and quickly moved to more suitable cars, reaching his favourite and still actual Nissan 350Z.

As a teenager, Higa started working with his parents, Neto and Karen Higa, at their NSC garage, focused in tuning cars for Drifting. There, he learned how to set up his own cars and started competing in Drifting Championships. His first major championship was the 2015 SuperDrift Brasil, the top tier league in Latin America, at the age of 18. In the following year, they came second in the world championship (King of Nations Drift), in which he entered a Nissan R34 Skyline. In 2016, also he clinched his first Brazilian Championship, certified by the Brazilian Automobile Confederation (CBA).

== Netflix Hyperdrive ==
In 2019, aged only 21, Higa was invited to take part in Netflix upcoming Drift-based series, called Hyperdrive.

Higa entered the competition running a #69 2006 Ford Mustang V8, sponsored by NSC Garage, Rodera and FuelTech, coached by his father. After a fierce competition, he qualified in his battery at first and managed to keep the best pace to clinch the title in an awesome run against Axel François and Fielding Shredder.

== Spin-offs and drifting school ==
Higa did a lot of exhibitions with famous people or to the public places, like with the Brazilian Red Bull ProSkater Letícia Bufoni, or with the YouTuber, Influencer and Gamer Nyvi Estephan, in a campaign for the launch of Riot Games' new WildRift. He also has a viral video Drifting inside a gas station, between the pumps, sponsored by Portal de Santos. He also practices and regularly uses a private racetrack in the city of Registro, in the southern part of the State of São Paulo, where his Drifting School is based.

== Professional drifting career ==
=== 2015 ===
SuperDrift Brasil Champion for the first time.

=== 2016 ===
Back-to-back SuperDrift Brasil Champion and Brazilian Champion for the first time. Runner-up at the King of Nations Drift World Championship.

=== 2017 ===
SuperDrift Brasil Champion for the 3rd-time in a row, and Brazilian Champion for the second consecutive run.

=== 2018 ===
SuperDrift Brasil Champion for the 4th-time in a row, and Brazilian Champion for the 3rd-time in a row.

=== 2019 ===
SuperDrift Brasil Champion for the 5th-time in a row, and Brazilian Champion for the 4th-time in a row. Netflix Hyperdrive Champion, finished 1st in his qualifier and in the final stage.

=== 2020 ===
SuperDrift Brasil Champion for the 6th-time in a row. Did not enter in the Brazilian Championship.
