= Hyperdrive (American TV series) =

American 2019 reality show on Netflix

- Genre: Reality competition; Auto racing
- Presented by: Michael Bisping; Lindsay Czarniak; Mike Hill; Rutledge Wood
- Composer: David Vanacore
- Country of origin: United States
- Original language: English
- No. of seasons: 1
- No. of episodes: 10

Production
- Executive producers: Aaron Catling; Charlize Theron
- Production location: Eastman Business Park (Rochester, New York)
- Running time: 45–60 minutes
- Production companies: Whalerock Industries; Denver & Delilah Productions

Original release
- Network: Netflix
- Release: August 21, 2019

Hyperdrive is a 2019 American auto racing reality television series on Netflix that is executive produced by Charlize Theron. The series follows elite racing drivers from across the globe competing against each other on one of the largest existing automotive courses.

The full season of Hyperdrive, consisting of 10 episodes, was released on August 21, 2019.

== Format ==
28 international competitors drive around a race track and attempt to navigate specific obstacles and perform maneuvers on a custom made "Hyperdrive" course. Throughout the season, the number of competitors is whittled down until there are six competitors remaining; the competitor who outlasts all others is declared the Hyperdrive champion.

The Hyperdrive course is a drifting course that includes a variable number of obstacles, each of which must be completed in the correct manner. Each obstacle has a series of targets that must be hit or a series of fixed elements that must be avoided. Time penalties are incurred for violating the obstacle's rules (e.g. not completing it within the time limit) or hitting a target in an illegal manner (which includes missing a target). The competition consists of a preliminary qualification round, a series of knockout rounds, and a final round.

The first four episodes are qualifying rounds with ten or twelve competitors competing per episode; there are five or six obstacles on the course. The three competitors with the fastest times in each of the first three episodes automatically advance to the knockout round, while the three competitors with the slowest times are eliminated, including any competitors that did not finish. For the next three episodes, another group of four to six new competitors replaced any competitors who had advanced or were eliminated, and they compete against the six competitors who finished between fourth and ninth place in the previous episode; this continues until all twelve qualification spots are filled.

A total of twelve competitors compete in the knockout rounds, where the difficulty of each obstacle is increased. In the first three knockout rounds, the number of competitors is reduced by two; the competitor having the slowest time is relegated to the wild-card round. The two competitors who are ranked just above the slowest competitor have to compete in a head-to-head race against each other; the competitor who finishes first in the race automatically advances to the next round. The five competitors who did not qualify for the fourth knockout round compete in the wild-card round, with the winner of the final head-to-head race in that round reentering the competition; the four competitors who lose their head-to-head races are eliminated. The fourth and fifth knockout rounds are played similarly to the previous three rounds (albeit with an increased amount of obstacles), but the loser of the head-to-head race is eliminated; this process continues until six competitors remain.

In the final round, the six competitors who had advanced from the fifth knockout round compete against each other in a course that has nine obstacles. The competitor who posts the fastest time in this round is declared the winner of the competition.

=== Presentation ===
The show is hosted by Michael Bisping, Lindsay Czarniak, Mike Hill and Rutledge Wood.

== Results ==
Contestant	Q1	Q2	Q3	Q4	KO1	KO2	KO3	WC	KO4	SF	F
Diego Higa			1st	—	1st	4th	1st	—	1st	1st	1st
Axel François	7th	4th	7th	1st	4th	8th	7th	—	2nd	4th	2nd
Fielding Shredder	5th	2nd	—	—	6th	DNF		1st	6th	6th	3rd
Atsushi Taniguchi	4th	1st	—	—	2nd	7th	5th	—	4th	3rd	4th
João Barion	1st	—	—	—	3rd	1st	3rd	—	3rd	2nd	DNF
Corinna Gräff		6th	5th	3rd	5th	2nd	6th	—	5th	5th	DNF
Alex Gräff		9th	3rd	—	8th	6th	4th	—	7th	7th	
Brittany Williams	2nd	—	—	—	7th	3rd	2nd	—	8th		
Sara Haro	6th	3rd	—	—	9th	5th	8th	2nd			
Jordan Martin		5th	2nd	—	10th	9th		4th			
Faruk Kugay	3rd	—	—	—	11th			3rd			
Alexandre Claudin			9th	2nd	DNF			5th			
Karolina Pilarczyk		7th	4th	4th							
Aaron Parker	8th	8th	6th	5th							
Omar Salaymeh				6th							
Tyrei Woodbury			8th	7th							
John Klarich				8th							
Kisaragi Awano				9th							
Nate Galvez				10th							
Sherry Kamiya											
Saul Valencia											
Mick Wilkes											
Michael Martin											
Brent Pursifull	9th										
Mark Rios											
Michael Pettiford	10th										
Edward Michalak	11th										
Stacey Lee May	DNF										

The contestant won Hyperdrive.
The contestant moved onto the next round.
The contestant came in the top 3 in a qualifying race and moved on to the knockout rounds.
The contestant survived the head-to-head and moved onto the next round.
The contestant was eliminated on that round.

== Episodes ==
No.	Title	Original release date
1	"Qualifier 1: Ready to Launch"	August 21, 2019
We are introduced to the concept and to the first twelve contestants, the top three of which will advance directly to the knock-out rounds, while the bottom three are eliminated. The remaining six will get another chance in the qualifiers. Brazilian drifter João Barion, Brittany Williams, and Faruk Kugay from San Francisco advance to the knock-outs.
2	"Qualifier 2: Roll the Dice"	August 21, 2019
The episode starts with the remainder of South Africa's Stacey Lee May's qualifying lap. Unfortunately, her engine stalls after taking on too much water during "Walk on Water". In the second qualifier, we are introduced to Jordan Martin and his Lamborghini Huracán, which is modified to switch to rear-wheel drive to allow drifting. Atsushi Taniguchi from Japan, Fielding Shredder, and Sara Haro advance to the knock-outs.
3	"Qualifier 3: Enter the Assassin"	August 21, 2019
Diego Higa from Brazil is introduced as "The Baby-faced Assassin". As the youngest competitor in the competition, he lives up to that nickname, winning the qualifier. The other two drivers advancing to the knock-outs are Jordan Martin, and Germany's Alex Gräff whose wife Corinna doesn't make the cut and needs to prove herself in the final qualifier.
4	"Qualifier 4: Go Hard or Go Home"	August 21, 2019
The final qualifier, featuring just 10 contestants, of which the top three will advance to the knock-outs. Omar Salaymeh brought a car that is not suited to drifting and opens his door to hit the targets on the driver's side. Axel François reveals that his strategy was to finish in the middle of the pack so far, to allow him to have as much practice as possible. His strategy was successful, as he, Alexandre Claudin, and Corrina Gräff are the last three drivers to advance to the knock-outs.
5	"Knockout 1: head-to-head"	August 21, 2019
The suspension of Alexandre Claudin's car breaks on approach to The Leveler, tucking his right front wheel under his car. He does not finish and is eliminated. Faruk Kugay and Jordan Martin face off in the first head-to-head, with Martin coming out on top.
6	"Knockout 2: Checkers or Wreckers"	August 21, 2019
Fielding Shredder overcooks his turn and crashes his car into a wall in reverse, not finishing his race and thus getting knocked out of the competition. Axel François goes head-to-head with Jordan Martin, eliminating the latter.
7	"Knockout 3: Track is Hot"	August 21, 2019
Corrina's car takes a direct hit from the Water Cannon, shattering her windscreen on impact. The Water Cannon is removed for the remaining drivers. Corinna is treated for a glass splinter in her eye, then returns to finish her lap, advancing to the next round. Axel François eliminates Sara Haro in the head-to-head.
8	"Wild Card: A Chance at Redemption"	August 21, 2019
Five contestants who were knocked out during the previous rounds get their chance to win a wild card to the final qualifier: Alexandre Claudin, Faruk Kugay, Jordan Martin, Fielding Shredder, and Sara Haro. Fielding earns the wild card for the final knock-out round, that starts right away. In it, Alex Gräff eliminates Brittany Williams in the head-to-head.
9	"Semifinal: Last Chance"	August 21, 2019
Fielding Shredder eliminates Alex Gräff in the head-to-head.
10	"Finale: The Monster"	August 21, 2019
Fielding takes the early lead. Both Corinna and João have their car break down on the track. Axel takes the lead by pushing his car to its limits, its engine catching fire in the pits. Diego misses a target in Walk on Water; his spotter urges him to not take the Rail Slide, but go back through Walk on Water for a second chance. He hits the target on his way back, eliminating his 10 second penalty and winning Hyperdrive.
