= Ghosts Don't Exist =

- Directed by: Eric Espejo
- Written by: Eric Espejo
- Produced by: Tanner Cooley; Eric Espejo; Richard Friend; Aaron Goodmiller
- Starring: Phillip Roebuck; Devon Marie Burt; Frederick Cowie; Josh Davidson
- Cinematography: Kunitaro Ohi
- Edited by: Matt West
- Music by: James Sale
- Production companies: 19th & Wilson
- Distributed by: Echo Bridge Home Entertainment
- Release date: March 14, 2010 (D.C. Film Festival)
- Country: United States
- Language: English
- Budget: $250,000

Ghosts Don't Exist is a 2010 American psychological horror film written and directed by Eric Espejo and starring Phillip Roebuck, Devon Marie Burt, Frederick Cowie and Josh Davidson. A number of local Washingtonian celebrities make cameos in the film, including executive producer Chris Cooley (Washington Redskins), Lindsay Czarniak (NBC 4), Mike O'Meara (former co host of The Don and Mike Show on WJFK-FM), and Todd Yoder (NFL Free Agent).

== Plot ==
Brett Wilson conducts paranormal investigations. He has a popular TV show that airs on a science fiction channel. Ghost hunting, as it has now been dubbed, is the process of investigating locations said to be haunted by paranormal activity that could indicate the presence of spirits or entities not of this world.

Tragedy strikes Brett. His wife passes away and as a result he questions the existence of the afterlife. His show continues to do well but he harbors guilt for not being there when she needed him most.

As he reflects on his priorities, he shocks those around him when he suddenly decides to retire. The network threatens to sue him if he doesn’t at least provide a series finale. He reluctantly agrees to take on the finale when he receives a strange and desperate call from a potential client who claims Brett’s wife is in his home.

== Cast ==
- Phillip Roebuck as Brett Wilson
- Devon Marie Burt as Jennifer Hughes
- Frederick Cowie as Ritchie Lyons
- Josh Davidson as David Sherman
- Katie Foster as Nicole Wilson
- Joe Hansard as Travis Garner
- Ted Taylor as Kurt Wilson
- Chris Kennedy as Sheriff Fuller

== Production ==
Writer/director Eric Espejo has been a huge fan of the horror genre, but not your slasher type flick. He believes using your imagination, rather than a slow-moving monster is more frightening. If the concept of a horror film is somewhat plausible then it enhances the fear. Being a skeptic of shows that feature ghost hunters, he attempted to focus on what could potentially happen on an investigation to these researchers that would absolutely blow them away.

== Post-production and distribution ==
Ghosts Don’t Exist premiered at the D.C. Independent Film Festival on March 14, 2010 where writer/director Eric Espejo won the 2010 Washington, DC Filmmaker Award. The film was one of 17 features selected for the 2010 Eerie Horror Film Festival, and was nominated for two awards: Best Picture and Best Actor (Phillip Roebuck). It is also one of only five feature films selected for the 2010 Chicago Filipino American Film Festival.

With the assistance of production representative, Ronna B. Wallace, distribution deals have been signed for Ghosts Don’t Exist with Horizon Motion Pictures and Echo Bridge Entertainment for international and domestic distribution, the film was included as a bonus film on October 12, 2010 contained with the Ghost Adventures Documentary Film.
