= Mystery Lab =

Brazilian television series

- Portuguese: Mundo Mistério
- Genre: Educational
- Created by: Felipe Castanhari
- Starring: Felipe Castanhari; Bruno Miranda; Lilian Regina
- Voices of: Guilherme Briggs
- Country of origin: Brazil
- Original language: Portuguese
- No. of seasons: 1
- No. of episodes: 8

Production
- Running time: 30 minutes
- Production companies: Estilingue Filmes; Polar Filmes; Psycho N Look; Webedia

Original release
- Network: Netflix
- Release: August 4, 2020

Mystery Lab (Portuguese: Mundo Mistério, literally "Mystery World") is a Brazilian documentary television limited series that premiered on Netflix on August 4, 2020. The series was created by YouTuber Felipe Castanhari, who also serves as presenter.

It features 8 episodes which follow some of humanity's most intriguing mysteries. Among the topics dealt with are the disappearances in the Bermuda Triangle, time travel, the bubonic plague and the possibility of a zombie apocalypse.

== Cast ==
- Felipe Castanhari
- Wendel Bezerra as Raul Gordon
- Bruno Miranda as Betinho
- Lilian Regina as Dr. Thay
- Guilherme Briggs as Briggs
- Maria Cláudia

== Episodes ==
No.	Title	Original release date
1	"Os Mistérios do Triângulo das Bermudas" "The Bermuda Triangle Mysteries"	August 4, 2020
2	"Os 20 milhões de mortos da Grande Peste" "The 20 Million Deaths Caused by the Great Plague"	August 4, 2020
3	"Aprendendo a viajar no tempo" "Learning How to Time Travel"	August 4, 2020
4	"Do lobo ao cão" "From Wolf to Dog"	August 4, 2020
5	"Apocalipse zumbi. E se fosse real?" "Zombie Apocalypse. What if it Was Real?"	August 4, 2020
6	"A grande extinção" "The Great Extinction"	August 4, 2020
7	"O caminho para a superinteligência artificial" "The Path to Artificial Superintelligence"	August 4, 2020
8	"Aquecimento global. Uma grande conspiração?" "Global Warming. A Big Conspiracy?"	August 4, 2020
