= List of Brazilian films of the 2010s =

This is a list of Brazilian films of the 2010s. For a complete alphabetical list, see Category:Brazilian films.

== 2010 ==
- Brazilian films of 2010

== 2011 ==
- Brazilian films of 2011

== 2012 ==
- Brazilian films of 2012

== 2013 ==
- Brazilian films of 2013

== 2014 ==
- Brazilian films of 2014

== 2015 ==
- Brazilian films of 2015

== 2016 ==
- Brazilian films of 2016

== 2017 ==
- Brazilian films of 2017

== 2018 ==
- Brazilian films of 2018

== 2019 ==
- Brazilian films of 2019
