= Kéfera Buchmann =

Brazilian actress, singer, TV hostess, and influencer

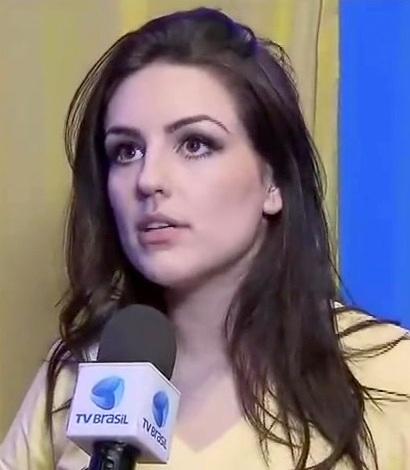
- Buchmann in 2015
- Born: Kéfera Buchmann de Mattos Johnson Pereira; 25 January 1993 (age 33); Curitiba, Paraná, Brazil
- Occupations: Actress; writer

YouTube information
- Channel: 5incominutos
- Years active: 2010–present
- Subscribers: 10.4 million
- Views: 783 million
- Last updated: 19 June 2026

Kéfera Buchmann de Mattos Johnson Pereira (Brazilian Portuguese: /ˈkɛferɐ ˈbuk(i)mɐ̃/; born 25 January 1993) is a Brazilian actress, singer, TV hostess, influencer, writer and YouTuber. She has been named by Forbes as one of the most promising young women in Brazil.

She became known for her YouTube channel 5inco Minutos, which was the first female lead channel of Brazil to reach one million subscribers.

== Biography ==
Buchmann was born and raised in Curitiba, where she completed her primary and secondary education in Catholic schools. She was raised in a Catholic family, and is the daughter of Zeiva (Zeivanez) Buchmann.

Buchmann studied theater for five years. She obtained her actress registration in 2013, earning the highest possible score. Her first name, Kéfera, is of Egyptian origin and means "first morning sunshine". During her high school years, Buchmann was very devoted to St. Anthony (a Catholic Saint). She is bilingual, being fluent in English and her native language, Portuguese, and has also worked as an English teacher.

== Personal life ==
In 2021, Kéfera came out as bisexual.

== Filmography ==
=== Film ===
Year	Title	Role	Notes	Ref.
2014	Big Hero 6	GoGo Tomago (voice)	Brazilian Dubbing	
2014	A Noite da Virada	Party guest	Guest	
2016	É Fada!	Geraldine (Fairy)	Main role	
2016	O Amor de Catarina	Catarina	Main role	
2017	Gosto se Discute	Cristina	Main role	
2019	Eu Sou Mais Eu!	Camilla Mendes	Main role	
TBA	Querido Dane-se	Sara	Main role	

=== Web/Internet ===
Year	Title	Role	Notes
2010–20	5inco Minutos	Herself	First notable work
2011–17	Kéfera Vlog (Kéfera Daily)	Herself	Random Videos from day to day
2014	Parafernalha	Guest	Sketch: "Tipos de Amigos Que Você Encontra Numa Festa"
2015	Minha Vida de Atriz	Herself	Backstage of her theater tour: "Deixa Eu Te Contar"
2015	#YOLOVEGAS	Herself	Webseries recorded in Rock in Rio Las Vegas
2015	YouTube FanFest Brasil	Herself	Exclusive event for YouTube
2015–present	Kéfera Viaja	Herself	A series in which she travels around the world
2016	Tô Voando	Herself	Trilogy sports videos for ɑdidɑs
2017	When Someone Disrespects Your Best Friend	Herself	Lele Pons exclusive videos
2017	When Your Friends Are Better Than You	Herself	Lele Pons exclusive videos
2022	5inco Minutos	Herself	A special video

=== Television ===
Year	Title	Role
2013	Zica	Host
2014	Coletivation	Host
2018	Pega Pega	1 episode
2018	Espelho da Vida	Mariane Cardoso
2019	Ninguém Tá Olhando	Mirian
2023	Drag Race Brasil	Guest judge

== Theater ==
Year	Title	Role	Ref.
2010	Calígula	Cesonia	—
2010	Quem Tem Medo da Família Addams?	Mortícia Addams	—
2011	O Amor é Uma Flor Roxa	—	
2012	Eu Quero Sexo	Bianca/Lady Diaba	
2012	A Casa do Terror	—	
2014	Deu Branco	Herself	
2015	Deixa Eu Te Contar	Herself (with Bruna Louise)	
2022	É Foda	Herself	

== Radio ==
Year	Program	Station
2012	Boa na Pan	Jovem Pan FM Curitiba

== Books ==
Year	Title	Publishing company	Ref.
2015	Muito Mais Que 5inco Minutos	Paralela	
2016	Tá Gravando. E Agora?	Paralela	
2017	Querido Dane-se	Paralela	
2023	TBA		

== Music ==
Year	Title	Music label	Notes
2012	Eu Sou Mesmo Piriguete	Independent	Parody for her YouTube channel "5inco Minutos"
2012	I Hate Christmas	Head Media BR	Parody for her YouTube channel "5inco Minutos"
2013	TPM é Foda	Independent	Parody for her YouTube channel "5inco Minutos"
2015	"Bang" (Anitta)	Movid Films	Parody for her YouTube channel "5inco Minutos"
2015	Canção de Natal	Independent	Parody for her YouTube channel "5inco Minutos"
2016	"Work" (Rihanna)	Movid Films	Parody for her YouTube channel "5inco Minutos"
2016	Sou Fadona	Warner Music Brasil	Soundtrack for movie É Fada!
2016	"É Fada!”	Warner Music Brasil	Soundtrack for movie É Fada!
2016	Dia, Lugar e Hora	Independent	Parody for her YouTube channel "5inco Minutos"
2016	Odiei Crescer (Felipe Castanhari feat. Kéfera and Christian Figueiredo)	Independent	Parody for "The Ovomaltine e Os Extraordinários"
2017	Cansei de Estudar (Christian Figueiredo feat. Kéfera and Felipe Castanhari)	Independent	Parody for "The Ovomaltine e Os Extraordinários"
2017	"Despacito" (Luis Fonsi/Daddy Yankee)	Movid Films	Parody for her YouTube channel "5inco Minutos"
2017	Stalkiei Sem Intenção (Kéfera feat. Christian Figueiredo and Felipe Castanhari)	Movid Films	Parody for "The Ovomaltine e Os Extraordinários"

== Awards and nominations ==
Year	Award	Category	Results	References
2016	Geração Glamour Award	YouTuber of the year (2015)	Won	
2016	Meus Prêmios Nick	Favorite Female YouTuber	Won	
2017	Kids' Choice Awards	Favorite Brazilian Personality	Nominated	
