= Chris Cooley =

American football player (born 1982)

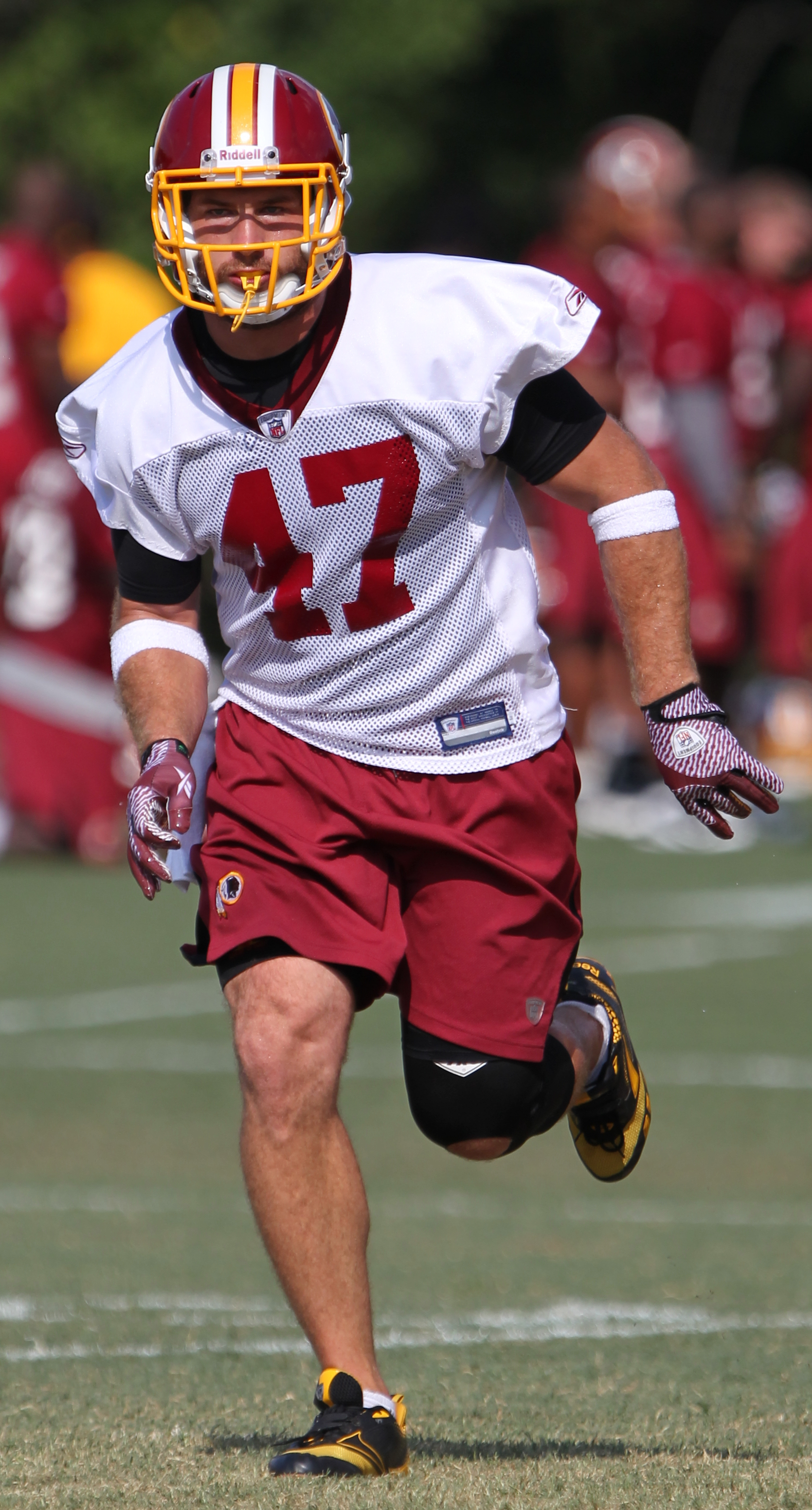
- Cooley in 2011

No. 47
- Position: Tight end

Personal information
- Born: July 11, 1982 (age 44); Powell, Wyoming, U.S.
- Listed height: 6 ft 3 in (1.91 m)
- Listed weight: 243 lb (110 kg)

Career information
- High school: Logan (Logan, Utah)
- College: Utah State (2000–2003)
- NFL draft: 2004: 3rd round, 81st overall pick

Career history
- Washington Redskins (2004–2012)

Awards and highlights
- 2× Pro Bowl (2007, 2008); PFWA All-Rookie Team (2004); Washington Commanders 90 Greatest; First-team All-Sun Belt (2003); Utah State University Athletics Hall of Fame

Career NFL statistics
- Receptions: 429
- Receiving yards: 4,711
- Receiving touchdowns: 33
- Stats at Pro Football Reference

Christopher Ken Cooley (born July 11, 1982) is an American former professional football player who was a tight end for the Washington Redskins of the National Football League (NFL). He played college football for the Utah State Aggies and was selected by the Redskins in the third round of the 2004 NFL draft.

== Early life ==
Cooley attended Logan High School in Logan, Utah, and lettered in football, wrestling, and baseball. As a senior football tight end, he caught 45 passes for 625 yards (13.34 yards per rec. avg.) and on defense, added eight sacks and numerous tackles. In wrestling, he posted a 54–0 record his senior season, winning a Utah state championship and earned All-America honors.

== College career ==
Cooley finished his college football career at Utah State University with 95 receptions for 1,255 yards (13.2 yards per reception). He was part of a talented receiving unit with teammate Kevin Curtis. In 2003, his senior season at Utah State, Cooley led the NCAA in receptions by a tight end.

In 2017 he was inducted into the Utah State University Athletics Hall of Fame.

== Professional career ==
Pre-draft measurables
Height	Weight	Arm length	Hand span	40-yard dash	10-yard split	20-yard split	20-yard shuttle	Three-cone drill	Vertical jump	Broad jump	Bench press
6 ft 3 1/2 in (1.92 m)	265 lb (120 kg)	30 7/8 in (0.78 m)	9 5/8 in (0.24 m)	4.89 s	1.65 s	2.77 s	4.08 s	7.11 s	35.5 in (0.90 m)	9 ft 9 in (2.97 m)	22 reps
All values from NFL Combine/Pro Day

=== 2004 season ===
In 2004, Cooley was drafted in the third round, with the 81st overall pick, of the 2004 NFL draft by the Washington Redskins. After being used sparingly in the first half of the 2004 season, Cooley began to be used more extensively in the last eight games, developing a rapport with Redskins quarterback Patrick Ramsey. In his first NFL season, Cooley led the team in touchdowns with six, while recording 37 receptions for 314 yards, catching three passes of more than twenty yards, and getting 23 first downs. He finished the season with an average of 8.5 yards per catch. He was the Redskins' nominee for the NFL Man of the Year award for his work reading to children and feeding the poor. He is also lesser known by the nickname "Johnny White Guy," which was given to him by Clinton Portis during one of Portis' colorful press conferences, but the off color nickname did not stick.

=== 2005 season ===
During the 2005 season, Cooley had a solid season as a receiver, catching 71 passes for 774 yards and seven touchdowns, including three in a game versus the rival Dallas Cowboys, breaking the Redskins franchise record for receptions as a tight end in a single season. Those three touchdowns cost Cooley his fantasy football playoff game, because his opponent had Cooley on his fantasy team. He led all NFC tight ends in fan voting for the annual Pro Bowl with 422,314 votes, but following player and coach voting (each group had 1/3 weight), was not chosen for the position. He was named first-team All-NFC by Pro Football Weekly.

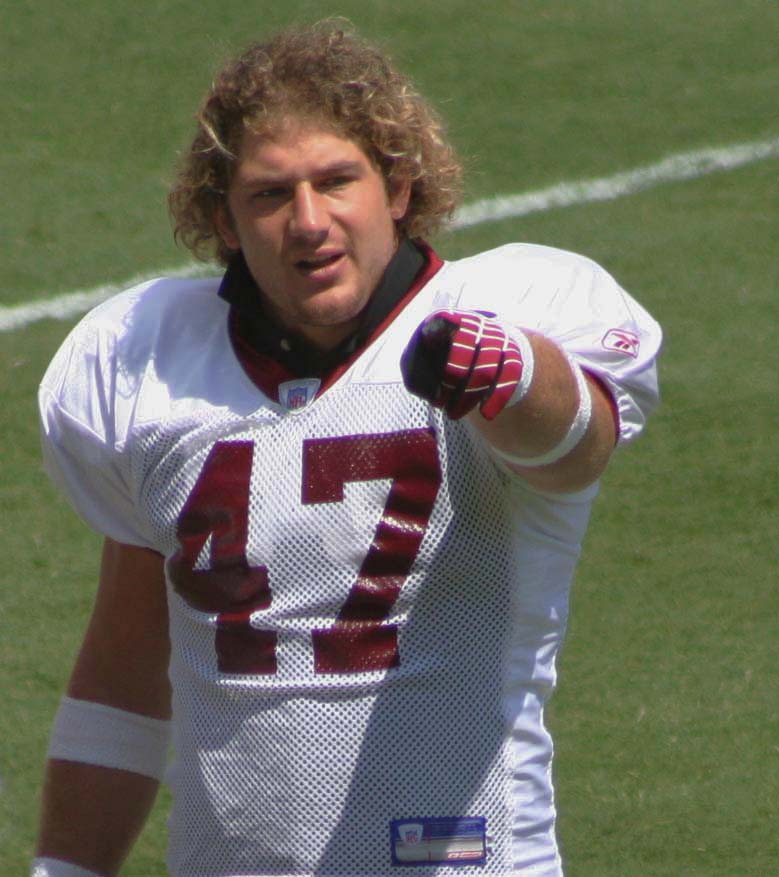
Cooley at Redskins training camp in 2006.

=== 2006 season ===
In 2006, Cooley got off to a slow start under the play-calling of the Washington Redskins' new offensive coordinator, Al Saunders. With only three receptions in the first two weeks of the season, Cooley appeared to not have a place in the new offensive scheme, but in the weeks following, became a growing part of the Redskins offense. He ended the season with numbers slightly less than his sophomore outing, but was still one of the top tight ends in the game.

=== 2007 season ===
On September 1, 2007, Cooley signed a six-year, $30 million contract extension. In 2007, he had scored in all but one game as of week six. In the sixth week, Cooley had nine receptions for a career-high 105 yards and one touchdown in a 17–14 loss against the Green Bay Packers. On December 18, he was named to the 2007 Pro Bowl team with Redskins tackle Chris Samuels, long-snapper Ethan Albright, and the late safety Sean Taylor. Cooley, Samuels and Albright wore Taylor's number 21 during the Pro Bowl in honor of him. Cooley set an NFL record by being the only tight end in league history to have six or more touchdowns in each of his first four seasons.

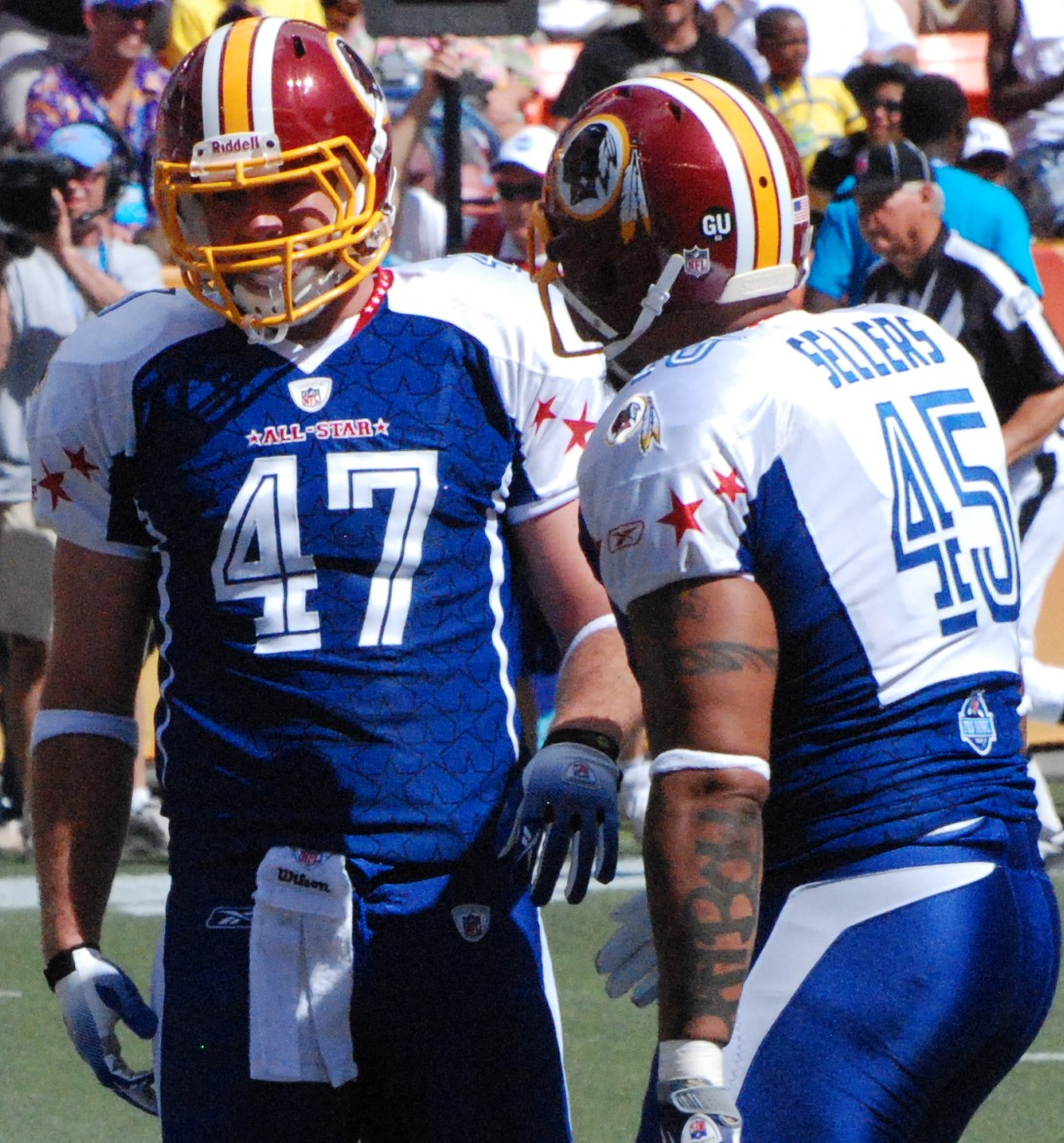
Cooley with Mike Sellers at the 2009 Pro Bowl

=== 2008 season ===
In 2008, Cooley scored only one touchdown. In Week 5, he had eight receptions for a career-high 109 yards and one touchdown, on a pass from Antwaan Randle El in a 23–17 win against the Philadelphia Eagles. Cooley finished the season with 83 catches for 849 yards and one touchdown, with career highs in both catches and yardage. He was the only player not to get into the stat book in the 2009 Pro Bowl.

=== 2009 season ===
Cooley broke his ankle in a matchup against the Philadelphia Eagles on October 26, 2009. It was initially speculated that Cooley would miss the remainder of the 2009 season. On October 27, 2009, Cooley commented via Twitter that the break may not have been as bad as originally thought and that he could possibly return in as little as four weeks. His longest play of the year was a 66-yard touchdown. On November 30, 2009, Cooley was placed on injured reserve.

=== 2010 season ===
Cooley played in all sixteen games of the 2010 season, but had arthroscopic surgery on his left knee after the season on January 3, 2011.

=== 2011 season ===
Still recovering from the arthroscopic surgery to his left knee, Cooley did not play in any of the preseason games in 2011. Cooley played only in the 2011 season's first five games. After the win in Week 1 against the New York Giants, Cooley became the Washington Redskins' all-time leader in receptions at the tight end position with 422 receptions, breaking the previous franchise record of 421 set by Jerry Smith. In Week 3 against the Dallas Cowboys, Cooley subbed in for Darrel Young and Mike Sellers, who were both injured, and played the fullback position for the first time in his career. In Week 6 against the Philadelphia Eagles, Cooley suffered a broken finger. On October 25, 2011, Cooley was placed on injured reserve after his knee was examined further by his doctor and he was told that it would take another four or five weeks before full recovery.

=== 2012 season ===
During the preseason, it was reported that Cooley's knee was completely healed from the surgery and that he even lost 20 pounds to prepare for the 2012 season. However, Cooley was released by the Redskins on August 28, 2012. It had been hinted by general manager Bruce Allen that Cooley could return to the Redskins.

On October 21, 2012, Cooley agreed to re-sign with the Redskins after Fred Davis tore his Achilles tendon and was done for the season.

== NFL career statistics ==
Legend
**Bold**	Career high

Year	Team	Games		Receiving				
Year	Team	GP	GS	Rec	Yds	Avg	Lng	TD
2004	WAS	16	9	37	314	8.5	31	6
2005	WAS	16	16	71	774	10.9	32	7
2006	WAS	16	16	57	734	**12.9**	**66**	6
2007	WAS	16	16	66	786	11.9	39	**8**
2008	WAS	16	16	**83**	**849**	10.2	28	1
2009	WAS	7	7	29	332	11.4	25	2
2010	WAS	16	15	77	**849**	11.0	35	3
2011	WAS	5	5	8	65	8.1	17	0
2012	WAS	9	2	1	8	8.0	8	0
Career		117	102	429	4,711	11.0	66	33

== Retirement and post-playing career ==
On July 16, 2013, The Washington Post reported that Cooley was retiring from the NFL. The Post further reported that Cooley would join the Washington Redskins' radio broadcast team as an analyst.

Cooley also co-hosted Cooley & Kevin, a morning drive time sports show on ESPN 980 in D.C., with Kevin Sheehan. The show was cancelled in 2018. Cooley now hosts his own podcast, The Chris Cooley Show, in which he discusses Redskins and NFL news and breaks down each week's game film. He also produces weekly film review segments on the Redskins' official website.

On August 11, 2015, it was reported that Cooley expressed interest into returning to the NFL after working out at the Redskins facility during the off season. Cooley never officially retired from the NFL after not being re-signed by the Redskins in 2013. After playing only with the Redskins throughout his entire career, he was afraid to tarnish his legacy by joining another team. The following month, Cooley attended a workout for the New York Giants but was not signed.

On September 1, 2022, Cooley was inducted into Washington's Greatest Players list in honor of the franchise's 90th anniversary.

== Personal life ==
Cooley resides in Powell, Wyoming; he moved back to his childhood hometown due to COVID-19.

Though he has previously attended the Church of Jesus Christ of Latter-day Saints, he has not affiliated with that Church since at least 2004.

His first marriage to Angela ended in divorce 2005. Later that year, he started dating Redskinette (Redskin cheerleader) Christy Oglevee. She was fired for fraternizing with Redskins players, which the Redskins organization prohibits. They married on May 23, 2008, in Lansdowne, Virginia. In January 2012 they separated and in September they announced their intent to divorce. Cooley's first child, daughter Sloane, was born on September 11, 2014. He is currently married to Madi Debray. In 2017 their son Bodhi was born. Cooley owned and operated an art gallery in Leesburg, Virginia from 2010 to 2019 where he also owned a home from 2007 to 2021. He and Debray relocated to Cooley's early childhood hometown of Powell, Wyoming in August 2020.

Cooley, frequently referred to by his nickname "Captain Chaos," is known for his eccentric hair styles, affinity for heavy metal music, and what one reporter has called an "Animal House persona". This nickname was created when teammates bet him he would not go out to the opening coin toss and introduce himself to the opposing team captains as "Captain Chaos". Cooley did so and the nickname stuck.

Cooley maintains his own blog, "The Cooley Zone." On Sunday, September 14, 2008, Cooley posted on his blog a photo of Redskins training materials that also included his genitals. The picture remained on his site all day Sunday until it was finally removed. Cooley apologized and referred to the incident as "a complete accident", claiming that he initially posted the photo without realizing it showed his genitals. He at one time maintained an online store through eBay, featuring jerseys, cards, and other personalized memorabilia. Cooley is an avid trading card collector, a hobby he rediscovered while searching for his own football cards.

Cooley is executive producer of the independent film Ghosts Don't Exist, which began production in May 2009. He was featured in an episode of Jake and Amir for the comedy website CollegeHumor.

Cooley majored in art at Utah State, and now pursues a side career as a potter.

Cooley made several appearances in TV commercials for Easterns Automotive Group, a local car dealership group on the DC and Baltimore areas, alongside Clinton Portis, Antwaan Randle El, Sean Taylor and Jason Campbell.
