= Daniel Furlan =

- Born: Daniel Sarcinelli Furlan; April 7, 1980 (age 46); Vitória, Espírito Santo, Brazil
- Education: Federal University of Espírito Santo; University of Greenwich
- Occupations: Actor, comedian, screenwriter, musician, presenter, cartoonist

Daniel Sarcinelli Furlan (born 7 April 1980) is a Brazilian actor, comedian, screenwriter, musician, host, and cartoonist. He is a member of the production company TV Quase and one of the creators and performers of comedy shows such as Choque de Cultura, Falha de Cobertura, and O Último Programa do Mundo. He has also worked as a screenwriter and voice actor on the animated series Jorel's Brother and appeared in the HBO series Pico da Neblina.

== Biography ==
Born in Vitória, Espírito Santo, Daniel Furlan earned a degree in communications from the Federal University of Espírito Santo. He then moved to London, where he completed a master's degree in Media Arts at the University of Greenwich, with a thesis titled Guilty Laughter that examined the dynamics between laughter and guilt. Before devoting himself entirely to audiovisual production, he worked as a window salesman in London and as a DJ at graduation events. During his time in London, he also worked in the video games industry.

In 2002, Furlan became a cartoonist for the independent comic book magazine Quase, published in Vitória. In 2009, he founded, alongside collaborators, the production company TV Quase, focused on comedy shows. Its programs were initially aired through its YouTube channel. In 2013, Furlan was one of the last people hired by MTV Brasil, where he created, wrote, directed, and acted in the apocalyptic talk show O Último Programa do Mundo. When the network shut down that same year, the group resumed TV Quase's activities on YouTube, continuing projects such as O Último Programa do Mundo itself.

In 2016, Furlan began starring alongside Caito Mainier, Raul Chequer, and Leandro Ramos in the comedy show about cinema, Choque de Cultura. The show's success on the internet led to it being broadcast on TV Globo, Canal Brasil, and Globoplay. In 2025, a series based in the show was released, titled Choque de Cultura – A Série. Furlan also served as a screenwriter for the animated series Jorel's Brother, for which he wrote scripts and provided voice acting, in addition to composing its opening theme. He also starred as Vini in the HBO series Pico da Neblina.

From 2006 to 2016, Furlan was the vocalist and guitarist of the rock band Ócio, which released two albums, Mood Swings (2006) and Guilty Beat (2010), and a single, Pump Up the Jam (2016). In 2023, he founded the indie rock band Tropical Nada with Zé Ruivo and Bento Abreu, which released a self-titled album that same year on Deck. The release of the second album, Eu Não Me Aguento Mais, is scheduled for 2027.

== Filmography ==
=== Television ===
Year	Title	Role	Network
2013	Em Movimento	Presenter	TV Gazeta Vitória
2013	Furo MTV	Presenter, actor	MTV Brasil
2013	Rockgol	Commentator, presenter	MTV Brasil
2013	Overdose	Actor	MTV Brasil
2013-2016	O Último Programa do Mundo	Presenter	MTV Brasil, FX
2014-2016	Lili, a Ex	Actor	GNT
2014–present	Jorel's Brother	Screenwriter, musician, voice actor	Cartoon Network, HBO, Netfllix, TV Cultura
2015-2016	Show do Kibe	Actor	TBS
2016	Foca News	Presenter, actor	FX
2016	Décimo Andar	Screenwriter, actor	Canal Brasil
2016	Terminadores	Actor	Rede Bandeirantes
2016-2018	Lady Night	Screenwriter, actor	Multishow, TV Globo
2016-2023	Choque de Cultura	Creator, screenwriter, actor	TV Quase, TV Globo, Canal Brasil
2018-2019	Samantha!	Actor	Netflix
2019-2022	Pico da Neblina	Actor	HBO
2023	Falha de Cobertura	Creator, screenwriter, actor	Paramount
2023	Wake Up, Carlo!	Screenwriter	Netflix
2024	Cosme e Damião: Quase Santos	Actor	Globoplay
2025	Choque de Cultura: A Série	Creator, screenwriter, actor	Canal Brasil, Globoplay

=== Cinema ===
Year	Title	Role
2014	Copa de Elite	Zero Dois
2014	A Noite da Virada	Matias
2015	Desculpe o Transtorno	Proponent
2016	Going to Brazil	Hipster
2017	Transtornada Obsessiva Compulsiva	Vladimir
2017	La Vingança	Vadão
2018	Uma Quase Dupla	Dado
2023	Ciclo	Diego
2024	Dois é Demais em Orlando	Anderson Cabello
2024	Amigos sem Compromisso	DJ Ânion
2024	Noah's Ark	Ferret and Woodpecker (voices)
2025	Detetives do Prédio Azul 4	Helenort
2026	Projeto Passaporte para a Polônia	Craque Daniel
