= Lucas Lira =

Brazilian YouTuber

- Born: Lucas Lira Soares; 16 April 1994 (age 32); Brasília, Brazil
- Other name: Lira
- Occupations: YouTuber; businessperson
- Spouse: Sunaika Bruna (m. 2014)

YouTube information
- Channel: inventonahora
- Years active: 2010–present
- Genres: Vlog; Comedy
- Subscribers: 14.1 million
- Views: 4.25 billion
- Last updated: 4 August 2026

Lucas Lira Soares (born April 16, 1994), is a Brazilian YouTuber, businessperson, and influencer. He gained popularity through his vlogs on the YouTube channel Invento na Hora, where he showcases his daily life with humor, often featuring his partner and child.

== Biography and career ==
Lucas Lira, born in North Samambaia, is the creator of the "Invento na Hora" channel, one of the top 100 YouTube channels in Brazil. When he finished high school, he took a technical course in web design. He also worked as a photo editor, shop assistant and lottery assistant. After this period, he decided to create a YouTube channel. In 2010, Lucas Lira Soares wanted to be an influencer, but he did not own a camera to record videos. Finally, in 2012, Lira was able to acquire a camera, which helped for him as he was able to start the channel Invento na Hora. The channel's name came from the fact that he did not plan any scripts for the videos. The name of the channel translates to "I invent on the spot". Glasses, bandanas and caps were part of the channel's early identity, though he later stopped using them.

In 2014, Lucas Lira made an appearance on Phenomenon of the Internet, a segment on the Eliana program on SBT. This opportunity arose after one of his videos from 2013 had gone viral on the web. Although he did not win the competition, his presence generated considerable buzz and he even reached one of the top spots in Twitter's Trending Topics. This gave Invento na Hora more visibility and in November 2014, Lucas Lira reached 1 million subscribers.

Because of his recognition as a YouTuber, he has participated in other television programs. These include Legendários, Programa Raul Gil and Domingo Legal. In 2016, he wrote the book Minha Vida Antes do Invento na Hora. It mainly tells stories from when he was younger. In the same year, he was the winner of Entubados, a reality show for YouTubers on the Sony channel.

As of October 2023, the Invento Na Hora channel has more than 15 million subscribers. Lira also has almost 6 million Instagram followers and over 3 million followers on X.

== Personal life ==
Lira has been dating fellow YouTuber Sunaika Bruna de Souza since 2014. They got engaged in 2020. They have been in several videos together since they started dating. On 5 July 2020, it was announced that they were expecting their first child. Their son, Noah de Souza Lira Soares, was born in February 2021.

In 2015, Lucas left his parents' house and moved to São Paulo and lived there for 6 years. In 2021, he returned to Brasília.

== Filmography ==
=== Television ===
Year	Title	Role
2014	Eliana Program	Participant
2015	Brazil Urgent	interviewee
2015	Panic in the Band	Participant
2016	legendary	Participant
2016	Nice Sunday	Participant
2016	Raul Gil Program	Participant
2016	intubated	Participant
2016	The Night with Danilo Gentili	Guest
2017	TVZ	Presenter

=== Internet ===
Year	Title	Role
2012–2017	Lucas Lira	himself
2014–present	Invento na Hora	himself
2016	paraphernalia	Rap Singer
2016	Whindersson Nunes	Guest
2020	Flow Podcast	Guest
2021	Eu fico loko	Guest

=== Video clips ===
Year	Title	Artist
2017	No Ostentation	Mc Dudu

== Books ==
- "Minha Vida Antes do Invento na Hora".

== Awards and nominations ==
Year	Award	Category	Result
2016	Intubated	Season 1 Winner	Won
