= Chilli Beans =

Brazilian sunglasses and watches brand

- Company type: Private
- Founded: 1997; 29 years ago
- Headquarters: São Paulo, Brazil
- Area served: Brazil; United States; Portugal; Mexico; Chile; Colombia; Peru; Bolivia; United Arab Emirates; Kuwait; Thailand
- Key people: Caito Maia (CEO)
- Products: Sunglasses; Eyeglasses; Watches
- Owners: Caito Maia, Gávea Investment Group
- Website: https://chillibeans.com/

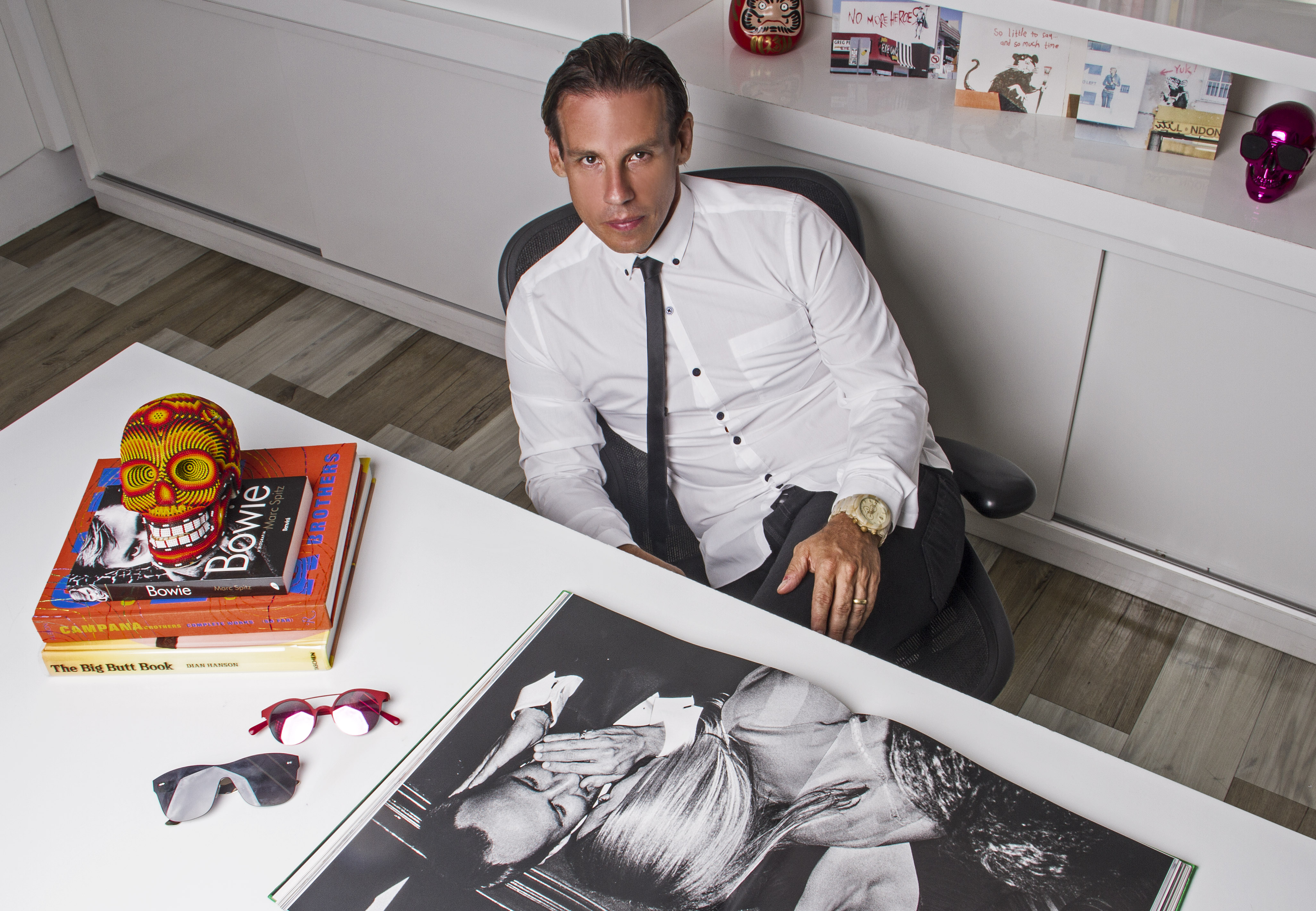
Caito Maia, the creator of the brand.

Chilli Beans is a Brazilian brand of sunglasses, wristwatches and eyeglasses founded in 1997 by the businessman Caito Maia. It ranks as the second-largest company in the sunglasses segment, trailing only the Luxottica Group. It is also the most successful company in its sector across Latin America. The Gávea Investment Group bought 30% of the company for about R$100 million, indicating that the company is worth about R$330 million. The company's turnover was approximately R$550 million. The brand has approximately 700 stores in Brazil, in addition to owning stores in 9 other countries.
