= Notpron =

2004 online puzzle game

- Developer: David Münnich
- Platform: Browser based
- Release: WW: 2004
- Genre: Puzzle game

Notpron (originally stylized as Not Pr0n) is an online puzzle game and internet riddle created in 2004 by German game developer David Münnich. Launched in mid-2004, it describes itself as the "hardest riddle available on the internet" and has developed a reputation for its high level of difficulty.

Regarded as one of the first of the online puzzle game genre, Notpron follows a standard puzzle game layout, where the player is presented with a webpage containing a riddle and must find the answer to the riddle in order to proceed to the next webpage.

== History ==
Notpron's first level, which requires the player to click the door to proceed. Subsequent levels increase in difficulty, requiring the player to perform various tasks such as modifying the URL, editing images, and viewing the page source code for clues.

Inspired by a game he played online entitled "This is not Porn", Münnich created the first five levels in 2004, put them in a folder temporarily called "notpron", and posted it on his website. Soon thousands of people showed up to play the game and, by then, it was too late to change the name. In interviews, creator David Münnich explained that he was inspired by other early online riddles and designed the first five levels of Notpron in 2004 as an experiment in logic and observation-based puzzles. According to Münnich, he was not originally a puzzle enthusiast; the game began as a simple idea and gradually expanded in complexity as more levels were added. As of October 2020, only 100 people have completed the game, out of 20 million visitors since August 2004. However, as of November 2015, reporting by VICE indicated that only about 34 players had been confirmed to solve all levels, making it one of the hardest online riddles ever created.

== Gameplay ==
The game had a total of 140 "levels", ranging from 82 "positive" levels, a level "zero", 44 "negative" levels, and 13 "Greek" levels (Ranging from "Alpha" to "Nu"). A couple of the final levels that required interaction with the game creator have since been removed. These three level groups do not differ from each other, apart from having different names, though each consecutive level increases in difficulty. Levels consist of finding either a password (known as a "UN/PW" by the game's community) or finding a URL to use in order to proceed to the next level. Passwords do not require a player to create an account but instead are given to a player once they have found the answer to a level's riddle. Each level answer or solution is unique, often requiring specific skills such as decoding ciphers, image editing, musical knowledge, and formerly, remote viewing. Many of its challenges require players to analyze image metadata, inspect website source code, and decode audio files hidden within the game’s levels, skills later used in cybersecurity puzzle design.

== Reception ==
Kashann Kilson of Inverse called the game "the perfect combination of a logic puzzle and an online scavenger hunt." Notpron has continued to attract attention for its influence on modern puzzle design and cybersecurity training. Players and developers have cited this game as an inspiration for logic challenges and capture the flag competitions that use similar problem solving methods.
