= Do Not Believe His Lies =

2014 mobile puzzle video game

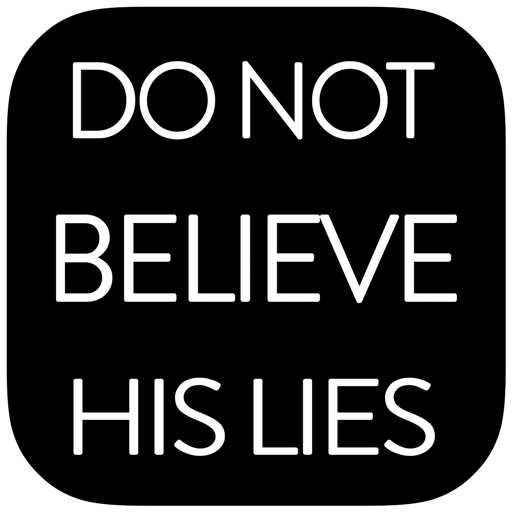
- Developer: theM Dev
- Platforms: iOS, Android
- Release: July 10, 2014
- Genre: Puzzle

Do Not Believe His Lies was a 2014 puzzle mobile app game designed by Polish designer Lukasz Matablewski. Matablewski released the app to the iTunes storefront on July 10, 2014, and since its release, the game has developed a Reddit following. According to the official website, zero players have completed the game, and over 275,000 people are participating in Do Not Believe His Lies.

In 2018, the developer removed the game's website and database, effectively shutting down the game, and they have not been restored since.

== Gameplay ==
The gameplay is centered on the player solving a series of puzzles and riddles. The puzzles grow more and more complex as the player continues to solve them, and some require the player to utilize various mobile device features.

== Reception ==
The reception for the game before its completion was positive. TUAW complimented the game's storytelling aspect, writing, "A fascinating part of the game and what makes it rather enjoyable is that each code seems to form a kind of story." Kotaku gave a more mixed review due to the app charging for puzzle hints, writing "I do understand that the developer needs to make money off this game somehow, but it's hard not to walk away with the sense that it was deliberately made difficult to try to squeeze as much money away from people as possible. Maybe that's just me being cynical. And maybe it doesn't matter in the end—the game is pretty damn good."
