= Felipe Castanhari =

Brazilian YouTuber and television personality (born 1989)

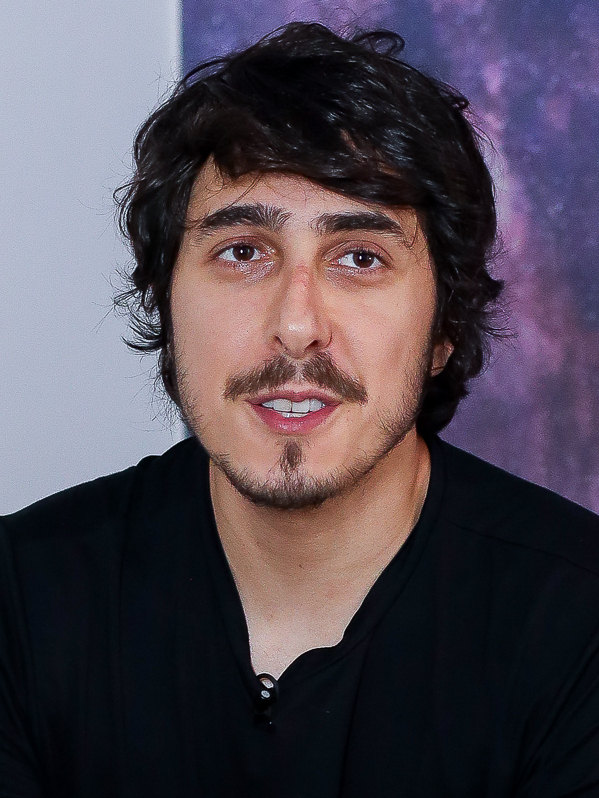
- Castanhari at Campus Party Brasil, 2024
- Born: Felipe Mendes Castanhari; December 20, 1989 (age 36); São Paulo, São Paulo, Brazil
- Occupations: YouTuber; television presenter; actor
- Partner: Nyvi Estephan (2020–2023)

YouTube information
- Channel: Canal Nostalgia
- Years active: 2011–present
- Genres: History; popular culture; education; information
- Subscribers: 15 million
- Views: 1.59 billion
- Last updated: 31 August 2025

Felipe Mendes Castanhari (Brazilian Portuguese: [feˈlipi ˈmẽdʒis kastɐ̃ˈɲaɾi, fiˈ-]; born December 20, 1989) is a Brazilian YouTuber, graphic designer and television presenter, best known for his YouTube channel Canal Nostalgia (since 2011) and for creating and presenting the Netflix limited series Mystery Lab (2020). He was nominated for a Meus Prêmios Nick and a Prêmio Jovem Brasileiro in 2017, and for a MTV MIAW Award in 2018.

== Biography ==
Castanhari was born in São Paulo on December 20, 1989, and raised in the neighboring city of Osasco. He is of Portuguese and Italian descent. Beginning his career working as a graphic designer and 3D animator at the post-production department of a São Paulo-based advertising agency, he started a YouTube channel in 2011, motivated by the fact that, one day, while researching about media he grew up with as a child during the 1990s on YouTube, "couldn't find any satisfactory results". His first successful video was about the Brazilian version of the show Disney Club, but as time went by Castanhari shifted the focus of his videos from nostalgic media and popular culture to also comment on history, science and politics.

In 2014, Castanhari's channel received strikes from Warner Bros. and 20th Century Fox for copyright infringement. Following backlash and a series of petitions from fans and other YouTubers, the strikes were subsequently revoked. A 2016 video, in which he discussed the 1964–85 Brazilian military dictatorship from a self-described "apolitical perspective", received criticism from right-wing and far-right sympathizers. In March 2016, he was featured in the "Forbes 30 Under 30" list by Forbes Brasil.

In February 2017, he appeared in Internet – O Filme, written and produced by Rafinha Bastos, alongside several other Brazilian internet personalities, playing the character Mateus. In October 2017, Castanhari hosted a television series for the History Channel based on journalist Leandro Narloch's book Guia Politicamente Incorreto da História do Brasil. Controversially, the series' producers misled the several historians interviewed for the series by omitting the subject of the show. Disagreeing with Narloch's views, several of the interviewed historians asked for their interviews to be removed following the show's premiere. Castanhari later clarified that he had no control over the show's production except for his own lines.

In November 2019, alongside several other YouTubers, he took part in a Black Friday livestream, recorded at the YouTube Space in Rio de Janeiro. At the time, it was YouTube's longest livestream, lasting for over five hours. In April 2019, his first book, Almanaque Nostalgia, was published through Editora Planeta. In May 2019, he announced he began work in a Netflix limited educational series, Mundo Mistério (released in English-speaking territories as Mystery Lab), which eventually premiered on August 4, 2020. In 2021, he made a brief 10-second cameo as a photographer in Monica and Friends: Lessons, the sequel to 2019's Monica and Friends: Bonds, both films based on the famous Turma da Mônica comic books by Mauricio de Sousa.

In April 2020, amidst the COVID-19 pandemic, Castanhari asked for other YouTubers to divulge information about the disease. In December 2021, he was legally made to financially compensate a sum of R$25,000 to humorist Marcius Melhem after directing a series of insulting posts towards him on Twitter; earlier that year, Melhem was accused of sexual harassment by several women. In December 2023, his year-end video guest starring Kevin O Chris was criticized for supposedly associating singer Taylor Swift with the figure of the Grim Reaper, in what was perceived as a reference to the death of Ana Clara Benevides. The video was further criticized for paying tribute to fellow YouTuber PC Siqueira, who had committed suicide amidst allegations of pedophilia.

== Personal life ==
From 2020 to late 2023 Castanhari was in a relationship with fellow digital influencer Nyvi Estephan; their breakup, however, was only made public a year later.

In a 2015 video on his channel, he described himself as agnostic.

== Awards and nominations ==
Castanhari was featured in the "UNDER 30" list by Forbes Brasil in March 2016, and in December 2019, the market research firm Instituto QualiBest rated him as the 7th most influential Brazilian YouTuber.

| Year | Award | Category | Result | Ref. |
|---|---|---|---|---|
| 2017 | Meus Prêmios Nick | Best YouTuber | Nominated | |
| 2017 | Prêmio Jovem Brasileiro | Best YouTuber | Nominated | |
| 2018 | MTV MIAW Award | Parody of the Year | Nominated | |
