= 2016 Washington Redskins season =

85th season in franchise history

- Owner: Daniel Snyder
- General manager: Scot McCloughan
- President: Bruce Allen
- Head coach: Jay Gruden
- Offensive coordinator: Sean McVay
- Defensive coordinator: Joe Barry
- Home stadium: FedExField

Results
- Record: 8–7–1
- Division place: 3rd NFC East
- Playoffs: Did not qualify
- Pro Bowlers: LB Ryan Kerrigan; TE Jordan Reed; G Brandon Scherff; T Trent Williams; QB Kirk Cousins

Uniform
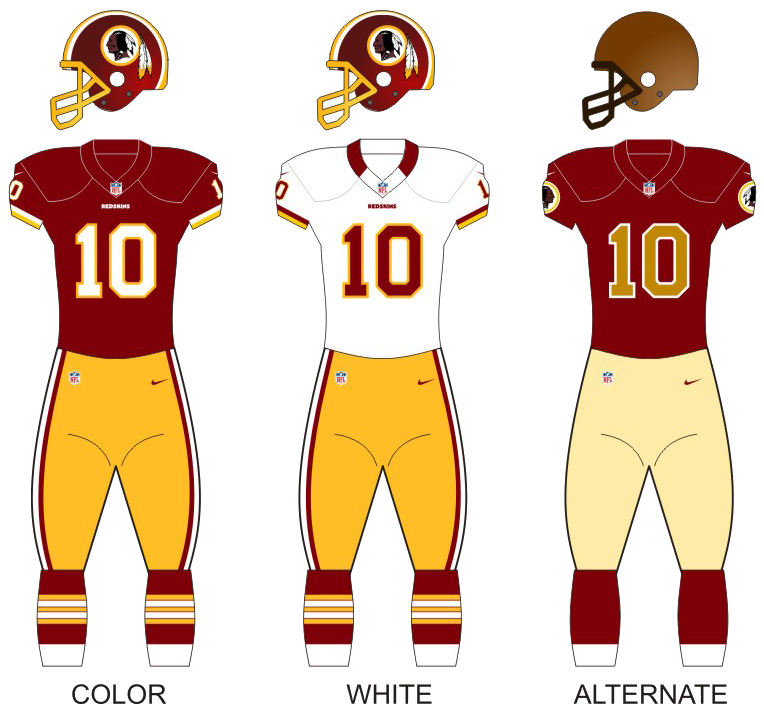

The 2016 season was the Washington Redskins' 85th in the National Football League (NFL), their 20th playing home games at FedExField and their third under head coach Jay Gruden.

The season saw the Redskins play in London for the first time in franchise history, where they tied the Cincinnati Bengals 27–27.

In the final week of the season, the Redskins were eliminated from playoff contention following their loss to the New York Giants. Despite missing the playoffs, the Redskins finished the season with a record of 8–7–1, which was the first consecutive winning seasons for the team since the 1996 and 1997 seasons. Along with the Philadelphia Eagles, Washington was the only team in 2016 that played seven regular-season games against teams that would reach the playoffs: four games combined against the Dallas Cowboys and the New York Giants, games against the Green Bay Packers and Detroit Lions (as the NFC North was the only division besides the NFC East to send more than one team to the 2016 postseason) and a game against the sole AFC North 2016 playoff team (the Pittsburgh Steelers); the Redskins' 2–5 record in these contests was a major reason they did not return to the playoffs. This was the final time the team had a winning season being known as the Redskins, as they retired the branding four years later. Washington would not have a winning season again until 2024, when they became known as the Commanders.

== Offseason changes ==
=== Free agency ===
All 2015 contracts expired to coincide with the beginning of the 2016 NFL League Year at 4:00 EDT on March 9, 2016. However, before that date, all teams had until March 1 to place the franchise tag on a player, and could begin negotiations with a player's agent on March 7.

==== Waivers and releases ====
On March 8, the Redskins released S Dashon Goldson, DE Jason Hatcher, QB Robert Griffin III, and S Jeron Johnson.

On April 14, the Redskins waived OLB Jackson Jeffcoat.

==== Team re-signings/contract extensions ====
| Date | Player | Position | Contract Type | Notes |
|---|---|---|---|---|
| March 1 | Kirk Cousins | QB | Franchise Tag | 2016 salary worth $19.953 million |
| March 9 | Colt McCoy | QB | Extension | Signed 2 yr, $15m contract with $6.75m guaranteed |
| March 9 | Duke Ihenacho | S | RFA | |
| March 9 | Mason Foster | LB | UFA | Signed 2 yr, $3.5m contract with $1.8m guaranteed |
| March 9 | Kedric Golston | DE | UFA | |
| March 11 | Logan Paulsen | TE | UFA | |
| March 12 | Tress Way | P | RFA | Signed 5 yr, $7.59m contract with $2.95m guaranteed |
| March 15 | Will Blackmon | FS | UFA | |
| March 16 | Junior Galette | OLB | UFA | Signed 1 yr, $1.6m contract |
| March 16 | Josh LeRibeus | C | UFA | |
| March 17 | Chris Thompson | RB | UFA | |

==== Free agency transactions ====
| Date | Player | Position | Previous Team | New Team | Notes |
|---|---|---|---|---|---|
| March 9 | Robert Griffin III | QB | Washington Redskins | Cleveland Browns | Signed 2 yr, $15m contract with $6.75m guaranteed |
| March 9 | Tom Compton | G | Washington Redskins | Atlanta Falcons | |
| March 9 | Alfred Morris | RB | Washington Redskins | Dallas Cowboys | Signed 2 yr, $3.5m contract with $1.8m guaranteed |
| March 9 | Keenan Robinson | ILB | Washington Redskins | New York Giants | |
| March 9 | Terrence Knighton | DT | Washington Redskins | New England Patriots | |
| March 9 | Frank Kearse | DE | Washington Redskins | New England Patriots | |
| March 11 | Kendall Reyes | DE | San Diego Chargers | Washington Redskins | |
| March 15 | David Bruton | SS | Denver Broncos | Washington Redskins | Signed 3 yr, $9.15m contract with $3.4m guaranteed |
| March 17 | Terrence Garvin | ILB | Pittsburgh Steelers | Washington Redskins | |
| March 31 | Vernon Davis | TE | Denver Broncos | Washington Redskins | Signed 1 yr, $2.4m contract with $1.1m guaranteed |
| April 14 | Greg Toler | CB | Indianapolis Colts | Washington Redskins | |
| April 14 | Jackson Jeffcoat | OLB/DE | Washington Redskins | Cleveland Browns | |
| April 18 | Cody Booth | OLB | Jacksonville Jaguars | Washington Redskins | |
| April 22 | Josh Norman | CB | Carolina Panthers | Washington Redskins | Signed 5 yr, $75m contract with $36.5m guaranteed |

== Draft ==
The 2016 NFL draft occurred from April 28 to April 30, 2016. Going into the draft, the Redskins had eight selections, two of which were from another team: the additional seventh-round (#232) selection from the Dashon Goldson trade in 2015 and a sixth-round selection (#187) from the New Orleans Saints (the Redskins sent their sixth-round selection to Tampa Bay as part of the Goldson trade).

During the draft, the Redskins swapped first-round selections (#21 for #22) with the Houston Texans in exchange for their 2017 sixth-round selection, traded their 2016 fourth round selection (#120) to the New Orleans Saints in exchange for the Saints' fifth-round selections in 2016 (#152) and 2017, and traded their fifth-round selection (#158) to the New York Jets in exchange for their 2017 fourth-round selection.

2016 Washington Redskins draft
| Round | Selection | Player | Position | College |
|---|---|---|---|---|
| 1 | 22 | Josh Doctson | WR | TCU |
| 2 | 53 | Su'a Cravens | ILB | USC |
| 3 | 84 | Kendall Fuller | CB | Virginia Tech |
| 4 | 120 | Selection traded to the New Orleans Saints | | |
| 5 | 152 | Matt Ioannidis | DE | Temple |
| 6 | 187 | Nate Sudfeld | QB | Indiana |
| 7 | 232 | Steven Daniels | LB | Boston College |
| 7 | 242 | Keith Marshall | RB | Georgia |

=== Undrafted free agents ===
After the draft, the Redskins signed 14 undrafted college free agents to the team as part of the off season roster:

| Player | Position | College |
|---|---|---|
| Tevin Carter | S | Utah |
| Michael Cooper | TE | Indiana |
| Reginald Diggs | WR | Richmond |
| Ejiro Ederaine | LB | Fresno State |
| Joe Gore | OT | Clemson |
| Maurice Harris | WR | Cal |
| Dominick Jackson | OT | Alabama |
| Joe Kerridge | FB | Michigan |
| Anthony Lanier | DE | Alabama A&M |
| Geno Matias-Smith | DB | Alabama |
| Shiro Davis | LB | Texas |
| Robert Kelley | RB | Tulane |
| Valdez Showers | WR | Florida |

== Staff ==
2016 Washington Redskins staff
| Front office: Owner – Daniel Snyder; President – Bruce Allen; General Manager – Scot McCloughan; Personnel Executive – Doug Williams; Vice President of football administration/General Counsel – Eric Schaffer; Director of player personnel – Scott Campbell; Director of pro personnel – Alex Santos; Director of football operations – Paul Kelly; Director of Sports Medicine – Robin West; Head coaches: Head coach – Jay Gruden; Offensive coaches: Offensive coordinator – Sean McVay; Quarterbacks – Matt Cavanaugh; Running backs – Randy Jordan; Wide receivers – Ike Hilliard; Tight ends – Wes Phillips; Offensive line – Bill Callahan; Assistant offensive line – Kevin Carberry; Offensive quality control – Shane Waldron | Defensive coaches: Defensive coordinator – Joe Barry; Defensive line – Robb Akey; Linebackers – Kirk Olivadotti; Outside linebackers − Greg Manusky; Defensive backs – Perry Fewell; Defensive quality control – Chad Grimm; Defensive quality control – Aubrey Pleasant; Special teams coaches: Special teams coordinator – Ben Kotwica; Assistant special teams – Bradford Banta; Special tams assistant/special projects – Bret Munsey; Strength and conditioning: Director of player development – Malcolm Blacken; Head strength and conditioning – Mike Clark; Assistant strength and conditioning – Chad Englehart; Assistant strength and conditioning/nutritionist – Jake Sankal |

== Final roster ==
2016 Washington Redskins roster
| Quarterbacks (QB): 8 Kirk Cousins; 16 Colt McCoy; 2 Nate Sudfeld; Running backs (RB): 34 Mack Brown; 31 Matt Jones; 32 Robert Kelley; 25 Chris Thompson; Wide receivers (WR): 80 Jamison Crowder; 88 Pierre Garçon; 14 Ryan Grant; 13 Maurice Harris; 11 DeSean Jackson; Tight ends (TE): 89 Derek Carrier; 85 Vernon Davis; 86 Jordan Reed | Offensive linemen (OL): 74 Arie Kouandjio G; 77 Shawn Lauvao G; 78 Kory Lichtensteiger C; 61 Spencer Long C; 76 Morgan Moses T; 79 Ty Nsekhe T; 60 Vinston Painter G; 75 Brandon Scherff G; 56 John Sullivan C; 71 Trent Williams T; Defensive linemen (DL): 92 Chris Baker DE; 90 Ziggy Hood NT; 98 Matt Ioannidis DE; 99 Ricky Jean Francois DE; 73 Cullen Jenkins NT | Linebackers (LB): 51 Will Compton ILB; 54 Mason Foster ILB; 52 Terence Garvin ILB; 91 Ryan Kerrigan OLB; 93 Trent Murphy OLB; 94 Preston Smith OLB; 50 Martrell Spaight ILB; 48 Lynden Trail OLB; 59 Zach Vigil ILB; Defensive backs (DB): 41 Will Blackmon FS; 26 Bashaud Breeland CB; 36 Su'a Cravens SS; 47 Quinton Dunbar CB; 45 Josh Evans FS; 22 Deshazor Everett FS; 38 Kendall Fuller CB; 29 Duke Ihenacho SS; 24 Josh Norman CB; 35 Dashaun Phillips CB; 20 Greg Toler CB; Special teams (ST): 3 Dustin Hopkins K; 57 Nick Sundberg LS; 5 Tress Way P | Practice squad: 69 A. J. Francis NT; 15 Matt Hazel WR; 40 Rufus Johnson OLB; 95 Joey Mbu NT; 62 Ronald Patrick C; 46 Shak Randolph CB; 83 Wes Saxton TE; 37 Tye Smith CB; 87 Kendal Thompson WR; 63 Isaiah Williams T; Reserve: 96 Houston Bates OLB (IR); 72 Kevin Bowen T (IR); 53 Steven Daniels ILB (IR); 17 Reggie Diggs WR (IR); 18 Josh Doctson WR (IR); 58 Junior Galette OLB (NF-Inj.); 64 Kedric Golston NT (IR); 23 DeAngelo Hall FS (IR); 72 Anthony Lanier DE (IR); 39 Keith Marshall RB (IR); 84 Niles Paul TE (IR); 39 Donte Whitner SS (IR); Rookies in italics 53 active, 12 reserve, 10 practice squad |

== Schedule ==
=== Preseason ===
| Week | Date | Opponent | Result | Record | Venue | Recap |
|---|---|---|---|---|---|---|
| 1 | August 11 | at Atlanta Falcons | **L** 17–23 | 0–1 | Georgia Dome | Recap |
| 2 | August 19 | New York Jets | **W** 22–18 | 1–1 | FedExField | Recap |
| 3 | August 26 | Buffalo Bills | **W** 21–16 | 2–1 | FedExField | Recap |
| 4 | August 31 (Note: The Week 4 preseason game against the Tampa Bay Buccaneers at Raymond James Stadium, originally scheduled for September 1, was moved forward to Wednesday, August 31, in an effort to avoid anticipated severe weather from Tropical Depression Nine.) | at Tampa Bay Buccaneers | **W** 20–13 | 3–1 | Raymond James Stadium | Recap |

=== Regular season ===
| Week | Date | Opponent | Result | Record | Venue | Recap |
|---|---|---|---|---|---|---|
| 1 | September 12 | Pittsburgh Steelers | **L** 16–38 | 0–1 | FedExField | Recap |
| 2 | September 18 | **Dallas Cowboys** | **L** 23–27 | 0–2 | FedExField | Recap |
| 3 | September 25 | at **New York Giants** | **W** 29–27 | 1–2 | MetLife Stadium | Recap |
| 4 | October 2 | Cleveland Browns | **W** 31–20 | 2–2 | FedExField | Recap |
| 5 | October 9 | at Baltimore Ravens | **W** 16–10 | 3–2 | M&T Bank Stadium | Recap |
| 6 | October 16 | **Philadelphia Eagles** | **W** 27–20 | 4–2 | FedExField | Recap |
| 7 | October 23 | at Detroit Lions | **L** 17–20 | 4–3 | Ford Field | Recap |
| 8 | October 30 | at Cincinnati Bengals | **T** 27–27 (OT) | 4–3–1 | (United Kingdom) Wembley Stadium (London) | Recap |
| 9 | Bye | | | | | |
| 10 | November 13 | Minnesota Vikings | **W** 26–20 | 5–3–1 | FedExField | Recap |
| 11 | November 20 | Green Bay Packers | **W** 42–24 | 6–3–1 | FedExField | Recap |
| 12 | November 24 | at **Dallas Cowboys** | **L** 26–31 | 6–4–1 | AT&T Stadium | Recap |
| 13 | December 4 | at Arizona Cardinals | **L** 23–31 | 6–5–1 | University of Phoenix Stadium | Recap |
| 14 | December 11 | at **Philadelphia Eagles** | **W** 27–22 | 7–5–1 | Lincoln Financial Field | Recap |
| 15 | December 19 | Carolina Panthers | **L** 15–26 | 7–6–1 | FedExField | Recap |
| 16 | December 24 | at Chicago Bears | **W** 41–21 | 8–6–1 | Soldier Field | Recap |
| 17 | January 1 | **New York Giants** | **L** 10–19 | 8–7–1 | FedExField | Recap |

Note: Intra-division opponents are in bold text.

=== Game summaries ===
==== Week 1: vs. Pittsburgh Steelers ====
Week One: Pittsburgh Steelers at Washington Redskins – Game summary

| Quarter | 1 | 2 | 3 | 4 | Total |
|---|---|---|---|---|---|
| **Steelers** | 0 | 14 | 10 | 14 | **38** |
| Redskins | 6 | 0 | 3 | 7 | **16** |

at FedExField, Landover, Maryland

- Date: September 12
- Game time: 7:10 p.m. EDT
- Game weather: 79 °F (26 °C), clear
- Game attendance: 79,124
- Referee: Craig Wrolstad
- TV announcers (ESPN): Sean McDonough, Jon Gruden and Lisa Salters
- Recap, Gamebook

Game information

**First quarter**

- WAS – Dustin Hopkins 31-yard field goal, 5:56. Redskins 3–0. **Drive: 9 plays, 54 yards, 3:24.**
- WAS – Dustin Hopkins 40-yard field goal, 1:08. Redskins 6–0. **Drive: 5 plays, 14 yards, 2:38.**

**Second quarter**

- PIT – Antonio Brown 29-yard pass from Ben Roethlisberger (Chris Boswell kick), 10:10. Steelers 7–6. **Drive: 11 plays, 75 yards, 5:58.**
- PIT – Eli Rogers 3-yard pass from Ben Roethlisberger (Chris Boswell kick), 0:27. Steelers 14–6. **Drive: 14 plays, 67 yards, 5:52.**

**Third quarter**

- PIT – Chris Boswell 46-yard field goal, 11:18. Steelers 17–6. **Drive: 8 plays, 47 yards, 3:42.**
- PIT – Antonio Brown 26-yard pass from Ben Roethlisberger (Chris Boswell kick), 7:01. Steelers 24–6. **Drive: 5 plays, 75 yards, 2:04.**
- WAS – Dustin Hopkins 34-yard field goal, 2:01. Steelers 24–9. **Drive: 9 plays, 52 yards, 5:00.**

**Fourth quarter**

- WAS – Chris Thompson 1-yard run (Dustin Hopkins kick), 13:01. Steelers 24–16. **Drive: 7 plays, 77 yards, 2:18.**
- PIT – DeAngelo Williams 15-yard run (Chris Boswell kick), 5:48. Steelers 31–16. **Drive: 13 plays, 73 yards, 7:13.**
- PIT – DeAngelo Williams 6-yard run (Chris Boswell kick), 1:54. Steelers 38–16. **Drive: 6 plays, 45 yards, 2:23.**

**Top passers**

- PIT – Ben Roethlisberger – 27/37, 300 yards, 3 TD, INT
- WAS – Kirk Cousins – 30/43, 329 yards, 2 INT

**Top rushers**

- PIT – DeAngelo Williams – 26 rushes, 143 yards, 2 TD
- WAS – Matt Jones – 7 rushes, 24 yards

**Top receivers**

- PIT – Antonio Brown – 8 receptions, 126 yards, 2 TD
- WAS – DeSean Jackson – 6 receptions, 102 yards

The Redskins entered this Week 1 matchup against the Steelers having lost five consecutive games against Pittsburgh dating back to 1991. They scored an average of 8.2 points per game in those five losses. The Redskins' 22-point defeat was their worst in a Week 1 game in 15 years. It was also their worst opening day home loss since 1966.

==== Week 2: vs. Dallas Cowboys ====
Week Two: Dallas Cowboys at Washington Redskins – Game summary

| Quarter | 1 | 2 | 3 | 4 | Total |
|---|---|---|---|---|---|
| **Cowboys** | 10 | 3 | 7 | 7 | **27** |
| Redskins | 0 | 10 | 13 | 0 | **23** |

at FedExField, Landover, Maryland

- Date: September 18
- Game time: 1:00 p.m. EDT
- Game weather: 81 °F (27 °C), sunny
- Game attendance: 80,612
- Referee: Bill Vinovich
- TV announcers (Fox): Kevin Burkhardt, John Lynch and Pam Oliver
- Recap, Gamebook

Game information

**First quarter**

- DAL – Dan Bailey 22-yard field goal, 9:25. Cowboys 3–0. **Drive: 13 plays, 76 yards, 5:35.**
- DAL – Ezekiel Elliott 1-yard run (Dan Bailey kick), 1:39. Cowboys 10–0. **Drive: 9 plays, 94 yards, 5:13.**

**Second quarter**

- WAS – Matt Jones 14-yard run (Dustin Hopkins kick), 13:08. Cowboys 10–7. **Drive: 8 plays, 75 yards, 3:31.**
- DAL – Dan Bailey 31-yard field goal, 4:34. Cowboys 13–7. **Drive: 10 plays, 43 yards, 4:31.**
- WAS – Dustin Hopkins 36-yard field goal, 0:26. Cowboys 13–10. **Drive: 12 plays, 56 yards, 4:08.**

**Third quarter**

- WAS – Jamison Crowder 11-yard pass from Kirk Cousins (Dustin Hopkins kick), 11:16. Redskins 17–13. **Drive: 8 plays, 75 yards, 3:44.**
- DAL – Dak Prescott 6-yard run (Dan Bailey kick), 5:41. Cowboys 20–17. **Drive: 10 plays, 75 yards, 5:35.**
- WAS – Dustin Hopkins 29-yard field goal, 2:06. Tied 20–20. **Drive: 7 plays, 27 yards, 3:35.**
- WAS – Dustin Hopkins 22-yard field goal, 0:04. Redskins 23–20. **Drive: 5 plays, 30 yards, 1:35.**

**Fourth quarter**

- DAL – Alfred Morris 4-yard run (Dan Bailey kick), 4:45. Cowboys 27–23. **Drive: 11 plays, 80 yards, 5:50.**

**Top passers**

- DAL – Dak Prescott – 22/30, 292 yards
- WAS – Kirk Cousins – 28/46, 364 yards, TD, INT

**Top rushers**

- DAL – Ezekiel Elliott – 21 rushes, 83 yards, TD
- WAS – Matt Jones – 13 rushes, 61 yards, TD

**Top receivers**

- DAL – Dez Bryant – 7 receptions, 102 yards
- WAS – Jordan Reed – 5 receptions, 70 yards

==== Week 3: at New York Giants ====
Week Three: Washington Redskins at New York Giants – Game summary

| Quarter | 1 | 2 | 3 | 4 | Total |
|---|---|---|---|---|---|
| **Redskins** | 6 | 10 | 7 | 6 | **29** |
| Giants | 14 | 7 | 3 | 3 | **27** |

at MetLife Stadium, East Rutherford, New Jersey

- Date: September 25
- Game time: 1:00 p.m. EDT
- Game weather: 67 °F (19 °C), sunny
- Game attendance: 78,368
- Referee: John Hussey
- TV announcers (Fox): Joe Buck, Troy Aikman and Erin Andrews
- Recap, Gamebook

Game information

**First quarter**

- NYG – Shane Vereen 1-yard run (Josh Brown kick), 12:18. Giants 7–0. **Drive: 3 plays, 28 yards, 1:05.**
- WAS – Dustin Hopkins 49-yard field goal, 9:35. Giants 7–3. **Drive: 7 plays, 29 yards, 2:43.**
- NYG – Sterling Shepard 23-yard pass from Eli Manning (Josh Brown kick), 6:10. Giants 14–3. **Drive: 8 plays, 75 yards, 3:25.**
- WAS – Dustin Hopkins 33-yard field goal, 0:25. Giants 14–6. **Drive: 11 plays, 60 yards, 5:45.**

**Second quarter**

- WAS – Dustin Hopkins 45-yard field goal, 8:34. Giants 14–9. **Drive: 7 plays, 9 yards, 3:58.**
- NYG – Orleans Darkwa 2-yard run (Josh Brown kick), 4:12. Giants 21–9. **Drive: 8 plays, 75 yards, 4:22.**
- WAS – DeSean Jackson 44-yard pass from Kirk Cousins (Dustin Hopkins kick), 3:40. Giants 21–16. **Drive: 2 plays, 75 yards, 0:32.**

**Third quarter**

- WAS – Jamison Crowder 55-yard pass from Kirk Cousins (Dustin Hopkins kick), 9:45. Redskins 23–21. **Drive: 3 plays, 50 yards, 1:17.**
- NYG – Josh Brown 29-yard field goal, 6:29. Giants 24–23. **Drive: 9 plays, 64 yards, 3:16.**

**Fourth quarter**

- WAS – Dustin Hopkins 25-yard field goal, 14:57. Redskins 26–24. **Drive: 15 plays, 68 yards, 6:32.**
- NYG – Josh Brown 30-yard field goal, 7:53. Giants 27–26. **Drive: 9 plays, 58 yards, 3:07.**
- WAS – Dustin Hopkins 37-yard field goal, 1:51. Redskins 29–27. **Drive: 10 plays, 56 yards, 6:02.**

**Top passers**

- WAS – Kirk Cousins – 21/35, 296 yards, 2 TD
- NYG – Eli Manning – 25/38, 350 yards, TD, 2 INT

**Top rushers**

- WAS – Matt Jones – 17 rushes, 65 yards
- NYG – Shane Vereen – 11 rushes, 67 yards, TD

**Top receivers**

- WAS – DeSean Jackson – 5 receptions, 96 yards, TD
- NYG – Odell Beckham Jr. – 7 receptions, 121 yards

With the win, the Redskins improved 1–2 and won at MetLife Stadium for the first time since 2011.

==== Week 4: vs. Cleveland Browns ====
Week Four: Cleveland Browns at Washington Redskins – Game summary

| Quarter | 1 | 2 | 3 | 4 | Total |
|---|---|---|---|---|---|
| Browns | 0 | 17 | 3 | 0 | **20** |
| **Redskins** | 14 | 3 | 0 | 14 | **31** |

at FedExField, Landover, Maryland

- Date: October 2
- Game time: 1:00 p.m. EDT
- Game weather: 67 °F (19 °C), cloudy
- Game attendance: 76,249
- Referee: Jeff Triplette
- TV announcers (CBS): Kevin Harlan and Rich Gannon
- Recap, Gamebook

Game information

**First quarter**

- WAS – Jordan Reed 8-yard pass from Kirk Cousins (Dustin Hopkins kick), 7:40. Redskins 7–0. **Drive: 12 plays, 75 yards, 7:20.**
- WAS – Jordan Reed 9-yard pass from Kirk Cousins (Dustin Hopkins kick), 0:27. Redskins 14–0. **Drive: 8 plays, 80 yards, 4:14.**

**Second quarter**

- CLE – Isaiah Crowell 2-yard run (Cody Parkey kick), 9:33. Redskins 14–7. **Drive: 12 plays, 81 yards, 5:54.**
- CLE – Terrelle Pryor 9-yard pass from Cody Kessler (Cody Parkey kick), 7:55. Tied 14–14. **Drive: 3 plays, 12 yards, 1:25.**
- WAS – Dustin Hopkins 49-yard field goal, 2:29. Redskins 17–14. **Drive: 10 plays, 32 yards, 5:26.**
- CLE – Cody Parkey 51-yard field goal, 0:00. Tied 17–17. **Drive: 7 plays, 42 yards, 2:29.**

**Third quarter**

- CLE – Cody Parkey 45-yard field goal, 9:25. Browns 20–17. **Drive: 11 plays, 48 yards, 5:35.**

**Fourth quarter**

- WAS – Chris Thompson 5-yard pass from Kirk Cousins (Dustin Hopkins kick), 10:39. Redskins 24–20' Drive: 10 plays, 91 yards, 5:28
- WAS – Matt Jones 1-yard run (Dustin Hopkins kick), 4:25. Redskins 31–20. **Drive: 4 plays, 39 yards, 2:03.**

**Top passers**

- CLE – Cody Kessler – 28/40, 223 yards, TD, INT
- WAS – Kirk Cousins – 21/27, 183 yards, 3 TD, INT

**Top rushers**

- CLE – Isaiah Crowell – 15 rushes, 112 yards, TD
- WAS – Matt Jones – 22 rushes, 117 yards, TD

**Top receivers**

- CLE – Gary Barnidge – 7 receptions, 57 yards
- WAS – Jordan Reed – 9 receptions, 73 yards, 2 TD

==== Week 5: at Baltimore Ravens ====
Week Five: Washington Redskins at Baltimore Ravens – Game summary

| Quarter | 1 | 2 | 3 | 4 | Total |
|---|---|---|---|---|---|
| **Redskins** | 6 | 0 | 10 | 0 | **16** |
| Ravens | 7 | 3 | 0 | 0 | **10** |

at M&T Bank Stadium, Baltimore, Maryland

- Date: October 9
- Game time: 1:00 p.m. EDT
- Game weather: 62 °F (17 °C), partly cloudy
- Game attendance: 71,318
- Referee: Ronald Torbert
- TV announcers (Fox): Sam Rosen, Daryl Johnston and Laura Okmin
- Recap, Gamebook

Game information

**First quarter**

- BAL – Crockett Gillmore 7-yard pass from Joe Flacco (Justin Tucker kick), 10:13. Ravens 7–0. **Drive: 9 plays, 75 yards, 4:47.**
- WAS – Jamison Crowder 85-yard punt return (kick failed, hit left upright), 4:52. Ravens 7–6.

**Second quarter**

- BAL – Justin Tucker 43-yard field goal, 14:56. Ravens 10–6. **Drive: 12 plays, 71 yards, 4:56.**

**Third quarter**

- WAS – Pierre Garçon 21-yard pass from Kirk Cousins (Dustin Hopkins kick), 8:28. Redskins 13–10. **Drive: 3 plays, 50 yards, 1:33.**
- WAS – Dustin Hopkins 37-yard field goal, 0:14. Redskins 16–10. **Drive: 11 plays, 72 yards, 5:55.**

**Fourth quarter**

- No scoring plays

**Top passers**

- WAS – Kirk Cousins – 29/41, 260 yards, TD, INT
- BAL – Joe Flacco – 30/46, 210 yards, TD

**Top rushers**

- WAS – Matt Jones – 14 rushes, 31 yards
- BAL – Terrance West – 11 rushes, 95 yards

**Top receivers**

- WAS – Pierre Garçon – 5 receptions, 56 yards, TD
- BAL – Mike Wallace – 7 receptions, 63 yards

==== Week 6: vs. Philadelphia Eagles ====
Week Six: Philadelphia Eagles at Washington Redskins – Game summary

| Quarter | 1 | 2 | 3 | 4 | Total |
|---|---|---|---|---|---|
| Eagles | 0 | 14 | 0 | 6 | **20** |
| **Redskins** | 7 | 14 | 3 | 3 | **27** |

at FedExField, Landover, Maryland

- Date: October 16
- Game time: 1:00 p.m. EDT
- Game weather: 69 °F (21 °C), sunny
- Game attendance: 78,934
- Referee: John Parry
- TV announcers (Fox): Kenny Albert, John Lynch and Pam Oliver
- Recap, Gamebook

Game information

**First quarter**

- WAS – Jamison Crowder 16-yard pass from Kirk Cousins (Dustin Hopkins kick), 0:51. Redskins 7–0. **Drive: 3 plays, 71 yards, 1:31.**

**Second quarter**

- WAS – Vernon Davis 13-yard pass from Kirk Cousins (Dustin Hopkins kick), 7:48. Redskins 14–0. **Drive: 9 plays, 90 yards, 5:31.**
- PHI – Wendell Smallwood 86-yard kickoff return (Caleb Sturgis kick), 7:37. Redskins 14–7. **Drive: 0 plays, 0 yards, 0:11.**
- PHI – Malcolm Jenkins 62-yard interception return (Caleb Sturgis kick), 3:55. Tied 14–14.
- WAS – Matt Jones 1-yard run (Dustin Hopkins kick), 0:06. Redskins 21–14. **Drive: 13 plays, 75 yards, 3:49.**

**Third quarter**

- WAS – Dustin Hopkins 32-yard field goal, 8:40. Redskins 24–14. **Drive: 12 plays, 65 yards, 6:20.**

**Fourth quarter**

- PHI – Caleb Sturgis 38-yard field goal, 12:57. Redskins 24–17. **Drive: 9 plays, 70 yards, 3:50.**
- WAS – Dustin Hopkins 50-yard field goal, 9:43. Redskins 27–17. **Drive: 7 plays, 58 yards, 3:13.**
- PHI – Caleb Sturgis 28-yard field goal, 5:20. Redskins 27–20. **Drive: 8 plays, 69 yards, 4:23.**

**Top passers**

- PHI – Carson Wentz – 11/22, 179 yards
- WAS – Kirk Cousins – 18/34, 263 yards, 2 TD, INT

**Top rushers**

- PHI – Ryan Mathews – 9 rushes, 60 yards
- WAS – Matt Jones – 16 rushes, 135 yards, TD

**Top receivers**

- PHI – Jordan Matthews – 3 receptions, 75 yards
- WAS – Pierre Garçon – 6 receptions, 77 yards

==== Week 7: at Detroit Lions ====
Week Seven: Washington Redskins at Detroit Lions – Game summary

| Quarter | 1 | 2 | 3 | 4 | Total |
|---|---|---|---|---|---|
| Redskins | 0 | 3 | 0 | 14 | **17** |
| **Lions** | 0 | 3 | 7 | 10 | **20** |

at Ford Field, Detroit, Michigan

- Date: October 23
- Game time: 1:00 p.m. EDT
- Game weather: Played indoors (dome stadium)
- Game attendance: 60,461
- Referee: Walt Coleman
- TV announcers (Fox): Justin Kutcher, Charles Davis, Chris Spielman and Peter Schrager
- Recap, Gamebook

Game information

**First quarter**

- No scoring plays

**Second quarter**

- DET – Matt Prater 43-yard field goal, 9:37. Lions 3–0. **Drive: 10 plays, 55 yards, 5:43.**
- WAS – Dustin Hopkins 38-yard field goal, 0:00. Tied 3–3. **Drive: 10 plays, 51 yards, 3:17.**

**Third quarter**

- DET – Zach Zenner 1-yard run (Matt Prater kick), 7:20. Lions 10–3. **Drive: 7 plays, 86 yards, 2:53.**

**Fourth quarter**

- DET – Matt Prater 27-yard field goal, 13:10. Lions 13–3. **Drive: 10 plays, 53 yards, 5:12.**
- WAS – Robert Kelley 1-yard pass from Kirk Cousins (Dustin Hopkins kick), 8:20. Lions 13–10. **Drive: 9 plays, 75 yards, 4:50.**
- WAS – Kirk Cousins 19-yard run (Dustin Hopkins kick), 1:05. Redskins 17–13. **Drive: 9 plays, 76 yards, 4:15.**
- DET – Anquan Boldin 18-yard pass from Matthew Stafford (Matt Prater kick), 0:16. Lions 20–17. **Drive: 6 plays, 75 yards, 0:49.**

**Top passers**

- WAS – Kirk Cousins – 30/39, 301 yards, TD
- DET – Matthew Stafford – 18/29, 266 yards, TD

**Top rushers**

- WAS – Chris Thompson – 12 rushes, 79 yards
- DET – Justin Forsett – 8 rushes, 33 yards

**Top receivers**

- WAS – Jamison Crowder – 7 receptions, 108 yards
- DET – Marvin Jones – 4 receptions, 94 yards

The Redskins rallied with a late touchdown run by Cousins, but the Lions responded with Matthew Stafford throwing the game winner to Anquan Boldin, thus ending the Redskins winning streak.

==== Week 8: at Cincinnati Bengals ====
NFL International Series

Week Eight: Washington Redskins at Cincinnati Bengals – Game summary

| Quarter | 1 | 2 | 3 | 4 | OT | Total |
|---|---|---|---|---|---|---|
| Redskins | 7 | 3 | 7 | 10 | 0 | **27** |
| Bengals | 7 | 0 | 13 | 7 | 0 | **27** |

at Wembley Stadium, London, United Kingdom

- Date: October 30
- Game time: 1:30 p.m. BST/9:30 a.m. EDT
- Game weather: 54 °F (12 °C), cloudy
- Game attendance: 84,488
- Referee: Carl Cheffers
- TV announcers (Fox): Kenny Albert, John Lynch and Pam Oliver
- Recap, Gamebook

Game information

**First quarter**

- WAS – Robert Kelley 4-yard run (Dustin Hopkins kick), 7:38. Redskins 7–0. **Drive: 15 plays, 80 yards, 7:22.**
- CIN – Giovani Bernard 8-yard run (Mike Nugent kick), 3:51. Tied 7–7. **Drive: 7 plays, 36 yards, 3:47.**

**Second quarter**

- WAS – Dustin Hopkins 20-yard field goal, 8:16. Redskins 10–7. **Drive: 9 plays, 77 yards, 4:04.**

**Third quarter**

- CIN – Tyler Eifert 15-yard pass from Andy Dalton (kick failed, wide left), 10:42. Bengals 13–10. **Drive: 11 plays, 75 yards, 4:18.**
- CIN – Andy Dalton 1-yard run (Mike Nugent kick), 5:15. Bengals 20–10. **Drive: 10 plays, 64 yards, 3:58.**
- WAS – Jordan Reed 23-yard pass from Kirk Cousins (Dustin Hopkins kick), 3:02. Bengals 20–17. **Drive: 5 plays, 91 yards, 2:13.**

**Fourth quarter**

- WAS – Jamison Crowder 33-yard pass from Kirk Cousins (Dustin Hopkins kick), 9:30. Redskins 24–20. **Drive: 7 plays, 83 yards, 4:18.**
- CIN – Jeremy Hill 1-yard run (Mike Nugent kick), 6:54. Bengals 27–24. **Drive: 6 plays, 75 yards, 2:36.**
- WAS – Dustin Hopkins 40-yard field goal, 1:07. Tied 27–27. **Drive: 10 plays, 45 yards, 2:08.**

**Overtime**

- No scoring plays

**Top passers**

- WAS – Kirk Cousins – 38/56, 458 yards, 2 TD, INT
- CIN – Andy Dalton – 27/42, 284 yards, TD, INT

**Top rushers**

- WAS – Robert Kelley – 21 rushes, 87 yards, TD
- CIN – Jeremy Hill – 20 rushes, 76 yards, TD

**Top receivers**

- WAS – Jamison Crowder – 9 receptions, 107 yards, TD
- CIN – A. J. Green – 9 receptions, 121 yards

Hoping to rebound from their loss to the Detroit Lions, the Redskins played in the third and final game of the year in London against the Cincinnati Bengals. With a few minutes left in overtime, Dustin Hopkins missed a game-winning field goal and allowed the Bengals to take over. After that, Bengals' Andy Dalton fumbled and allowed the Redskins to take back the ball. A Hail Mary attempt failed, making the Redskins tie for the first time since 1997 when they tied 7–7 against the Giants.

==== Week 10: vs. Minnesota Vikings ====
Week Ten: Minnesota Vikings at Washington Redskins – Game Summary

| Quarter | 1 | 2 | 3 | 4 | Total |
|---|---|---|---|---|---|
| Vikings | 0 | 20 | 0 | 0 | **20** |
| **Redskins** | 7 | 7 | 6 | 6 | **26** |

at FedExField, Landover, Maryland

- Date: November 13
- Game time: 1:00 p.m. EST
- Game weather: 58 °F (14 °C), sunny
- Game attendance: 78,216
- Referee: Pete Morelli
- TV announcers (Fox): Dick Stockton, Chris Spielman and Kristina Pink
- Recap, Gamebook

Game information

**First quarter**

- WAS – Jamison Crowder 4-yard pass from Kirk Cousins (Dustin Hopkins kick), 9:04. Redskins 7–0. **Drive: 10 plays, 68 yards, 4:19.**

**Second quarter**

- WAS – Vernon Davis 38-yard pass from Kirk Cousins (Dustin Hopkins kick), 14:18. Redskins 14–0. **Drive: 9 plays, 91 yards, 4:58.**
- MIN – Matt Asiata 1-yard run (Blair Walsh kick), 5:39. Redskins 14–7. **Drive: 8 plays, 67 yards, 3:52.**
- MIN – Kyle Rudolph 20-yard pass from Sam Bradford (Blair Walsh kick), 0:58. Tied 14–14. **Drive: 7 plays, 75 yards, 2:40.**
- MIN – Adam Thielen 3-yard pass from Sam Bradford (kick wide right), 0:00. Vikings 20–14. **Drive: 4 plays, 33 yards, 0:50.**

**Third quarter**

- WAS – Dustin Hopkins 30-yard field goal, 8:53. Vikings 20–17. **Drive: 12 plays, 55 yards, 6:07.**
- WAS – Dustin Hopkins 37-yard field goal, 0:38. Tied 20–20. **Drive: 11 plays, 49 yards, 5:16.**

**Fourth quarter**

- WAS – Dustin Hopkins 50-yard field goal, 9:33. Redskins 23–20. **Drive: 7 plays, 60 yards, 3:21.**
- WAS – Dustin Hopkins 28-yard field goal, 2:31. Redskins 26–20. **Drive: 8 plays, 32 yards, 3:13.**

**Top passers**

- MIN – Sam Bradford – 31/40, 307 yards, 2 TD, INT
- WAS – Kirk Cousins – 22/33, 262 yards, 2 TD

**Top rushers**

- MIN – Jerick McKinnon – 6 rushes, 16 yards
- WAS – Robert Kelley – 22 rushes, 97 yards

**Top receivers**

- MIN – Stefon Diggs – 13 receptions, 164 yards
- WAS – Pierre Garçon – 6 receptions, 81 yards

After their tie against the Bengals and their bye week, the Redskins came back home to host the Minnesota Vikings on Homecoming Weekend. After allowing the Vikings to score 20 unanswered points to end the first half, the Redskins shut out the Vikings 12–0 in the second half, improving to 5–3–1 on the season.

==== Week 11: vs. Green Bay Packers ====
Week Eleven: Green Bay Packers at Washington Redskins – Game summary

| Quarter | 1 | 2 | 3 | 4 | Total |
|---|---|---|---|---|---|
| Packers | 0 | 10 | 0 | 14 | **24** |
| **Redskins** | 7 | 6 | 9 | 20 | **42** |

at FedExField, Landover, Maryland

- Date: November 20
- Game time: 8:30 p.m. EST
- Game weather: 38 °F (3 °C), clear
- Game attendance: 77,137
- Referee: John Hussey
- TV announcers (NBC): Mike Tirico, Cris Collinsworth and Michele Tafoya
- Recap, Gamebook

Game information

**First quarter**

- WAS – DeSean Jackson 17-yard pass from Kirk Cousins (Dustin Hopkins kick), 3:03. Redskins 7–0. **Drive: 8 plays, 55 yards, 3:52.**

**Second quarter**

- GB – Jordy Nelson 13-yard pass from Aaron Rodgers (Mason Crosby kick), 9:34. Tied 7–7. **Drive: 17 plays, 75 yards, 8:29.**
- GB – Mason Crosby 36-yard field goal, 3:41. Packers 10–7. **Drive: 9 plays, 38 yards, 5:22.**
- WAS – Robert Kelley 6-yard run (run failed), 0:45. Redskins 13–10. **Drive: 8 plays, 75 yards, 2:58.**

**Third quarter**

- WAS – Dustin Hopkins 37-yard field goal, 9:28. Redskins 16–10. **Drive: 9 plays, 53 yards, 5:37.**
- WAS – Jamison Crowder 44-yard pass from Kirk Cousins (run failed), 2:07. Redskins 22–10. **Drive: 7 plays, 74 yards, 3:34.**

**Fourth quarter**

- GB – James Starks 31-yard pass from Aaron Rodgers (Mason Crosby kick), 15:00. Redskins 22–17. **Drive: 6 plays, 75 yards, 2:09.**
- WAS – Pierre Garçon 70-yard pass from Kirk Cousins (Dustin Hopkins kick), 14:36. Redskins 29–17. **Drive: 2 plays, 75 yards, 0:26.**
- GB – Jared Cook 6-yard pass from Aaron Rodgers (Mason Crosby kick), 10:08. Redskins 29–24. **Drive: 8 plays, 82 yards, 4:21.**
- WAS – Robert Kelley 1-yard run (kick failed, hit right upright), 3:59. Redskins 35–24. **Drive: 11 plays, 81 yards, 6:10.**
- WAS – Robert Kelley 4-yard run (Dustin Hopkins kick), 2:30. Redskins 42–24. **Drive: 3 plays, 72 yards, 0:33.**

**Top passers**

- GB – Aaron Rodgers – 26/41, 351 yards, 3 TD
- WAS – Kirk Cousins – 21/30, 375 yards, 3 TD

**Top rushers**

- GB – Aaron Rodgers – 3 rushes, 33 yards
- WAS – Robert Kelley – 24 rushes, 137 yards, 3 TD

**Top receivers**

- GB – Jared Cook – 6 receptions, 105 yards, TD
- WAS – Pierre Garçon – 6 receptions, 116 yards, TD

The Redskins avenged their 35–18 loss to the Packers in the wildcard round of last season's playoffs by beating them 42–24. They also were the last team to beat the Packers, as they went on a 6-game winning streak to finish the season.

==== Week 12: at Dallas Cowboys ====
Thanksgiving Day game

Week Twelve: Washington Redskins at Dallas Cowboys – Game summary

| Quarter | 1 | 2 | 3 | 4 | Total |
|---|---|---|---|---|---|
| Redskins | 0 | 6 | 0 | 20 | **26** |
| **Cowboys** | 7 | 10 | 0 | 14 | **31** |

at AT&T Stadium, Arlington, Texas

- Date: November 24
- Game time: 4:30 p.m. EST/3:30 p.m. CST
- Game weather: Played indoors (retractable roof closed)
- Game attendance: 93,099
- Referee: Craig Wrolstad
- TV announcers (Fox): Joe Buck, Troy Aikman, Erin Andrews and Chris Myers
- Recap, Gamebook

Game information

**First quarter**

- DAL – Ezekiel Elliott 4-yard run (Dan Bailey kick), 11:09. Cowboys 7–0. **Drive: 7 plays, 75 yards, 3:51.**

**Second quarter**

- WAS – Dustin Hopkins 24-yard field goal, 14:04. Cowboys 7–3. **Drive: 10 plays, 75 yards, 4:10.**
- DAL – Dan Bailey 46-yard field goal, 7:57. Cowboys 10–3. **Drive: 12 plays, 47 yards, 6:07.**
- DAL – Terrance Williams 10-yard pass from Dak Prescott (Dan Bailey kick), 1:45. Cowboys 17–3. **Drive: 6 plays, 55 yards, 2:06.**
- WAS – Dustin Hopkins 20-yard field goal, 0:03. Cowboys 17–6. **Drive: 11 plays, 73 yards, 1:43.**

**Third quarter**

- None

**Fourth quarter**

- WAS – Jordan Reed 5-yard pass from Kirk Cousins (pass failed), 14:54. Cowboys 17–12. **Drive: 14 plays, 90 yards, 7:55.**
- DAL – Dak Prescott 6-yard run (Dan Bailey kick), 10:49. Cowboys 24–12. **Drive: 7 plays, 75 yards, 4:05.**
- WAS – DeSean Jackson 67-yard pass from Kirk Cousins (Dustin Hopkins kick), 9:22. Cowboys 24–19. **Drive: 3 plays, 75 yards, 1:27.**
- DAL – Ezekiel Elliott 1-yard run (Dan Bailey kick), 6:29. Cowboys 31–19. **Drive: 8 plays, 53 yards, 2:53.**
- WAS – Jordan Reed 8-yard pass from Kirk Cousins (Dustin Hopkins kick), 1:53. Cowboys 31–26. **Drive: 15 plays, 75 yards, 4:36.**

**Top passers**

- WAS – Kirk Cousins – 41/53, 449 yards, 3 TD
- DAL – Dak Prescott – 17/24, 195 yards, TD

**Top rushers**

- WAS – Robert Kelley – 14 rushes, 37 yards
- DAL – Ezekiel Elliott – 20 rushes, 97 yards, 2 TD

**Top receivers**

- WAS – DeSean Jackson – 4 receptions, 118 yards, TD
- DAL – Dez Bryant – 5 receptions, 72 yards

An attempted rally by the offense did not pay off. The Redskins dropped to 6–4–1 and were swept by the Cowboys for the first time since 2013.

==== Week 13: at Arizona Cardinals ====
Week Thirteen: Washington Redskins at Arizona Cardinals – Game summary

| Quarter | 1 | 2 | 3 | 4 | Total |
|---|---|---|---|---|---|
| Redskins | 0 | 6 | 14 | 3 | **23** |
| **Cardinals** | 7 | 3 | 7 | 14 | **31** |

at University of Phoenix Stadium, Glendale, Arizona

- Date: December 4
- Game time: 4:25 p.m. EST/2:25 p.m. MST
- Game weather: Played indoors (retractable roof closed)
- Game attendance: 64,939
- Referee: Walt Anderson
- TV announcers (Fox): Dick Stockton, Chris Spielman and Kristina Pink
- Recap, Gamebook

Game information

**First quarter**

- ARI – David Johnson 1-yard run (Chandler Catanzaro kick), 6:43. Cardinals 7–0. **Drive: 15 plays, 75 yards, 8:17.**

**Second quarter**

- WAS – Dustin Hopkins 47-yard field goal, 9:48. Cardinals 7–3. **Drive: 7 plays, 40 yards, 3:33.**
- WAS – Dustin Hopkins 20-yard field goal, 1:52. Cardinals 7–6. **Drive: 11 plays, 47 yards, 5:26.**
- ARI – Chandler Catanzaro 28-yard field goal, 0:07. Cardinals 10–6. **Drive: 12 plays, 65 yards, 1:45.**

**Third quarter**

- WAS – Kirk Cousins 1-yard run (Dustin Hopkins kick), 12:36. Redskins 13–10. **Drive: 5 plays, 74 yards, 2:24.**
- ARI – Michael Floyd 6-yard pass from Carson Palmer (Chandler Catanzaro kick), 4:10. Cardinals 17–13. **Drive: 3 plays, 10 yards, 0:51.**
- WAS – Jamison Crowder 26-yard pass from Kirk Cousins (Dustin Hopkins kick), 1:06. Redskins 20–17. **Drive: 8 plays, 75 yards, 3:04.**

**Fourth quarter**

- ARI – David Johnson 25-yard pass from Carson Palmer (Chandler Catanzaro kick), 11:09. Cardinals 24–20. **Drive: 10 plays, 75 yards, 4:57.**
- WAS – Dustin Hopkins 53-yard field goal, 6:01. Cardinals 24–23. **Drive: 10 plays, 40 yards, 5:08.**
- ARI – J. J. Nelson 42-yard pass from Carson Palmer (Chandler Catanzaro kick), 1:56. Cardinals 31–23. **Drive: 8 plays, 75 yards, 4:05.**

**Top passers**

- WAS – Kirk Cousins – 21/37, 271 yards, TD, INT
- ARI – Carson Palmer – 30/46, 300 yards, 3 TD

**Top rushers**

- WAS – Robert Kelley – 14 rushes, 63 yards
- ARI – David Johnson – 18 rushes, 84 yards, TD

**Top receivers**

- WAS – Pierre Garçon – 7 receptions, 78 yards
- ARI – David Johnson – 9 receptions, 91 yards, TD

Kirk Cousins attempted to drive down the field but was intercepted by Patrick Peterson to seal the second straight loss for the Washington Redskins. With the loss, the 'Skins dropped to 6–5–1 and allowed the Cowboys to clinch a playoff spot by virtue of the loss.

==== Week 14: at Philadelphia Eagles ====
Week Fourteen: Washington Redskins at Philadelphia Eagles – Game summary

| Quarter | 1 | 2 | 3 | 4 | Total |
|---|---|---|---|---|---|
| **Redskins** | 0 | 7 | 14 | 6 | **27** |
| Eagles | 3 | 10 | 0 | 9 | **22** |

at Lincoln Financial Field, Philadelphia, Pennsylvania

- Date: December 11
- Game time: 1:00 p.m. EST
- Game weather: 35 °F (2 °C), cloudy
- Game attendance: 69,596
- Referee: Tony Corrente
- TV announcers (Fox): Kevin Burkhardt, John Lynch and Pam Oliver
- Recap, Gamebook

Game information

**First quarter**

- PHI – Caleb Sturgis 45-yard field goal, 9:46. Eagles 3–0. **Drive: 10 plays, 46 yards, 5:14.**

**Second quarter**

- PHI – Caleb Sturgis 36-yard field goal, 10:29. Eagles 6–0. **Drive: 10 plays, 53 yards, 5:36.**
- WAS – Robert Kelley 22-yard run (Dustin Hopkins kick), 4:11. Redskins 7–6. **Drive: 10 plays, 69 yards, 6:18.**
- PHI – Darren Sproles 4-yard pass from Carson Wentz (Caleb Sturgis kick), 0:28. Eagles 13–7. **Drive: 12 plays, 77 yards, 3:43.**

**Third quarter**

- WAS – DeSean Jackson 80-yard pass from Kirk Cousins (Dustin Hopkins kick), 9:14. Redskins 14–13. **Drive: 2 plays, 81 yards, 0:43.**
- WAS – Pierre Garçon 15-yard pass from Kirk Cousins (Dustin Hopkins kick), 0:07. Redskins 21–13. **Drive: 6 plays, 54 yards, 3:14.**

**Fourth quarter**

- PHI – Leodis McKelvin 29-yard interception return (pass failed), 13:11. Redskins 21–19.
- PHI – Caleb Sturgis 41-yard field goal, 4:59. Eagles 22–21. **Drive: 11 plays, 37 yards, 6:28.**
- WAS – Chris Thompson 25-yard run (pass failed), 1:53. Redskins 27–22. **Drive: 8 plays, 77 yards, 3:06.**

**Top passers**

- WAS – Kirk Cousins – 14/21, 234 yards, 2 TD, INT
- PHI – Carson Wentz – 32/46, 314 yards, TD, INT

**Top rushers**

- WAS – Robert Kelley – 16 rushes, 63 yards, TD
- PHI – Ryan Mathews – 15 rushes, 60 yards

**Top receivers**

- WAS – DeSean Jackson – 3 receptions, 102 yards, TD
- PHI – Zach Ertz – 10 receptions, 112 yards

The Redskins rebounded from a disappointing loss at Arizona to break their two-game losing streak. Chris Thompson scored the game-winning touchdown, while Ryan Kerrigan sealed the game with a strip sack of Carson Wentz. Washington would not sweep the Eagles again until 2020.

==== Week 15: vs. Carolina Panthers ====
Week Fifteen: Carolina Panthers at Washington Redskins – Game summary

| Quarter | 1 | 2 | 3 | 4 | Total |
|---|---|---|---|---|---|
| **Panthers** | 10 | 3 | 10 | 3 | **26** |
| Redskins | 3 | 6 | 0 | 6 | **15** |

at FedExField, Landover, Maryland

- Date: December 19
- Game time: 8:30 p.m. EST
- Game weather: 32 °F (0 °C), clear
- Game attendance: 76,689
- Referee: Walt Coleman
- TV announcers (ESPN): Sean McDonough, Jon Gruden and Lisa Salters
- Recap, Gamebook

Game information

**First quarter**

- CAR – Graham Gano 35-yard field goal, 12:40. Panthers 3–0. **Drive: 7 plays, 58 yards, 2:20.**
- WAS – Dustin Hopkins 43-yard field goal, 6:18. Tied 3–3. **Drive: 8 plays, 38 yards, 3:52.**
- CAR – Ted Ginn Jr. 30-yard pass from Cam Newton (Graham Gano kick), 1:50. Panthers 10–3. **Drive: 8 plays, 84 yards, 4:28.**

**Second quarter**

- CAR – Graham Gano 23-yard field goal, 12:21. Panthers 13–3. **Drive: 6 plays, 19 yards, 3:07.**
- WAS – Robert Kelley 5-yard run (kick failed, wide left), 3:43. Panthers 13–9. **Drive: 7 plays, 89 yards, 4:54.**

**Third quarter**

- CAR – Mike Tolbert 1-yard pass from Cam Newton (Graham Gano kick), 13:58. Panthers 20–9. **Drive: 2 plays, 1 yard, 0:49.**
- CAR – Graham Gano 23-yard field goal, 5:07. Panthers 23–9. **Drive: 8 plays, 65 yards, 3:57.**

**Fourth quarter**

- WAS – Dustin Hopkins 26-yard field goal, 14:08. Panthers 23–12. **Drive: 13 plays, 67 yards, 5:59.**
- WAS – Dustin Hopkins 34-yard field goal, 3:44. Panthers 23–15. **Drive: 9 plays, 56 yards, 1:53.**
- CAR – Graham Gano 41-yard field goal, 1:07. Panthers 26–15. **Drive: 7 plays, 48 yards, 2:37.**

**Top passers**

- CAR – Cam Newton – 21/37, 300 yards, 2 TD
- WAS – Kirk Cousins – 32/47, 315 yards, INT

**Top rushers**

- CAR – Jonathan Stewart – 25 rushes, 132 yards
- WAS – Kirk Cousins – 2 rushes, 11 yards

**Top receivers**

- CAR – Greg Olsen – 6 receptions, 85 yards
- WAS – DeSean Jackson – 7 receptions, 111 yards

Josh Norman's revenge against his former team came up short in an abysmal Monday Night performance by the Redskins.

==== Week 16: at Chicago Bears ====
Week Sixteen: Washington Redskins at Chicago Bears – Game summary

| Quarter | 1 | 2 | 3 | 4 | Total |
|---|---|---|---|---|---|
| **Redskins** | 14 | 10 | 7 | 10 | **41** |
| Bears | 0 | 14 | 0 | 7 | **21** |

at Soldier Field, Chicago, Illinois

- Date: December 24
- Game time: 1:00 p.m. EST/12:00 p.m. CST
- Game weather: 37 °F (3 °C) cloudy, steady temps
- Game attendance: 57,953
- Referee: Brad Allen
- TV announcers (Fox): Dick Stockton, David Diehl and Kristina Pink
- Recap, Gamebook

Game information

**First quarter**

- WAS – Chris Thompson 7-yard run (Dustin Hopkins kick), 7:43. Redskins 7–0. **Drive: 8 plays, 65 yards, 3:35.**
- WAS – Chris Thompson 17-yard pass from Kirk Cousins (Dustin Hopkins kick), 0:57. Redskins 14–0. **Drive: 5 plays, 80 yards, 2:35.**

**Second quarter**

- WAS – Dustin Hopkins 29-yard field goal, 10:07. Redskins 17–0. **Drive: 9 plays, 88 yards, 4:40.**
- CHI – Jeremy Langford 1-yard run (Connor Barth kick), 6:20. Redskins 17–7. **Drive: 8 plays, 75 yards, 3:47.**
- WAS – Kirk Cousins 9-yard run (Dustin Hopkins kick), 1:41. Redskins 24–7. **Drive: 9 plays, 91 yards, 4:39.**
- CHI – Cameron Meredith 21-yard pass from Matt Barkley (Connor Barth kick), 0:34. Redskins 24–14. **Drive: 4 plays, 75 yards, 1:07.**

**Third quarter**

- WAS – Kirk Cousins 1-yard run (Dustin Hopkins kick), 3:05. Redskins 31–14. **Drive: 13 plays, 55 yards, 6:37.**

**Fourth quarter**

- WAS – Dustin Hopkins 20-yard field goal, 12:53. Redskins 34–14. **Drive: 4 plays, 8 yards, 1:43.**
- CHI – Deonte Thompson 3-yard pass from Matt Barkley (Connor Barth kick), 1:21. Redskins 34–21. **Drive: 11 plays, 85 yards, 5:05.**
- WAS – Mack Brown 61-yard run (Dustin Hopkins kick), 0:57. Redskins 41–21. **Drive: 3 plays, 67 yards, 0:24.**

**Top passers**

- WAS – Kirk Cousins – 19/28, 270 yards, TD
- CHI – Matt Barkley – 24/40, 323 yards, 2 TD, 5 INT

**Top rushers**

- WAS – Mack Brown – 8 rushes, 82 yards, TD
- CHI – Jordan Howard – 18 rushes, 119 yards

**Top receivers**

- WAS – DeSean Jackson – 5 receptions, 114 yards
- CHI – Cameron Meredith – 9 receptions, 135 yards, TD

==== Week 17: vs. New York Giants ====
Week Seventeen: New York Giants at Washington Redskins – Game summary

| Quarter | 1 | 2 | 3 | 4 | Total |
|---|---|---|---|---|---|
| **Giants** | 3 | 7 | 0 | 9 | **19** |
| Redskins | 0 | 0 | 3 | 7 | **10** |

at FedExField, Landover, Maryland

- Date: January 1, 2017
- Game time: 4:25 p.m. EST
- Game weather: 53 °F (12 °C), Sunny
- Game attendance: 79,471
- Referee: Gene Steratore
- TV announcers (Fox): Joe Buck, Troy Aikman and Erin Andrews
- Recap, Gamebook

Game information

**First quarter**

- NYG – Robbie Gould 22-yard field goal, 2:12. Giants 3–0. **Drive: 13 plays, 56 yards, 6:40.**

**Second quarter**

- NYG – Rashad Jennings 2-yard run (Robbie Gould kick), 9:29. Giants 10–0. **Drive: 11 plays, 74 yards, 5:40.**

**Third quarter**

- WAS – Dustin Hopkins 32-yard field goal, 0:25. Giants 10–3. **Drive: 5 plays, 33 yards, 2:11.**

**Fourth quarter**

- WAS – Jordan Reed 1-yard pass from Kirk Cousins (Dustin Hopkins kick), 8:13. Tied 10–10. **Drive: 11 plays, 76 yards, 5:14.**
- NYG – Robbie Gould 40-yard field goal, 2:12. Giants 13–10. **Drive: 8 plays, 58 yards, 3:49.**
- NYG – Trevin Wade 11-yard fumble return (run failed), 0:00. Giants 19–10.

**Top passers**

- NYG – Eli Manning – 17/27, 180 yards
- WAS – Kirk Cousins – 22/35, 287 yards, TD, 2 INT

**Top rushers**

- NYG – Paul Perkins – 21 rushes, 102 yards
- WAS – Robert Kelley – 12 rushes, 33 yards

**Top receivers**

- NYG – Will Tye – 4 receptions, 47 yards
- WAS – Pierre Garçon – 4 receptions, 96 yards

With their playoff hopes on the line, the Redskins hosted the 10–5 New York Giants. The Redskins were pressured all day and two picks by Dominique Rodgers-Cromartie made the Redskins miss out on the playoffs.

== Standings ==
=== Division ===
NFC East
| | W | L | T | PCT | DIV | CONF | PF | PA | STK |
|---|---|---|---|---|---|---|---|---|---|
| ^{(1)} Dallas Cowboys | 13 | 3 | 0 | .813 | 3–3 | 9–3 | 421 | 306 | L1 |
| ^{(5)} New York Giants | 11 | 5 | 0 | .688 | 4–2 | 8–4 | 310 | 284 | W1 |
| Washington Redskins | 8 | 7 | 1 | .531 | 3–3 | 6–6 | 396 | 383 | L1 |
| Philadelphia Eagles | 7 | 9 | 0 | .438 | 2–4 | 5–7 | 367 | 331 | W2 |

=== Conference ===
NFC
| # | Team | Division | W | L | T | PCT | DIV | CONF | SOS | SOV | STK |
|---|---|---|---|---|---|---|---|---|---|---|---|
Division leaders
| 1 | Dallas Cowboys | East | 13 | 3 | 0 | .813 | 3–3 | 9–3 | .471 | .440 | L1 |
| 2 | Atlanta Falcons | South | 11 | 5 | 0 | .688 | 5–1 | 9–3 | .480 | .452 | W4 |
| 3 | Seattle Seahawks | West | 10 | 5 | 1 | .656 | 3–2–1 | 6–5–1 | .441 | .425 | W1 |
| 4 | Green Bay Packers | North | 10 | 6 | 0 | .625 | 5–1 | 8–4 | .508 | .453 | W6 |
Wild Cards
| 5 | New York Giants | East | 11 | 5 | 0 | .688 | 4–2 | 8–4 | .486 | .455 | W1 |
| 6 (Note: Detroit finished ahead of Tampa Bay for the No. 6 seed and qualified for the last playoff spot based on record vs. common opponents—Detroit's cumulative record against Chicago, Dallas, Los Angeles and New Orleans was 3–2, while Tampa Bay's cumulative record against the same four teams was 2–3.) | Detroit Lions | North | 9 | 7 | 0 | .563 | 3–3 | 7–5 | .475 | .392 | L3 |
Did not qualify for the postseason
| 7 | Tampa Bay Buccaneers | South | 9 | 7 | 0 | .563 | 4–2 | 7–5 | .492 | .434 | W1 |
| 8 | Washington Redskins | East | 8 | 7 | 1 | .531 | 3–3 | 6–6 | .516 | .430 | L1 |
| 9 | Minnesota Vikings | North | 8 | 8 | 0 | .500 | 2–4 | 5–7 | .492 | .457 | W1 |
| 10 | Arizona Cardinals | West | 7 | 8 | 1 | .469 | 4–1–1 | 6–5–1 | .463 | .366 | W2 |
| 11 (Note: New Orleans finished ahead of Philadelphia based on better record vs. conference opponents.) | New Orleans Saints | South | 7 | 9 | 0 | .438 | 2–4 | 6–6 | .523 | .393 | L1 |
| 12 | Philadelphia Eagles | East | 7 | 9 | 0 | .438 | 2–4 | 5–7 | .559 | .518 | W2 |
| 13 | Carolina Panthers | South | 6 | 10 | 0 | .375 | 1–5 | 5–7 | .518 | .354 | L2 |
| 14 | Los Angeles Rams | West | 4 | 12 | 0 | .250 | 2–4 | 3–9 | .504 | .500 | L7 |
| 15 | Chicago Bears | North | 3 | 13 | 0 | .188 | 2–4 | 3–9 | .521 | .396 | L4 |
| 16 | San Francisco 49ers | West | 2 | 14 | 0 | .125 | 2–4 | 2–10 | .504 | .250 | L1 |
Tiebreakers (Note: When breaking ties for three or more teams under the NFL's rules, they are first broken within divisions, then comparing only the highest-ranked remaining team from each division.)
