= Clemson–Georgia football rivalry =

American college football rivalry

- Clemson Tigers Georgia Bulldogs
- First meeting: October 9, 1897; Georgia, 24–0
- Latest meeting: August 31, 2024; Georgia, 34–3

Statistics
- Total meetings: 66
- All-time series: Georgia leads, 44–18–4
- Largest victory: Georgia, 55–0 (1920)
- Longest win streak: Georgia, 10 (1920–1954)
- Current win streak: Georgia, 3 (2014–present)

Locations of Clemson and Georgia

The Clemson–Georgia football rivalry is an American college football rivalry between the Clemson Tigers and Georgia Bulldogs. It was for many years a spirited "border" rivalry between the two schools that are separated by a mere 70 miles. They met annually from 1897 to 1916, and again from 1962 to 1987 (aside from 1966 and 1972). The majority of meetings in over the first half century took place in Athens and Augusta, Georgia until 1967, not long after Clemson College expanded to University status, when the series shifted to become a more traditional, annual home-and-home series. Georgia leads the series 44–18–4, with 43 games played in Georgia, 22 games played in South Carolina, and one game played in North Carolina. Since 1987, the two schools have played intermittently.

== Series history ==
The two schools renewed their rivalry at Bank of America Stadium, as the 2021 season opener game. Georgia won the game 10–3, with neither team scoring an offensive touchdown. Georgia’s defense held Clemson to 2 yards rushing. The two teams also played the 2024 season opener in the Chick-fil-A Kickoff Game in Atlanta, with Georgia winning 34–3. The two programs had planned a home-and-away series in 2029–30 and 2032–33. On September 22, 2026, it was announced that the future home-and-away four-game series has been canceled.

== Notable games ==
=== 2002: Shockley rescues Bulldogs ===
In the first renewal of the rivalry since 1995, Georgia starting quarterback David Greene was ineffective for most of the game – just 12–27 for 67 yards – and Clemson had a 28–21 lead heading into the fourth quarter. At that point, Georgia coach Mark Richt inserted backup freshman QB DJ Shockley (who had rushed for a second quarter touchdown) into the game for the rest of the way to try to save the 8th ranked Bulldogs.

With 12:35 left, Shockley connected with Terrance Edwards for a 24-yard touchdown pass to tie it at 28. After Clemson went three and out, Damian Gary returned the punt 40 yards to set up a 43-yard field goal by Billy Bennett. He made it to put Georgia up 31–28. Clemson had one more chance to tie the game or win, and moved into field goal range. But Aaron Hunt's game-tying field goal attempt from 46 yards out fell short, and Georgia survived 31–28.

=== 2013: Boyd outduels Murray in shootout ===
On the opening weekend of the 2013 season, #8 Clemson hosted #5 Georgia. College GameDay traveled to Clemson for just the second time ever, and the game was sold out almost immediately.

The game instantly turned into a shootout. Georgia took a 21–14 second quarter lead on touchdowns by Todd Gurley, Quayvon Hicks and Keith Marshall, but from that point, Clemson quarterback Tajh Boyd took over. After rushing for a first quarter touchdown, Boyd did it again to tie the game at 21. Then he connected with Zac Brooks and Stanton Seckinger for touchdowns. Clemson held a 38–28 lead late in the fourth quarter, but Georgia QB Aaron Murray led the Bulldogs back, diving into the end zone to cut it to 38–35 with 1:19 left. Clemson recovered the onside kick to hold on for the victory.

=== 2021: A low-scoring slugfest ===
During the opening weekend of the 2021 season, #3 Clemson and #5 Georgia reunited in a highly-anticipated neutral site matchup in the Duke's Mayo Classic. Both starting quarterbacks, Georgia's JT Daniels and Clemson's DJ Uiagalelei, were considered pre-season Heisman hopefuls. However, it would be the defenses that ruled the day in a 10–3 defensive standoff. The Georgia defense made a strong first impression by holding Clemson to 2 rushing yards, sacking Uiagalelei seven times, and scoring the game's only touchdown on a 74-yard pick-six by defensive back Christopher Smith late in the first half. It was this performance that propelled the team to a 14–1 record and the program's first national championship in 41 years.

== Game results ==
Clemson victories	Georgia victories	Ties

No.	Date	Location	Winner	Score
1	October 9, 1897	Athens, GA	Georgia	24–0
2	October 8, 1898	Athens, GA	Georgia	20–8
3	October 7, 1899	Athens, GA	Georgia	11–0
4	November 10, 1900	Athens, GA	Clemson	39–5
5	October 26, 1901	Athens, GA	Clemson	29–5
6	November 8, 1902	Clemson, SC	Clemson	36–0
7	October 10, 1903	Athens, GA	Clemson	29–0
8	October 22, 1904	Clemson, SC	Clemson	10–0
9	October 21, 1905	Athens, GA	Clemson	35–0
10	October 20, 1906	Clemson, SC	Clemson	6–0
11	November 7, 1907	Augusta, GA	Georgia	8–0
12	November 5, 1908	Augusta, GA	Georgia	8–0
13	November 10, 1909	Augusta, GA	Clemson	5–0
14	November 10, 1910	Augusta, GA	Tie	0–0
15	November 9, 1911	Augusta, GA	Georgia	22–0
16	November 9, 1912	Augusta, GA	Georgia	27–6
17	November 6, 1913	Augusta, GA	Georgia	18–15
18	November 7, 1914	Athens, GA	Clemson	35–13
19	November 25, 1915	Athens, GA	Georgia	13–0
20	October 7, 1916	Anderson, SC	Georgia	26–0
21	November 7, 1919	Athens, GA	Tie	0–0
22	November 25, 1920	Athens, GA	Georgia	55–0
23	November 24, 1921	Athens, GA	Georgia	28–0
24	November 12, 1927	Athens, GA	Georgia	32–0
25	November 11, 1932	Clemson, SC	Georgia	32–18
26	October 9, 1937	Athens, GA	Georgia	14–0
27	November 24, 1944	Athens, GA	Georgia	21–7
28	September 29, 1945	Athens, GA	Georgia	20–0
29	September 27, 1946	Athens, GA	Georgia	35–12
30	October 31, 1947	Athens, GA	Georgia	21–6
31	September 25, 1954	Athens, GA	Georgia	14–7
32	October 1, 1955	Clemson, SC	Clemson	26–7
33	October 13, 1962	Clemson, SC	Georgia	24–16
34	October 12, 1963	Clemson, SC	Tie	7–7

No.	Date	Location	Winner	Score
35	October 10, 1964	Athens, GA	Georgia	19–7
36	October 9, 1965	Athens, GA	#4 Georgia	23–9
37	September 30, 1967	Clemson, SC	#5 Georgia	24–17
38	September 28, 1968	Athens, GA	Georgia	31–13
39	September 27, 1969	Clemson, SC	#7 Georgia	30–0
40	September 26, 1970	Athens, GA	Georgia	38–0
41	September 25, 1971	Clemson, SC	#14 Georgia	28–0
42	September 22, 1973	Athens, GA	Georgia	31–14
43	October 5, 1974	Clemson, SC	Clemson	28–24
44	October 4, 1975	Athens, GA	Georgia	35–7
45	September 18, 1976	Clemson, SC	#9 Georgia	41–0
46	September 17, 1977	Athens, GA	Clemson	7–6
47	September 23, 1978	Athens, GA	Georgia	12–0
48	September 22, 1979	Clemson, SC	Clemson	12–7
49	September 20, 1980	Athens, GA	#10 Georgia	20–16
50	September 19, 1981	Clemson, SC	Clemson	13–3
51	September 6, 1982	Athens, GA	#7 Georgia	13–7
52	September 17, 1983	Clemson, SC	Tie	16–16
53	September 22, 1984	Athens, GA	#20 Georgia	26–23
54	September 21, 1985	Clemson, SC	Georgia	20–13
55	September 20, 1986	Athens, GA	Clemson	31–28
56	September 19, 1987	Clemson, SC	#8 Clemson	21–20
57	October 6, 1990	Clemson, SC	#16 Clemson	34–3
58	October 5, 1991	Athens, GA	Georgia	27–12
59	October 8, 1994	Athens, GA	Georgia	40–14
60	October 7, 1995	Clemson, SC	Georgia	19–17
61	August 31, 2002	Athens, GA	#8 Georgia	31–28
62	August 30, 2003	Clemson, SC	#11 Georgia	30–0
63	August 31, 2013	Clemson, SC	#8 Clemson	38–35
64	August 30, 2014	Athens, GA	#12 Georgia	45–21
65	September 4, 2021	Charlotte, NC	#5 Georgia	10–3
66	August 31, 2024	Atlanta, GA	#1 Georgia	34–3
Series: Georgia leads 44–18–4

== See also ==
- List of NCAA college football rivalry games
