= Damik Scafe =

American football player (born 1988)

No. 75
- Position: Defensive end

Personal information
- Born: April 26, 1988 (age 38); Hartford, Connecticut, U.S.
- Listed height: 6 ft 2 in (1.88 m)
- Listed weight: 300 lb (136 kg)

Career information
- High school: Windsor
- College: Boston College
- NFL draft: 2011: undrafted

Career history
- San Diego Chargers (2011–2014)
- Stats at Pro Football Reference

Damik Alonzo Scafe (born April 26, 1988) is an American former football defensive end. He was originally signed by the San Diego Chargers as an undrafted free agent in 2011. He played college football at Boston College.

== Early life ==
Scafe earned Hartford Courant All-State honors as a senior defensive lineman at Windsor High School. He also gained All-State accolades from the Connecticut High School Coaches Association. Scafe was childhood friends with NFL nose tackle Terrance Knighton and Chris Baker since high school, where the three of them were teammates.

== College career ==
Scafe was a starter on the Eagles defensive line in his last two years with Boston College (2009, 2010).

== Professional career ==
He began his rookie season on the Reserve/Injured list and spent the final four weeks on the Chargers' practice squad.

He made his NFL debut on December 23, 2012 against the New York Jets and appeared in final two games as sub, registering one quarterback hit.

Scafe was waived/injured by the Chargers on August 18, 2014. He waived on May 5, 2015.
