= Ryan Delaire =

American football player (born 1992)

No. 91, 92
- Position: Defensive end

Personal information
- Born: January 17, 1992 (age 34); Bloomfield, Connecticut, US
- Listed height: 6 ft 4 in (1.93 m)
- Listed weight: 265 lb (120 kg)

Career information
- High school: Windsor (CT)
- College: UMass (2011–2012); Towson (2013–2014)
- NFL draft: 2015: undrafted

Career history
- Tampa Bay Buccaneers (2015)*; Washington Redskins (2015)*; Carolina Panthers (2015–2016); Indianapolis Colts (2018)*; San Francisco 49ers (2018)
- * Offseason or practice squad member only

Career NFL statistics
- Total tackles: 14
- Sacks: 3.5
- Forced fumbles: 0
- Fumble recoveries: 0
- Stats at Pro Football Reference

Ryan Delaire (born January 17, 1992) is an American former professional football player who was a defensive end in the National Football League (NFL). He played college football for the Towson Tigers. He signed with the Tampa Bay Buccaneers as an undrafted free agent in 2015.

== Early life ==
Delaire attended Windsor High School, where he was a standout athlete for several Warriors teams. He won a total of five letters in football and basketball. Off the field, Delaire was a successful multi-time scholar athlete who earned high honors accolades. After graduating from high school in 2010, Delaire chose to attend UMass to play football.

== College career ==
As a redshirt freshman in 2011, Delaire appeared in 10 out of possible 11 games during the 2011 season. In those 10 games, he amassed 9 tackles, including 2 for losses, and 0.5 sacks.

Delaire appeared in eight games for UMass during his sophomore season in 2012. He recorded 19 tackles, including 5 for losses, 2.5 sacks, and a forced fumble.

Prior to the 2013 season, Delaire transferred to Towson University to play for Rob Ambrose's Tigers. His move proved to be beneficial as he had his most successful season as a college athlete, both in terms of statistics and accolades. In 2013, Delaire was a crucial part of the national runner-up Towson team. He made 68 tackles and had 17.5 tackles for loss, 11.5 sacks, 3 pass break ups, 2 forced fumbles, and 4 fumble recoveries. Delaire's efforts earned him a spot on the All-CAA first team and also earned him College Sports Madness third team All-American and Beyond Sports Network third team All-American honors.

== Professional career ==
=== Tampa Bay Buccaneers ===
Delaire was signed as an undrafted rookie on May 5, 2015.

=== Washington Redskins ===
The Washington Redskins signed Delaire to their practice squad on September 7, 2015.

=== Carolina Panthers ===
On September 30, 2015, the Carolina Panthers signed Delaire off the Redskins' practice squad. In his first career game against the Tampa Bay Buccaneers, he recorded five tackles and two sacks of Jameis Winston. In the next game where he participated during the Panthers 27–23 victory at the Seattle Seahawks, Delaire recorded one tackle and five quarterback pressures against Russell Wilson. During the Panthers week 11 victory over the Washington Redskins to move them to 10–0 for the first time in franchise history, Delaire recorded a half sack on quarterback Kirk Cousins.

On February 7, 2016, Delaire's Panthers played in Super Bowl 50. He was inactive for the game, which saw the Panthers fall to the Denver Broncos by a score of 24–10.

On September 27, 2016, Delaire was placed on injured reserve with a knee injury. He was activated off injured reserve on November 25, 2016. He was placed back on injured reserve on December 27, 2016.

On July 25, 2017, Delaire was waived by the Panthers with a failed physical designation.

=== Indianapolis Colts ===
On August 11, 2018, Delaire signed with the Indianapolis Colts. He was waived on September 2, 2018.

=== San Francisco 49ers ===
On September 26, 2018, Delaire was signed to the San Francisco 49ers' practice squad. He was promoted to the active roster on October 6, 2018. He was waived on October 15, 2018, and was re-signed to the practice squad. On December 29, 2018, Delaire was promoted to the active roster. He was waived on May 6, 2019.
