= Chris Baker (defensive lineman) =

American football player (born 1987)

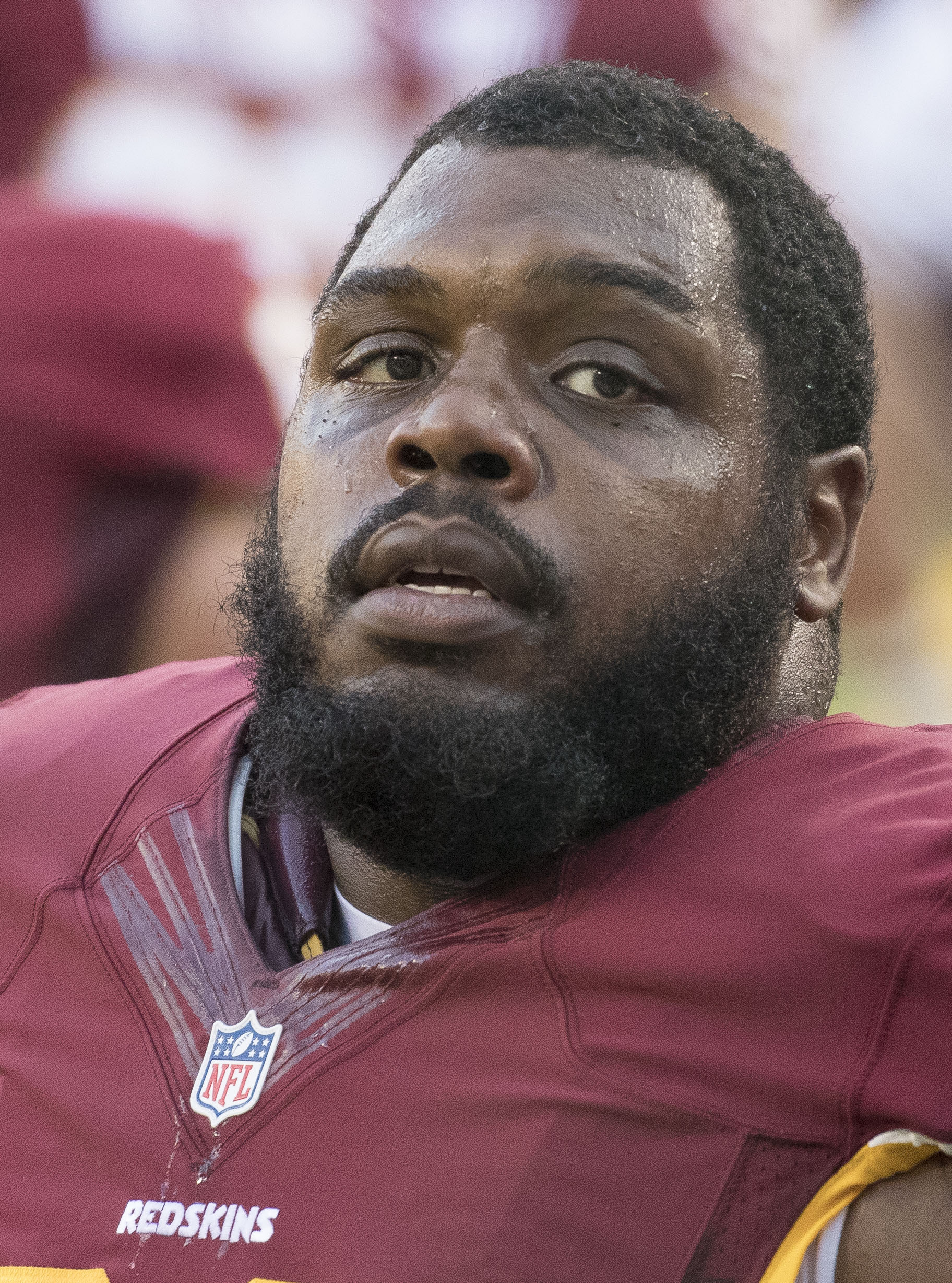
- Baker with the Washington Redskins in 2016

No. 75, 95, 92, 90
- Position: Defensive tackle

Personal information
- Born: October 8, 1987 (age 39); Windsor, Connecticut, U.S.
- Listed height: 6 ft 2 in (1.88 m)
- Listed weight: 320 lb (145 kg)

Career information
- High school: Windsor
- College: Penn State (2005–2007); Hampton (2008)
- NFL draft: 2009: undrafted

Career history
- Denver Broncos (2009); Miami Dolphins (2010); Washington Redskins (2011–2016); Tampa Bay Buccaneers (2017); Cincinnati Bengals (2018)*
- * Offseason or practice squad member only

Awards and highlights
- First-team All-MEAC (2008)

Career NFL statistics
- Total tackles: 214
- Sacks: 12.0
- Forced fumbles: 5
- Fumble recoveries: 2
- Pass deflections: 7
- Stats at Pro Football Reference

Christopher Isaiah Baker (born October 8, 1987), nicknamed "Swaggy", is an American former professional football player who was a defensive tackle for nine seasons in National Football League (NFL). He played college football for the Penn State Nittany Lions and Hampton Pirates before signing with the Denver Broncos as an undrafted free agent in 2009. Baker was also a member of the Miami Dolphins, Hartford Colonials, Washington Redskins, Tampa Bay Buccaneers, and Cincinnati Bengals.

== College career ==
Baker originally played football collegiately at Pennsylvania State University. Before the 2007 season, he was involved in two separate off-campus fights along with nine of his Nittany Lions teammates. On June 26, 2007, Penn State temporarily expelled all ten involved players from July 1 through the end of the summer semester in mid-August. His expulsion was later made permanent. Baker transferred to Hampton University to continue playing football in 2008.

== Professional career ==
=== Denver Broncos ===
Baker signed with the Denver Broncos on April 27, 2009. He played one game for the Broncos for the 2009 season. On September 3, 2010, the Broncos released Baker.

=== Miami Dolphins ===
On October 7, 2010, Baker was signed to the practice squad of the Miami Dolphins. He was promoted to the active 53-man roster on November 26, 2010. He played one game for the Dolphins in the 2010 season. The Dolphins released him on July 31, 2011.

=== Washington Redskins ===
On September 5, 2011, the Washington Redskins signed Baker to its practice squad. On December 6, 2011, Baker was promoted from the practice squad to the active 53-man roster. Without even playing a game for the Redskins, he was placed on injured reserve due to a quad injury on December 13, 2011.

By the start of 2012 training camp, Baker was fully healed and was expected to compete with Chris Neild for the backup nose tackle position. After Neild was placed on injured reserve in the preseason, Baker made the final 53-man roster in his place.

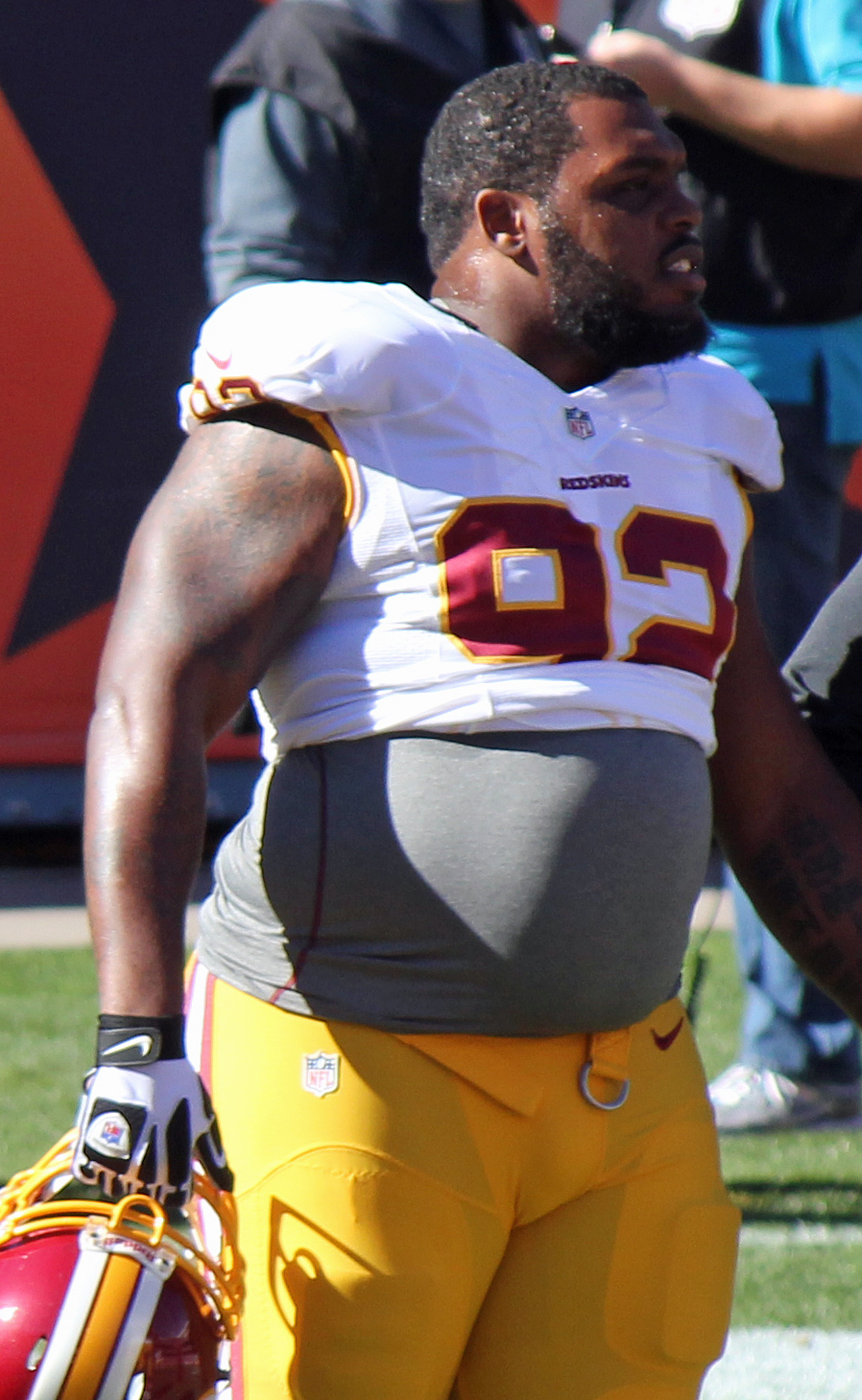
Baker with the Redskins in 2013

Originally set to become a restricted free agent, the Redskins tendered a restricted free-agent right-of-first-refusal qualifying offer to Baker on March 11, 2013. Baker officially accepted and signed the team's tender on April 10. He recorded his first career sack on Jay Cutler in the Week 7 win against the Chicago Bears.

Set to become a restricted free agent again for the 2014 season, the Redskins announced they had re-signed Baker to a three-year deal worth $12 million, with $4 million guaranteed. He would switch from the starting left defensive end position to the nose tackle position after starter Barry Cofield was placed on short-term injured reserve. During a game against the Philadelphia Eagles on September 21, 2014, Baker hit Eagles quarterback Nick Foles following an interception (which eventually was reversed) by Foles. Foles was jogging towards the player who had intercepted his pass when Baker made a hard block on Foles. Following the hit, a brawl broke out on the sidelines between both teams. Baker was confronted by Eagles offensive tackle Jason Peters with Baker clamping the face mask of Peters in retaliation and with Peters taking a swing at Baker which resulted in both players getting ejected in the scuffle. After the game, Baker responded to the incident saying, "I didn't even really hit him hard. I just hit him with my shoulder and he happened to fall. He's the quarterback and I guess that's why there was an ejection." Despite conflicting opinions on whether on the block was legal or not, he was fined $8,268 for the fight with Peters. On October 17, 2014, Baker was fined $10,000 for dragging down Cardinals quarterback Carson Palmer by the face mask during the Week 6 loss.

Baker's gameplay in the 2015 season surprisingly progressed so much that he beat out new free agent acquisition, Stephen Paea, for the starting left defensive end position. In the Week 4 win against the Eagles, he recorded two sacks on quarterback Sam Bradford, which was his first multi-sack game. At the end of the regular season, he recorded a new career-high of six sacks, which earned him the $280,000 bonus in his contract.

=== Tampa Bay Buccaneers ===
On March 9, 2017, Baker signed a three-year contract with the Tampa Bay Buccaneers. His contract was worth $15.75 million with $9 million guaranteed. In his lone season with the Buccaneers, Baker recorded 33 tackles and 0.5 sacks. On February 20, 2018, he was released by the Buccaneers after one season.

=== Cincinnati Bengals ===
On March 7, 2018, Baker signed a one-year contract with the Cincinnati Bengals. He was released on August 24, 2018.

== NFL career statistics ==
Legend
**Bold**	Career high

=== Regular season ===
Year	Team	Games		Tackles					Interceptions					Fumbles			
Year	Team	GP	GS	Cmb	Solo	Ast	Sck	TFL	Int	Yds	TD	Lng	PD	FF	FR	Yds	TD
2009	DEN	1	0	0	0	0	0.0	0	0	0	0	0	0	0	0	0	0
2010	MIA	1	0	0	0	0	0.0	0	0	0	0	0	0	0	0	0	0
2012	WAS	14	0	15	8	7	0.0	0	0	0	0	0	1	0	0	0	0
2013	WAS	15	3	27	16	11	1.0	5	0	0	0	0	1	0	0	0	0
2014	WAS	15	12	39	24	15	1.0	4	0	0	0	0	0	0	0	0	0
2015	WAS	**16**	10	**53**	26	**27**	**6.0**	**10**	0	0	0	0	1	**3**	**2**	0	0
2016	WAS	**16**	**16**	47	**29**	18	3.5	7	0	0	0	0	**2**	2	0	0	0
2017	TAM	15	14	33	24	9	0.5	2	0	0	0	0	**2**	0	0	0	0
Career		93	55	214	127	87	12.0	28	0	0	0	0	7	5	2	0	0

=== Playoffs ===
Year	Team	Games		Tackles					Interceptions					Fumbles			
Year	Team	GP	GS	Cmb	Solo	Ast	Sck	TFL	Int	Yds	TD	Lng	PD	FF	FR	Yds	TD
2012	WAS	**1**	0	1	0	**1**	0.0	0	0	0	0	0	0	0	0	0	0
2015	WAS	**1**	**1**	**2**	**2**	0	0.0	0	0	0	0	0	0	0	0	0	0
Career		2	1	3	2	1	0.0	0	0	0	0	0	0	0	0	0	0

== Personal life ==
Baker has been childhood friends with nose tackle Terrance Knighton and Damik Scafe since high school, where the three of them were teammates. Knighton was Baker's best man in his wedding to ESPN talent producer, Jamila Phillips, on March 14, 2015.

On January 7, 2016, Baker's first child, Aria, was born.

He suffered a stroke in January 2023, but survived.

=== Legal issues ===
While attending Penn State, Baker was sentenced to two years of probation after pleading guilty two cases of assault on May 16, 2008.
