= Matt Jones (running back) =

American football player (born 1993)

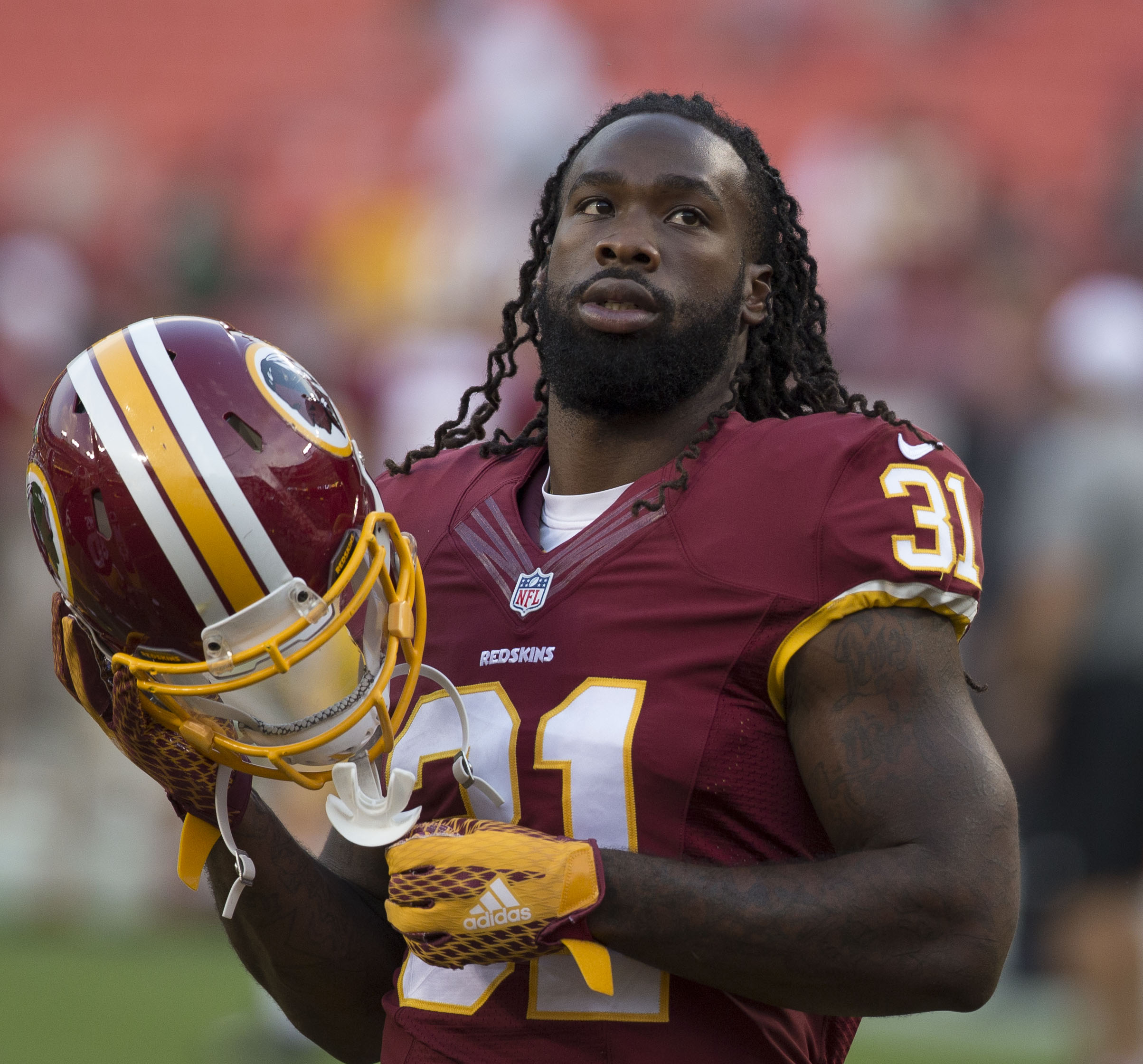
- Jones with the Washington Redskins in 2015

No. 31, 34, 24
- Position: Running back

Personal information
- Born: March 7, 1993 (age 33); Tampa, Florida, U.S.
- Listed height: 6 ft 2 in (1.88 m)
- Listed weight: 239 lb (108 kg)

Career information
- High school: Armwood (Seffner, Florida)
- College: Florida (2012–2014)
- NFL draft: 2015: 3rd round, 95th overall pick

Career history
- Washington Redskins (2015–2016); Indianapolis Colts (2017); Philadelphia Eagles (2018)*; St. Louis BattleHawks (2020); Vegas Vipers (2023)*
- * Offseason or practice squad member only

Awards and highlights
- Mid Season All-XFL (2020)

Career NFL statistics
- Rushing yards: 964
- Rushing average: 3.9
- Rushing touchdowns: 6
- Receptions: 27
- Receiving yards: 377
- Receiving touchdowns: 1
- Stats at Pro Football Reference

Matt Jones (born March 7, 1993) is an American former professional football player who was a running back in the National Football League (NFL). He played college football for the Florida Gators, and was selected by the Washington Redskins in the third round of the 2015 NFL draft. He was also a member of the Indianapolis Colts, Philadelphia Eagles, St. Louis Battlehawks and Vegas Vipers.

== Early life ==
Jones attended Armwood High School in Seffner, Florida, where he played high school football. He helped lead Armwood to a 15-0 record and the FHSAA Class 6A Championship and #2 national ranking his senior year while rushing for 896 yards and 10 touchdowns despite missing four games and also hauling in nine catches for 197 yards and three more scores. He earned an Honorable Mention All-State honors. He also competed in track and field at Armwood.

Jones was rated as a four-star recruit by Rivals.com and was ranked as the 15th-best running back in his class. He committed to Florida to play college football over offers from Auburn, Notre Dame, and South Carolina, among many others.

== College career ==
Jones appeared in 12 games as a true freshman in 2012. He rushed for 275 yards on 52 carries with three touchdowns. As a sophomore in 2013, Jones played in only five games due to a torn meniscus. He finished the year with 339 yards on 79 carries with two touchdowns. He returned from the injury for his junior season in 2014. In 2014, he had 166 carries for 817 rushing yards and six rushing touchdowns.

Jones entered the 2015 NFL draft, after his junior season.

== Professional career ==
Pre-draft measurables
Height	Weight	Arm length	Hand span	40-yard dash	10-yard split	20-yard split	20-yard shuttle	Three-cone drill	Vertical jump	Broad jump	Bench press
6 ft 2 3/8 in (1.89 m)	231 lb (105 kg)	32 in (0.81 m)	8 5/8 in (0.22 m)	4.61 s	1.55 s	2.65 s	4.20 s	6.84 s	31 1/2 in (0.80 m)	9 ft 4 in (2.84 m)	20 reps
All values from NFL Combine and Pro Day

=== Washington Redskins ===
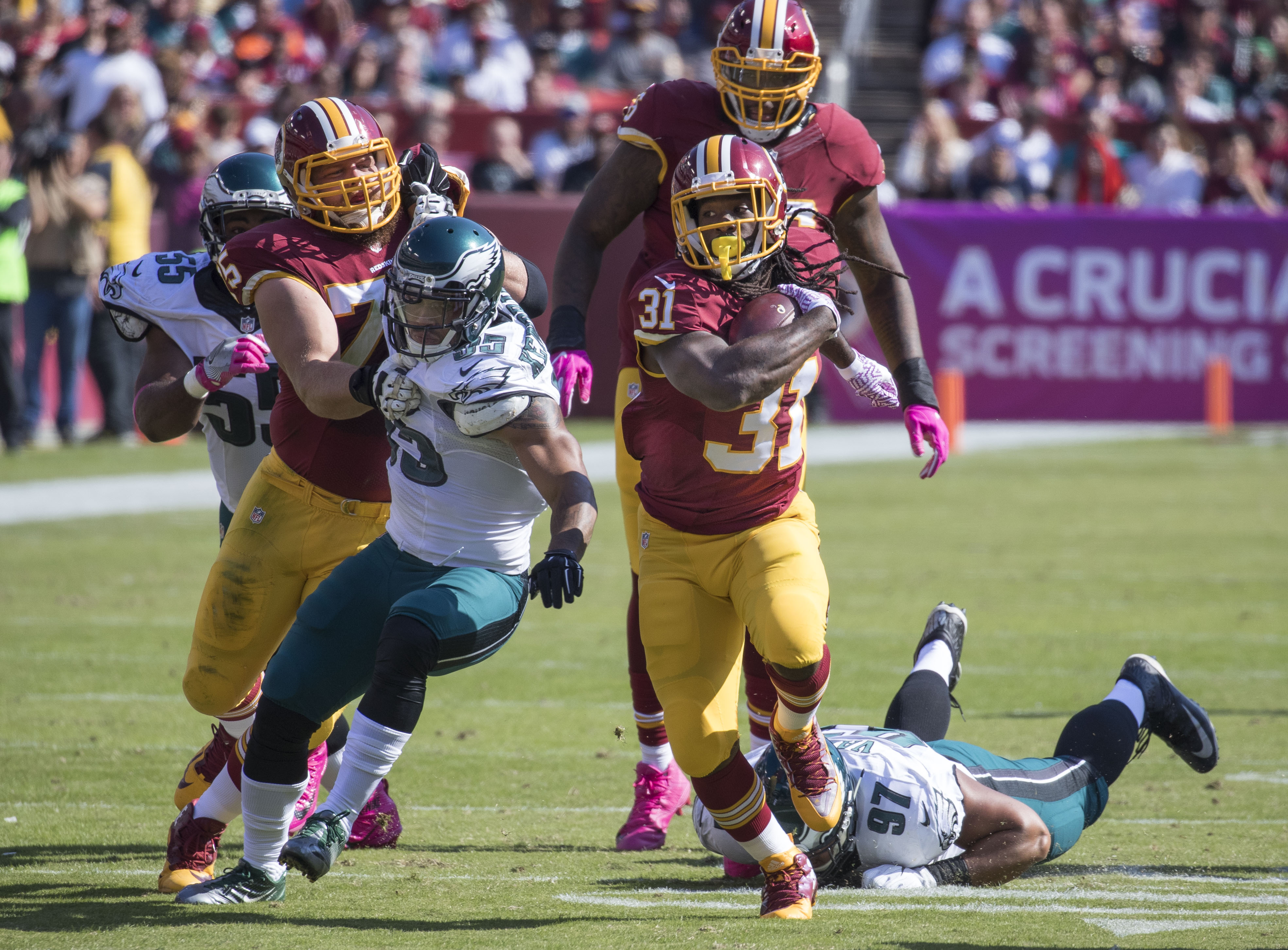
Jones playing against the Philadelphia Eagles in 2016.

The Washington Redskins selected Jones with the 95th overall pick of the 2015 NFL draft. He signed a four-year contract on May 11, 2015. On September 20, against the St. Louis Rams, Jones ran 39 yards for a touchdown, which was his longest run from scrimmage. Jones would run for a career-high 123 yards and a career-high two touchdowns. On November 15, against the New Orleans Saints, Jones caught a pass and ran 78 yards for a touchdown, which was his first career receiving touchdown. He would finish with a career-high 131 receiving yards. On November 29, against the New York Giants, Jones caught a pass and ran for 45 yards. He finished his rookie season with 144 carries for 490 rushing yards and three rushing touchdowns.

Jones began the season cemented as the starting running back after Alfred Morris left via free agency in the 2016 offseason. Jones suffered a knee injury on October 23, 2016, during a 20–17 loss to the Detroit Lions. He was replaced by rookie Robert Kelley for the following game and officially lost his starting position after Kelley performed well in Jones' absence. The following week, he was relegated to the third-string behind Kelley and Chris Thompson. He finished the 2016 season with 99 carries for 460 rushing yards and three rushing touchdowns.

On September 2, 2017, Jones was waived by the Redskins.

=== Indianapolis Colts ===
Jones was claimed off waivers by the Indianapolis Colts on September 3, 2017. He was waived on September 9, and was re-signed to the team's practice squad. Jones was promoted to the active roster on September 22. He was waived by the Colts on December 2, but re-signed two days later. Jones finished the 2017 season with five carries for 14 yards in five games. He was waived by the Colts on May 1, 2018.

=== Philadelphia Eagles ===
On May 9, 2018, Jones signed a two-year contract with the Philadelphia Eagles. He was released by the Eagles on September 1.

=== St. Louis BattleHawks ===
In October 2019, Jones was selected by the St. Louis BattleHawks in the 2020 XFL draft. He was named to the mid-season All-XFL team after rushing for 314 yards and a touchdown on 80 rushes, and having 25 receiving yards and a touchdown. He had his contract terminated when the league suspended operations on April 10, 2020.

=== The Spring League ===
Jones played with the Sea Lions of The Spring League in 2021.

=== Vegas Vipers ===
Jones was selected by the Vegas Vipers of the XFL in the fifth round of the 2023 XFL Skill Players Draft. He was released on January 21, 2023.
