= Windsor High School (Connecticut) =

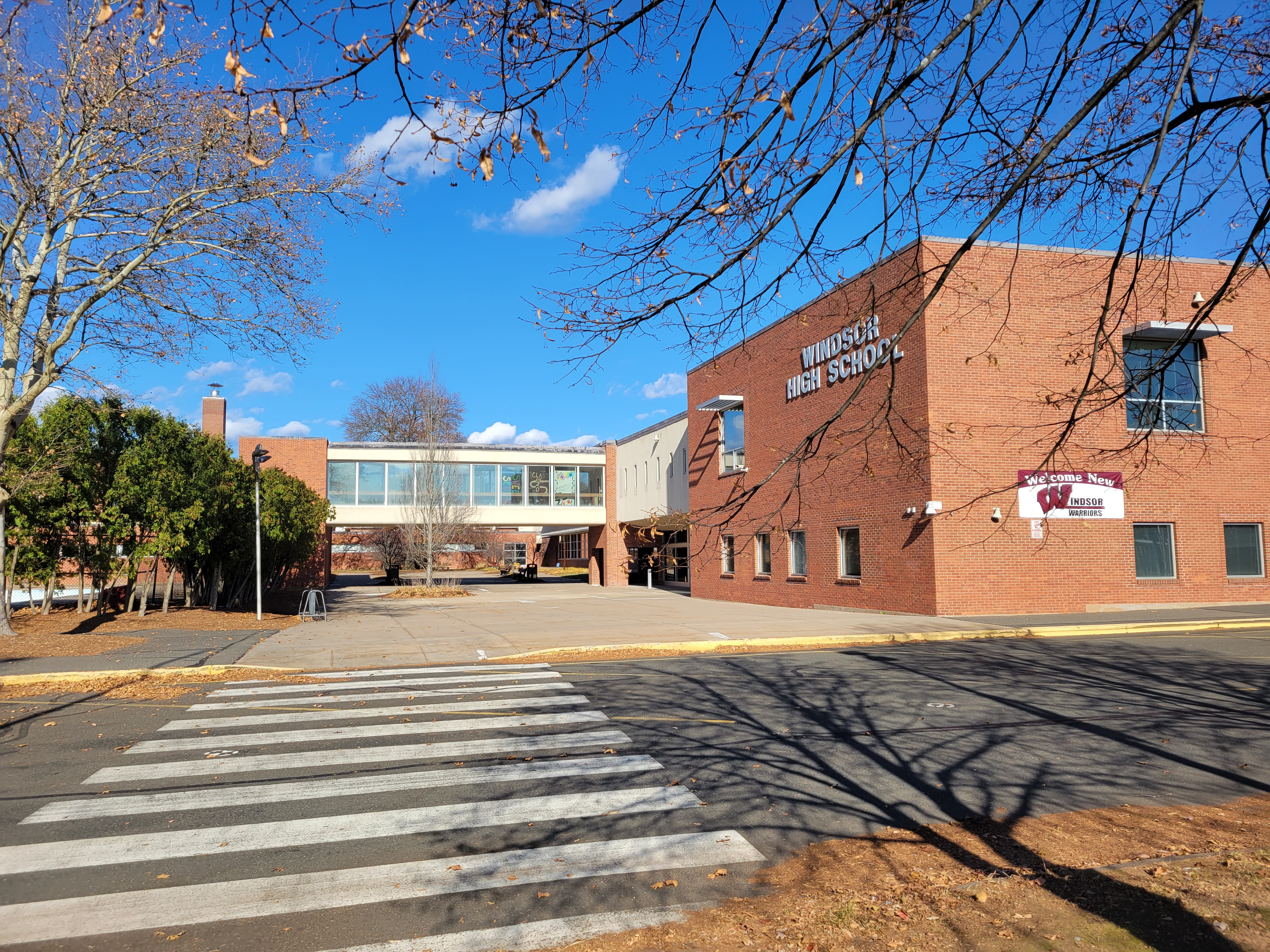

Location
- 50 Sage Park Road; Windsor, Connecticut 06095; United States
- 41°50′39″N 72°39′18″W

Information
- Type: Public school
- School district: Windsor School District
- Superintendent: Terrell Hill
- CEEB code: 070950
- Principal: Breon Parker
- Faculty: 108.80 (FTE)
- Grades: 9–12
- Enrollment: 1,119 (2023–2024)
- Student to teacher ratio: 10.28
- Colors: Maroon and white
- Team name: Warriors
- Website: www.windsorct.org/o/whs

Windsor High School is a public high school located in Windsor, Connecticut. This school serves students from the Town of Windsor, which is part of Hartford County.

== Athletics ==
=== Fall ===
- Cross country
- Field hockey
- Football
- Soccer — boys and girls
- Swimming — girls
- Volleyball — girls
- Cheerleading - boys and girls

=== Winter ===
- Basketball — boys and girls
- Ice hockey — boys (Farmington Valley Generals)
- Indoor track — boys and girls
- Wrestling — boys
- Cheerleading - boys and girls

=== Spring ===
- Baseball
- Golf
- Lacrosse — boys and girls
- Outdoor track — boys and girls
- Softball
- Tennis — girls
- Volleyball — boys

=== CIAC State Championships ===
Team	Year
Girls outdoor track	2010, 2011, 2012, 2013, 2014, 2015, 2016, 2018, 2019, 2021, 2022, 2023, 2024, 2025
Girls indoor track	2011, 2012, 2016, 2017, 2018, 2019, 2020, 2022, 2023, 2024, 2025, 2026
Boys outdoor track	2011, 2012, 2013, 2014, 2015, 2016, 2022, 2023
Boys basketball	1998, 1999, 2001, 2007, 2009, 2014, 2024, 2026
Baseball	1979, 1991, 2022
Boys indoor track	2012, 2015
Football	2014, 2025
Field hockey	1978
Girls soccer	1991
Boys ice hockey (Farmington Valley Generals)	2018
Golf	1964

== Notable alumni ==
- Dick Teed (1947), former MLB player who played for 17 years and played in one career game
- Chris Baker (2005), former NFL defensive tackle
- Terrance Knighton (2005-transferred), former NFL defensive tackle and current college coach
- Damik Scafe (2006), former NFL defensive end
- Ryan Delaire (2010), former NFL defensive end who played for the Carolina Panthers and San Francisco 49ers
- Tyler Coyle (2016), safety who played for the Dallas Cowboys
- Jason Pinnock (2017), safety for the New York Giants
- Ariel Bellvalaire, singer, songwriter, and guitarist for Debbie Gibson and Drag: The Musical.
