= Steven Daniels =

American football player (born 1992)

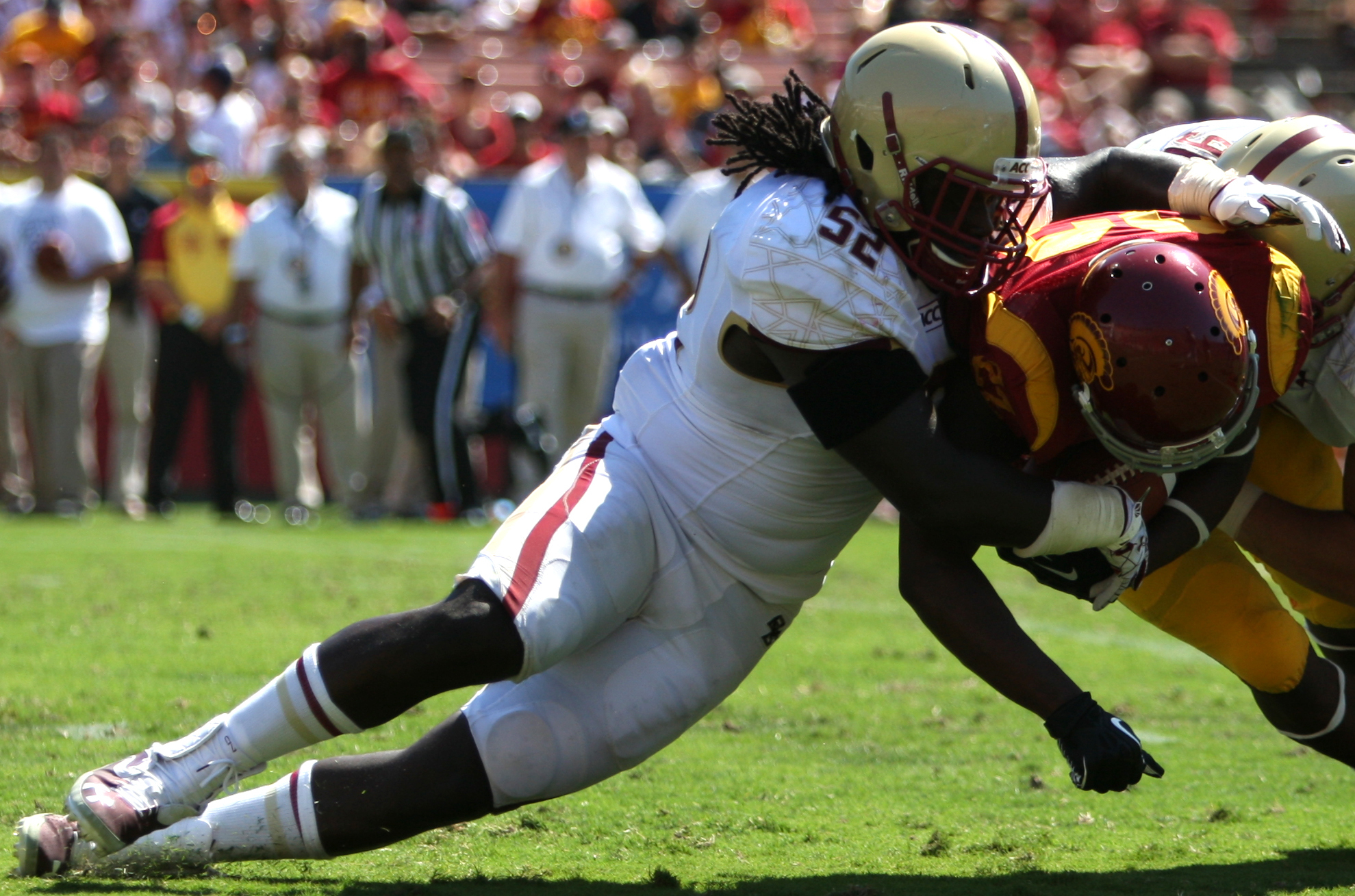
- Daniels with the Boston College Eagles in 2013

UMass Minutemen
- Title: Defensive line coach

Personal information
- Born: December 12, 1992 (age 33); Cincinnati, Ohio, U.S.
- Listed height: 5 ft 11 in (1.80 m)
- Listed weight: 245 lb (111 kg)

Career information
- High school: Worcester Academy (Worcester, Massachusetts)
- College: Boston College
- NFL draft: 2016: 7th round, 232nd overall pick

Career history

Playing
- Washington Redskins (2016); Philadelphia Eagles (2017)*; New York Giants (2017)*
- * Offseason or practice squad member only

Coaching
- Northeastern (2018) Assistant strength coach; Bryant (2019–2021) Inside linebackers coach; Boston College (2022) Assistant director of defensive recruiting; UMass (2023) Defensive analyst; UMass (2024–present) Defensive line coach

Awards and highlights
- Second-team All-ACC (2015)
- Stats at Pro Football Reference

Steven Wayne Daniels (born December 12, 1992) is an American college football coach and former professional linebacker. He is the defensive line coach for the University of Massachusetts Amherst, a position he has held since 2024. He played college football at Boston College, and was selected by the Washington Redskins in the seventh round of the 2016 NFL draft.

Daniels graduated from St. Xavier High School in Cincinnati in 2011, then completed a postgraduate year at Worcester Academy before attending Boston College. As a senior at Boston College, he earned first-team All-Atlantic Coast Conference (ACC) honors from ACC coaches.

== Professional career ==
=== Washington Redskins ===
Daniels was selected by the Washington Redskins in the seventh round (232nd overall) of the 2016 NFL draft. Daniels suffered a torn labrum during the team's training camp in August 2016, requiring surgery and prematurely ending his rookie season. On May 2, 2017, Daniels was waived by the team.

=== Philadelphia Eagles ===
On May 3, 2017, Daniels was claimed off waivers by the Philadelphia Eagles. He was waived by the Eagles on June 1, 2017, but re-signed with them on a three-year contract on July 26. He was waived again on August 12, 2017.

=== New York Giants ===
On August 15, 2017, Daniels was signed by the New York Giants. He was waived on September 1, 2017.

== Coaching career ==
Daniels began his coaching career as an intern at Boston College. He then joined Northeastern as an assistant strength coach in 2018. Afterwards, he served as inside linebackers coach at Bryant from 2019 to 2021. He joined Boston College in 2022 as the assistant director of defensive recruiting, and UMass as an analyst in 2023. He was promoted to defensive line coach following the departure of Steve Tirrell.
