= Robert Kelley (American football) =

American football player (born 1992)

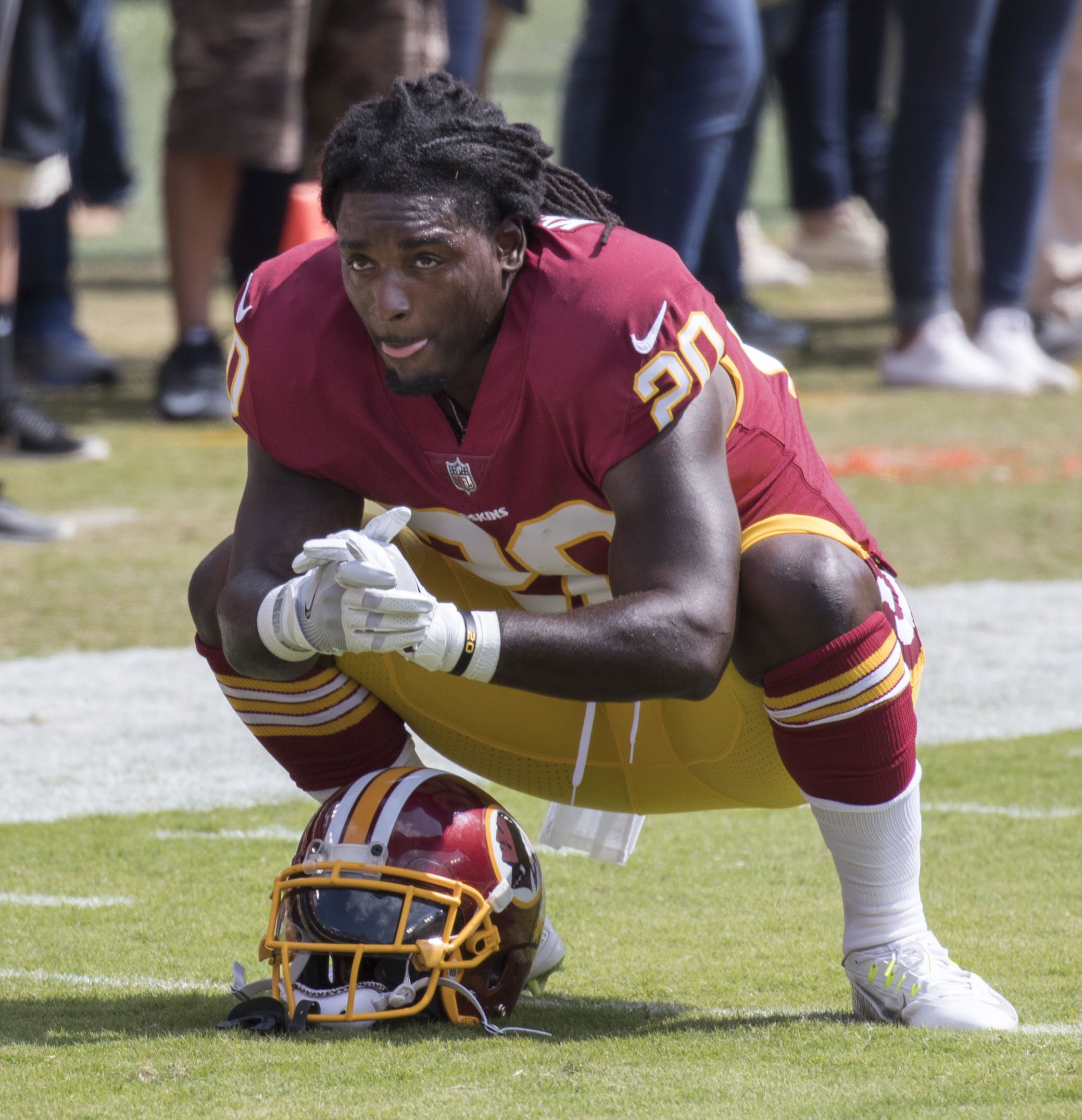
- Kelley with the Washington Redskins in 2017

No. 32, 20
- Position: Running back

Personal information
- Born: October 3, 1992 (age 34); New Orleans, Louisiana, U.S.
- Listed height: 6 ft 0 in (1.83 m)
- Listed weight: 229 lb (104 kg)

Career information
- High school: O. Perry Walker (New Orleans)
- College: Tulane (2011–2015)
- NFL draft: 2016: undrafted

Career history
- Washington Redskins (2016–2018); New Orleans Saints (2019)*
- * Offseason or practice squad member only

Career NFL statistics
- Rushing yards: 906
- Rushing average: 3.9
- Rushing touchdowns: 9
- Receptions: 16
- Receiving yards: 100
- Receiving touchdowns: 1
- Stats at Pro Football Reference

Robert Kelley (born October 3, 1992), nicknamed "Fat Rob", is an American former professional football player who was a running back in the National Football League (NFL). He played college football for the Tulane Green Wave and was signed by the Washington Redskins as an undrafted free agent in 2016.

== Early life ==
Kelley attended and played football at O. Perry Walker High School.

== College career ==
Kelley attended and played college football at Tulane from 2011 to 2015. He played under head coaches Bob Toledo, Mark Hutson, and Curtis Johnson.

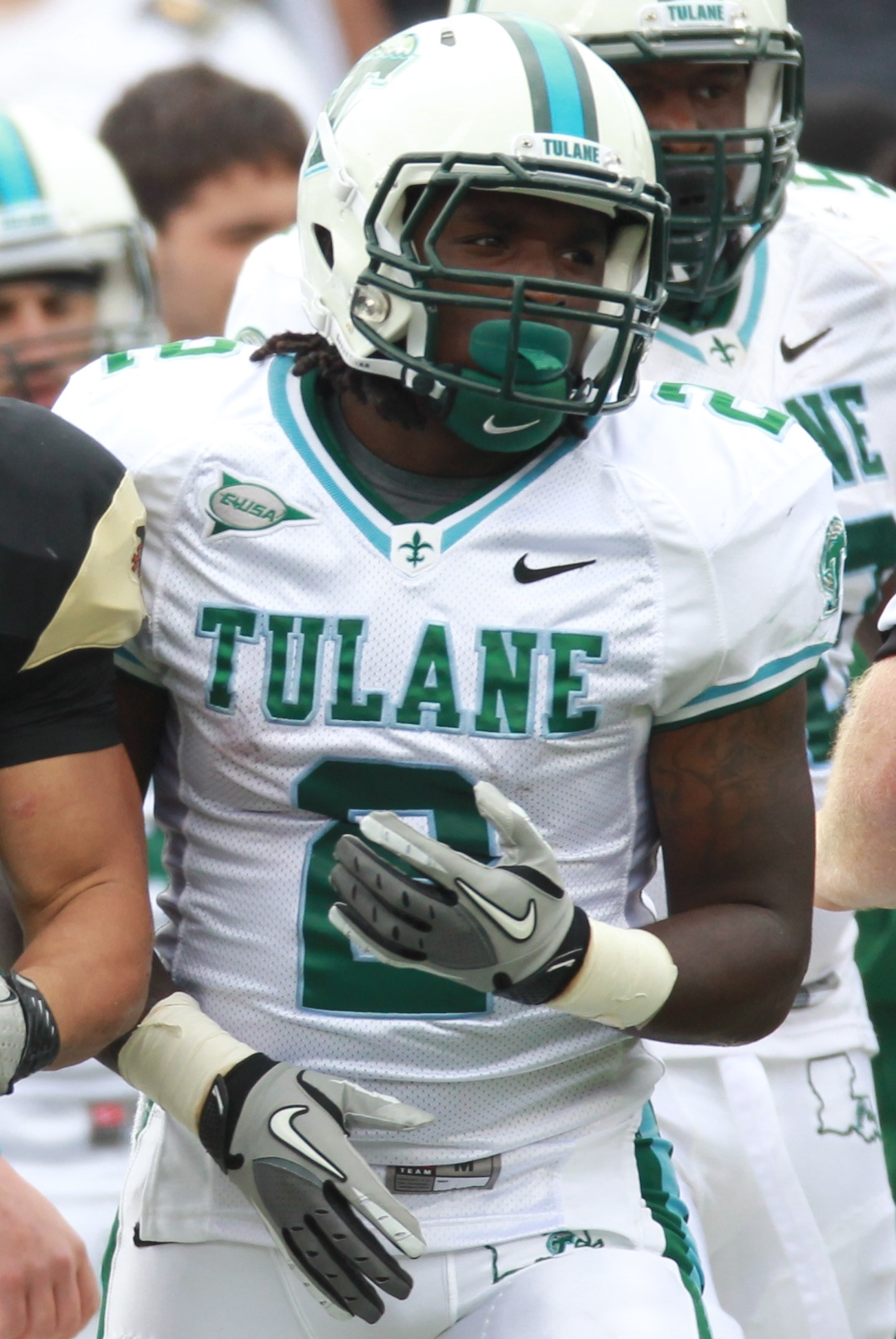
Kelley with Tulane in 2011

In the 2011 season, Kelley was part of a backfield dominated by Orleans Darkwa. Overall, he had 332 rushing yards, two rushing touchdowns, and 16 receptions for 178 yards. In the 2012 season, he had a team-high 286 rushing yards and 46 receptions for 340 yards and four receiving touchdowns. In the 2013 season, he had 420 rushing yards, three rushing touchdowns, 18 receptions, 176 receiving yards, and a receiving touchdown. In his final collegiate season in 2015, he shared the backfield with Dontrell Hilliard, Sherman Badie, Lazedrick Thompson, and Josh Rounds. Overall, he had 232 rushing yards, one rushing touchdown, six receptions, 33 receiving yards, and one receiving touchdown.

=== Statistics ===
Season	Team	Class	Pos	GP	Rushing				Receiving			
Season	Team	Class	Pos	GP	Rush	Yds	Avg	TD	Rec	Yds	Avg	TD
2011	Tulane	FR	RB	13	74	332	4.5	2	16	178	11.1	0
2012	Tulane	SO	RB	12	81	286	3.5	0	46	340	7.4	4
2013	Tulane	JR	RB	12	98	420	4.3	3	18	176	9.8	1
2015	Tulane	SR	RB	12	65	232	3.6	1	6	33	5.5	1
Career				49	318	1,270	4.0	6	86	727	8.5	6

== Professional career ==
=== Washington Redskins ===
On May 6, 2016, the Washington Redskins signed Kelley as an undrafted free agent after the 2016 NFL draft. On September 25, 2016, Kelley had his first rushing attempt of his career against the New York Giants. On October 23, 2016, he scored his first career touchdown against the Detroit Lions, a one-yard reception from quarterback Kirk Cousins. On October 30, 2016, Kelley made his first career start in place of an injured Matt Jones, where he rushed for 87 yards on 21 carries, while also scoring his first career rushing touchdown in a 27–27 tie with the Cincinnati Bengals. After his starting debut, the team announced that Kelley would be the full-time starting running back. On November 20, 2016, Kelley had his first multi-touchdown game after recording a career-high 137 rushing yards with three rushing touchdowns in a 42–24 victory over the Green Bay Packers on NBC Sunday Night Football. Overall, he finished his rookie season with 704 rushing yards, six rushing touchdowns, 12 receptions, 82 receiving yards, and a receiving touchdown.

In the 2017 season, Kelley's role diminished with the usage of Chris Thompson and Samaje Perine increasing. He scored two touchdowns against the Seattle Seahawks in the Week 9 win. He was placed on injured reserve on November 14, 2017, after re-aggravating a high ankle sprain and suffering an MCL sprain in Week 10. Overall, he finished the 2017 season with 62 carries for 194 rushing yards and three rushing touchdowns.

Kelley was placed on injured reserve on September 18, 2018, with a toe injury. He played two games in the 2018 season with only four carries for eight rushing yards.

=== New Orleans Saints ===
On July 30, 2019, Kelley signed with the New Orleans Saints, but was waived four days later.

== Personal life ==
Kelley was born and raised in the 9th Ward district of New Orleans, until he and his parents lost their home as a result of Hurricane Katrina's effect on the city in August 2005.

Kelley was arrested in July 2014 after a fellow student at Tulane claimed Kelley assaulted him and stole his bicycle. Due to the arrest, Kelley was suspended from the football team and subsequently missed the entirety of the 2014 season due to him being academically ineligible. The charges for the arrest were later dropped, and Kelley returned to the team for the 2015 season.

Kelley's "Fat Rob" nickname originated during his senior year at Tulane, after his running backs coach bought him a backpack with the nickname engraved on it.
