= Keith Marshall (American football) =

American football player (born 1994)

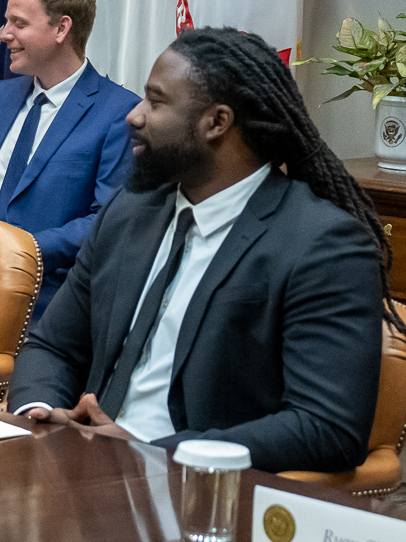
- Marshall at the White House in 2023

No. 39
- Position: Running back

Personal information
- Born: February 16, 1994 (age 32); Raleigh, North Carolina, U.S.
- Listed height: 5 ft 11 in (1.80 m)
- Listed weight: 222 lb (101 kg)

Career information
- High school: Millbrook (Raleigh)
- College: Georgia (2012–2015)
- NFL draft: 2016: 7th round, 242nd overall pick

Career history
- Washington Redskins (2016–2017)
- Stats at Pro Football Reference

Warren Keith Marshall Jr. (born February 16, 1994) is an American former professional football running back. He played college football for the Georgia Bulldogs, and was selected by the Washington Redskins in the seventh round of the 2016 NFL draft.

== Early life ==
Marshall attended Millbrook High School in Raleigh, North Carolina, where he played football and competed in track.

Marshall was 5-foot-11 and 190 pounds as a senior high school running back. Scout.com rated him a five-star prospect and the top-ranked running back in the class of 2012. Marshall was recruited by Georgia running backs coach Bryan McClendon who first observed Marshall as a sophomore halfback. Marshall committed to Georgia on December 6, 2011, and attempted to sway high school track friend Todd Gurley to commit to Georgia instead of Clemson University. Gurley committed to Georgia five weeks later. The pair wanted a combined talent similar to the rushing tandem of Alabama's Trent Richardson and Mark Ingram II.

Marshall was the North Carolina Gatorade Player of the Year as a high school senior, rushing for nearly 1,900 yards, and recruiters appreciated that he was the state Class 4A 100-meter dash champion.

Marshall's high school coach Clarence Inscore praised the synergy saying, "The idea of two highly recruited athletes ... playing the same position, a lot of people would say, man, that's kind of crazy, you're going to give up a lot of your carries. They were so mature in having that forethought to think, ... it's going to take two guys to get it done in the SEC."

In addition to football, Marshall competed on the school's track team as a sprinter, and participated in the 2011 USA Youth Outdoor Track & Field Championships in Myrtle Beach, South Carolina, as well as the 2011 NCHSAA Outdoor Track & Field Championship in the 100 meters. He was named the 2011 Gatorade Track & Field Athlete of the Year for the State of North Carolina. He won the 100-meter dash at the 2011 USATF Region 16 Championships, with a time of 10.44 seconds. He also placed first in the 200-meter dash at the 2011 CAP8 Conference Meet, at 21.54 seconds. At the NCHSAA 4A Mid-East Championships, he earned first-place finishes in both the 100 meters (10.52s) and 200 meters (21.30s).

Event	Time (seconds)	Venue	Date
100 meters	10.44	Raleigh, North Carolina	April 27, 2011
200 meters	21.30	Raleigh, North Carolina	April 27, 2011

== College career ==
Marshall and Gurley, endearingly nicknamed "Gurshall" by fans, rushed a combined 964 yards in their first five games during the 2012 season, Marshall averaging 86 yards.

Marshall's first freshman honor was the SEC Freshman of the Week award conferred alongside Gurley for their performance in Georgia's win over Tennessee. Texas A&M quarterback Johnny Manziel was also awarded making it the first time the SEC named three players for an award.

For his second, and best, 100-yard game (September 29, 2012), Marshall had 164 yards and two touchdowns (75 and 72 yards) in 10 carries. The game was Georgia's best rushing game for a single player since Washaun Ealey's 183 yards against Georgia Tech in 2009.

Marshall sustained a season ending injury his sophomore year.

On November 17, 2015, Marshall announced he would enter the NFL draft and not seek another year of eligibility at Georgia.

=== Statistics ===
	Rushing					Receiving				
Year	Att	Yds	Avg	Lng	TD	Rec	Yds	Avg	Lng	TD
2012	117	759	6.5	75	8	11	91	8.3	24	1
2013	56	246	4.4	28	1	8	111	13.9	48	1
2014	12	24	2.0	5	0	1	-5	-5.0	0	0
2015	68	350	5.1	20	3	4	28	7.0	13	1

== Professional career ==
Pre-draft measurables
Height	Weight	Arm length	Hand span	40-yard dash	10-yard split	20-yard split	20-yard shuttle	Three-cone drill	Vertical jump	Bench press
5 ft 11 3/8 in (1.81 m)	219 lb (99 kg)	31 5/8 in (0.80 m)	9 3/8 in (0.24 m)	4.31 s	1.49 s	2.51 s	4.25 s	6.98 s	30 1/2 in (0.77 m)	25 reps
All values from NFL Combine/Pro Day

Marshall ran the fastest 40-yard dash at the 2016 NFL Scouting Combine with a time of 4.31 seconds. He was selected by the Washington Redskins in the seventh round of the 2016 NFL draft with the 242nd overall pick. On August 30, 2016, Marshall was placed on injured reserve.

During training camp for the 2017 season, Marshall tore the patellar tendon in his right knee, ending his season. He was waived on July 25, 2018.

== Personal life ==
Marshall previously roomed with his high school friend and fellow running back Todd Gurley. His younger brother, Marcus, was a running back at Georgia Tech from 2015 through 2016 before he transferred to James Madison in 2017.

James Madison is the alma mater of Marshall's father, Warren Keith Marshall Sr, who is JMU's career leader in rushing yards (4,168, 1982–86). Warren is a Madison Hall of Famer, and played for the Denver Broncos after they selected him in the sixth round of the 1987 NFL draft. Warren set JMU's single-game rushing record of 264 yards in a 1986 victory over unbeaten and third-ranked William and Mary, and he set team career records of 20 100-yard rushing games, three 1,000-yard rushing seasons, 737 rushing attempts and 34 touchdowns. He had 29 career rushing touchdowns and caught five touchdown passes. His 208 career points still ranked second in team history and his 29 rushing touchdowns third at the time of his induction.
