= Terrance Knighton =

American football player and coach (born 1986)

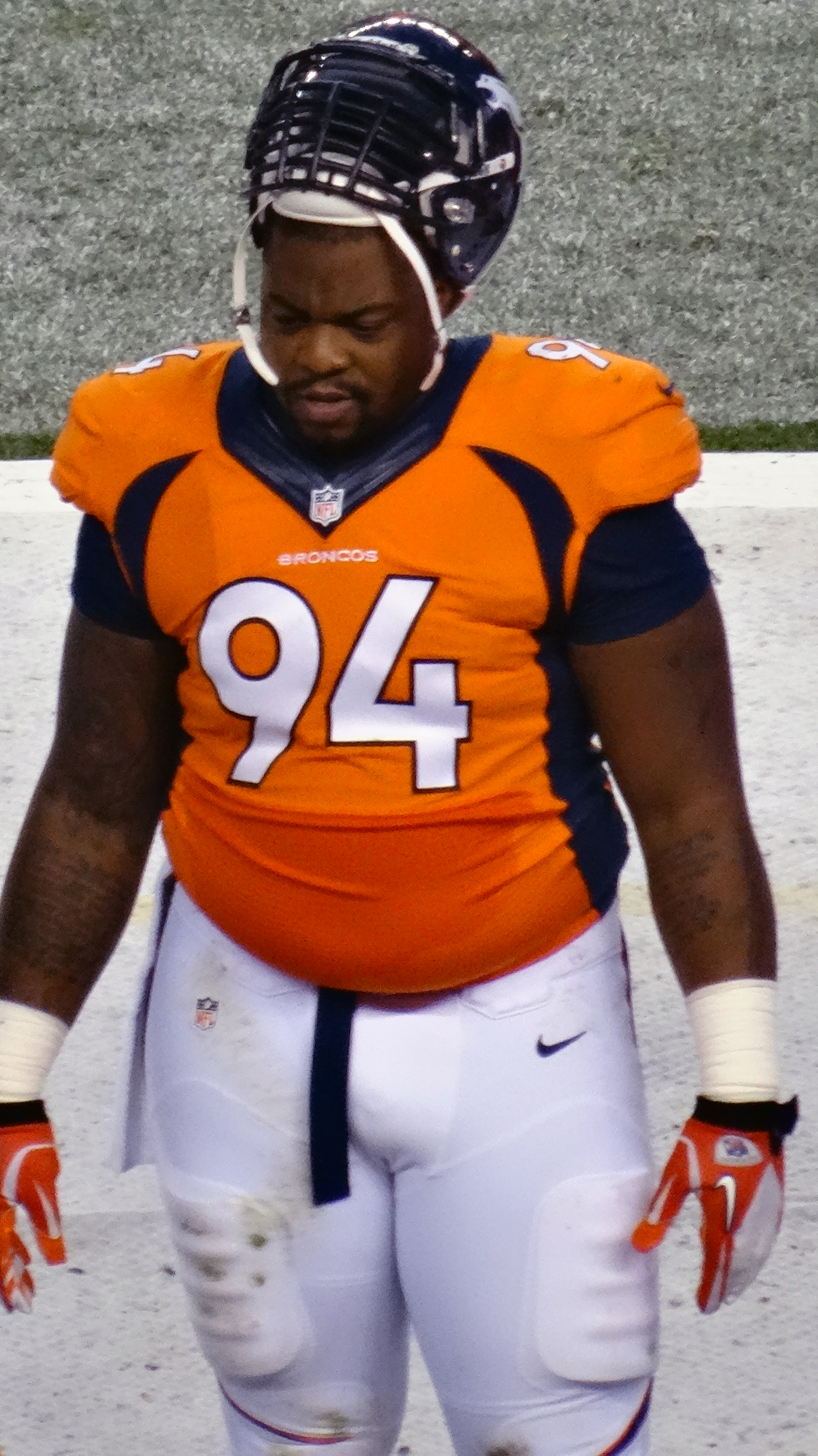
- Knighton with the Denver Broncos in 2013

Florida State Seminoles
- Title: Defensive line coach

Personal information
- Born: July 4, 1986 (age 40); Hartford, Connecticut, U.S.
- Listed height: 6 ft 3 in (1.91 m)
- Listed weight: 354 lb (161 kg)

Career information
- High school: Windsor (CT); Milford Academy (New Berlin, New York)
- College: Temple (2005–2008)
- NFL draft: 2009: 3rd round, 72nd overall pick

Career history

Playing
- Jacksonville Jaguars (2009–2012); Denver Broncos (2013–2014); Washington Redskins (2015); New England Patriots (2016)*
- * Offseason or practice squad member only

Coaching
- Wagner (2019–2020) Defensive line coach; Carolina Panthers (2021–2022) Assistant defensive line coach; Nebraska (2023–2024) Defensive line coach; Florida State (2025–present) Defensive line coach

Awards and highlights
- Sporting News NFL All-Rookie Team (2009); First-team All-MAC (2008); NFL All-Rookie Team as selected by Pro Football Weekly and the Pro Football Writers of America (2009)

Career NFL statistics
- Total tackles: 230
- Sacks: 14.0
- Forced fumbles: 3
- Fumble recoveries: 2
- Interceptions: 2
- Stats at Pro Football Reference

Terrance O'Neil Knighton (born July 4, 1986) is an American football coach and former defensive tackle. He was selected by the Jacksonville Jaguars in the third round of the 2009 NFL draft after playing college football for the Temple Owls. Knighton was nicknamed "Pot Roast" and "Mutton Chop" by his teammates. He also played for the Denver Broncos, Washington Redskins, and spent time with the New England Patriots prior to the 2016 NFL season.

== Early life ==
Knighton attended Windsor High School in Connecticut, where he played both tight end and defensive line, and was teammates with Chris Baker. He earned All-State honors from the coaches association and Hartford Courant All-Area accolades in 2003. He was also a basketball varsity member, earning All-CCC West League honors.

In 2004, he attended Milford Academy in New Berlin, New York, where he again played on both sides of the ball. He made 70 tackles and six sacks in 2004.

Considered a three-star recruit by Rivals.com, Knighton chose Temple University after being denied admission to UCF, the only two scholarship offers he received.

== College career ==
As a true freshman at Temple, Knighton played in 10 games as a reserve before earning a start in the season finale at Navy. For the year, he registered 17 tackles (10 solo), 3.5 TFLs and one forced fumble.

Knighton became a regular starter as a sophomore, and made 57 tackles (32 solo), 6.5 TFLs, three sacks, two FFs, two QBHs and four PBUs over the season. As a junior, he finished the season with 8.5 TFL and a team-best three fumble recoveries.

A team captain as a senior in 2008, Knighton finished the season with 54 tackles, including 35 solos, five break-ups, a team-best three fumble recoveries, a hurry, and blocked kick, and a sack. He became Temple's first First Team All-MAC honoree in school history.

== Professional career ==
=== Pre-draft ===
Despite an up-and-down career, Knighton's draft stock had risen quickly after strong workouts.

Pre-draft measurables
Height	Weight	Arm length	Hand span	40-yard dash	10-yard split	20-yard split	20-yard shuttle	Three-cone drill	Vertical jump	Broad jump	Bench press
6 ft 3 1/8 in (1.91 m)	321 lb (146 kg)	34 1/2 in (0.88 m)	10 in (0.25 m)	4.93 s	1.69 s	2.84 s	4.64 s	7.22 s	29.0 in (0.74 m)	8 ft 9 in (2.67 m)	21 reps
All values from NFL Combine/Pro Day

=== Jacksonville Jaguars ===
Knighton was selected in the third round (72nd overall) by the Jacksonville Jaguars, which was considered a "gamble" or a "reach" by most commentators. Sports Illustrated's Tony Pauline described Knighton as "an athletic defensive tackle who struggles with weight issue", and who "has too much downside for a mid-third-round choice".

Knighton was signed by the Jaguars to a four-year contract on July 31, 2009. His contract, which includes veteran minimum salaries, plus a fourth-year escalator to $1.3 million, could reach nearly $3.32 million. He also received a signing bonus of $843,500. At the end of the 2009 season, Coach Jack Del Rio said, "Terrance Knighton is going to be a real good player. It wasn't an accident before the game that he was made a team captain for the game. I'm counting on him to lead the way." Knighton's career was placed in jeopardy by a serious injury to his eyeball in a bar incident on April 8, 2012. Knighton was able to recover from the incident however, and returned to the field wearing a dark visor at all times.

On November 16, 2012, Knighton was fined $21,000 for a late hit against the Indianapolis Colts on Week 10.

He became a free agent after the 2012 season.

=== Denver Broncos ===
On March 13, 2013, Knighton was signed to two-year contract by the Denver Broncos, where his former Jacksonville coach Jack Del Rio was the defensive coordinator at that time. In his first season with Denver, Knighton recorded 31 tackles, 3 sacks, a fumble recovery and an interception. In the AFC Championship Game, Knighton sacked Tom Brady on a crucial 4th down. His efforts helped the Broncos enter Super Bowl XLVIII, their first Super Bowl in almost 15 years, but lost to the Seattle Seahawks 43–8.

When the Broncos signed DeMarcus Ware in March 2014, Knighton changed his jersey number from 94 to 98 in order for Ware to have it. Ware previously wore number 94 for nine seasons with the Dallas Cowboys.

=== Washington Redskins ===
On March 12, 2015, Knighton signed a one-year, $4 million contract with the Washington Redskins. He played in 15 games for the Redskins in 2015.

=== New England Patriots ===
On March 31, 2016, Knighton signed a one-year, $4.5 million contract with the New England Patriots. Knighton was released on August 29, 2016.

=== Retirement ===
On April 12, 2017, Knighton announced his retirement from the NFL to pursue a career in coaching.

=== NFL awards and honors ===
- Football Futures All-Rookie Team (2009)
- Pro Football Weekly All-Rookie Team (2009)
- Sporting News All-Rookie Team (2009)

== NFL career statistics ==
Legend
**Bold**	Career high

=== Regular season ===
Year	Team	Games		Tackles					Interceptions					Fumbles			
Year	Team	GP	GS	Cmb	Solo	Ast	Sck	TFL	Int	Yds	TD	Lng	PD	FF	FR	Yds	TD
2009	JAX	**16**	**16**	**45**	**34**	11	1.5	**6**	0	0	0	0	1	1	**1**	0	0
2010	JAX	**16**	**16**	34	24	10	**4.0**	5	**1**	-3	0	-3	**4**	0	0	0	0
2011	JAX	13	13	29	17	12	0.0	4	0	0	0	0	0	0	0	0	0
2012	JAX	**16**	4	32	20	12	2.0	5	0	0	0	0	2	**2**	0	0	0
2013	DEN	**16**	**16**	31	18	**13**	3.0	5	**1**	**2**	0	**2**	1	0	**1**	**13**	0
2014	DEN	**16**	**16**	30	18	12	2.0	4	0	0	0	0	3	0	0	0	0
2015	WAS	15	15	29	17	12	1.5	5	0	0	0	0	0	0	0	0	0
		108	96	230	148	82	14.0	34	2	-1	0	2	11	3	2	13	0

=== Playoffs ===
Year	Team	Games		Tackles					Interceptions					Fumbles			
Year	Team	GP	GS	Cmb	Solo	Ast	Sck	TFL	Int	Yds	TD	Lng	PD	FF	FR	Yds	TD
2013	DEN	**3**	**3**	**12**	**10**	**2**	**1.0**	**3**	0	0	0	0	0	0	0	0	0
2014	DEN	1	1	3	1	**2**	0.0	0	0	0	0	0	0	0	0	0	0
2015	WAS	1	1	1	1	0	0.0	1	0	0	0	0	0	0	0	0	0
		5	5	16	12	4	1.0	4	0	0	0	0	0	0	0	0	0

== Coaching career ==
Knighton joined the coaching staff at Wagner in 2019 as defensive line coach. He joined the Carolina Panthers coaching staff as a coaching assistant in 2021.

On November 29, 2022, Knighton left the Panthers to join Matt Rhule's coaching staff at the University of Nebraska-Lincoln as the new defensive line coach.

== Personal life ==
Knighton earned the nickname "Pot Roast" when former Jaguars linebacker Clint Ingram overheard Knighton's meal order on a road trip. He has been childhood friends with Cincinnati Bengals defensive end Chris Baker since high school, where the two of them were teammates. The two were teammates again for one season in their professional careers when Knighton signed with the Redskins in 2015. Knighton also served as Baker's best man in his wedding to ESPN talent producer Jamila Phillips.

Knighton suffered an eye injury during a late-night incident at a Jacksonville nightclub. He temporarily lost vision and required surgery to remove a cataract that formed for protection. His vision slowly returned.

Knighton appeared in a series of commercials for Bridgestone tires, including "Empty Fridge" and "Treadmill."

Knighton began suffering from cluster headache episodes when he was a teenager. He missed a game in 2015 due to the condition.
