= 2018 Washington Redskins season =

87th season in franchise history

- Owner: Daniel Snyder
- President: Bruce Allen
- Head coach: Jay Gruden
- Offensive coordinator: Matt Cavanaugh
- Defensive coordinator: Greg Manusky
- Home stadium: FedExField

Results
- Record: 7–9
- Division place: 3rd NFC East
- Playoffs: Did not qualify
- Pro Bowlers: OT Trent Williams; LB Ryan Kerrigan

Uniform
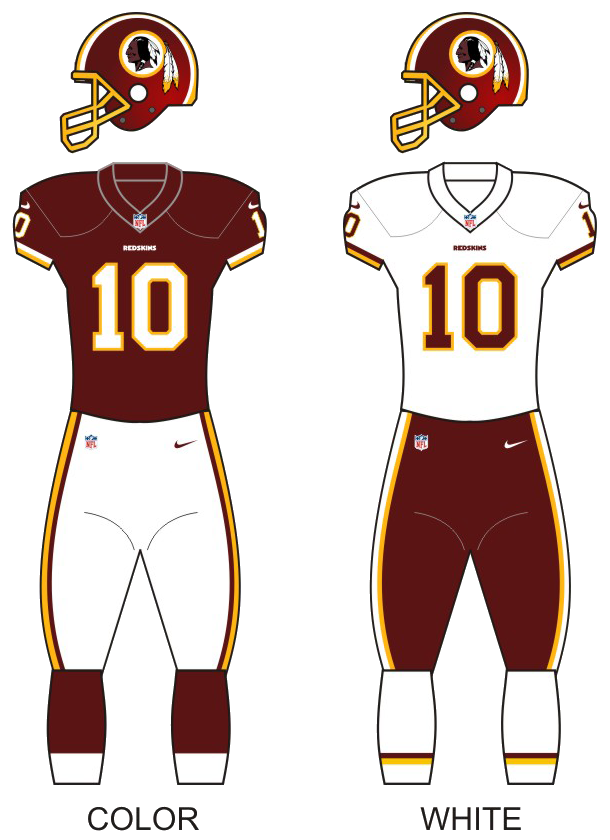

The 2018 season was the Washington Redskins' 87th in the National Football League (NFL) and their fifth under head coach Jay Gruden. This was the first season since 2011 that quarterback Kirk Cousins was not on the roster, as he joined the Minnesota Vikings in the offseason as a free agent.

The team tied their record from the previous season, and missed the playoffs for the third straight season. Despite a 6–3 start which was their best since 2008 plus leading the NFC East, the team suffered a late-season collapse, suffering four straight losses after the team lost their starting quarterback Alex Smith to a catastrophic leg injury in their Week 11 loss to the Houston Texans. This would cause Smith to miss both the remainder of the 2018 season and the entire 2019 season as Smith stated that he had taken a total of 17 surgeries to repair his leg and nearly had it amputated. Smith's injury also resulted in a quarterback hangover. First, it forced Colt McCoy into the starting role in Weeks 12 and 13 before also suffering a leg injury in a 28–13 loss to the Philadelphia Eagles in Week 13, thus forcing the Redskins to start journeyman quarterback Mark Sanchez in Week 14 before starting another journeyman quarterback Josh Johnson against the Jacksonville Jaguars after benching Sanchez at halftime against the New York Giants. After the Alex Smith injury, the Redskins finished the last 7 games of the season with a record of 1–6. They were eliminated from playoff contention with a loss to the Titans, including wins by the Seahawks and Vikings. The team's season ended with 25 players on injured reserve, which was a league high.

== Draft ==
2018 Washington Redskins draft
Round	Selection	Player	Position	College	Notes
1	13	Daron Payne	NT	Alabama	
2	59	Derrius Guice	RB	LSU	From San Francisco
3	74	Geron Christian	OT	Louisville	From San Francisco
4	109	Troy Apke	S	Penn State	From Denver
5	163	Tim Settle	NT	Virginia Tech	From Denver
6	197	Shaun Dion Hamilton	LB	Alabama	From LA Rams
7	241	Greg Stroman	CB	Virginia Tech	From LA Rams
7	256	Trey Quinn	WR	SMU	From LA Rams

Draft trades

- The Redskins traded their third-round selection (78th overall) and cornerback Kendall Fuller to Kansas City in exchange for quarterback Alex Smith.
- The Redskins traded safety Su'a Cravens and their fourth- (No. 113 overall) and fifth- (No. 149 overall) round selections to Denver in exchange for Denver's fourth- (No. 109 overall), two fifth-round selections (Nos. 142 and 163 overall) and a conditional 2020 selection.
- The Redskins traded their sixth-round selection (No. 188 overall) to Cleveland in exchange for quarterback Kevin Hogan and Cleveland's sixth-round selection (No. 205 overall).
- The Redskins traded tight end Derek Carrier to the Los Angeles Rams in exchange for the Rams' seventh-round selection (241st overall).

Supplemental Draft

- The Redskins selected Virginia Tech cornerback Adonis Alexander in the 2018 Supplemental draft. As a result, the team forfeited their 6th-round selection in the 2019 NFL draft.

== Staff ==
2018 Washington Redskins staff
Front office: Owner – Daniel Snyder; President – Bruce Allen; Senior vice president of player personnel – Doug Williams; Senior vice president of football operations – Eric Schaffer; Director of pro personnel – Alex Santos; Director of college scouting – Kyle Smith; Head coaches: Head coach – Jay Gruden; Assistant head coach/offensive line – Bill Callahan; Offensive coaches: Offensive coordinator – Matt Cavanaugh; Quarterbacks & passing game coordinator – Kevin O'Connell; Running backs – Randy Jordan; Wide receivers – Ike Hilliard; Tight ends – Wes Phillips; Assistant offensive line – Phil Rauscher; Offensive quality control – Chris O'Hara	Defensive coaches: Defensive coordinator – Greg Manusky; Defensive line – Jim Tomsula; Outside linebackers – Chad Grimm; Inside linebackers – Kirk Olivadotti; Defensive backs – Torrian Gray; Assistant defensive backs – James Rowe; Defensive quality control – Cannon Matthews; Special teams coaches: Special teams coordinator – Ben Kotwica; Assistant special teams – Bret Munsey; Strength and conditioning: Director of player development – Malcolm Blacken; Head strength and conditioning – Chad Englehart; Assistant strength and conditioning – Kavan Latham; Assistant strength and conditioning/nutritionist – Jake Sankal; Player development assistant – Danny Meehan; Head athletic trainer – Larry Hess

== Final roster ==
2018 Washington Redskins roster
Quarterbacks (QB): 8 Josh Johnson; 6 Mark Sanchez; Running backs (RB): 34 Byron Marshall; 32 Samaje Perine; 26 Adrian Peterson; 25 Chris Thompson; Wide receivers (WR): 16 Jehu Chesson; 80 Jamison Crowder; 18 Josh Doctson; 17 Michael Floyd; 84 Darvin Kidsy; Tight ends (TE): 85 Vernon Davis; 88 Matt Flanagan; 82 J. P. Holtz; 87 Jeremy Sprinkle	Offensive linemen (OL): 69 Luke Bowanko C; 66 Tony Bergstrom G; 62 Kyle Fuller C; 67 Zac Kerin G; 76 Morgan Moses T; 79 Ty Nsekhe G/T; 61 Timon Parris T; 73 Chase Roullier C; 71 Trent Williams T; Defensive linemen (DL): 93 Jonathan Allen DE; 99 Caleb Brantley DE; 98 Matt Ioannidis DE; 92 Stacy McGee DE; 95 Daron Payne NT; 97 Tim Settle NT	Linebackers (LB): 52 Ryan Anderson OLB; 53 Zach Brown ILB; 46 Marquis Flowers OLB; 54 Mason Foster ILB; 51 Shaun Dion Hamilton ILB; 40 Josh Harvey-Clemons ILB; 91 Ryan Kerrigan OLB; 96 Pernell McPhee OLB; 58 Marcus Smith OLB; 94 Preston Smith OLB; 56 Zach Vigil ILB; Defensive backs (DB): 39 Adonis Alexander CB; 36 Alex Carter CB; 20 Ha Ha Clinton-Dix SS; 22 Deshazor Everett CB/S; 48 Harlan Miller FS; 31 Fabian Moreau CB; 24 Josh Norman CB; 45 Jeremy Reaves FS; 37 Greg Stroman CB; Special teams (ST): 55 Andrew East LS; 3 Dustin Hopkins K; 5 Tress Way P	Practice squad: 44 Josh Carraway OLB; 15 Montay Crockett WR; 55 Casey Dunn C (PS/I); 33 Russell Hansbrough RB; 11 Carlos Henderson WR; 63 Roubbens Joseph T; 18 ArDarius Stewart WR; 28 Jack Tocho CB; 64 JoJo Wicker DE; Reserve: 11 Alex Smith QB (IR); 30 Troy Apke FS (IR); 68 Tyler Catalina G (IR); 74 Geron Christian T (IR); 72 Jonathan Cooper G (IR); 19 Robert Davis WR (IR); 23 Quinton Dunbar CB (IR); 56 Reuben Foster ILB (Exempt); 82 Manasseh Garner TE (IR); 29 Derrius Guice RB (IR); 13 Maurice Harris WR (IR); 38 Joshua Holsey CB (IR); 78 Austin Howard G (IR); 41 Danny Johnson CB (IR); 20 Robert Kelley RB (IR); 60 Arie Kouandjio G (IR); 77 Shawn Lauvao G (IR); 12 Colt McCoy QB (IR); 58 Cassanova McKinzy OLB (IR); 35 Montae Nicholson SS (NF-Inj.); 14 Trey Quinn WR (IR); 86 Jordan Reed TE (IR); 10 Paul Richardson WR (IR); 75 Brandon Scherff G (IR); 89 Cam Sims WR (IR); 57 Nick Sundberg LS (IR); Rookies in italics 53 active, 27 reserve, 8 practice squad

== Preseason ==
Week	Date	Opponent	Result	Record	Venue	Recap
1	August 9	at New England Patriots	L 17–26	0–1	Gillette Stadium	Recap
2	August 16	New York Jets	W 15–13	1–1	FedExField	Recap
3	August 24	Denver Broncos	L 17–29	1–2	FedExField	Recap
4	August 30	at Baltimore Ravens	L 20–30	1–3	M&T Bank Stadium	Recap

== Regular season ==
=== Schedule ===
Week	Date	Opponent	Result	Record	Venue	Recap
1	September 9	at Arizona Cardinals	**W** 24–6	1–0	State Farm Stadium	Recap
2	September 16	Indianapolis Colts	**L** 9–21	1–1	FedExField	Recap
3	September 23	Green Bay Packers	**W** 31–17	2–1	FedExField	Recap
4	Bye					
5	October 8	at New Orleans Saints	**L** 19–43	2–2	Mercedes-Benz Superdome	Recap
6	October 14	Carolina Panthers	**W** 23–17	3–2	FedExField	Recap
7	October 21	**Dallas Cowboys**	**W** 20–17	4–2	FedExField	Recap
8	October 28	at **New York Giants**	**W** 20–13	5–2	MetLife Stadium	Recap
9	November 4	Atlanta Falcons	**L** 14–38	5–3	FedExField	Recap
10	November 11	at Tampa Bay Buccaneers	**W** 16–3	6–3	Raymond James Stadium	Recap
11	November 18	Houston Texans	**L** 21–23	6–4	FedExField	Recap
12	November 22	at **Dallas Cowboys**	**L** 23–31	6–5	AT&T Stadium	Recap
13	December 3	at **Philadelphia Eagles**	**L** 13–28	6–6	Lincoln Financial Field	Recap
14	December 9	**New York Giants**	**L** 16–40	6–7	FedExField	Recap
15	December 16	at Jacksonville Jaguars	**W** 16–13	7–7	TIAA Bank Field	Recap
16	December 22	at Tennessee Titans	**L** 16–25	7–8	Nissan Stadium	Recap
17	December 30	**Philadelphia Eagles**	**L** 0–24	7–9	FedExField	Recap

Note: Intra-division opponents are in bold text.

=== Game summaries ===
==== Week 1: at Arizona Cardinals ====
Week One: Washington Redskins at Arizona Cardinals – Game summary

Quarter	1	2	3	4	Total
**Redskins**	0	21	0	3	**24**
Cardinals	0	0	0	6	**6**

at State Farm Stadium, Glendale, Arizona

- Date: September 9
- Game time: 4:25 p.m. EDT/1:25 p.m. MST
- Game weather: Played indoors (retractable roof closed)
- Game attendance: 61,613
- Referee: Walt Coleman
- TV announcers (Fox): Thom Brennaman, Chris Spielman and Shannon Spake
- Recap, Gamebook

Game information

**First quarter**

- No scoring plays.

**Second quarter**

- WAS – Chris Thompson 13-yard pass from Alex Smith (Dustin Hopkins kick), 15:00. Redskins 7–0. **Drive: 11 plays, 80 yards, 5:53.**
- WAS – Adrian Peterson 1-yard run (Dustin Hopkins kick), 4:12. Redskins 14–0. **Drive: 15 plays, 73 yards, 9:06.**
- WAS – Jordan Reed 4-yard pass from Alex Smith (Dustin Hopkins kick), 0:12. Redskins 21–0. **Drive: 10 plays, 92 yards, 3:11.**

**Third quarter**

- No scoring plays.

**Fourth quarter**

- WAS – Dustin Hopkins 31-yard field goal, 12:16. Redskins 24–0. **Drive: 10 plays, 63 yards, 4:42.**
- ARI – David Johnson 2-yard run (pass failed), 5:51. Redskins 24–6. **Drive: 13 plays, 75 yards, 6:26.**

**Top passers**

- WAS – Alex Smith – 21/30, 255 yards, 2 TD
- ARI – Sam Bradford – 20/34, 153 yards, INT

**Top rushers**

- WAS – Adrian Peterson – 26 rushes, 96 yards, TD
- ARI – David Johnson – 9 rushes, 37 yards, TD

**Top receivers**

- WAS – Chris Thompson – 6 receptions, 63 yards, TD
- ARI – Larry Fitzgerald – 7 receptions, 76 yards

The Redskins started off 1–0.

==== Week 2: vs. Indianapolis Colts ====
Week Two: Indianapolis Colts at Washington Redskins – Game summary

Quarter	1	2	3	4	Total
**Colts**	7	7	0	7	**21**
Redskins	0	3	3	3	**9**

at FedEx Field, Landover, Maryland

- Date: September 16
- Game time: 1:00 pm. EDT
- Game weather: 71 °F (22 °C), cloudy
- Game attendance: 57,013
- Referee: Clete Blakeman
- TV announcers (CBS): Spero Dedes and Adam Archuleta
- Recap, Gamebook

Game information

**First quarter**

- IND – Eric Ebron 7-yard pass from Andrew Luck (Adam Vinatieri kick), 9:25. Colts 7–0. **Drive: 11 plays, 75 yards, 5:35.**

**Second quarter**

- WAS – Dustin Hopkins 49-yard field goal, 11:12. Colts 7–3. **Drive: 5 plays, 27 yards, 1:57.**
- IND – Nyheim Hines 8-yard run (Adam Vinatieri kick), 6:51. Colts 14–3. **Drive: 8 plays, 75 yards, 4:21.**

**Third quarter**

- WAS – Dustin Hopkins 27-yard field goal, 5:40. Colts 14–6. **Drive: 7 plays, 20 yards, 3:37.**

**Fourth quarter**

- WAS – Dustin Hopkins 49-yard field goal, 13:28. Colts 14–9. **Drive: 11 plays, 42 yards, 6:07.**
- IND – T. Y. Hilton 3-yard pass from Andrew Luck (Adam Vinatieri kick), 7:32. Colts 21–9. **Drive: 13 plays, 75 yards, 5:56.**

**Top passers**

- IND – Andrew Luck – 21/31, 179 yards, 2 TD, 2 INT
- WAS – Alex Smith – 33/46, 292 yards

**Top rushers**

- IND – Jordan Wilkins – 10 carries, 61 yards
- WAS – Jamison Crowder – 2 carries, 29 yards

**Top receivers**

- IND – T. Y. Hilton – 11 receptions, 83 yards, 1 TD
- WAS – Chris Thompson – 13 receptions, 92 yards

Washington lost to Indianapolis, moving to 1–1.

==== Week 3: vs. Green Bay Packers ====
Week Three: Green Bay Packers at Washington Redskins – Game summary

Quarter	1	2	3	4	Total
Packers	0	10	7	0	**17**
**Redskins**	14	14	0	3	**31**

at FedEx Field, Landover, Maryland

- Date: September 23
- Game time: 1:00 pm. EDT
- Game weather: 62 °F (17 °C), rain
- Game attendance: 59,827
- Referee: Craig Wrolstad
- TV announcers (Fox): Kevin Burkhardt, Charles Davis and Pam Oliver
- Recap, Gamebook

Game information

First quarter

- WAS – Paul Richardson 46-yard pass from Alex Smith (Dustin Hopkins kick), 13:02. Redskins 7–0. **Drive: 4 plays, 75 yards, 2:06.**
- WAS – Adrian Peterson 2-yard run (Dustin Hopkins kick), 2:16. Redskins 14–0. **Drive: 10 plays, 79 yards, 6:04.**

Second quarter

- GB – Mason Crosby 41-yard field goal, 12:56. Redskins 14–3. **Drive: 9 plays, 52 yards, 4:22.**
- WAS – Jamison Crowder 9-yard pass from Alex Smith (Dustin Hopkins kick), 4:30. Redskins 21–3. **Drive: 8 plays, 98 yards, 3:14.**
- GB – Geronimo Allison 64-yard pass from Aaron Rodgers (Mason Crosby kick), 2:24. Redskins 21–10. **Drive: 4 plays, 76 yards, 2:11.**
- WAS – Adrian Peterson 2-yard run (Dustin Hopkins kick), 0:28. Redskins 28–10. **Drive: 5 plays, 74 yards, 1:54.**

Third quarter

- GB – Davante Adams 2-yard pass from Aaron Rodgers (Mason Crosby kick), 8:02. Redskins 28–17. **Drive: 15 plays, 75 yards, 7:02.**

Fourth quarter

- WAS – Dustin Hopkins 35-yard field goal, 02:00. Redskins 31–17. **Drive: 8 plays, 29 yards, 3:25.**

Top passers

- GB – Aaron Rodgers – 27/44, 265 yards, 2 TD
- WAS – Alex Smith – 12/20, 220 yards, 2 TD, INT

Top rushers

- GB – Aaron Jones – 6 rushes, 42 yards
- WAS – Adrian Peterson – 19 rushes, 120 yards, 2 TD

Top receivers

- GB – Davante Adams – 7 receptions, 52 yards, TD
- WAS – Jordan Reed – 4 receptions, 65 yards

The Redskins fought back and started a 2–1 record, heading to their bye week.

==== Week 5: at New Orleans Saints ====
Week Five: Washington Redskins at New Orleans Saints – Game summary

Quarter	1	2	3	4	Total
Redskins	3	10	0	6	**19**
**Saints**	6	20	14	3	**43**

at Mercedes-Benz Superdome, New Orleans, Louisiana

- Date: October 8
- Game time: 8:15 pm. EDT/7:15 p.m. CDT
- Game weather: Played indoors (dome stadium)
- Game attendance: 73,028
- Referee: Carl Cheffers
- TV announcers (ESPN/WJLA): Joe Tessitore, Jason Witten, Booger McFarland and Lisa Salters
- Recap, Gamebook

Game information

**First quarter**

- NO – Mark Ingram II 2-yard run (kick failed), 10:41. Saints 6–0. **Drive: 6 plays, 64 yards, 3:13.**
- WAS – Dustin Hopkins 37-yard field goal, 2:37. Saints 6–3. **Drive: 15 plays, 56 yards, 8:04.**

**Second quarter**

- NO – Josh Hill 1-yard pass from Drew Brees (Wil Lutz kick), 10:38. Saints 13–3. **Drive: 13 plays, 75 yards, 6:59.**
- WAS – Dustin Hopkins 53-yard field goal, 8:36. Saints 13–6. **Drive: 6 plays, 40 yards, 2:02.**
- NO – Mark Ingram II 1-yard run (Wil Lutz kick), 3:43. Saints 20–6. **Drive: 10 plays, 75 yards, 4:53.**
- NO – Tre'Quan Smith 62-yard pass from Drew Brees (run failed), 2:36. Saints 26–6. **Drive: 1 plays, 62 yards, 0:10.**
- WAS – Alex Smith 4-yard run (Dustin Hopkins kick), 0:26. Saints 26–13. **Drive: 3 plays, 16 yards, 0:56.**

**Third quarter**

- NO – Tre'Quan Smith 35-yard pass from Drew Brees (Wil Lutz kick), 12:23. Saints 33–13. **Drive: 5 plays, 74 yards, 2:37.**
- NO – Taysom Hill 1-yard run (Wil Lutz kick), 6:43. Saints 40–13. **Drive: 2 plays, 4 yards, 1:00.**

**Fourth quarter**

- NO – Wil Lutz 44-yard field goal, 14:10. Saints 43–13. **Drive: 6 plays, 22 yards, 3:09.**
- WAS – Kapri Bibbs 1-yard run (pass failed), 10:25. Saints 43–19. **Drive: 7 plays, 75 yards, 3:42.**

**Top passers**

- WAS – Alex Smith – 23/39, 275 yards, 1 INT
- NO – Drew Brees – 26/29, 363 yards, 3 TD

**Top rushers**

- WAS – Chris Thompson – 8 carries, 17 yards
- NO – Mark Ingram II – 16 carries, 53 yards, 2 TD

**Top receivers**

- WAS – Chris Thompson – 6 receptions, 45 yards
- NO – Cameron Meredith – 5 receptions, 71 yards

The Redskins hoped to get revenge for their loss in this game a year ago, where they blew a 31-16 lead with three minutes remaining and lost in overtime. Instead, the Redskins got blown out. This game was the point where Drew Brees passed Brett Favre and Peyton Manning on most passing yards. The Redskins fell to 2–2.

==== Week 6: vs. Carolina Panthers ====
Week Six: Carolina Panthers at Washington Redskins – Game summary

Quarter	1	2	3	4	Total
Panthers	0	6	3	8	**17**
**Redskins**	14	3	0	6	**23**

at FedEx Field, Landover, Maryland

- Date: October 14
- Game time: 1:00 pm. EDT
- Game weather: 52 °F (11 °C), cloudy
- Game attendance: 60,482
- Referee: Clay Martin
- TV announcers (Fox): Kenny Albert, Charles Davis and Pam Oliver
- Recap, Gamebook

Game information

First quarter

- WAS – Vernon Davis 22-yard pass from Alex Smith (Dustin Hopkins kick), 10:20. Redskins 7–0. **Drive: 1 plays, 22 yards, 0:06.**
- WAS – Paul Richardson 2-yard pass from Alex Smith (Dustin Hopkins kick), 3:02. Redskins 14–0. **Drive: 12 plays, 64 yards, 6:14.**

Second quarter

- WAS – Dustin Hopkins 49-yard field goal, 5:30. Redskins 17–0. **Drive: 10 plays, 36 yards, 5:54.**
- CAR – Devin Funchess 23-yard pass from Cam Newton (kick failed), 3:05. Redskins 17–6. **Drive: 7 plays, 75 yards, 2:25.**

Third quarter

- CAR – Graham Gano 32-yard field goal, 5:08. Redskins 17–9. **Drive: 11 plays, 47 yards, 5:32.**

Fourth quarter

- WAS – Dustin Hopkins 56-yard field goal, 12:40. Redskins 20–9. **Drive: 12 plays, 42 yards, 7:28.**
- CAR – Torrey Smith 3-yard pass from Cam Newton (Cam Newton-Torrey Smith pass), 8:32. Redskins 20–17. **Drive: 9 plays, 75 yards, 4:08.**
- WAS – Dustin Hopkins 29-yard field goal, 3:15. Redskins 23–17. **Drive: 10 plays, 64 yards, 5:17.**

Top passers

- CAR – Cam Newton - 27/40, 275 yards, 2 TD, INT
- WAS – Alex Smith - 21/36, 163 yards, 2 TD

Top rushers

- CAR – Cam Newton - 9 rushes, 43 yards
- WAS – Adrian Peterson - 17 rushes, 97 yards

Top receivers

- CAR – Devin Funchess - 5 receptions, 74 yards, TD
- WAS – Vernon Davis - 3 receptions, 48 yards, TD

This marked the first time since 2006 that the Redskins had defeated the Panthers. Then the Redskins started a 3 game winning streak and improved to 3–2.

==== Week 7: vs. Dallas Cowboys ====
Week Seven: Dallas Cowboys at Washington Redskins – Game summary

Quarter	1	2	3	4	Total
Cowboys	0	7	0	10	**17**
**Redskins**	7	0	3	10	**20**

at FedEx Field, Landover, Maryland

- Date: October 21
- Game time: 4:25 pm. EDT
- Game weather: 52 °F (11 °C), sunny
- Game attendance: 66,301
- Referee: John Hussey
- TV announcers (CBS): Jim Nantz, Tony Romo and Tracy Wolfson
- Recap, Gamebook

Game information

**First quarter**

- WAS – Kapri Bibbs 23-yard pass from Alex Smith (Dustin Hopkins kick), 10:19. Redskins 7–0. **Drive: 6 plays, 52 yards, 3:13.**

**Second quarter**

- DAL – Michael Gallup 49-yard pass from Dak Prescott (Brett Maher kick), 1:00. Tied 7–7. **Drive: 6 plays, 83 yards, 2:46.**

**Third quarter**

- WAS – Dustin Hopkins 21-yard field goal, 9:10. Redskins 10–7. **Drive: 10 plays, 72 yards, 5:50.**

**Fourth quarter**

- WAS – Dustin Hopkins 25-yard field goal, 12:35. Redskins 13–7. **Drive: 8 plays, 44 yards, 4:48.**
- DAL – Brett Maher 47-yard field goal, 9:46. Redskins 13–10. **Drive: 6 plays, 46 yards, 2:49.**
- WAS – Preston Smith 1-yard fumble return (Dustin Hopkins kick), 4:55. Redskins 20–10.
- DAL – Dak Prescott 1-yard run (Brett Maher kick), 1:37. Redskins 20–17. **Drive: 12 plays, 74 yards, 3:18.**

**Top passers**

- DAL – Dak Prescott – 22/35, 273 yards, 1 TD
- WAS – Alex Smith – 14/25, 178 yards, 1 TD

**Top rushers**

- DAL – Ezekiel Elliott – 15 carries, 33 yards
- WAS – Adrian Peterson – 24 carries, 99 yards

**Top receivers**

- DAL – Cole Beasley – 7 receptions, 56 yards
- WAS – Kapri Bibbs – 4 receptions, 43 yards, 1 TD

The Redskins got their first win over the Cowboys at home since 2012. Also, Preston Smith forced a fumble returned for a touchdown off Dak Prescott. As time expired, Cowboys kicker Brett Maher missed the potential game-tying 52-yard field goal to give the Redskins the win. This was their final win against the Cowboys at home and in any contest, as the Redskins changed their name in 2020. With this win, the Redskins improved to 4–2.

==== Week 8: at New York Giants ====
Week Eight: Washington Redskins at New York Giants – Game summary

Quarter	1	2	3	4	Total
**Redskins**	7	0	3	10	**20**
Giants	0	3	0	10	**13**

at MetLife Stadium, East Rutherford, New Jersey

- Date: October 28
- Game time: 1:00 pm. EDT
- Game weather: 51 °F (11 °C), cloudy
- Game attendance: 77,537
- Referee: Bill Vinovich
- TV announcers (Fox): Kenny Albert, Charles Davis and Pam Oliver
- Recap, Gamebook

Game information

**First quarter**

- WAS – Adrian Peterson 7-yard pass from Alex Smith (Dustin Hopkins kick), 2:53. Redskins 7–0. **Drive: 10 plays, 73 yards, 5:28.**

**Second quarter**

- NYG – Aldrick Rosas 37-yard field goal, 1:16. Redskins 7–3. **Drive: 9 plays, 51 yards, 2:03.**

**Third quarter**

- WAS – Dustin Hopkins 53-yard field goal, 4:51. Redskins 10–3. **Drive: 7 plays, 20 yards, 2:20.**

**Fourth quarter**

- WAS – Dustin Hopkins 39-yard field goal, 9:53. Redskins 13–3. **Drive: 7 plays, 47 yards, 4:27.**
- NYG – Aldrick Rosas 21-yard field goal, 4:08. Redskins 13–6. **Drive: 6 plays, 83 yards, 1:04.**
- WAS – Adrian Peterson 64-yard run (Dustin Hopkins kick), 3:06. Redskins 20–6. **Drive: 3 plays, 75 yards, 1:02.**
- NYG – Evan Engram 2-yard pass from Eli Manning (Aldrick Rosas kick), 0:17. Redskins 20–13. **Drive: 16 plays, 70 yards, 2:49.**

**Top passers**

- WAS – Alex Smith – 20/32, 178 yards, 1 TD
- NYG – Eli Manning – 30/47, 316 yards, 1 TD, 2 INT

**Top rushers**

- WAS – Adrian Peterson – 26 carries, 149 yards, 1 TD
- NYG – Saquon Barkley – 13 carries, 38 yards

**Top receivers**

- WAS – Josh Doctson – 5 receptions, 49 yards
- NYG – Odell Beckham Jr. – 8 receptions, 136 yards

The Redskins improved to 5–2. This was the team's final win against a divisional opponent as the "Redskins", as they would terminate the branding two years later. Washington would not win against a divisional opponent again until 2020, and would not defeat the Giants again until 2021.

==== Week 9: vs. Atlanta Falcons ====
Week Nine: Atlanta Falcons at Washington Redskins – Game summary

Quarter	1	2	3	4	Total
**Falcons**	7	14	7	10	**38**
Redskins	0	7	7	0	**14**

at FedEx Field, Landover, Maryland

- Date: November 4
- Game time: 1:00 pm. EST
- Game weather: 55 °F (13 °C), sunny
- Game attendance: 62,386
- Referee: Walt Anderson
- TV announcers (Fox): Kevin Burkhardt, Charles Davis and Pam Oliver
- Preview, Gamebook

Game information

**First quarter**

- ATL – Tevin Coleman 39-yard pass from Matt Ryan (Giorgio Tavecchio kick), 9:46. Falcons 7–0. **Drive: 7 plays, 81 yards, 3:04.**

**Second quarter**

- ATL – Ito Smith 12-yard run (Giorgio Tavecchio kick), 9:10. Falcons 14–0. **Drive: 9 plays, 68 yards, 4:19.**
- WAS – Josh Doctson 2-yard pass from Alex Smith (Dustin Hopkins kick), 3:10. Falcons 14–7. **Drive: 11 plays, 80 yards, 6:00.**
- ATL – Calvin Ridley 40-yard pass from Matt Ryan (Giorgio Tavecchio kick), 0:28. Falcons 21–7. **Drive: 7 plays, 75 yards, 2:42.**

**Third quarter**

- ATL – Tevin Coleman 10-yard pass from Matt Ryan (Giorgio Tavecchio kick), 9:58. Falcons 28–7. **Drive: 8 plays, 75 yards, 5:02.**
- WAS – Kapri Bibbs 3-yard run (Dustin Hopkins kick), 2:15. Falcons 28–14. **Drive: 9 plays, 77 yards, 3:42.**

**Fourth quarter**

- ATL – Giorgio Tavecchio 27-yard field goal, 7:09. Falcons 31–14. **Drive: 10 plays, 72 yards, 6:43.**
- ATL – Julio Jones 35-yard pass from Matt Ryan (Giorgio Tavecchio kick), 3:42. Falcons 38–14. **Drive: 6 plays, 56 yards, 3:16.**

**Top passers**

- ATL – Matt Ryan – 26/38, 250 yards, 4 TD, 1 INT
- WAS – Alex Smith – 30/46, 306 yards, 1 TD, 1 INT

**Top rushers**

- ATL – Tevin Coleman – 13 carries, 88 yards
- WAS – Alex Smith – 1 carries, 22 yards

**Top receivers**

- ATL – Julio Jones – 7 receptions, 121 yards, 1 TD
- WAS – Maurice Harris – 10 receptions, 124 yards

The Redskins fell to 5–3. As of the 2024 season, this currently remains Washington's latest loss to Atlanta.

==== Week 10: at Tampa Bay Buccaneers ====
Week Ten: Washington Redskins at Tampa Bay Buccaneers – Game summary

Quarter	1	2	3	4	Total
**Redskins**	3	3	0	10	**16**
Buccaneers	0	3	0	0	**3**

at Raymond James Stadium, Tampa, Florida

- Date: November 11
- Game time: 1:00 pm. EST
- Game weather: 82 °F (28 °C), clear
- Game attendance: 52,667
- Referee: Brad Allen
- TV announcers (Fox): Thom Brennaman, Chris Spielman and Shannon Spake
- Recap, Gamebook

Game information

**First quarter**

- WAS – Dustin Hopkins 43-yard field goal, 0:10. Redskins 3–0. **Drive: 8 plays, 55 yards, 4:08.**

**Second quarter**

- TB – Chandler Catanzaro 33-yard field goal, 2:03. Tied 3–3. **Drive: 9 plays, 63 yards, 3:55.**
- WAS – Dustin Hopkins 43-yard field goal, 0:20. Redskins 6–3. **Drive: 11 plays, 50 yards, 1:43.**

**Third quarter**

- No scoring plays.

**Fourth quarter**

- WAS – Josh Doctson 6-yard pass from Alex Smith (Dustin Hopkins kick), 14:07. Redskins 13–3. **Drive: 8 plays, 62 yards, 5:01.**
- WAS – Dustin Hopkins 26-yard field goal, 12:03. Redskins 16–3. **Drive: 4 plays, 6 yards, 1:56.**

**Top passers**

- WAS – Alex Smith – 19/27, 178 yards, TD
- TB – Ryan Fitzpatrick – 29/41, 406 yards, 2 INT

**Top rushers**

- WAS – Adrian Peterson – 19 carries, 68 yards
- TB – Peyton Barber – 13 carries, 61 yards

**Top receivers**

- WAS – Maurice Harris – 5 receptions, 52 yards
- TB – Chris Godwin – 7 receptions, 103 yards

The Redskins improved to 6–3.

==== Week 11: vs. Houston Texans ====
Week Eleven: Houston Texans at Washington Redskins – Game summary

Quarter	1	2	3	4	Total
**Texans**	10	7	3	3	**23**
Redskins	0	7	7	7	**21**

at FedEx Field, Landover, Maryland

- Date: November 18
- Game time: 1:00 pm. EST
- Game weather: 48 °F (9 °C), cloudy
- Game attendance: 61,593
- Referee: Alex Kemp
- TV announcers (CBS): Greg Gumbel, Trent Green, Bruce Arians and Melanie Collins
- Recap, Gamebook

Game information

**First quarter**

- HOU – Kaʻimi Fairbairn 23-yard field goal, 9:34. Texans 3–0. **Drive: 10 plays, 68 yards, 4:36.**
- HOU – DeAndre Hopkins 16-yard pass from Deshaun Watson (Kaʻimi Fairbairn kick), 3:15. Texans 10–0. **Drive: 6 plays, 69 yards, 3:13.**

**Second quarter**

- WAS – Adrian Peterson 3-yard run (Dustin Hopkins kick), 14:14. Texans 10–7. **Drive: 10 plays, 75 yards, 4:01.**
- HOU – Justin Reid 101-yard interception return (Kaʻimi Fairbairn kick), 2:23. Texans 17–7.

**Third quarter**

- WAS – Jordan Reed 9-yard pass from Colt McCoy (Dustin Hopkins kick), 4:52. Texans 17–14. **Drive: 2 plays, 13 yards, 0:46.**
- HOU – Kaʻimi Fairbairn 33-yard field goal, 1:22. Texans 20–14. **Drive: 8 plays, 60 yards, 3:28.**

**Fourth quarter**

- WAS – Adrian Peterson 7-yard run (Dustin Hopkins kick), 11:57. Redskins 21–20. **Drive: 10 plays, 67 yards, 4:22.**
- HOU – Kaʻimi Fairbairn 54-yard field goal, 7:30. Texans 23–21. **Drive: 8 plays, 37 yards, 4:27.**

**Top passers**

- HOU – Deshaun Watson – 16/24, 208 yards, TD, 2 INT
- WAS – Alex Smith – 12/27, 135 yards, 2 INT

**Top rushers**

- HOU – Lamar Miller – 20 carries, 86 yards
- WAS – Adrian Peterson – 16 carries, 51 yards, 2 TD

**Top receivers**

- HOU – Keke Coutee – 5 receptions, 77 yards
- WAS – Jordan Reed – 7 receptions, 71 yards, TD

During a play in the third quarter of the game, starter Alex Smith suffered a life-threatening injury to his right leg after being sacked by J. J. Watt and Kareem Jackson. He was replaced by his backup, Colt McCoy. Coincidentally, this was exactly 33 years to the day of Joe Theismann's career-ending leg injury. Joe Theismann was also present during the game and witnessed the injury. The Redskins fell to 6–4 by losing 23–21, which ironically was the same score in the game where Theismann was injured. Alex Smith would not play again until Week 5 in 2020 against the Rams.

==== Week 12: at Dallas Cowboys ====
NFL on Thanksgiving Day

Week Twelve: Washington Redskins at Dallas Cowboys – Game summary

Quarter	1	2	3	4	Total
Redskins	0	7	6	10	**23**
**Cowboys**	7	3	14	7	**31**

at AT&T Stadium, Arlington, Texas

- Date: November 22
- Game time: 4:30 pm. EST/3:30 pm. CST
- Game weather: Played indoors (retractable roof closed)
- Game attendance: 92,076
- Referee: Ronald Torbert
- TV announcers (Fox): Joe Buck, Troy Aikman, Erin Andrews and Kristina Pink
- Recap, Gamebook

Game information

**First quarter**

- DAL – Ezekiel Elliott 16-yard rush (Brett Maher kick), 10:02. Cowboys 7–0. **Drive: 10 plays, 75 yards, 4:58.**

**Second quarter**

- WAS – Vernon Davis 53-yard pass from Colt McCoy (Dustin Hopkins kick), 7:04. Tied 7–7. **Drive: 1 play, 53 yards, 0:08.**
- DAL – Brett Maher 28-yard field goal, 1:28. Cowboys 10–7. **Drive: 14 plays, 65 yards, 5:36.**

**Third quarter**

- WAS – Trey Quinn 10-yard pass from Colt McCoy (kick failed), 9:02. Redskins 13–10. **Drive: 3 plays, 25 yards, 1:29.**
- DAL – Amari Cooper 40-yard pass from Dak Prescott (Brett Maher kick), 6:47. Cowboys 17–13. **Drive: 6 plays, 75 yards, 2:15.**
- DAL – Amari Cooper 90-yard pass from Dak Prescott (Brett Maher kick), 2:10. Cowboys 24–13. **Drive: 2 plays, 91 yards, 0:55.**

**Fourth quarter**

- DAL – Dak Prescott 5-yard rush (Brett Maher kick), 14:11. Cowboys 31–13. **Drive: 5 plays, 17 yards, 2:20.**
- WAS – Kapri Bibbs 1-yard rush (Dustin Hopkins kick), 11:43. Cowboys 31–20. **Drive: 6 plays, 44 yards, 2:28.**
- WAS – Dustin Hopkins 31-yard field goal, 1:13. Cowboys 31–23. **Drive: 11 plays, 41 yards, 2:37.**

**Top passers**

- WAS – Colt McCoy – 24/38, 268 yards, 2 TD, 3 INT
- DAL – Dak Prescott – 22/31, 289 yards, 2 TD

**Top rushers**

- WAS – Adrian Peterson – 12 carries, 35 yards
- DAL – Ezekiel Elliott – 26 carries, 121 yards, TD

**Top receivers**

- WAS – Jordan Reed – 6 receptions, 75 yards
- DAL – Amari Cooper – 8 receptions, 180 yards, 2 TD

In their first game without Alex Smith, the Redskins would have an early lead, but would struggle immediately afterwards. The loss dropped the Redskins to 6–5. This was Washington's final Thanksgiving appearance as the Redskins.

==== Week 13: at Philadelphia Eagles ====
Week Thirteen: Washington Redskins at Philadelphia Eagles – Game summary

Quarter	1	2	3	4	Total
Redskins	0	13	0	0	**13**
**Eagles**	7	7	0	14	**28**

at Lincoln Financial Field, Philadelphia, Pennsylvania

- Date: December 3
- Game time: 8:15 pm. EST
- Game weather: 36 °F (2 °C), cloudy
- Game attendance: 69,696
- Referee: Tony Corrente
- TV announcers (ESPN): Joe Tessitore, Jason Witten, Booger McFarland and Lisa Salters
- Recap, Gamebook

Game information

**First quarter**

- PHI – Golden Tate 6-yard pass from Carson Wentz (Jake Elliott kick), 7:31. Eagles 7–0. **Drive: 12 plays, 80 yards, 7:29.**

**Second quarter**

- WAS – Dustin Hopkins 44-yard field goal, 13:46. Eagles 7–3. **Drive: 8 plays, 42 yards, 4:58.**
- WAS – Adrian Peterson 90-yard rush (Dustin Hopkins kick), 9:23. Redskins 10–7. **Drive: 1 plays, 90 yards, 0:13.**
- PHI – Darren Sproles 14-yard rush (Jake Elliott kick), 1:46. Eagles 14–10. **Drive: 3 plays, 26 yards, 0:35.**
- WAS – Dustin Hopkins 47-yard field goal, 0:15. Eagles 14–13. **Drive: 9 plays, 46 yards, 1:31.**

**Third quarter**

- No scoring plays.

**Fourth quarter**

- PHI – Jordan Matthews 4-yard pass from Carson Wentz (Carson Wentz-Golden Tate pass), 14:10. Eagles 22–13. **Drive: 11 plays, 85 yards, 5:41.**
- PHI – Jake Elliott 46-yard field goal, 11:41. Eagles 25–13. **Drive: 4 plays, 7 yards, 0:56.**
- PHI – Jake Elliott 44-yard field goal, 4:48. Eagles 28–13. **Drive: 10 plays, 42 yards, 5:14.**

**Top passers**

- WAS – Mark Sanchez – 13/21, 100 yards, 1 INT
- PHI – Carson Wentz – 27/39, 306 yards, 2 TD, 1 INT

**Top rushers**

- WAS – Adrian Peterson – 9 carries, 98 yards, 1 TD
- PHI – Josh Adams – 20 carries, 85 yards

**Top receivers**

- WAS – Josh Doctson – 3 receptions, 51 yards
- PHI – Golden Tate – 7 receptions, 85 yards, 1 TD

Redskins fell to 6–6.

==== Week 14: vs. New York Giants ====
Week Fourteen: New York Giants at Washington Redskins – Game summary

Quarter	1	2	3	4	Total
**Giants**	7	27	6	0	**40**
Redskins	0	0	0	16	**16**

at FedEx Field, Landover, Maryland

- Date: December 9
- Game time: 1:00 pm. EST
- Game weather: 33 °F (1 °C), cloudy
- Game attendance: 57,437
- Referee: Carl Cheffers
- TV announcers (Fox): Chris Myers, Daryl Johnston and Laura Okmin
- Recap, Gamebook

Game information

**First quarter**

- NYG – Curtis Riley 9-yard interception return (Aldrick Rosas kick), 2:45. Giants 7–0.

**Second quarter**

- NYG – Aldrick Rosas 35-yard field goal, 10:38. Giants 10–0. **Drive: 9 plays, 43 yards, 4:29.**
- NYG – Saquon Barkley 78-yard rush (Aldrick Rosas kick), 8:42. Giants 17–0. **Drive: 1 plays, 78 yards, 0:12.**
- NYG – Sterling Shepard 3-yard pass from Eli Manning (Aldrick Rosas kick), 6:21. Giants 24–0. **Drive: 3 plays, 10 yards, 1:21.**
- NYG – Bennie Fowler III 6-yard pass from Eli Manning (Aldrick Rosas kick), 1:48. Giants 31–0. **Drive: 6 plays, 82 yards, 2:32.**
- NYG – Aldrick Rosas 23-yard field goal, 0:00. Giants 34–0. **Drive: 6 plays, 53 yards, 0:56.**

**Third quarter**

- NYG – Russell Shepard 11-yard pass from Eli Manning (kick failed), 5:38. Giants 40–0. **Drive: 9 plays, 81 yards, 5:40.**

**Fourth quarter**

- WAS – Josh Johnson 8-yard rush (Josh Johnson-Vernon Davis pass), 11:56. Giants 40–8. **Drive: 5 plays, 33 yards, 2:05.**
- WAS – Jamison Crowder 79-yard pass from Josh Johnson (Josh Johnson-Michael Floyd pass), 8:48. Giants 40–16. **Drive: 2 plays, 77 yards, 1:35.**

**Top passers**

- NYG – Eli Manning – 14/22, 197 yards, 3 TD
- WAS – Josh Johnson – 11/16, 195 yards, 1 TD, 1 INT

**Top rushers**

- NYG – Saquon Barkley – 14 carries, 170 yards, 1 TD
- WAS – Josh Johnson – 7 carries, 45 yards, 1 TD

**Top receivers**

- NYG – Evan Engram – 3 receptions, 77 yards
- WAS – Jamison Crowder – 2 receptions, 87 yards, 1 TD

The Redskins fell down to 6–7.

==== Week 15: at Jacksonville Jaguars ====
Week Fifteen: Washington Redskins at Jacksonville Jaguars – Game summary

Quarter	1	2	3	4	Total
**Redskins**	3	0	3	10	**16**
Jaguars	0	10	0	3	**13**

at TIAA Bank Field, Jacksonville, Florida

- Date: December 16
- Game time: 1:00 pm. EST
- Game weather: 64 °F (18 °C), partly cloudy
- Game attendance: 67,577
- Referee: Clete Blakeman
- TV announcers (CBS): Kevin Harlan, Rich Gannon and Steve Tasker
- Recap, Gamebook

Game information

**First quarter**

- WAS – Dustin Hopkins 46-yard field goal, 1:50. Redskins 3–0. **Drive: 9 plays, 38 yards, 5:02.**

**Second quarter**

- JAX – Kai Forbath 33-yard field goal, 3:22. Tied 3–3. **Drive: 10 plays, 36 yards, 5:20.**
- JAX – Dede Westbrook 74-yard punt return (Kai Forbath kick), 0:04. Jaguars 10–3.

**Third quarter**

- WAS – Dustin Hopkins 33-yard field goal, 7:32. Jaguars 10–6. **Drive: 16 plays, 40 yards, 7:28.**

**Fourth quarter**

- JAX – Kai Forbath 41-yard field goal, 11:16. Jaguars 13–6. **Drive: 9 plays, 70 yards, 5:28.**
- WAS – Jeremy Sprinkle 6-yard pass from Josh Johnson (Dustin Hopkins kick), 5:47. Tied 13–13. **Drive: 10 plays, 69 yards, 5:29.**
- WAS – Dustin Hopkins 36-yard field goal, 0:00. Redskins 16–13. **Drive: 8 plays, 36 yards, 2:31.**

**Top passers**

- WAS – Josh Johnson – 16/25, 151 yards, TD
- JAX – Cody Kessler – 9/17, 57 yards, INT

**Top rushers**

- WAS – Adrian Peterson – 19 carries, 51 yards
- JAX – Cody Kessler – 6 carries, 68 yards

**Top receivers**

- WAS – Jamison Crowder – 4 receptions, 46 yards
- JAX – Dede Westbrook – 3 receptions, 21 yards

The Redskins improved to 7–7. The Redskins would then eclipse 600 regular season wins in franchise, the fifth team to do so (with Bears, Packers, Giants, & Steelers) with a regular season record of 600-588-28 at that point.

==== Week 16: at Tennessee Titans ====
Week Sixteen: Washington Redskins at Tennessee Titans – Game summary

Quarter	1	2	3	4	Total
Redskins	3	7	3	3	**16**
**Titans**	6	3	0	16	**25**

at Nissan Stadium, Nashville, Tennessee

- Date: December 22
- Game time: 4:30 pm. EST/3:30 pm. CST
- Game weather: 51 °F (11 °C), sunny
- Game attendance: 60,746
- Referee: John Hussey
- TV announcers (NFLN): Curt Menefee, Steve Mariucci and Nate Burleson
- Recap, Gamebook

Game information

**First quarter**

- WAS – Dustin Hopkins 50-yard field goal, 12:14. Redskins 3–0. **Drive: 7 plays, 40 yards, 2:51.**
- TEN – Derrick Henry 1-yard run (kick failed), 5:41. Titans 6–3. **Drive: 11 plays, 69 yards, 6:32.**

**Second quarter**

- WAS – Michael Floyd 7-yard pass from Josh Johnson (Dustin Hopkins kick), 4:34. Redskins 10–6. **Drive: 17 plays, 93 yards, 10:58.**
- TEN – Ryan Succop 42-yard field goal, 0:01. Redskins 10–9. **Drive: 13 plays, 51 yards, 4:28.**

**Third quarter**

- WAS – Dustin Hopkins 40-yard field goal, 5:01. Redskins 13–9. **Drive: 11 plays, 64 yards, 5:18.**

**Fourth quarter**

- TEN – Ryan Succop 33-yard field goal, 15:00. Redskins 13–12. **Drive: 10 plays, 60 yards, 5:02.**
- WAS – Dustin Hopkins 46-yard field goal, 8:14. Redskins 16–12. **Drive: 12 plays, 47 yards, 6:46.**
- TEN – MyCole Pruitt 2-yard pass from Blaine Gabbert (Ryan Succop kick), 4:35. Titans 19–16. **Drive: 7 plays, 75 yards, 3:39.**
- TEN – Malcolm Butler 56-yard interception return, 0:00. Titans 25–16.

**Top passers**

- WAS – Josh Johnson – 13/23, 153 yards, TD, 2 INT
- TEN – Marcus Mariota – 10/13, 110 yards

**Top rushers**

- WAS – Adrian Peterson – 26 rushes, 119 yards
- TEN – Derrick Henry – 21 rushes, 84 yards, TD

**Top receivers**

- WAS – Jamison Crowder – 5 receptions, 78 yards
- TEN – Taywan Taylor – 3 receptions, 64 yards

This loss dropped the Redskins to 7–8. Also with this loss, plus wins by the Vikings and Seahawks, the Redskins were eliminated from playoff contention.

==== Week 17: vs. Philadelphia Eagles ====
Week Seventeen: Philadelphia Eagles at Washington Redskins – Game summary

Quarter	1	2	3	4	Total
**Eagles**	3	7	7	7	**24**
Redskins	0	0	0	0	**0**

at FedEx Field, Landover, Maryland

- Date: December 30
- Game time: 4:25 pm. EST
- Game weather: 46 °F (8 °C), sunny
- Game attendance: 63,188
- Referee: Craig Wrolstad
- TV announcers (Fox): Chris Myers, Daryl Johnston and Laura Okmin
- Recap, Gamebook

Game information

**First quarter**

- PHI – Jake Elliott 33-yard field goal, 0:22. Eagles 3–0. **Drive: 11 plays, 64 yards, 6:20.**

**Second quarter**

- PHI – Alshon Jeffery 2-yard pass from Nick Foles (Jake Elliott kick), 0:30. Eagles 10–0. **Drive: 19 plays, 87 yards, 11:49.**

**Third quarter**

- PHI – Nelson Agholor 6-yard pass from Nick Foles (Jake Elliott kick), 1:25. Eagles 17–0. **Drive: 13 plays, 68 yards, 7:23.**

**Fourth quarter**

- PHI – Nelson Agholor 22-yard pass from Nate Sudfeld (Jake Elliott kick), 7:34. Eagles 24–0. **Drive: 5 plays, 46 yards, 3:56.**

**Top passers**

- PHI – Nick Foles – 28/33, 221 yards, 2 TD, 1 INT
- WAS – Josh Johnson – 12/27, 91 yards, 1 INT

**Top rushers**

- PHI – Wendell Smallwood – 12 carries, 53 yards
- WAS – Chris Thompson – 2 carries, 10 yards

**Top receivers**

- PHI – Alshon Jeffery – 5 receptions, 59 yards, 1 TD
- WAS – Josh Doctson – 2 receptions, 33 yards

The Redskins finished 7–9 despite having started 6–3, missing the playoffs for the second year in a row.

=== Standings ===
==== Division ====
NFC East
	W	L	T	PCT	DIV	CONF	PF	PA	STK
^{(4)} Dallas Cowboys	10	6	0	.625	5–1	9–3	339	324	W2
^{(6)} Philadelphia Eagles	9	7	0	.563	4–2	6–6	367	348	W3
Washington Redskins	7	9	0	.438	2–4	6–6	281	359	L2
New York Giants	5	11	0	.313	1–5	4–8	369	412	L3

==== Conference ====
NFC
#	Team	Division	W	L	T	PCT	DIV	CONF	SOS	SOV	STK
**Division leaders**
1 (Note: New Orleans finished ahead of LA Rams based on head-to-head victory, claiming the No. 1 seed.)	New Orleans Saints	South	13	3	0	.813	4–2	9–3	.482	.488	L1
2	Los Angeles Rams	West	13	3	0	.813	6–0	9–3	.480	.428	W2
3	Chicago Bears	North	12	4	0	.750	5–1	10–2	.430	.419	W4
4	Dallas Cowboys	East	10	6	0	.625	5–1	9–3	.488	.444	W2
**Wild Cards**
5	Seattle Seahawks	West	10	6	0	.625	3–3	8–4	.484	.400	W2
6	Philadelphia Eagles	East	9	7	0	.563	4–2	6–6	.518	.486	W3
**Did not qualify for the postseason**
7	Minnesota Vikings	North	8	7	1	.531	3–2–1	6–5–1	.504	.355	L1
8 (Note: Atlanta finished ahead of Washington based on head-to-head victory. Atlanta finished ahead of Carolina based on head-to-head sweep. Washington finished ahead of Carolina based on head-to-head victory.)	Atlanta Falcons	South	7	9	0	.438	4–2	7–5	.482	.348	W3
9	Washington Redskins	East	7	9	0	.438	2–4	6–6	.486	.371	L2
10	Carolina Panthers	South	7	9	0	.438	2–4	5–7	.508	.518	W1
11	Green Bay Packers	North	6	9	1	.406	1–4–1	3–8–1	.488	.417	L1
12	Detroit Lions	North	6	10	0	.375	2–4	4–8	.504	.427	W1
13 (Note: NY Giants finished ahead of Tampa Bay based on head-to-head victory.)	New York Giants	East	5	11	0	.313	1–5	4–8	.527	.487	L3
14	Tampa Bay Buccaneers	South	5	11	0	.313	2–4	4–8	.523	.506	L4
15	San Francisco 49ers	West	4	12	0	.250	1–5	2–10	.504	.406	L2
16	Arizona Cardinals	West	3	13	0	.188	2–4	3–9	.527	.302	L4
**Tiebreakers** (Note: When breaking ties for three or more teams under the NFL's rules, they are first broken within divisions, then comparing only the highest-ranked remaining team from each division.)
