= 2017 Washington Redskins season =

Washington Redskins' 86th season in the National Football League

- Owner: Daniel Snyder
- President: Bruce Allen
- Head coach: Jay Gruden
- Offensive coordinator: Matt Cavanaugh
- Defensive coordinator: Greg Manusky
- Home stadium: FedExField

Results
- Record: 7–9
- Division place: 3rd NFC East
- Playoffs: Did not qualify
- Pro Bowlers: OLB Ryan Kerrigan; OT Trent Williams; G Brandon Scherff

Uniform
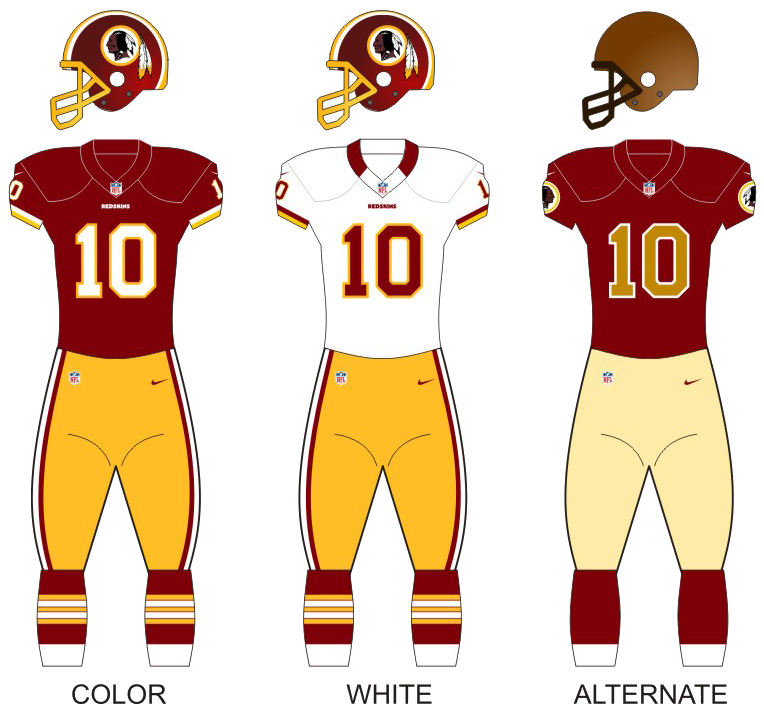

The 2017 season was the Washington Redskins' 86th in the National Football League (NFL) and the fourth under head coach Jay Gruden. The Redskins ended the season losing eight of the final 13 games after a 2–1 start, failing to improve on their 8–7–1 record from the previous season, and were mathematically eliminated from playoff contention with a loss to the Chargers. The team experienced an abundance of injuries at key positions, but ended the season tied for only the 26th most difficult schedule.

In Week 2, the Redskins played the Rams in Los Angeles for the first time in 23 years. In addition, this was the last of six seasons that quarterback Kirk Cousins was on the roster, as he would join the Minnesota Vikings in the following offseason.

== Offseason ==
=== Organizational changes ===
On January 6, the Redskins fired defensive coordinator Joe Barry, secondary coach Perry Fewell, defensive line coach Robb Akey, and strength and conditioning coach Mike Clark. General manager Scot McCloughan was fired on March 9.

=== 2017 NFL draft ===
==== Draft ====
2017 Washington Redskins draft
Round	Selection	Player	Position	College
1	17	Jonathan Allen	DE	Alabama
2	49	Ryan Anderson	LB	Alabama
3	81	Fabian Moreau	CB	UCLA
4	114	Samaje Perine	RB	Oklahoma
4	123	Montae Nicholson	S	Michigan State
5	154	Jeremy Sprinkle	TE	Arkansas
5	199	Chase Roullier	C	Wyoming
6	209	Robert Davis	WR	Georgia State
7	230	Josh Harvey-Clemons	S	Louisville
7	235	Joshua Holsey	CB	Auburn

Notes

- The Redskins swapped 1st round picks in 2016 with the Houston Texans and acquired a second 6th round pick (No. 209th overall) this year. The Redskins also traded their 4th round pick in 2016 to the New Orleans Saints and received a 5th round pick in 2016 and 5th round pick (No. 154th overall) this year. Lastly, the Redskins swapped their 5th round pick from 2016 for the 4th round pick (No. 114th overall) this year from the New York Jets.

== Staff ==
2017 Washington Redskins staff
Front office: Owner – Daniel Snyder; President – Bruce Allen; Senior Vice-president of Player Personnel – Doug Williams; Senior Vice-president of Football Administration – Eric Schaffer; Director of college scouting – Kyle Smith; Senior Personnel Executive – Scott Campbell; Director of pro personnel – Alex Santos; Director of football operations – Paul Kelly; Director of Player Development – Malcolm Blacken; Head coaches: Head coach – Jay Gruden; Assistant head coach/offensive line – Bill Callahan; Offensive coaches: Offensive coordinator – Matt Cavanaugh; Quarterbacks – Kevin O'Connell; Running backs – Randy Jordan; Wide receivers – Ike Hilliard; Tight ends – Wes Phillips; Assistant offensive line – Kevin Carberry; Offensive quality control – Chris O'Hara	Defensive coaches: Defensive coordinator – Greg Manusky; Defensive line – Jim Tomsula; Outside linebackers - Chad Grimm; Inside linebackers – Kirk Olivadotti; Defensive backs – Torrian Gray; Assistant defensive backs – James Rowe; Defensive quality control – Cannon Matthews; Special teams coaches: Special teams coordinator – Ben Kotwica; Assistant special teams – Bret Munsey; Strength and conditioning: Head strength and conditioning – Chad Englehart; Assistant strength and conditioning – Deuce Gruden; Assistant strength and conditioning – Kavan Latham; Assistant strength and conditioning/nutritionist – Jake Sankal; Head athletic trainer – Larry Hess

== Final roster ==
2017 Washington Redskins roster
Quarterbacks (QB): 8 Kirk Cousins; 12 Colt McCoy; Running backs (RB): 39 Kapri Bibbs; 48 Dare Ogunbowale; 32 Samaje Perine; Wide receivers (WR): 80 Jamison Crowder; 19 Robert Davis; 18 Josh Doctson; 14 Ryan Grant; 13 Maurice Harris; 83 Brian Quick; Tight ends (TE): 85 Vernon Davis; 82 Manasseh Garner; 84 Niles Paul; 87 Jeremy Sprinkle	Offensive linemen (OL): 66 Tony Bergstrom C; 68 Tyler Catalina G; 67 Kyle Kalis G; 60 Arie Kouandjio G; 76 Morgan Moses T; 79 Ty Nsekhe T/G; 74 Demetrius Rhaney C; 73 Chase Roullier C; 75 Brandon Scherff G; Defensive linemen (DL): 64 A. J. Francis DE; 90 Ziggy Hood NT; 98 Matt Ioannidis DE; 72 Anthony Lanier DE; 97 Terrell McClain DE; 92 Stacy McGee DE	Linebackers (LB): 52 Ryan Anderson OLB; 53 Zach Brown ILB; 58 Junior Galette OLB; 40 Josh Harvey-Clemons ILB; 91 Ryan Kerrigan OLB; 41 Otha Peters ILB; 45 Pete Robertson OLB; 94 Preston Smith OLB; 50 Martrell Spaight ILB; 56 Zach Vigil ILB; Defensive backs (DB): 26 Bashaud Breeland CB; 47 Quinton Dunbar CB; 22 Deshazor Everett SS; 29 Kendall Fuller CB; 23 DeAngelo Hall SS; 38 Joshua Holsey CB; 31 Fabian Moreau CB; 24 Josh Norman CB; 37 Fish Smithson FS; 36 D. J. Swearinger FS; Special teams (ST): 3 Dustin Hopkins K; 57 Nick Sundberg LS; 5 Tress Way P	Practice squad: 62 Alex Balducci G; 63 Tavaris Barnes DE; 30 Kenny Hilliard RB; 78 Cameron Jefferson T; 69 John Kling T; 59 Alex McCalister OLB; 70 Ondre Pipkins NT; 17 Keenan Reynolds WR; 48 Orion Stewart SS; Reserve: 95 Jonathan Allen DE (IR); -- Kevin Bowen T (IR); 55 Chris Carter OLB (IR); -- T. J. Clemmings T (IR); 51 Will Compton ILB (IR); 46 LeShun Daniels RB (IR); 54 Mason Foster ILB (IR); 96 Arthur Jones DE (IR); 20 Robert Kelley RB (IR); 77 Shawn Lauvao G (IR); 61 Spencer Long C (IR); 34 Byron Marshall RB (IR); 39 Keith Marshall RB (IR); 93 Trent Murphy OLB (IR); 35 Montae Nicholson SS (IR); 11 Terrelle Pryor WR (IR); 86 Jordan Reed TE (IR); 99 Phil Taylor NT (IR); 25 Chris Thompson RB (IR); 71 Trent Williams T (IR); Rookies in italics 53 active, 20 reserve, 9 practice squad

== Preseason ==
Week	Date	Opponent	Result	Record	Venue	Recap
1	August 10	at Baltimore Ravens	L 3–23	0–1	M&T Bank Stadium	Recap
2	August 19	Green Bay Packers	L 17–21	0–2	FedExField	Recap
3	August 27	Cincinnati Bengals	W 23–17	1–2	FedExField	Recap
4	August 31	at Tampa Bay Buccaneers	W 13–10	2–2	Raymond James Stadium	Recap

== Regular season ==
=== Schedule ===
Week	Date	Opponent	Result	Record	Venue	Recap
1	September 10	**Philadelphia Eagles**	**L** 17–30	0–1	FedExField	Recap
2	September 17	at Los Angeles Rams	**W** 27–20	1–1	Los Angeles Memorial Coliseum	Recap
3	September 24	Oakland Raiders	**W** 27–10	2–1	FedExField	Recap
4	October 2	at Kansas City Chiefs	**L** 20–29	2–2	Arrowhead Stadium	Recap
5	Bye					
6	October 15	San Francisco 49ers	**W** 26–24	3–2	FedExField	Recap
7	October 23	at **Philadelphia Eagles**	**L** 24–34	3–3	Lincoln Financial Field	Recap
8	October 29	**Dallas Cowboys**	**L** 19–33	3–4	FedExField	Recap
9	November 5	at Seattle Seahawks	**W** 17–14	4–4	CenturyLink Field	Recap
10	November 12	Minnesota Vikings	**L** 30–38	4–5	FedExField	Recap
11	November 19	at New Orleans Saints	**L** 31–34 (OT)	4–6	Mercedes-Benz Superdome	Recap
12	November 23	**New York Giants**	**W** 20–10	5–6	FedExField	Recap
13	November 30	at **Dallas Cowboys**	**L** 14–38	5–7	AT&T Stadium	Recap
14	December 10	at Los Angeles Chargers	**L** 13–30	5–8	StubHub Center	Recap
15	December 17	Arizona Cardinals	**W** 20–15	6–8	FedExField	Recap
16	December 24	Denver Broncos	**W** 27–11	7–8	FedExField	Recap
17	December 31	at **New York Giants**	**L** 10–18	7–9	MetLife Stadium	Recap

Note: Intra-division opponents are in bold text.

=== Game summaries ===
==== Week 1: vs. Philadelphia Eagles ====
Week One: Philadelphia Eagles at Washington Redskins – Game summary

Quarter	1	2	3	4	Total
**Eagles**	7	9	3	11	**30**
Redskins	0	14	3	0	**17**

at FedExField, Landover, Maryland

- Date: September 10
- Game time: 1:00 p.m. EDT
- Game weather: 67 °F (19 °C), sunny
- Game attendance: 78,685
- Referee: Brad Allen
- TV announcers (Fox): Kenny Albert, Ronde Barber and Kristina Pink
- Recap, Gamebook

Game information

**First quarter**

- PHI – Nelson Agholor 58-yard pass from Carson Wentz (Caleb Sturgis kick), 11:43. Eagles 7–0. **Drive: 3 plays, 56 yards, 1:07.**

**Second quarter**

- PHI – LeGarrette Blount 1-yard pass from Carson Wentz (kick failed), 13:28. Eagles 13–0. **Drive: 8 plays, 39 yards, 4:20.**
- WAS – Ryan Kerrigan 24-yard interception return (Dustin Hopkins kick), 8:39. Eagles 13–7. **Drive: 0 plays, 24 yards, 0:00.**
- WAS – Chris Thompson 29-yard pass from Kirk Cousins (Dustin Hopkins kick), 1:26. Redskins 14–13. **Drive: 8 plays, 69 yards, 2:39.**
- PHI – Caleb Sturgis 50-yard field goal, 0:04. Eagles 16–14. **Drive: 10 plays, 43 yards, 1:17.**

**Third quarter**

- PHI – Caleb Sturgis 42-yard field goal, 10:42. Eagles 19–14. **Drive: 9 plays, 51 yards, 4:22.**
- WAS – Dustin Hopkins 33-yard field goal, 2:11. Eagles 19–17. **Drive: 16 plays, 66 yards, 8:32.**

**Fourth quarter**

- PHI – Caleb Sturgis 37-yard field goal, 2:02. Eagles 22–17. **Drive: 6 plays, 33 yards, 3:47.**
- PHI – Fletcher Cox 20-yard fumble return, (Alshon Jeffery pass from Carson Wentz), 1:38. Eagles 30–17. **Drive: 0 plays, 20 yards, 0:00.**

**Top passers**

- PHI – Carson Wentz: 26/39, 307 yards, 2 TD, INT
- WAS – Kirk Cousins: 23/40, 240 yards, TD, INT

**Top rushers**

- PHI – LeGarrette Blount: 14 rushes, 46 yards
- WAS – Robert Kelley: 10 rushes, 30 yards

**Top receivers**

- PHI – Zach Ertz: 8 receptions, 93 yards
- WAS – Terrelle Pryor: 6 receptions, 66 yards

With the loss, the Redskins began the season 0–1, losing their fifth consecutive season opener. They also had their 5-game winning streak against the Eagles snapped.

==== Week 2: at Los Angeles Rams ====
Week Two: Washington Redskins at Los Angeles Rams – Game summary

Quarter	1	2	3	4	Total
**Redskins**	3	17	0	7	**27**
Rams	0	10	7	3	**20**

at Los Angeles Memorial Coliseum, Los Angeles, California

- Date: September 17
- Game time: 4:25 p.m. EDT/1:25 p.m. PDT
- Game weather: 76 °F (24 °C), cloudy
- Game attendance: 56,612
- Referee: Jerome Boger
- TV announcers (Fox): Thom Brennaman, Chris Spielman and Peter Schrager
- Recap, Gamebook

Game information

**First quarter**

- WAS – Dustin Hopkins 41-yard field goal, 4:43. Redskins 3–0. **Drive: 14 plays, 57 yards, 7:24.**

**Second quarter**

- WAS – Chris Thompson 7-yard run (Dustin Hopkins kick), 14:54. Redskins 10–0. **Drive: 6 plays, 65 yards, 3:18.**
- WAS – Dustin Hopkins 22-yard field goal, 12:06. Redskins 13–0. **Drive: 7 plays, 26 yards, 2:33.**
- LAR – Todd Gurley 1-yard run (Greg Zuerlein kick), 9:59. Redskins 13–7. **Drive: 4 plays, 75 yards, 2:07.**
- LAR – Greg Zuerlein 32-yard field goal, 3:03. Redskins 13–10. **Drive: 9 plays, 54 yards, 4:12.**
- WAS – Chris Thompson 61-yard run (Dustin Hopkins kick), 1:44. Redskins 20–10. **Drive: 4 plays, 17 yards, 1:19.**

**Third quarter**

- LAR – Todd Gurley 44-yard pass from Jared Goff (Greg Zuerlein kick), 8:43. Redskins 20–17. **Drive: 6 plays, 93 yards, 3:26.**

**Fourth quarter**

- LAR – Greg Zuerlein 40-yard field goal, 7:16. Tied 20–20. **Drive: 14 plays, 53 yards, 7:22.**
- WAS – Ryan Grant 11-yard pass from Kirk Cousins (Dustin Hopkins kick), 1:49. Redskins 27–20. **Drive: 10 plays, 70 yards, 5:27.**

**Top passers**

- WAS – Kirk Cousins – 18/27, 179 yards, TD
- LAR – Jared Goff – 14/24, 219 yards, TD, INT

**Top rushers**

- WAS – Robert Kelley – 12 rushes, 78 yards
- LAR – Todd Gurley – 16 rushes, 88 yards, TD

**Top receivers**

- WAS – Jordan Reed – 6 receptions, 48 yards
- LAR – Gerald Everett – 3 receptions, 95 yards

Thanks to a 220-yard day from the running game, Cousins's late touchdown pass to Ryan Grant and a late interception by Mason Foster, the Redskins started the season 1-1 for the first time since 2015.

==== Week 3: vs. Oakland Raiders ====
Week Three: Oakland Raiders at Washington Redskins – Game summary

Quarter	1	2	3	4	Total
Raiders	0	0	7	3	**10**
**Redskins**	7	7	7	6	**27**

at FedExField, Landover, Maryland

- Date: September 24
- Game time: 8:30 p.m. EDT
- Game weather: 76 °F (24 °C), clear
- Game attendance: 77,123
- Referee: Tony Corrente
- TV announcers (NBC): Al Michaels, Cris Collinsworth and Michele Tafoya
- Recap, Gamebook

Game information

**First quarter**

- WAS – Chris Thompson 22-yard pass from Kirk Cousins (Dustin Hopkins kick), 9:43. Redskins 7–0. **Drive: 8 plays, 67 yards, 4:29.**

**Second quarter**

- WAS – Vernon Davis 18-yard pass from Kirk Cousins (Dustin Hopkins kick), 3:48. Redskins 14–0. **Drive: 11 plays, 72 yards, 6:10.**

**Third quarter**

- WAS – Josh Doctson 52-yard pass from Kirk Cousins (Dustin Hopkins kick), 10:37. Redskins 21–0. **Drive: 7 plays, 75 yards, 4:23.**
- Oak – Jared Cook 21-yard pass from Derek Carr (Giorgio Tavecchio kick), 3:52. Redskins 21–7. **Drive: 2 plays, 18 yards, 0:47.**

**Fourth quarter**

- WAS – Dustin Hopkins 23-yard field goal, 14:58. Redskins 24–7. **Drive: 7 plays, 70 yards, 3:54.**
- OAK – Giorgio Tavecchio 22-yard field goal, 11:54. Redskins 24–10. **Drive: 4 plays, 8 yards, 0:22.**
- WAS – Dustin Hopkins 28-yard field goal, 6:02. Redskins 27–10. **Drive: 9 plays, 65 yards, 5:52.**

**Top passers**

- OAK – Derek Carr – 19/31, 118 yards, 1 TD, 2 INT
- WAS – Kirk Cousins 25/30, 365 yards, 3 TD

**Top rushers**

- OAK – Marshawn Lynch – 6 rushes, 18 yards
- WAS – Samaje Perine – 19 rushes, 49 yards

**Top receivers**

- OAK – DeAndré Washington – 5 receptions, 24 yards
- WAS – Chris Thompson – 6 receptions, 150 yards, 1 TD

==== Week 4: at Kansas City Chiefs ====
Week Four: Washington Redskins at Kansas City Chiefs – Game summary

Quarter	1	2	3	4	Total
Redskins	10	0	7	3	**20**
**Chiefs**	0	7	10	12	**29**

at Arrowhead Stadium, Kansas City, Missouri

- Date: October 2
- Game time: 8:30 p.m. EDT/7:30 p.m. CDT
- Game weather: 82 °F (28 °C), clear
- Game attendance: 74,587
- Referee: Walt Coleman
- TV announcers (ESPN): Sean McDonough, Jon Gruden and Lisa Salters
- Recap, Gamebook

Game information

**First quarter**

- WAS – Terrelle Pryor 44-yard pass from Kirk Cousins (Dustin Hopkins kick), 12:00. Redskins 7–0. **Drive: 6 plays, 75 yards, 3:08.**
- WAS – Dustin Hopkins 19-yard field goal, 2:50. Redskins 10–0. **Drive: 14 plays, 50 yards, 7:39.**

**Second quarter**

- KC – Travis Kelce 17-yard pass from Alex Smith (Harrison Butker kick), 2:00. Redskins 10–7. **Drive: 7 plays, 73 yards, 3:07.**

**Third quarter**

- KC – Alex Smith 1-yard run (Harrison Butker kick), 9:24. Chiefs 14–10. **Drive: 10 plays, 79 yards, 5:40.**
- WAS – Ryan Grant 3-yard pass from Kirk Cousins (Dustin Hopkins kick), 7:47. Redskins 17–14. **Drive: 3 plays, 75 yards, 1:38.**
- KC – Harrison Butker 26-yard field goal, 0:04. Tied 17–17. **Drive: 13 plays, 68 yards, 7:41.**

**Fourth quarter**

- KC – Harrison Butker 32-yard field goal, 4:55. Chiefs 20–17. **Drive: 14 plays, 66 yards, 8:10.**
- WAS – Dustin Hopkins 40-yard field goal, 0:50. Tied 20–20. **Drive: 10 plays, 53 yards, 4:04.**
- KC – Harrison Butker 43-yard field goal, 0:08. Chiefs 23–20. **Drive: 6 plays, 50 yards, 0:43.**
- KC – Justin Houston 13-yard fumble return (run failed), 0:04. Chiefs 29–20.

**Top passers**

- WAS – Kirk Cousins – 14/24, 220 yards, 2 TD
- KC – Alex Smith – 27/37, 293 yards, TD

**Top rushers**

- WAS – Kirk Cousins – 7 rushes, 38 yards
- KC – Kareem Hunt – 21 rushes, 101 yards

**Top receivers**

- WAS – Vernon Davis – 2 receptions, 89 yards
- KC – Travis Kelce – 7 receptions, 111 yards, TD

==== Week 6: vs. San Francisco 49ers ====
Week Six: San Francisco 49ers at Washington Redskins – Game summary

Quarter	1	2	3	4	Total
49ers	0	7	10	7	**24**
**Redskins**	7	10	0	9	**26**

at FedExField, Landover, Maryland

- Date: October 15
- Game time: 1:00 p.m. EDT
- Game weather: 68 °F (20 °C), cloudy
- Game attendance: 75,568
- Referee: John Parry
- TV announcers (Fox): Chris Myers, Daryl Johnston and Laura Okmin
- Recap, Gamebook

Game information

**First quarter**

- WAS – Josh Doctson 11-yard pass from Kirk Cousins (Dustin Hopkins kick), 10:14. Redskins 7–0. **Drive: 8 plays, 75 yards, 4:46.**

**Second quarter**

- WAS – Samaje Perine 3-yard pass from Kirk Cousins (Dustin Hopkins kick), 9:47. Redskins 14–0. **Drive: 10 plays, 64 yards, 5:46.**
- WAS – Dustin Hopkins 48-yard field goal, 1:51. Redskins 17–0. **Drive: 8 plays, 55 yards, 3:24.**
- SF – Carlos Hyde 1-yard run (Robbie Gould kick), 0:00. Redskins 17–7. **Drive: 11 plays, 75 yards, 1:51.**

**Third quarter**

- SF – Robbie Gould 52-yard field goal, 9:41. Redskins 17–10. **Drive: 12 plays, 42 yards, 5:19.**
- SF – Carlos Hyde 1-yard run (Robbie Gould kick), 3:01. Tied 17–17. **Drive: 1 plays, 1 yards, 0:05.**

**Fourth quarter**

- WAS – Dustin Hopkins 21-yard field goal, 10:34. Redskins 20–17. **Drive: 16 plays, 72 yards, 7:27.**
- WAS – Kirk Cousins 7-yard run (kick failed), 3:28. Redskins 26–17. **Drive: 9 plays, 84 yards, 4:54.**
- SF – Aldrick Robinson 45-yard pass from C. J. Beathard (Robbie Gould kick), 1:58. Redskins 26–24. **Drive: 6 plays, 75 yards, 1:30.**

**Top passers**

- SF – C. J. Beathard – 19/36, 245 yards, TD, INT
- WAS – Kirk Cousins – 25/37, 330 yards, 2 TD, INT

**Top rushers**

- SF – Carlos Hyde – 13 carries, 28 yards, 2 TD
- WAS – Chris Thompson – 16 carries, 33 yards

**Top receivers**

- SF – Pierre Garçon – 5 receptions, 55 yards
- WAS – Chris Thompson – 4 receptions, 105 yards

==== Week 7: at Philadelphia Eagles ====
Week Seven: Washington Redskins at Philadelphia Eagles – Game summary

Quarter	1	2	3	4	Total
Redskins	3	7	7	7	**24**
**Eagles**	0	17	7	10	**34**

at Lincoln Financial Field, Philadelphia, Pennsylvania

- Date: October 23
- Game time: 8:30 p.m. EDT
- Game weather: 70 °F (21 °C), cloudy
- Game attendance: 69,596
- Referee: Ed Hochuli
- TV announcers (ESPN): Sean McDonough, Jon Gruden and Lisa Salters
- Recap, Gamebook

Game information

**First quarter**

- WAS – Nick Rose 27-yard field goal, 11:18. Redskins 3–0. **Drive: 8 plays, 66 yards, 3:42.**

**Second quarter**

- PHI – Jake Elliott 50-yard field goal, 13:15. Tied 3–3. **Drive: 9 plays, 33 yards, 4:04.**
- WAS – Chris Thompson 7-yard pass from Kirk Cousins (Nick Rose kick), 9:14. Redskins 10–3. **Drive: 7 plays, 76 yards, 4:01.**
- PHI – Mack Hollins 64-yard pass from Carson Wentz (Jake Elliott kick), 3:19. Tied 10–10. **Drive: 7 plays, 80 yards, 3:01.**
- PHI – Zach Ertz 4-yard pass from Carson Wentz (Jake Elliott kick), 0:22. Eagles 17–10. **Drive: 6 plays, 70 yards, 1:30.**

**Third quarter**

- PHI – Corey Clement 9-yard pass from Carson Wentz (Jake Elliott kick), 9:43. Eagles 24–10. **Drive: 10 plays, 86 yards, 5:17.**
- WAS – Jordan Reed 5-yard pass from Kirk Cousins (Nick Rose kick), 0:44. Eagles 24–17. **Drive: 8 plays, 52 yards, 4:04.**

**Fourth quarter**

- PHI – Nelson Agholor 10-yard pass from Carson Wentz (Jake Elliott kick), 11:10. Eagles 31–17. **Drive: 9 plays, 75 yards, 4:34.**
- PHI – Jake Elliott 42-yard field goal, 6:19. Eagles 34–17. **Drive: 4 plays, 2 yards, 2:20.**
- WAS – Jordan Reed 12-yard pass from Kirk Cousins (Nick Rose kick), 3:16. Eagles 34–24. **Drive: 9 plays, 66 yards, 3:02.**

**Top passers**

- WAS – Kirk Cousins – 30/40, 303 yards, 3 TD, INT
- PHI – Carson Wentz – 17/25, 268 yards, 4 TD, INT

**Top rushers**

- WAS – Chris Thompson – 7 rushes, 38 yards
- PHI – Carson Wentz – 8 rushes, 63 yards

**Top receivers**

- WAS – Vernon Davis – 4 receptions, 67 yards
- PHI – Zach Ertz – 5 receptions, 89 yards, TD

With the loss, the Redskins fell 3-3 and were swept by the Philadelphia Eagles for the first time since 2013.

==== Week 8: vs. Dallas Cowboys ====
Week Eight: Dallas Cowboys at Washington Redskins – Game summary

Quarter	1	2	3	4	Total
**Cowboys**	7	7	9	10	**33**
Redskins	10	3	0	6	**19**

at FedExField, Landover, Maryland

- Date: October 29
- Game time: 4:25 p.m. EDT
- Game weather: 60 °F (16 °C), rain
- Game attendance: 78,428
- Referee: Walt Anderson
- TV announcers (Fox): Thom Brennaman, Troy Aikman and Erin Andrews
- Reca[, Gamebook

Game information

**First quarter**

- WAS - Nick Rose 38-yard field goal, 13:17. Redskins 3–0. **Drive: 4 plays, 9 yards, 1:39.**
- DAL - Ezekiel Elliott 13-yard run (Mike Nugent kick), 10:37. Cowboys 7–3. **Drive: 5 plays, 75 yards, 3:56.**
- WAS - Rob Kelley 1-yard run (Nick Rose kick), 6:39. Redskins 10–7. **Drive: 7 plays, 75 yards, 3:56.**

**Second quarter**

- WAS - Nick Rose 42-yard field goal, 10:09. Redskins 13–7. **Drive: 7 plays, 38 yards, 2:53.**
- DAL - Ezekiel Elliott 1-yard run (Mike Nugent kick), 2:24. Cowboys 14–13. **Drive: 2 plays, 2 yards, 0:39.**

**Third quarter**

- DAL - Mike Nugent 36-yard field goal, 8:44. Cowboys 17–13. **Drive 9 plays, 27 yards, 3:44.**
- DAL - Mike Nugent 48-yard field goal, 6:29. Cowboys 20–13. **Drive 4 plays, -4 yards, 2:08.**
- DAL - Mike Nugent 27-yard field goal, 0:42. Cowboys 23-13. **Drive 10 plays, 48 yards, 4:02.**

**Fourth quarter**

- DAL - Mike Nugent 37-yard field goal, 8:47. Cowboys 26–13. **Drive 9 plays, 44 yards, 4:53.**
- WAS - Josh Doctson 1-yard pass from Kirk Cousins (kick failed), 4:39. Cowboys 26–19. **Drive: 14 plays, 75 yards, 4:08.**
- DAL - Byron Jones 21-yard interception return (Mike Nugent kick), 0:30. Cowboys 33–19.

**Top passers**

- DAL – Dak Prescott – 14/22, 143 yards
- WAS – Kirk Cousins – 26/39, 263 yards, 1 TD, 1 INT

**Top rushers**

- DAL – Ezekiel Elliott – 33 rushes, 150 yards, 2 TD
- WAS – Rob Kelly – 8 rushes, 19 yards, TD

**Top receivers**

- DAL – Dez Bryant – 4 receptions, 39 yards
- WAS – Jamison Crowder – 9 receptions, 123 yards

==== Week 9: at Seattle Seahawks ====
Week Nine: Washington Redskins at Seattle Seahawks – Game summary

Quarter	1	2	3	4	Total
**Redskins**	0	7	3	7	**17**
Seahawks	2	0	0	12	**14**

at CenturyLink Field, Seattle, Washington

- Date: November 5
- Game time: 4:05 p.m. EST/1:05 p.m. PST
- Game weather: 36 °F (2 °C), rain
- Game attendance: 68,927
- Referee: Ronald Torbert
- TV announcers (Fox): Kevin Burkhardt, Charles Davis and Pam Oliver
- Recap, Gamebook

Game information

**First quarter**

- SEA – Kirk Cousins sacked by Bobby Wagner in the end zone for a safety, 6:48. Seahawks 2–0.

**Second quarter**

- WAS – Robert Kelley 1-yard run (Nick Rose kick), 2:52. Redskins 7–2. **Drive: 13 plays, 71 yards, 6:45.**

**Third quarter**

- WAS – Nick Rose 28-yard field goal, 10:19. Redskins 10–2. **Drive: 7 plays, 57 yards, 3:07.**

**Fourth quarter**

- SEA – Luke Willson 10-yard pass from Russell Wilson (pass failed), 11:48. Redskins 10–8. **Drive: 6 plays, 66 yards, 2:54.**
- SEA – Doug Baldwin 30-yard pass from Russell Wilson (pass failed), 1:34. Seahawks 14–10. **Drive: 5 plays, 71 yards, 0:48.**
- WAS – Robert Kelley 1-yard run (Nick Rose kick), 0:59. Redskins 17–14. **Drive: 4 plays, 70 yards, 0:35.**

**Top passers**

- WAS – Kirk Cousins – 21/31, 247 yards
- SEA – Russell Wilson – 24/45, 297 yards, 2 TD, 2 INT

**Top rushers**

- WAS – Chris Thompson – 4 rushes, 20 yards
- SEA – Russell Wilson – 10 rushes, 77 yards

**Top receivers**

- WAS – Vernon Davis – 6 receptions, 72 yards
- SEA – Doug Baldwin – 7 receptions, 108 yards, TD

==== Week 10: vs. Minnesota Vikings ====
Week Ten: Minnesota Vikings at Washington Redskins – Game summary

Quarter	1	2	3	4	Total
**Vikings**	7	21	7	3	**38**
Redskins	10	7	3	10	**30**

at FedExField, Landover, Maryland

- Date: November 12
- Game time: 1:00 p.m. EST
- Game weather: 44 °F (7 °C), cloudy
- Game attendance: 74,476
- Referee: Bill Vinovich
- TV announcers (Fox): Kevin Burkhardt, Charles Davis and Pam Oliver
- Recap, Gamebook

Game information

First quarter

- WAS – Maurice Harris 36-yard pass from Kirk Cousins (Nick Rose kick), 10:57. Redskins 7–0. **Drive: 7 plays, 75 yards, 4:03.**
- MIN – Latavius Murray 1-yard run (Kai Forbath kick), 8:18. Tied 7–7. **Drive: 5 plays, 75 yards, 2:39.**
- WAS – Nick Rose 28-yard field goal, 0:08. Redskins 10–7. **Drive: 10 plays, 52 yards, 4:33.**

Second quarter

- MIN – Stefon Diggs 3-yard pass from Case Keenum (Kai Forbath kick), 11:45. Vikings 14–10. **Drive: 9 plays, 75 yards, 3:23.**
- WAS – Kirk Cousins 1-yard run (Nick Rose kick), 4:37. Redskins 17–14. **Drive: 13 plays, 60 yards, 7:08.**
- MIN – Adam Thielen 7-yard pass from Case Keenum (Kai Forbath kick), 1:49. Vikings 21–17. **Drive: 6 plays, 71 yards, 2:48.**
- MIN – David Morgan II 1-yard pass from Case Keenum (Kai Forbath kick), 0:22. Vikings 28–17. **Drive: 3 plays, 23 yards, 1:16.**

Third quarter

- MIN – Jarius Wright 7-yard pass from Case Keenum (Kai Forbath kick), 12:22. Vikings 35–17. **Drive: 6 plays, 72 yards, 2:38.**
- WAS – Nick Rose 21-yard field goal, 8:24. Vikings 35–20. **Drive: 11 plays, 69 yards, 3:58.**

Fourth quarter

- WAS – Kirk Cousins 2-yard run (Nick Rose kick), 14:47. Vikings 35–27. **Drive: 2 plays, 2 yards, 0:06.**
- MIN – Kai Forbath 53-yard field goal, 7:45. Vikings 38–27. **Drive: 13 plays, 40 yards, 7:02.**
- WAS – Nick Rose 55-yard field goal, 1:14. Vikings 38–30. **Drive: 13 plays, 41 yards, 2:29.**

Top passers

- MIN – Case Keenum – 21/29, 304 yards, 4 TD
- WAS – Kirk Cousins – 26/45, 327 yards, TD

Top rushers

- MIN – Latavius Murray – 17 rushes, 68 yards, TD
- WAS – Samaje Perine – 9 rushes, 35 yards

Top receivers

- MIN – Adam Thielen – 8 receptions, 166 yards, TD
- WAS – Jamison Crowder – 4 receptions, 76 yards

==== Week 11: at New Orleans Saints ====
Week Eleven: Washington Redskins at New Orleans Saints – Game summary

Quarter	1	2	3	4	OT	Total
Redskins	10	7	7	7	0	**31**
**Saints**	10	3	0	18	3	**34**

at Mercedes-Benz Superdome, New Orleans, Louisiana

- Date: November 19
- Game time: 1:00 p.m. EST/12:00 p.m. CST
- Game weather: Played indoors (dome stadium)
- Game attendance: 73,138
- Referee: Walt Coleman
- TV announcers (Fox): Joe Buck, Troy Aikman and Erin Andrews
- Recap, Gamebook

Game information

**First quarter**

- WAS – Nick Rose 38-yard field goal, 11:40. Redskins 3–0. **Drive: 6 plays, 27 yards, 2:11.**
- NO – Wil Lutz 52-yard field goal, 5:30. Tied 3–3. **Drive: 11 plays, 48 yards, 6:10.**
- WAS – Chris Thompson 16-yard pass from Kirk Cousins (Nick Rose kick), 2:11. Redskins 10–3. **Drive: 7 plays, 75 yards, 3:19.**
- NO – Mark Ingram II 36-yard run (Wil Lutz kick), 0:35. Tied 10–10. **Drive: 4 plays, 80 yards, 1:36.**

**Second quarter**

- WAS – Samaje Perine 1-yard run (Nick Rose kick), 10:44. Redskins 17–10. **Drive: 9 plays, 75 yards, 4:51.**
- NO – Wil Lutz 29-yard field goal, 0:00. Redskins 17–13. **Drive: 10 plays, 69 yards, 1:39.**

**Third quarter**

- WAS – Ryan Grant 40-yard pass from Kirk Cousins (Nick Rose kick), 1:37. Redskins 24–13. **Drive: 12 plays, 94 yards, 5:44.**

**Fourth quarter**

- NO – Wil Lutz 42-yard field goal, 9:19. Redskins 24–16. **Drive: 5 plays, 27 yards, 2:02.**
- WAS – Jeremy Sprinkle 7-yard pass from Kirk Cousins (Nick Rose kick), 5:58. Redskins 31–16. **Drive: 6 plays, 75 yards, 3:21.**
- NO – Josh Hill 3-yard pass from Drew Brees (Wil Lutz kick), 2:53. Redskins 31–23. **Drive: 8 plays, 75 yards, 3:05.**
- NO – Alvin Kamara 18-yard pass from Drew Brees (Alvin Kamara run for two-point conversion), 1:05. Tied 31–31. **Drive: 5 plays, 19 yards, 1:05.**

Overtime

- NO – Wil Lutz 28-yard field goal, 7:25. Saints 34–31. **Drive: 3 plays, 51 yards, 1:29.**

**Top passers**

- WAS – Kirk Cousins – 22/32, 322 yards, 3 TD
- NO – Drew Brees – 29/41, 385 yards, 2 TD, INT

**Top rushers**

- WAS – Samaje Perine – 23 carries, 117 yards, TD
- NO – Mark Ingram II – 11 carries, 134 yards, TD

**Top receivers**

- WAS – Josh Doctson - 4 receptions, 81 yards
- NO – Coby Fleener – 5 receptions, 91 yards

The Redskins suffered a loss to the Saints after going up 31–16 with 5:58 remaining in the fourth quarter. In under three minutes Drew Brees and the Saints offense rallied back to tie the game 31–31 with 1:05 left in the fourth. In overtime, Saint's kicker Wil Lutz kicked the game-winning field goal from 28 yards away, handing the Redskins their most devastating loss of the season.

==== Week 12: vs. New York Giants ====
NFL on Thanksgiving Day

Week Twelve: New York Giants at Washington Redskins – Game summary

Quarter	1	2	3	4	Total
Giants	0	3	7	0	**10**
**Redskins**	0	3	7	10	**20**

at FedExField, Landover, Maryland

- Date: November 23
- Game time: 8:30 p.m. EST
- Game weather: 33 °F (1 °C), clear
- Game attendance: 73,210
- Referee: Terry McAulay
- TV announcers (NBC): Al Michaels, Cris Collinsworth and Michele Tafoya
- Recap, Gamebook

Game information

**First quarter**

- No scoring plays.

**Second quarter**

- NYG – Aldrick Rosas 30-yard field goal, 4:00. Giants 3–0. **Drive: 16 plays, 60 yards, 8:29.**
- WAS – Nick Rose 28-yard field goal, 0:13. Tied 3–3. **Drive: 4 plays, 38 yards, 0:51.**

**Third quarter**

- WAS – Jamison Crowder 15-yard pass from Kirk Cousins (Nick Rose kick), 6:32. Redskins 10–3. **Drive: 6 plays, 50 yards, 3:31.**
- NYG – Janoris Jenkins 53-yard interception return (Aldrick Rosas kick), 2:52. Tied 10–10.

**Fourth quarter**

- WAS – Josh Doctson 14-yard pass from Kirk Cousins (Nick Rose kick), 3:31. Redskins 17–10. **Drive: 8 plays, 60 yards, 5:02.**
- WAS – Nick Rose 33-yard field goal, 1:49. Redskins 20–10. **Drive: 4 plays, 4 yards, 0:23.**

**Top passers**

- NYG – Eli Manning – 13/27, 113 yards, INT
- WAS – Kirk Cousins – 19/31, 242 yards, 2 TD, INT

**Top rushers**

- NYG – Wayne Gallman – 9 carries, 37 yards
- WAS – Samaje Perine – 24 carries, 100 yards

**Top receivers**

- NYG – Roger Lewis – 3 receptions, 26 yards
- WAS – Jamison Crowder – 7 receptions, 141 yards, TD

The Redskins won on Thanksgiving Day for the first time since 2012 and their third time ever. Kirk Cousins threw a pick six to Janoris Jenkins, who suffered a season-ending injury on the play, to tie the game at 10. The Giants defense hung tough until Cousins and Josh Doctson broke through in the final minutes of the game.

This was Eli Manning's 210th consecutive and final start before being benched for Geno Smith for one game. He was the second quarterback ever to start 210 consecutive games, a record since passed by Philip Rivers.

==== Week 13: at Dallas Cowboys ====
Week Thirteen: Washington Redskins at Dallas Cowboys – Game summary

Quarter	1	2	3	4	Total
Redskins	0	7	0	7	**14**
**Cowboys**	0	17	0	21	**38**

at AT&T Stadium, Arlington, Texas

- Date: November 30
- Game time: 8:25 p.m. EST/7:25 p.m. CST
- Game weather: 58 °F (14 °C), clear — retractable roof open
- Game attendance: 91,712
- Referee: Craig Wrolstad
- TV announcers (NBC/NFLN/Amazon Video): Mike Tirico, Cris Collinsworth and Heather Cox
- Recap, Gamebook

Game information

**First quarter**

- No scoring plays.

**Second quarter**

- DAL – Jason Witten 8-yard pass from Dak Prescott (Dan Bailey kick), 10:43. Cowboys 7–0. **Drive: 11 plays, 59 yards, 6:09.**
- DAL – Dan Bailey 24-yard field goal, 5:29. Cowboys 10–0. **Drive: 7 plays, 13 yards, 4:14.**
- DAL – Ryan Switzer 83-yard punt return (Dan Bailey kick), 3:46. Cowboys 17–0.
- WAS – Ryan Grant 20-yard pass from Kirk Cousins (Nick Rose kick), 0:59. Cowboys 17–7. **Drive: 9 plays, 87 yards, 3:25.**

**Third quarter**

- No scoring plays.

**Fourth quarter**

- DAL – Dez Bryant 13-yard pass from Dak Prescott (Dan Bailey kick), 14:53. Cowboys 24–7. **Drive: 11 plays, 84 yards, 5:28.**
- WAS – Josh Doctson 14-yard pass from Kirk Cousins (Nick Rose kick), 11:28. Cowboys 24–14. **Drive: 9 plays, 87 yards, 3:25.**
- DAL – Alfred Morris 1-yard run (Dan Bailey kick), 4:55. Cowboys 31–14. **Drive: 10 plays, 75 yards, 6:33.**
- DAL – Rod Smith 1-yard run (Dan Bailey kick), 2:37. Cowboys 38–14. **Drive: 4 plays, 11 yards, 1:39.**

**Top passers**

- WAS – Kirk Cousins – 26/37, 251 yards, 2 TD, 2 INT
- DAL – Dak Prescott – 11/22, 102 yards, 2 TD

**Top rushers**

- WAS – Samaje Perine – 12 carries, 38 yards
- DAL – Alfred Morris – 27 carries, 127 yards, TD

**Top receivers**

- WAS – Ryan Grant – 5 receptions, 76 yards, TD
- DAL – Dez Bryant – 5 receptions, 61 yards, TD

==== Week 14: at Los Angeles Chargers ====
Week Fourteen: Washington Redskins at Los Angeles Chargers – Game summary

Quarter	1	2	3	4	Total
Redskins	0	6	0	7	**13**
**Chargers**	13	10	7	0	**30**

at StubHub Center, Carson, California

- Date: December 10
- Game time: 4:05 p.m. EST/1:05 p.m. PST
- Game weather: 81 °F (27 °C), partly cloudy
- Game attendance: 25,393
- Referee: Jeff Triplette
- TV announcers (CBS): Ian Eagle, Dan Fouts and Evan Washburn
- Recap, Gamebook

Game information

**First quarter**

- LAC – Travis Coons 33-yard field goal, 9:53. Chargers 3–0. **Drive: 10 plays, 60 yards, 5:07.**
- LAC – Hunter Henry 8-yard pass from Philip Rivers (Travis Coons kick), 2:34. Chargers 10–0. **Drive: 10 plays, 92 yards, 4:24.**
- LAC – Travis Coons 21-yard field goal, 0:03. Chargers 13–0. **Drive: 6 plays, 26 yards, 2:19.**

**Second quarter**

- WAS – Vernon Davis 23-yard pass from Kirk Cousins (kick failed), 10:13. Chargers 13–6. **Drive: 9 plays, 77 yards, 4:50.**
- LAC – Tyrell Williams 75-yard pass from Philip Rivers (Travis Coons kick), 10:02. Chargers 20–6. **Drive: 1 plays, 75 yards, 0:11.**
- LAC – Travis Coons 36-yard field goal, 2:23. Chargers 23–6. **Drive: 8 plays, 45 yards, 4:03.**

**Third quarter**

- LAC – Melvin Gordon 1-yard run (Travis Coons kick), 6:17. Chargers 30–6. **Drive: 3 plays, 55 yards, 1:29.**

**Fourth quarter**

- WAS – Bashaud Breeland 96-yard interception return (Nick Rose kick), 2:36. Chargers 30–13.

**Top passers**

- WAS – Kirk Cousins – 14/27, 151 yards, TD, INT
- LAC – Philip Rivers – 18/31, 319 yards, 2 TD

**Top rushers**

- WAS – Samaje Perine – 17 carries, 45 yards
- LAC – Melvin Gordon – 22 carries, 78 yards, TD

**Top receivers**

- WAS – Jamison Crowder – 3 receptions, 34 yards
- WAS – Josh Doctson – 3 receptions, 34 yards
- LAC – Tyrell Williams – 4 receptions, 132 yards, TD

With the loss, the Redskins were eliminated from playoff contention for the second consecutive season.

==== Week 15: vs. Arizona Cardinals ====
Week Fifteen: Arizona Cardinals at Washington Redskins – Game summary

Quarter	1	2	3	4	Total
Cardinals	3	6	3	3	**15**
**Redskins**	7	7	3	3	**20**

at FedExField, Landover, Maryland

- Date: December 17
- Game time: 1:00 p.m. EST
- Game weather: 50 °F (10 °C), cloudy
- Game attendance: 71,026
- Referee: Pete Morelli
- TV announcers (Fox): Kenny Albert, Ronde Barber and Kristina Pink
- Recap, Gamebook

Game information

**First quarter**

- WAS – Jamison Crowder 5-yard pass from Kirk Cousins (Dustin Hopkins kick), 13:30. Redskins 7–0. **Drive: 2 plays, 6 yards, 0:43.**
- ARI – Phil Dawson 40-yard field goal, 3:47. Redskins 7–3. **Drive: 16 plays, 60 yards, 9:43.**

**Second quarter**

- WAS – Kapri Bibbs 36-yard pass from Kirk Cousins (Dustin Hopkins kick), 13:27. Redskins 14–3. **Drive: 5 plays, 63 yards, 1:41.**
- ARI – Phil Dawson 35-yard field goal, 7:35. Redskins 14–6. **Drive: 11 plays, 57 yards, 5:52.**
- ARI – Phil Dawson 19-yard field goal, 0:00. Redskins 14–9. **Drive: 10 plays, 32 yards, 1:39.**

**Third quarter**

- ARI – Phil Dawson 34-yard field goal, 13:37. Redskins 14–12. **Drive: 4 plays, 6 yards, 1:23.**
- WAS – Dustin Hopkins 24-yard field goal, 4:23. Redskins 17–12. **Drive: 11 plays, 88 yards, 6:04.**

**Fourth quarter**

- ARI – Phil Dawson 32-yard field goal, 11:13. Redskins 17–15. **Drive: 9 plays, 47 yards, 3:37.**
- WAS – Dustin Hopkins 32-yard field goal, 4:30. Redskins 20–15. **Drive: 8 plays, 30 yards, 3:21.**

**Top passers**

- ARI – Blaine Gabbert – 16/41, 189 yards, INT
- WAS – Kirk Cousins – 18/26, 196 yards, 2 TD

**Top rushers**

- ARI – Kerwynn Williams – 17 carries, 61 yards
- WAS – Samaje Perine – 14 carries, 37 yards

**Top receivers**

- ARI – Larry Fitzgerald – 5 receptions, 60 yards
- WAS – Jamison Crowder – 5 receptions, 55 yards, TD

==== Week 16: vs. Denver Broncos ====
Week Sixteen: Denver Broncos at Washington Redskins – Game summary

Quarter	1	2	3	4	Total
Broncos	3	0	0	8	**11**
**Redskins**	0	10	3	14	**27**

at FedExField, Landover, Maryland

- Date: December 24
- Game time: 1:00 p.m. EST
- Game weather: 43 °F (6 °C), cloudy
- Game attendance: 72,889
- Referee: Ed Hochuli
- TV announcers (CBS): Spero Dedes and Adam Archuleta
- Recap, Gamebook

Game information

**First quarter**

- DEN – Brandon McManus 31-yard FG, 2:06. Broncos 3–0. **Drive: 10 plays, 33 yards, 5:55.**

**Second quarter**

- WAS – Dustin Hopkins 26-yard FG, 6:15. tied 3–3. **Drive: 11 plays, 83 yards, 5:17.**
- WAS – Jamison Crowder 15-yard pass from Kirk Cousins (Dustin Hopkins kick), 2:07. Redskins 10–3. **Drive: 5 plays, 38 yards, 2:26.**

**Third quarter**

- WAS – 3:30 Dustin Hopkins 29-yard FG, 3:30. Redskins 13–3. **Drive: 9 plays, 55 yards, 4:26.**

**Fourth quarter**

- WAS – Josh Doctson 48-yard pass from Kirk Cousins (Dustin Hopkins kick), 12:07. Redskins 20–3. **Drive: 5 plays, 77 yards, 2:41.**
- WAS – Vernon Davis 31-yard pass from Kirk Cousins (Dustin Hopkins kick), 4:21. Redskins 27–3. **Drive: 3 plays, 35 yards, 0:20.**
- DEN – C. J. Anderson 5-yard run (Brock Osweiler–C. J Anderson pass), 1:18. Redskins 27–11. **Drive: 11 plays, 75 yards, 3:03.**

**Top passers**

- DEN – Brock Osweiler – 22/38, 193 yards, INT
- WAS – Kirk Cousins – 19/37, 299 yards, 3 TD, INT

**Top rushers**

- DEN – C. J. Anderson – 16 rushes, 88 yards, TD
- WAS – Samaje Perine – 17 rushes, 53 yards

**Top receivers**

- DEN – Demaryius Thomas – 4 receptions, 52 yards
- WAS – Ryan Grant – receptions, 85 yards

==== Week 17: at New York Giants ====
Week Seventeen: Washington Redskins at New York Giants – Game summary

Quarter	1	2	3	4	Total
Redskins	7	3	0	0	**10**
**Giants**	15	0	0	3	**18**

at MetLife Stadium, East Rutherford, New Jersey

- Date: December 31
- Game time: 1:00 p.m. EST
- Game weather: 16 °F (−9 °C), partly cloudy
- Game attendance: 76,269
- Referee: John Hussey
- TV announcers (Fox): Sam Rosen, Matt Millen and Jennifer Hale
- Recap, Gamebook

Game information

**First quarter**

- NYG – Orleans Darkwa 75-yard run (kick blocked), 14:43. Giants 6–0. **Drive: 2 plays, 75 yards, 0:17.**
- NYG – Hunter Sharp 16-yard pass from Eli Manning (pass failed), 12:42. Giants 12–0. **Drive: 2 plays, 19 yards, 0:41.**
- WAS – Kirk Cousins 12-yard run (Dustin Hopkins kick), 7:55. Giants 12–7. **Drive: 2 plays, 20 yards, 0:45.**
- NYG – Aldrick Rosas 23-yard field goal, 4:49. Giants 15–7. **Drive: 9 plays, 70 yards, 3:06.**

**Second quarter**

- WAS – Dustin Hopkins 49-yard field goal, 0:00. Giants 15–10. **Drive: 1 plays, 0 yards, 0:04.**

**Third quarter**

- No scoring plays.

**Fourth quarter**

- NYG – Aldrick Rosas 29-yard field goal, 14:09. Giants 18–10. **Drive: 10 plays, 52 yards, 3:32.**

**Top passers**

- WAS – Kirk Cousins – 20/37, 158 yards, 3 INT
- NYG – Eli Manning – 10/28, 132 yards, TD, INT

**Top rushers**

- WAS – Kapri Bibbs – 12 carries, 47 yards
- NYG – Orleans Darkwa – 20 carries, 154 yards, TD

**Top receivers**

- WAS – Kapri Bibbs – 8 receptions, 53 yards
- NYG – Rhett Ellison – 5 receptions, 63 yards

=== Standings ===
==== Division ====
NFC East
	W	L	T	PCT	DIV	CONF	PF	PA	STK
^{(1)} Philadelphia Eagles	13	3	0	.813	5–1	10–2	457	295	L1
Dallas Cowboys	9	7	0	.563	5–1	7–5	354	332	W1
Washington Redskins	7	9	0	.438	1–5	5–7	342	388	L1
New York Giants	3	13	0	.188	1–5	1–11	246	388	W1

==== Conference ====
NFC
#	Team	Division	W	L	T	PCT	DIV	CONF	SOS	SOV	STK
**Division leaders**
1 (Note: Philadelphia claimed the No. 1 seed over Minnesota based on winning percentage vs. common opponents. Philadelphia's cumulative record against Carolina, Chicago, the Los Angeles Rams and Washington was 5–0, compared to Minnesota's 4–1 cumulative record against the same four teams.)	Philadelphia Eagles	East	13	3	0	.813	5–1	10–2	.461	.433	L1
2	Minnesota Vikings	North	13	3	0	.813	5–1	10–2	.492	.447	W3
3 (Note: LA Rams claimed the No. 3 seed over New Orleans based on head-to-head victory.)	Los Angeles Rams	West	11	5	0	.688	4–2	7–5	.504	.460	L1
4 (Note: New Orleans clinched the NFC South division over Carolina based on head-to-head sweep.)	New Orleans Saints	South	11	5	0	.688	4–2	8–4	.535	.483	L1
**Wild Cards**
5	Carolina Panthers	South	11	5	0	.688	3–3	7–5	.539	.500	L1
6	Atlanta Falcons	South	10	6	0	.625	4–2	9–3	.543	.475	W1
**Did not qualify for the postseason**
7 (Note: Detroit finished ahead of Dallas and Seattle based on conference record, while Seattle finished ahead of Dallas based on head-to-head victory.)	Detroit Lions	North	9	7	0	.563	5–1	8–4	.496	.368	W1
8	Seattle Seahawks	West	9	7	0	.563	4–2	7–5	.492	.444	L1
9	Dallas Cowboys	East	9	7	0	.563	5–1	7–5	.496	.438	W1
10	Arizona Cardinals	West	8	8	0	.500	3–3	5–7	.488	.406	W2
11 (Note: Green Bay finished ahead of Washington based on record vs. common opponents. Green Bay's cumulative record against Dallas, Minnesota, New Orleans and Seattle was 2–3, compared to Washington's 1–4 cumulative record against the same four teams.)	Green Bay Packers	North	7	9	0	.438	2–4	5–7	.539	.357	L3
12	Washington Redskins	East	7	9	0	.438	1–5	5–7	.539	.429	L1
13	San Francisco 49ers	West	6	10	0	.375	1–5	3–9	.512	.438	W5
14 (Note: Tampa Bay finished ahead of Chicago based on head-to-head victory.)	Tampa Bay Buccaneers	South	5	11	0	.313	1–5	3–9	.555	.375	W1
15	Chicago Bears	North	5	11	0	.313	0–6	1–11	.559	.500	L1
16	New York Giants	East	3	13	0	.188	1–5	1–11	.531	.458	W1
**Tiebreakers** (Note: When breaking ties for three or more teams under the NFL's rules, they are first broken within divisions, then comparing only the highest-ranked remaining team from each division.)
