= Greg Manusky =

American football coach (born 1966)

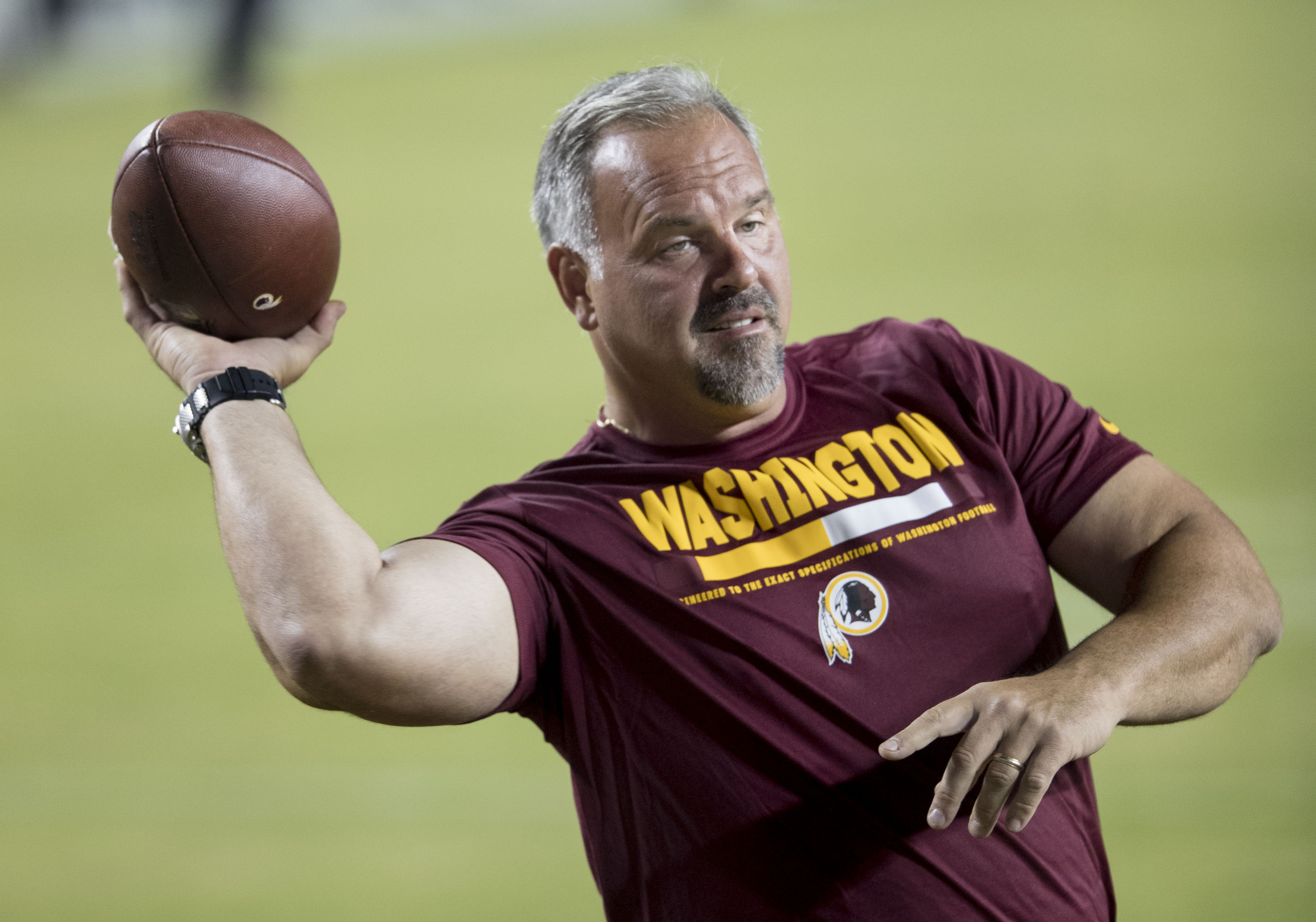
- Manusky with the Washington Redskins in 2017

Personal information
- Born: August 12, 1966 (age 60); Dallas, Pennsylvania, U.S.
- Listed height: 6 ft 1 in (1.85 m)
- Listed weight: 238 lb (108 kg)

Career information
- Position: Linebacker (No. 91, 51)
- High school: Dallas (Dallas, Pennsylvania)
- College: Colgate (1984–1987)
- NFL draft: 1988: undrafted

Career history

Playing
- Washington Redskins (1988–1990); Minnesota Vikings (1991–1993); Kansas City Chiefs (1994–1999)

Coaching
- Tampa Bay Buccaneers (2000) Training camp assistant; Washington Redskins (2001) Linebackers coach; San Diego Chargers (2002–2006) Linebackers coach; San Francisco 49ers (2007–2010) Defensive coordinator; San Diego Chargers (2011) Defensive coordinator; Indianapolis Colts (2012–2015) Defensive coordinator; Washington Redskins (2016) Outside linebackers coach; Washington Redskins (2017–2019) Defensive coordinator; Kentucky (2020–2021) Defensive quality control assistant; Minnesota Vikings (2022) Inside linebackers coach; Denver Broncos (2023–2024) Inside linebackers coach

Awards and highlights
- 2× first-team All-Patriot League (1986, 1987); Patriot League Defensive Player of the Year (1987); I-AA All-American (1987); All-Madden Team (1991); Patriot League 15th Anniversary Team (2001); Patriot League 25th Anniversary Team (2011)

Career NFL statistics
- Tackles: 237
- Forced fumbles: 1
- Fumble recoveries: 10
- Stats at Pro Football Reference
- Coaching profile at Pro Football Reference

Gregory Manusky (born August 12, 1966) is an American professional football coach and former linebacker. Manusky started his coaching career as a linebacker coach for two teams over six seasons. From there, he transitioned to a defensive coordinator for four teams over 12 seasons, totaling 19 seasons as a defensive coach. Prior to coaching, Manusky played as a linebacker in the National Football League (NFL) for three teams over 12 seasons.

== Early life and college career ==
Manusky played college football at Colgate University and high school football at Dallas High School.

== Professional career ==
Manusky signed with the Washington Redskins and remained with them from 1988 to 1990 under Joe Gibbs. After two seasons with the Washington Redskins, Manusky played with the Minnesota Vikings from 1991 to 1993 under Dennis Green. During his time with Minnesota, he was selected to the all-Madden Team in 1991. After two seasons with Minnesota, Manusky finished out his playing career with the Kansas City Chiefs from 1994 to 1999. After ending a 12-year playing career in 1999, Manusky entered the coaching ranks in the National Football League.

== Coaching career ==
=== Washington Redskins (first stint) ===
After 12 years of playing linebacker for three different teams, including the Washington Redskins, the Minnesota Vikings, and the Kansas City Chiefs, Manusky began his coaching career as a volunteer training camp assistant for the Tampa Bay Buccaneers in 2000, assisting his former Vikings defensive coordinator Tony Dungy with linebackers and special teams. His first full-time coaching position was in 2001, as he was hired as linebackers coach for the Washington Redskins under Marty Schottenheimer, who Manusky played for during his time on the Chiefs.

=== San Diego Chargers ===
Manusky followed Schottenheimer from Washington to the San Diego Chargers in 2002, as Schottenheimer, newly hired as the Chargers head coach, named Manusky linebackers coach. He remained in this position for five seasons. After the San Diego Chargers finished the 2006 season with a 14–2 record, Manusky accepted a defensive coordinator position with the San Francisco 49ers for the 2007 season.

=== San Francisco 49ers ===
Manusky spent four years as the San Francisco 49ers under 49ers head coach Mike Singletary. After the 2010 season, Singeltary was fired by the team. Former Stanford University head coach Jim Harbaugh replaced Singletary. Harbaugh gave Manusky permission to interview with other teams. Manusky ultimately accepted the defensive coordinator job with the Chargers, with whom he had previously worked as a linebackers coach.

=== San Diego Chargers ===
Manusky spent a year as a defensive coordinator for the San Diego Chargers. After an 8–8 season, the Chargers decided to part ways with Manusky. Subsequently, the Indianapolis Colts named him as their defensive coordinator for the 2012 season.

=== Indianapolis Colts ===
The Indianapolis Colts hired Manusky as their defensive coordinator on February 2, 2012. He spent four years under head coach Chuck Pagano. After four seasons, he was fired by the Colts on January 5, 2016.

=== Washington Redskins (second stint) ===
On January 22, 2016, Manusky was hired to be the outside linebackers coach for the Washington Redskins. A year later, the Redskins promoted him to defensive coordinator.

In the 2018 season, safety D. J. Swearinger publicly criticized Manusky and his play calling following the team's Week 16 loss to the Tennessee Titans. Despite being one of the better defensive players on the team that season, Swearinger was released the next day by head coach Jay Gruden for his comments against the Manusky.

Manusky left the team among staff turnover after the Redskins hired Ron Rivera as their new head coach following the 2019 season.

=== University of Kentucky ===
He then joined the University of Kentucky's football team to be one of their defensive quality control assistants in 2020.

=== Minnesota Vikings ===
On March 1, 2022, Manusky was hired as the inside linebackers coach for the Minnesota Vikings under new head coach Kevin O'Connell. On February 19, 2023, the Vikings fired him following the hiring of Brian Flores as their new defensive coordinator.

=== Denver Broncos ===
On February 25, 2023, the Denver Broncos announced the hiring of Manusky as their inside linebackers coach under new head coach Sean Payton. On January 28, 2025, Manusky and the Broncos mutually agreed to part ways.
