= Casey Dunn (American football) =

American football player (born 1994)

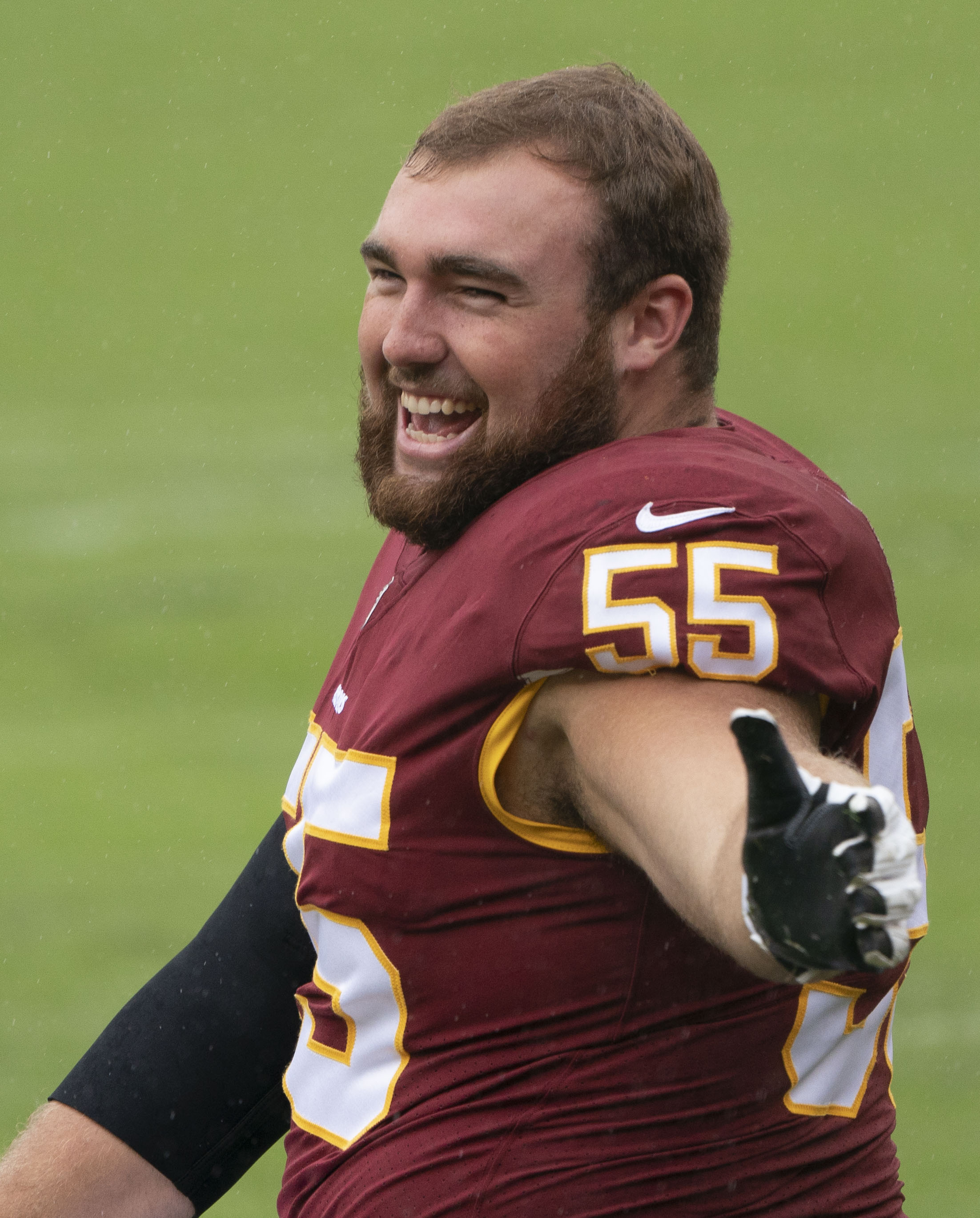
- Dunn with the Washington Redskins in 2018

No. 55, 57
- Position: Center

Personal information
- Born: October 11, 1994 (age 32); Trussville, Alabama, U.S.
- Listed height: 6 ft 3 in (1.91 m)
- Listed weight: 307 lb (139 kg)

Career information
- High school: Hewitt-Trussville
- College: Auburn
- NFL draft: 2018: undrafted

Career history
- Washington Redskins (2018–2019); New Orleans Saints (2019)*; Cleveland Browns (2020)*
- * Offseason or practice squad member only

Career NFL statistics
- Games played: 2
- Stats at Pro Football Reference

Casey Dunn (born October 11, 1994) is an American former professional football player who was a center in the National Football League (NFL). He played college football for the Auburn Tigers. He signed with the Washington Redskins as an undrafted free agent in 2018.

== College career ==
Dunn originally attended Jacksonville State University. After playing for JSU for three years and completing his junior year, he transferred to Auburn University in May 2017.

Dunn graduated JSU with a degree in industrial leadership. Upon transferring to Auburn, he entered the Masters program in community planning.

== Professional career ==
=== Washington Redskins ===
Unselected in the 2018 NFL draft, Dunn signed with the Washington Redskins after trying out at their rookie minicamp on May 2, 2018. After making the Redskins initial 53-man roster, Dunn played in two games before being waived on November 9, 2018, and was placed on their practice squad a few days later. He signed a reserve/future contract with the Redskins on December 31, 2018.

On July 31, 2019, Dunn was waived/injured by the Redskins and placed on injured reserve the next day. He was waived from injured reserve on September 24.

=== New Orleans Saints ===
On December 25, 2019, Dunn was signed to the New Orleans Saints practice squad. His practice squad contract with the team expired on January 13, 2020.

=== Cleveland Browns ===
On August 16, 2020, Dunn signed with the Cleveland Browns. He was waived with an injury designation on August 23, 2020, and subsequently reverted to the team's injured reserve list the next day. He was waived with an injury settlement on August 30, 2020.
