= James Rowe (American football) =

American football coach (born 1986)

South Florida Bulls
- Title: Defensive pass game coordinator & safeties coach

Personal information
- Born: February 11, 1986 (age 40); Cocoa, Florida, U.S.

Career information
- College: South Florida

Career history
- Cocoa HS (FL) (2007–2010) Offensive coordinator & quarterbacks coach; Bethel (TN) (2011) Graduate assistant; Jacksonville State (2012–2014); Graduate assistant (2012); Wide receivers coach (2013); Defensive coordinator (2014); Florida (2015) Defensive graduate assistant; Valdosta State (2016) Defensive coordinator; Washington Redskins (2017–2019) Assistant defensive backs coach; Appalachian State (2020) Cornerbacks coach; Indianapolis Colts (2021) Cornerbacks coach; Chicago Bears (2022) Defensive backs coach; South Florida (2023–present) Defensive pass game coordinator & safeties coach

James Willie Rowe III (born February 11, 1986) is an American football coach who is the defensive passing game coordinator and safeties coach for the University of South Florida. In 2021, he was the cornerbacks coach for the Indianapolis Colts. A 15-year coaching veteran, Rowe has four seasons of experience in the NFL. He was a three-year letterwinner (2005–07) as a baseball player at South Florida.

In 2022, Rowe was named the defensive backs coach of the East team for the East-West Shrine Bowl, the longest running college all-star football game in the nation.

== Playing career ==
Rowe played collegiate baseball (left-handed pitcher and outfielder) at South Florida and earned three letters from 2005 to 2007. He graduated with a degree in business administration in 2009.

In high school, Rowe was a four-year starter in football, basketball and baseball at Cocoa (Fla.) High School.

He earned numerous honors in high school, including:

Baseball

- First Team all-state (as a senior)
- Third Team all-state (as a sophomore and junior)
- All-Space Coast (as a sophomore, junior and senior)
- All-Central Florida (as a senior)

Football

- Third Team all-state (as a junior)
- All-Space Coast (as a junior)

== Coaching career ==
Cocoa (Fla.) High School (2007-2010)

A native of Cocoa, Fla., Rowe began his coaching career at his alma mater. He was the offensive coordinator/quarterbacks coach for four seasons.

Bethel (Tenn.) University (2011)

He was a graduate assistant for a Wildcats team that ranked 14th in the final NAIA poll.

Jacksonville University (2012–14)

Rowe served as defensive coordinator (2014), wide receivers coach (2013) and graduate assistant/cornerbacks coach (2012) for the Dolphins.

Florida (2015)

He spent the 2015 season at the University of Florida as a defensive graduate assistant. The Gators defense ranked sixth in total defense, eighth in scoring defense and 11th in pass defense.

Valdosta State (2016)

As defensive coordinator, Rowe helped the Blazers lead Division II with 27 interceptions. He coached current Colts cornerback Kenny Moore II to First Team All-America honors from the American Football Coaches Association.

At Valdosta State, Rowe coached under then Blazers Head Coach Kerwin Bell (current head coach at Western Carolina). Rowe previously served on Bell's staff at Jacksonville University for three years (2012–14).

Upon Rowe's hiring at Valdosta State, Bell was highly complimentary of Rowe as a coach and teacher.

“I’m very excited about having Coach Rowe join us as a defensive coordinator,” said Bell. “I had an opportunity to work with him at Jacksonville University, and I think he is a young superstar in this profession.”, said Kerwin Bell.

Bell noted that Rowe’s role involves maintaining communication with the team's players. His responsibilities include analyzing game situations to make tactical strategies and contributing to the long-term development of the program.

Washington Football Team (2017–19)

He spent three seasons in Washington as the team's assistant defensive backs coach.

Rowe coached cornerback Quinton Dunbar, who recorded his single-season career high in interceptions (four) in 2019.

In 2018, he assisted with a defensive back group that registered 15 interceptions (tied for ninth in the NFL).

In 2017, Washington ranked in the top-10 in opponent completion percentage (57.6 - third), passing yards allowed per game (213.8 - ninth) and opponent passer rating (81.0 - 10th). Washington's completion percentage was the team's best ranking since 2005.

Appalachian State (2020)

Rowe served as the team's cornerbacks coach. He was named one of 56 candidates for the Broyles Award, which honors college football's top assistant coaches. The Appalachian State defense led the country in passes defensed (74) and were the only team in the FBS to allow opponents to complete less than 50 percent of their passes.

Indianapolis Colts (2021)

In his first season in Indianapolis, Rowe assisted with a Colts defense that finished second in the league with 33 takeaways. The team tied for the league high in fumble recoveries (14) and tied for third in interceptions (19).

Rowe coached cornerback Kenny Moore II, whom he also coached at Valdosta State in 2016 while serving as the team's defensive coordinator. He helped Moore II become the first Colts cornerback named to the Pro Bowl since Vontae Davis in 2015. Indianapolis led the NFL with seven Pro Bowl players in 2021.

Moore II finished the 2021 season with 101 tackles (81 solo), 6.0 tackles for loss, 1.0 sack, 13 passes defensed, four interceptions, one forced fumble and one special teams stop. He was one of only two NFL defensive backs to register 100 tackles and at least 10 passes defensed in 2021.

Chicago Bears (2022)

Rowe was hired as the Bears' defensive backs coach on Feb. 4, 2022.

University of South Florida (Current)

On January 2, 2023, Rowe left the Bears to join the University of South Florida as their defensive passing game coordinator.

== Personal ==
Rowe is the son of James Rowe, Jr. and Louise Rowe. His brother, David, played football at Rutgers and is currently the cornerbacks coach at the University of Houston.

Rowe, Jr. played basketball at Florida Tech. He coached boys basketball at Cocoa (Fla.) High School for 24 years and won over 400 games upon his retirement in 2018. His 2009 boys varsity team won the state championship.
