= Chris O'Hara =

American football coach (born 1990)

Minnesota Vikings
- Title: Assistant offensive coordinator

Personal information
- Born: November 15, 1990 (age 35); Swoyersville, Pennsylvania, U.S.

Career information
- College: Miami (FL)

Career history
- Temple (2009–2010) Student assistant; Miami (FL) (2011–2013); Student assistant (2011-2012); Graduate assistant (2013); Jacksonville Jaguars (2014–2016) Offensive coaching associate; Washington Redskins (2017–2019) Offensive quality control coach; Jacksonville Jaguars (2020) Offensive assistant; Los Angeles Rams (2021) Offensive assistant; Minnesota Vikings (2022–present); Quarterbacks coach (2022-2023); Senior offensive assistant (2024-2025); Assistant offensive coordinator (2026-present)

Awards and highlights
- Super Bowl champion (LVI)

Chris O'Hara (born November 15, 1990) is an American football coach who is the Assistant offensive coordinator for the Minnesota Vikings.

== Coaching career ==
=== Early coaching career ===
O'Hara began his coaching career as a student assistant at Temple. He followed Al Golden to Miami in 2011 and worked as a student assistant there for two years. The next season he continued to work at Miami this time as a graduate assistant.

=== Jacksonville Jaguars (first stint) ===
O'Hara then made the jump to the NFL in 2014 becoming an offensive coaching associate for the Jacksonville Jaguars in 2014 where he stayed until 2016.

=== Washington Redskins ===
From 2017 until 2019 he worked as an offensive assistant for the Washington Redskins.

=== Jacksonville Jaguars (second stint) ===
In 2020 he worked as an offensive assistant for the Jaguars. He was fired after the 2020 season.

=== Los Angeles Rams ===
In 2021, he worked as an offensive assistant for the Los Angeles Rams where he won a Super Bowl.

=== Minnesota Vikings ===
In 2022 he became the quarterbacks coach for the Minnesota Vikings.
