= Joshua Holsey =

American football player (born 1994)

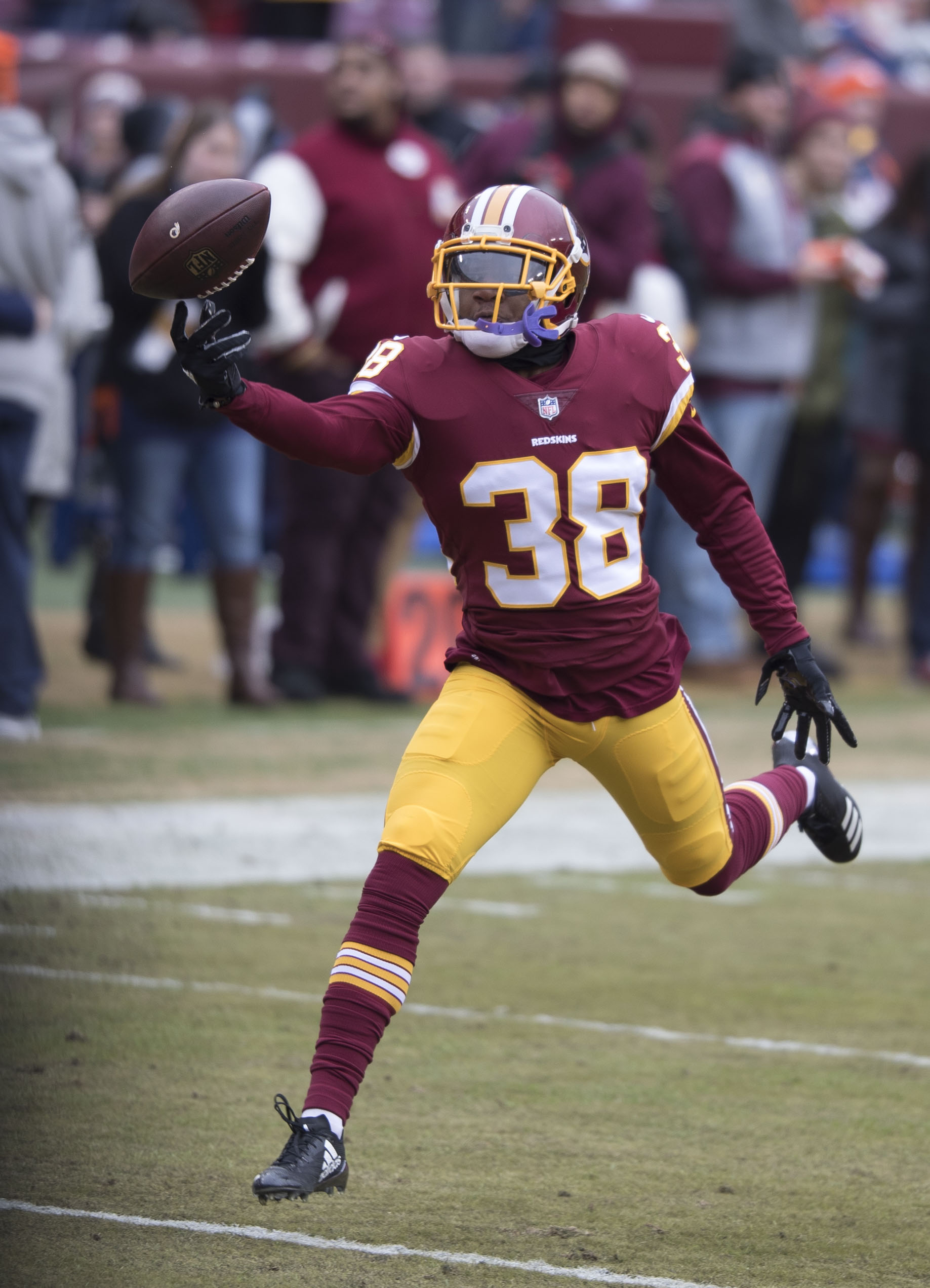
- Holsey with the Washington Redskins in 2017

No. 38
- Position: Cornerback

Personal information
- Born: June 25, 1994 (age 32); Fairburn, Georgia, U.S.
- Listed height: 5 ft 11 in (1.80 m)
- Listed weight: 195 lb (88 kg)

Career information
- High school: Creekside (Fairburn)
- College: Auburn
- NFL draft: 2017: 7th round, 235th overall pick

Career history
- Washington Redskins (2017–2018); Oakland Raiders (2019)*
- * Offseason or practice squad member only

Career NFL statistics
- Total tackles: 4
- Stats at Pro Football Reference

Joshua Holsey (born June 25, 1994) is an American former professional football player who was a cornerback in the National Football League (NFL). He played college football for the Auburn Tigers, and was selected by the Washington Redskins in the seventh round of the 2017 NFL draft.

== Professional career ==
Pre-draft measurables
Height	Weight	Arm length	Hand span	40-yard dash	10-yard split	20-yard split	20-yard shuttle	Three-cone drill	Vertical jump	Broad jump	Bench press
5 ft 9 3/4 in (1.77 m)	190 lb (86 kg)	29 3/4 in (0.76 m)	9 1/8 in (0.23 m)	4.48 s	1.51 s	2.62 s	4.40 s	6.99 s	35.0 in (0.89 m)	9 ft 10 in (3.00 m)	15 reps
All values from Pro Day

=== Washington Redskins ===
Holsey was drafted by the Washington Redskins in the seventh round, 235th overall, in the 2017 NFL draft.

Holsey did not participate in 2018 training camp and preseason games after suffering a non-football related foot injury when a table landed on him. The Redskins placed him on their non-football injury (NFI) list at the start of the 2018 season. He was activated off the NFI list on November 12, 2018, but was waived the following day and re-signed to the practice squad. He was promoted to the active roster on December 15, 2018. He was placed on injured reserve on December 18, 2018, and was waived on May 13, 2019.

=== Oakland Raiders ===
On August 13, 2019, Holsey was signed by the Oakland Raiders. He was waived during final roster cuts on August 30, 2019.
