= Robert Davis (wide receiver) =

American football player (born 1995)

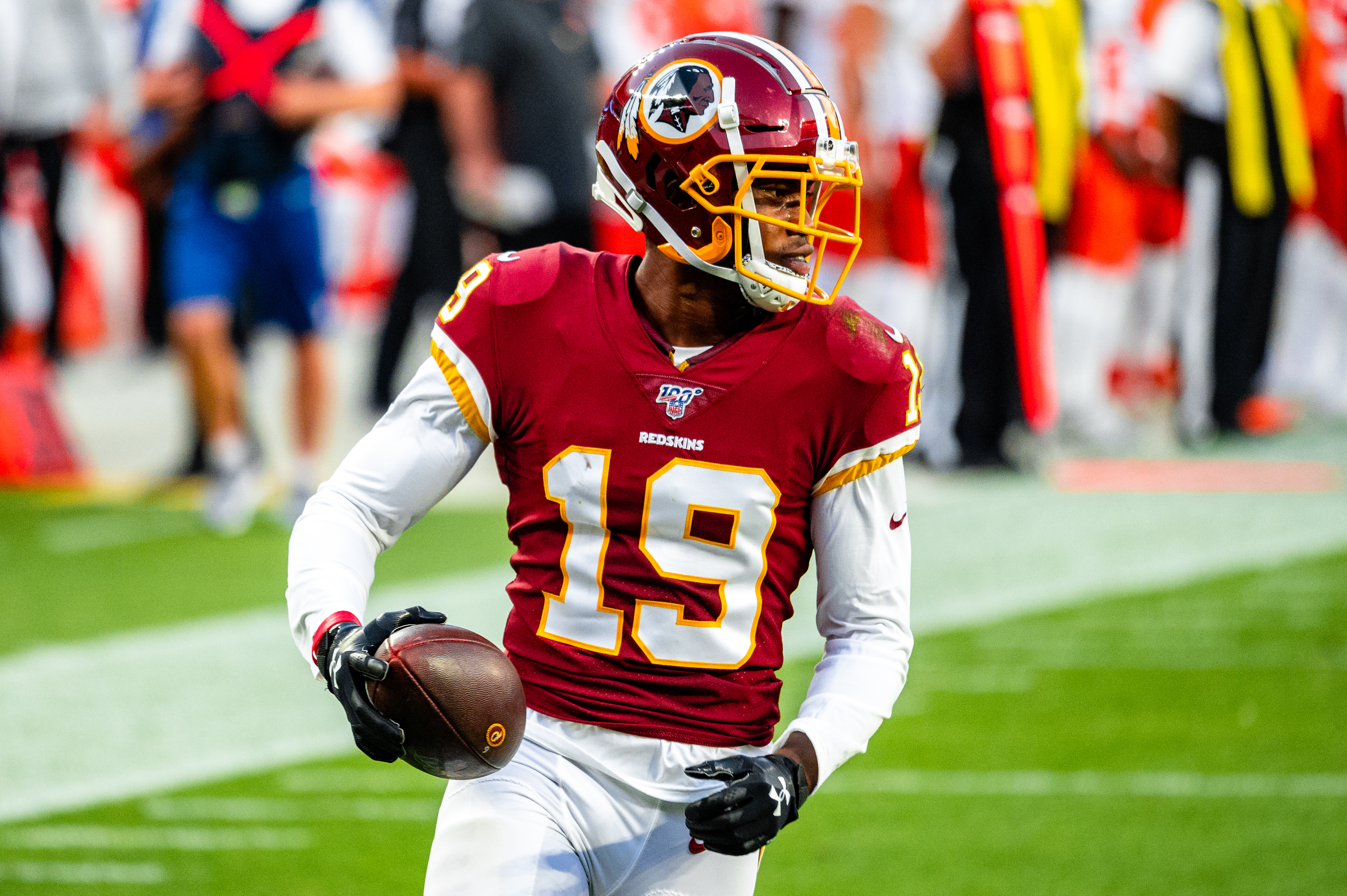
- Davis with the Washington Redskins in 2019

No. 14
- Position: Wide receiver

Personal information
- Born: April 2, 1995 (age 31); Warner Robins, Georgia, U.S.
- Listed height: 6 ft 3 in (1.91 m)
- Listed weight: 210 lb (95 kg)

Career information
- High school: Northside (Warner Robins)
- College: Georgia State (2013–2016)
- NFL draft: 2017: 6th round, 209th overall pick

Career history
- Washington Redskins (2017–2019); Philadelphia Eagles (2019); Las Vegas Raiders (2020)*
- * Offseason or practice squad member only

Awards and highlights
- 2× First-team All-Sun Belt (2015–2016)

Career NFL statistics
- Receptions: 2
- Receiving yards: 17
- Stats at Pro Football Reference

Robert Jamal Davis (born April 2, 1995) is an American former professional football player who was a wide receiver in the National Football League (NFL). He played college football for the Georgia State Panthers, and was selected by the Washington Redskins in the sixth round of the 2017 NFL draft. He also played for the Philadelphia Eagles.

== College career ==
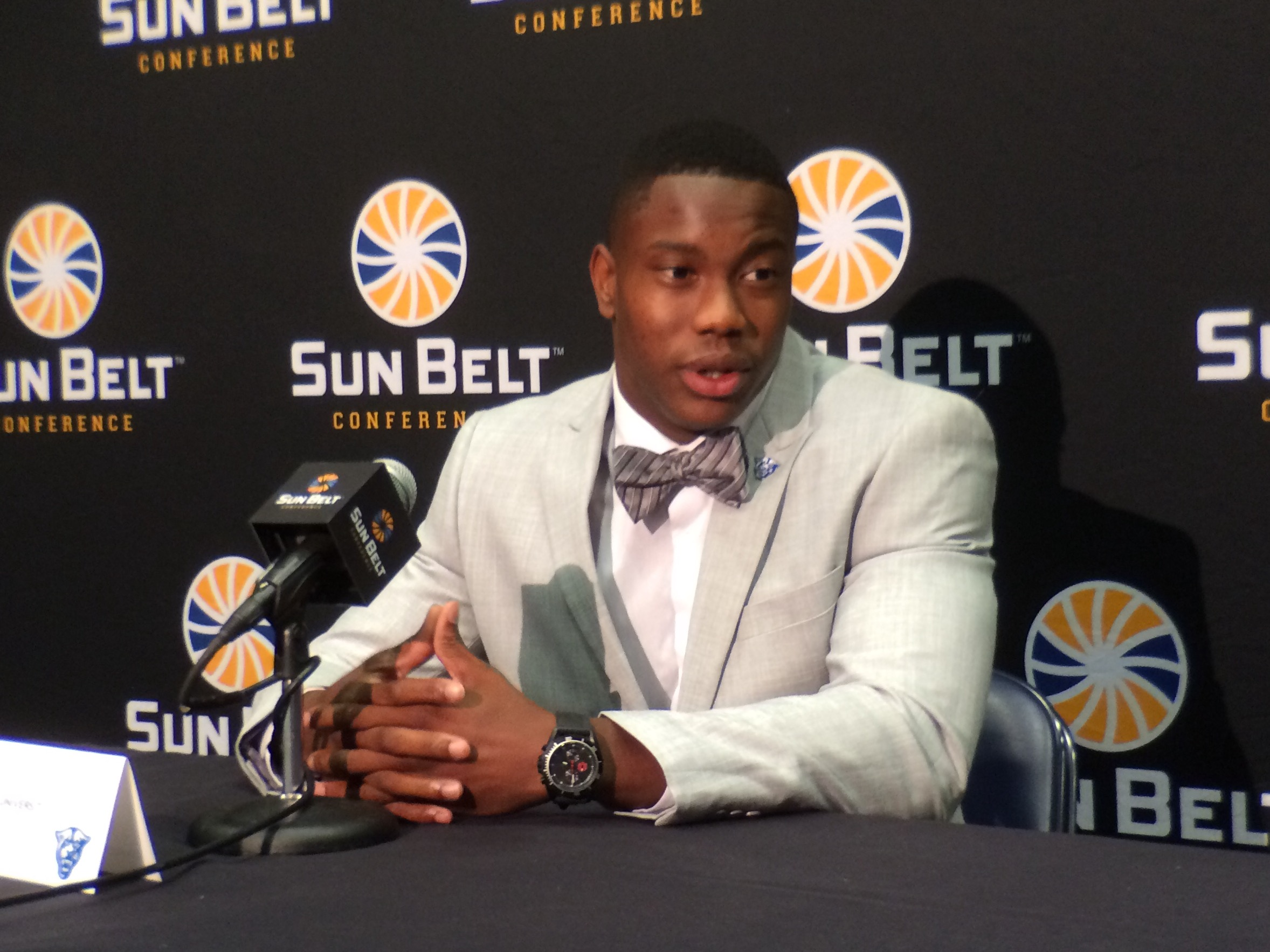
Davis in 2016

Davis played for Georgia State University from 2013 through 2016 and was honored as All-Sun Belt Conference (first-team) in 2015 and 2016 and as All-Sun Belt (honorable mention) in 2014. He finished as Georgia State's career leader in receptions (222) and receiving yards (3,391), which broke the records of his former teammate Albert Wilson. Davis finished second to Wilson with 17 touchdown receptions, 10 100-yard games and 3,394 all-purpose yards. Davis had at least one reception in every game he played (49 straight), the longest active streak in Football Bowl Subdivision at the time. Davis stands second in Sun Belt history (to T. Y. Hilton, FIU, 3,531) in career receiving yards, fifth in receptions and finished ranked eighth among all active FBS players in career receiving yards and thirteenth in receptions.

== Professional career ==
Pre-draft measurables
Height	Weight	Arm length	Hand span	40-yard dash	20-yard shuttle	Three-cone drill	Vertical jump	Broad jump	Bench press
6 ft 2 5/8 in (1.90 m)	219 lb (99 kg)	33 in (0.84 m)	9 5/8 in (0.24 m)	4.44 s	4.28 s	6.82 s	41.0 in (1.04 m)	11 ft 4 in (3.45 m)	19 reps
All values from NFL Combine

=== Washington Redskins ===
Davis was drafted by Washington Redskins in the sixth round, 209th overall, in the 2017 NFL draft. On September 2, 2017, he was waived by the team and was signed to the practice squad the next day. He was promoted to the active roster on December 4, 2017.

On August 13, 2018, Davis was placed on injured reserve after suffering a broken tibia and a torn LCL during training camp, keeping him out the entire 2018 season. Davis was waived by the Redskins on September 7, 2019 and re-signed to the practice squad. He was promoted to the active roster on September 13, 2019. He was waived again on October 1, 2019.

=== Philadelphia Eagles ===
On October 7, 2019, Davis was signed to the Philadelphia Eagles practice squad. He was promoted to the active roster on December 12, 2019.

Davis was waived/injured by the Eagles on August 25, 2020, and subsequently reverted to the team's injured reserve list the next day. He was waived with an injury settlement on September 3.

=== Las Vegas Raiders ===
On September 28, 2020, Davis was signed to the Las Vegas Raiders practice squad. He was placed on the practice squad/injured list on October 27, and restored to the practice squad on December 4. He was released on December 5, 2020.

== Personal life ==
Davis' older cousin is retired NFL linebacker Thomas Davis.
