= Fabian Moreau =

American football player (born 1994)

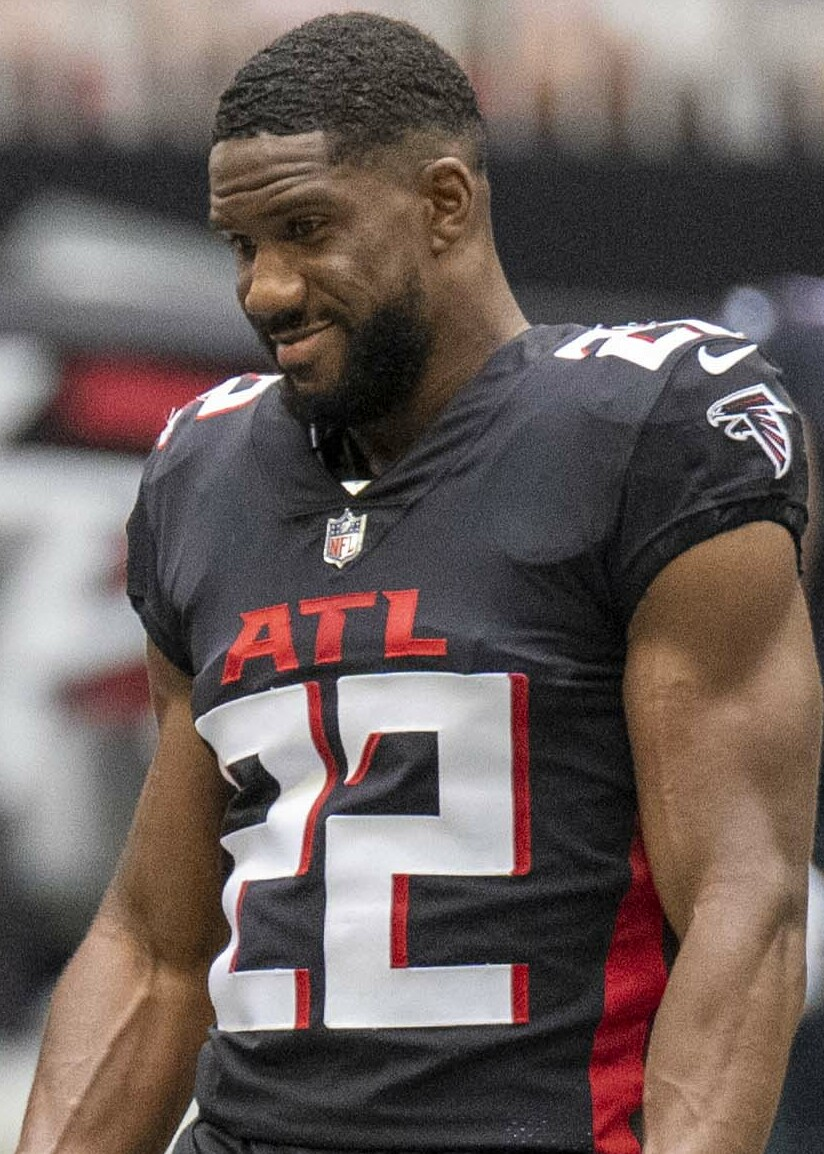
- Moreau with the Atlanta Falcons in 2021

No. 24 – Washington Commanders
- Position: Cornerback
- Roster status: Active

Personal information
- Born: April 9, 1994 (age 32); Fort Lauderdale, Florida, U.S.
- Listed height: 6 ft 0 in (1.83 m)
- Listed weight: 204 lb (93 kg)

Career information
- High school: Western (Davie, Florida)
- College: UCLA (2012–2016)
- NFL draft: 2017: 3rd round, 81st overall pick

Career history
- Washington Redskins / Football Team (2017–2020); Atlanta Falcons (2021); Houston Texans (2022)*; New York Giants (2022); Denver Broncos (2023); Minnesota Vikings (2024); San Francisco 49ers (2025)*; Minnesota Vikings (2025); Washington Commanders (2026–present)
- * Offseason or practice squad member only

Career NFL statistics as of 2025
- Tackles: 322
- Forced fumbles: 3
- Fumble recoveries: 1
- Pass deflections: 45
- Interceptions: 7
- Stats at Pro Football Reference

Fabian Moreau (born April 9, 1994) is an American professional football cornerback for the Washington Commanders of the National Football League (NFL). He played college football for the UCLA Bruins and was selected by the Washington Redskins in the third round of the 2017 NFL draft. He has played for the Atlanta Falcons, New York Giants, Denver Broncos, and Minnesota Vikings.

== Early life ==
Moreau attended Western High School in Davie, Florida. He played running back and wide receiver. A 3-star recruit, Moreau committed to UCLA to play college football over offers from Boston College, Illinois, Northwestern, Vanderbilt, and Wake Forest, among others.

== College career ==
Moreau switched from running back to cornerback for UCLA, where he played from 2012 to 2016. He became a starter his sophomore year in 2013. He missed most of 2015 with a broken foot. During his career, Moreau had 149 tackles and three interceptions.

== Professional career ==
Coming out of UCLA, Moreau was projected by the majority of NFL draft experts and scouts to be a late first or second round pick. On January 21, 2017, he participated in the 2017 East-West Shrine Game and had an impressive performance that helped the West win 10–3. Moreau also received an invitation to the Reese's Senior Bowl, but declined due to being "nicked up". He received an invitation to the NFL Combine and completed nearly all of the required combine and positional drills, but opted to skip the bench press. On March 21, 2017, Moreau participated at UCLA's pro day and suffered a pectoral injury during his bench press. All 32 NFL teams had team representatives and scouts present to scout Moreau, Conor McDermott, Kenny Walker, Jayon Brown, Eddie Vanderdoes, and nine other prospects. He also performed positional drills for coaches that included Oakland Raiders' defensive backs coach Rod Woodson. The injury he suffered during the bench was first thought to be a strain, but was later discovered to be a torn pectoral muscle. On March 22, 2017, he had surgery to repair the injury. After suffering the injury, many analysts projected him to fall to the third round due to his history of injuries and a deep cornerback position in the draft. On March 21, 2017, he had a private meeting with the Detroit Lions. He was ranked the ninth best cornerback in the draft by NFLDraftScout.com and ranked the 11th best by NFL analyst Mike Mayock.

Pre-draft measurables
Height	Weight	Arm length	Hand span	Wingspan	40-yard dash	10-yard split	20-yard split	20-yard shuttle	Three-cone drill	Vertical jump	Broad jump
6 ft 0 1/2 in (1.84 m)	206 lb (93 kg)	31 3/8 in (0.80 m)	9 in (0.23 m)	6 ft 3 3/4 in (1.92 m)	4.35 s	1.52 s	2.51 s	4.12 s	6.94 s	38 in (0.97 m)	11 ft 4 in (3.45 m)
All values from NFL Combine

=== Washington Redskins / Football Team ===
The Washington Redskins selected Moreau in the third round (81st overall) of the 2017 NFL draft. He was the 12th cornerback selected in the draft.

On May 26, 2017, the Washington Redskins signed Moreau to a four-year, $3.33 million contract that includes a signing bonus of $825,392.

He competed with Kendall Fuller, Dashaun Phillips, and Josh Holsey for the job as the Redskins' starting nickelback. Head coach Jay Gruden named Moreau the Redskins' fifth cornerback on the depth chart to begin the season, behind Josh Norman, Bashaud Breeland, Kendall Fuller, and Quinton Dunbar.

He made his professional regular season debut in the Redskins' season-opening 17–30 loss to the Philadelphia Eagles. The following week, he made the first tackle of his career in a 27–20 victory over the Los Angeles Rams. On October 15, 2017, Moreau recorded three combined tackles and his first career pass deflection during a 26–24 win against the San Francisco 49ers.

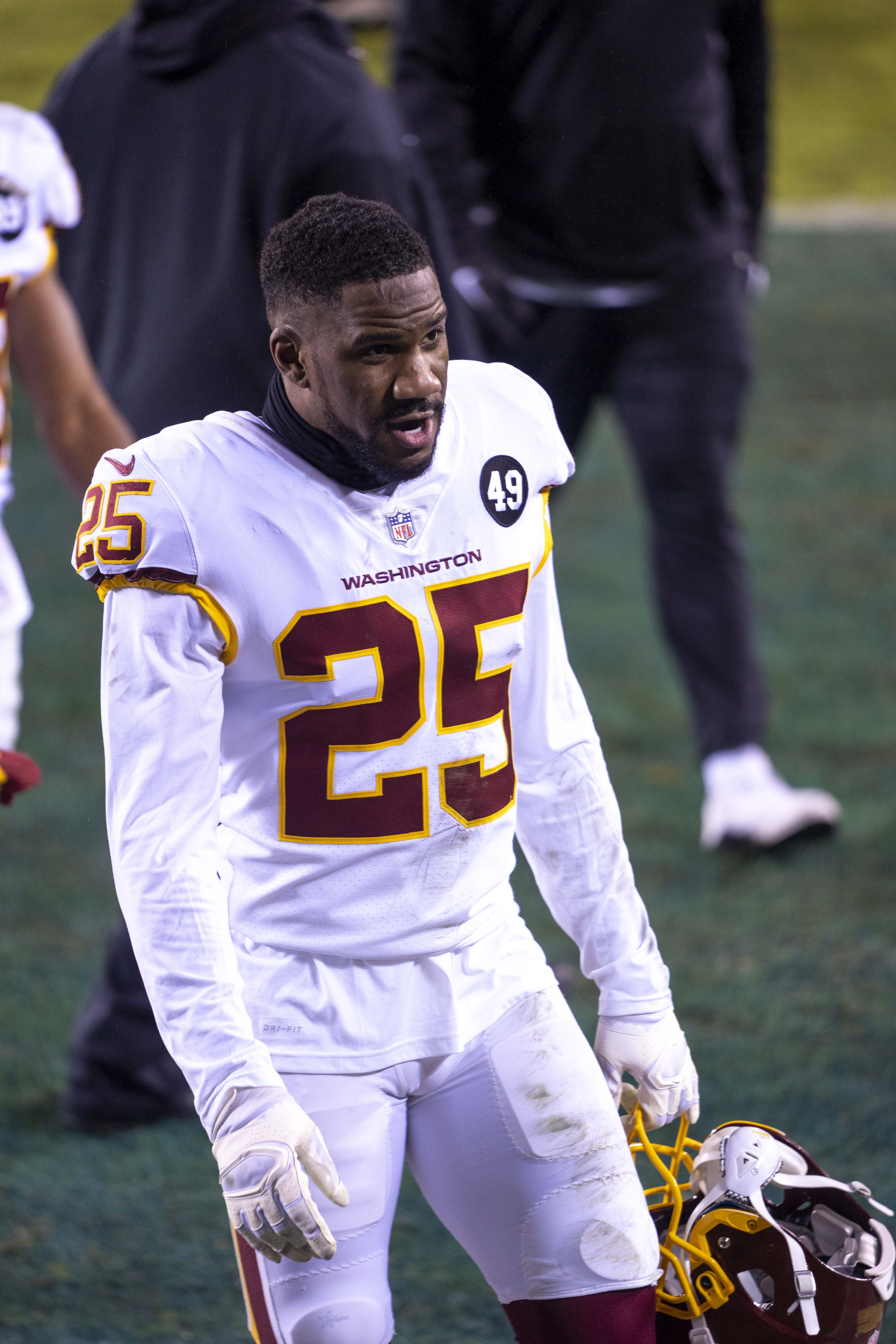
Moreau playing for Washington in January 2021

Having primarily started as the team's nickelback, interim head coach Bill Callahan had Moreau start outside replacing Josh Norman and playing opposite of Quinton Dunbar in Week 12 of 2019. In his first start outside against the Lions, Moreau intercepted two passes thrown by Jeff Driskel in the 19–16 win. In the following week against the Carolina Panthers, Moreau recorded his third interception of the season off a pass thrown by Kyle Allen in the 29–21 win. He was placed on injured reserve on December 27, 2019. He finished the season with 44 tackles, five passes defensed, and three interceptions through 12 games and seven starts.

Moreau made his return from injury in Week 1 of the 2020 season against the Eagles. During the game, Moreau intercepted a pass thrown by Carson Wentz in the 27–17 win. In Week 11 against the Cincinnati Bengals, Moreau intercepted a pass thrown by Ryan Finley late in the fourth quarter to secure a 20–9 win for the Football Team.

=== Atlanta Falcons ===
On March 25, 2021, Moreau signed a one-year contract with the Atlanta Falcons.

=== Houston Texans ===
On May 31, 2022, Moreau signed with the Houston Texans. He was released on August 24.

=== New York Giants ===
On September 5, 2022, Moreau was signed to the New York Giants' practice squad. Moreau was elevated from the practice squad for the team's Week 2 and Week 3 games against the Carolina Panthers and Dallas Cowboys. On September 28, he was promoted to the active roster. Moreau finished the season with 749 snaps, a career high 66 tackles, and 10 pass defended. Moreau also had three performances this season where he kept the reception rate of his targets below 45 percent in 30 pass coverage snaps or more.

=== Denver Broncos ===
On August 2, 2023, Moreau signed with the Denver Broncos.

=== Minnesota Vikings ===
On July 31, 2024, Moreau signed with the Minnesota Vikings.

=== San Francisco 49ers ===
On August 4, 2025, Moreau signed with the San Francisco 49ers. He was released on August 26 as part of final roster cuts.

=== Minnesota Vikings (second stint) ===
Moreau was signed to the Minnesota Vikings practice squad on August 27, 2025. On November 8, he was signed to the active roster.

=== Washington Commanders ===
On August 4, 2026, Moreau signed with the Washington Commanders. He was released by Washington on August 30, and was re-signed the following day.

== Personal life ==
Moreau was raised by his parents Berg and Guerly Moreau in Fort Lauderdale, Florida. He has two sisters, Faby and Fabriana. During his time at UCLA he was twice named to the Athletic Director's Honor Roll and majored in political science. He cites his hobbies as working out and playing basketball and the athletes he most admires as Michael Jordan and former Oregon running back LaMichael James. He is of Haitian descent.
