= Quinton Dunbar =

American football player (born 1992)

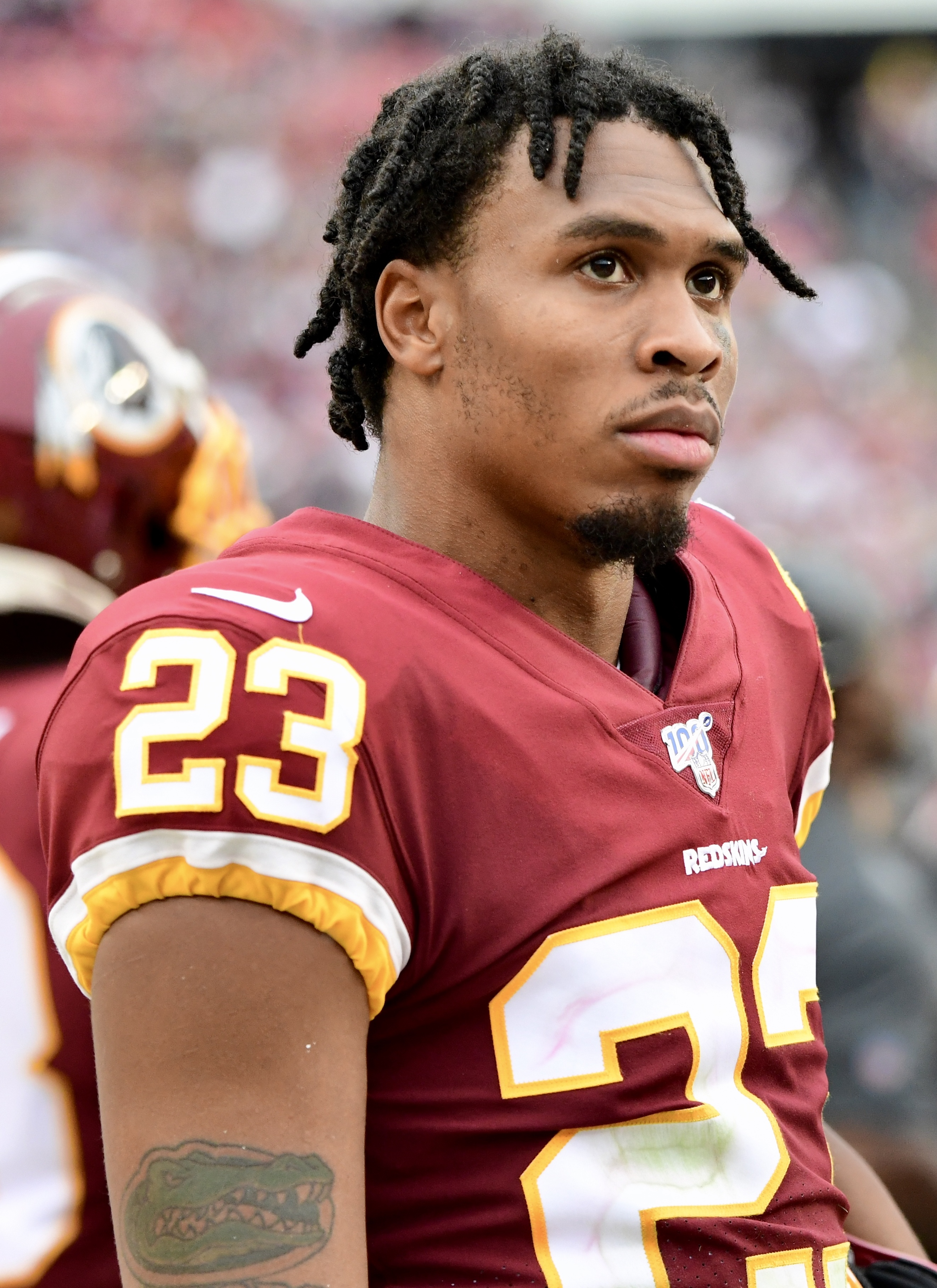
- Dunbar with the Washington Redskins in 2019

No. 47, 23, 22
- Position: Cornerback

Personal information
- Born: July 22, 1992 (age 34); Miami, Florida, U.S.
- Listed height: 6 ft 2 in (1.88 m)
- Listed weight: 201 lb (91 kg)

Career information
- High school: Booker T. Washington (Miami)
- College: Florida (2010–2014)
- NFL draft: 2015: undrafted

Career history
- Washington Redskins (2015–2019); Seattle Seahawks (2020); Detroit Lions (2021)*; Arizona Cardinals (2021)*; Green Bay Packers (2021)*
- * Offseason or practice squad member only

Career NFL statistics
- Total tackles: 180
- Sacks: 1.0
- Fumble recoveries: 1
- Pass deflections: 40
- Interceptions: 10
- Stats at Pro Football Reference

Quinton Disheen Dunbar (born July 22, 1992) is an American former professional football player who was a cornerback in the National Football League (NFL). He played college football as a wide receiver for the Florida Gators before signing with the Washington Redskins as an undrafted free agent in 2015, where he converted to cornerback. He was also a member of the Seattle Seahawks, Detroit Lions, Arizona Cardinals, and Green Bay Packers.

== Early life ==
Quinton Disheen Dunbar was born on July 22, 1992, in Miami, Florida. He attended Booker T. Washington High School in Miami.

== College career ==
A four-star recruit, Dunbar accepted an athletic scholarship to attend the University of Florida over offers from Arkansas, Central Florida, Florida International, Michigan, Purdue, Tennessee, and West Virginia. He played for coach Urban Meyer in 2010 and coach Will Muschamp from 2011 to 2014 as a Florida Gator wide receiver through five seasons. In his freshman season, he played in one game in 2010 against the Miami RedHawks on opening day and ultimately redshirted. From 2011-2014, Dunbar played in 48 games as a wide receiver, starting 34 games and recording 110 receptions for 1,480 yards and 8 touchdowns.

== Professional career ==
Pre-draft measurables
Height	Weight	Arm length	Hand span	40-yard dash	10-yard split	20-yard split	20-yard shuttle	Three-cone drill	Vertical jump	Broad jump	Bench press
6 ft 1 5/8 in (1.87 m)	201 lb (91 kg)	32 5/8 in (0.83 m)	9 1/2 in (0.24 m)	4.44 s	1.47 s	2.47 s	4.16 s	7.10 s	35 in (0.89 m)	10 ft 0 in (3.05 m)	7 reps
All values from Florida's Pro Day

=== Washington Redskins ===
==== 2015 ====
After Dunbar went undrafted in the 2015 NFL draft, he signed a three-year contract with the Washington Redskins on May 11, 2015. Dunbar entered training camp as a backup wide receiver and special teams' player, competing for a roster spot. On August 7, it was reported that the Redskins decided to change Dunbar's position from wide receiver to cornerback. He was moved to cornerback after coaches recognized his ability to successfully block (or "jam") return specialists during punt returns. The position change was also due to multiple injuries in the Redskins' secondary, as well as to give Dunbar a better opportunity to make the roster. In a corresponding move, Dunbar changed his jersey number from No. 17 to No. 47.

On September 5, Dunbar was waived as part of the team's final roster cuts, but was signed to their practice squad the following day. On September 29, the Redskins promoted Dunbar to their active roster. Head coach Jay Gruden named Dunbar the fifth cornerback on the depth chart, behind DeAngelo Hall, Chris Culliver, Bashaud Breeland, and Will Blackmon.

On October 4, Dunbar made his professional regular season debut during the Redskins' 23–20 win against the Philadelphia Eagles in Week 4. He was inactive for the Redskins' Week 10 win against the New Orleans Saints as a healthy scratch. In November, Dunbar became the third cornerback on the depth chart after the Redskins decided to move cornerback Hall to safety and placed Culliver on injured reserve with a torn ACL and MCL. On November 29, Dunbar recorded two solo tackles, deflected two passes, and made his first career interception during a 20–14 victory against the New York Giants in Week 12. He made his first career interception off a pass by Giants' quarterback Eli Manning in the end zone, but exited the game shortly thereafter due to a dislocated finger. In Week 14, Dunbar earned his first career start and made two combined tackles in a 24–21 win at the Chicago Bears. He was inactive for the Redskins' Week 17 win at the Dallas Cowboys as a healthy scratch. HC Gruden decided to rest him, along with multiple starters, as the Redskins had already clinched a playoff berth with a 9–7 record. He finished his rookie season in 2015 with 13 combined tackles (11 solo), five pass deflections, and an interception in 11 games with two starts.

On January 10, 2016, Dunbar appeared in his first career playoff game; he made five solo tackles and broke up two passes in the Redskins' 35–18 loss to the Green Bay Packers in the NFC wild card Game.

==== 2016 ====
Throughout training camp, Dunbar competed to be the third cornerback on the Redskins' depth chart against Dashaun Phillips and rookie Kendall Fuller. Head coach Jay Gruden named Dunbar the third cornerback on the depth chart to start the regular season, behind starters Josh Norman and Bashaud Breeland.

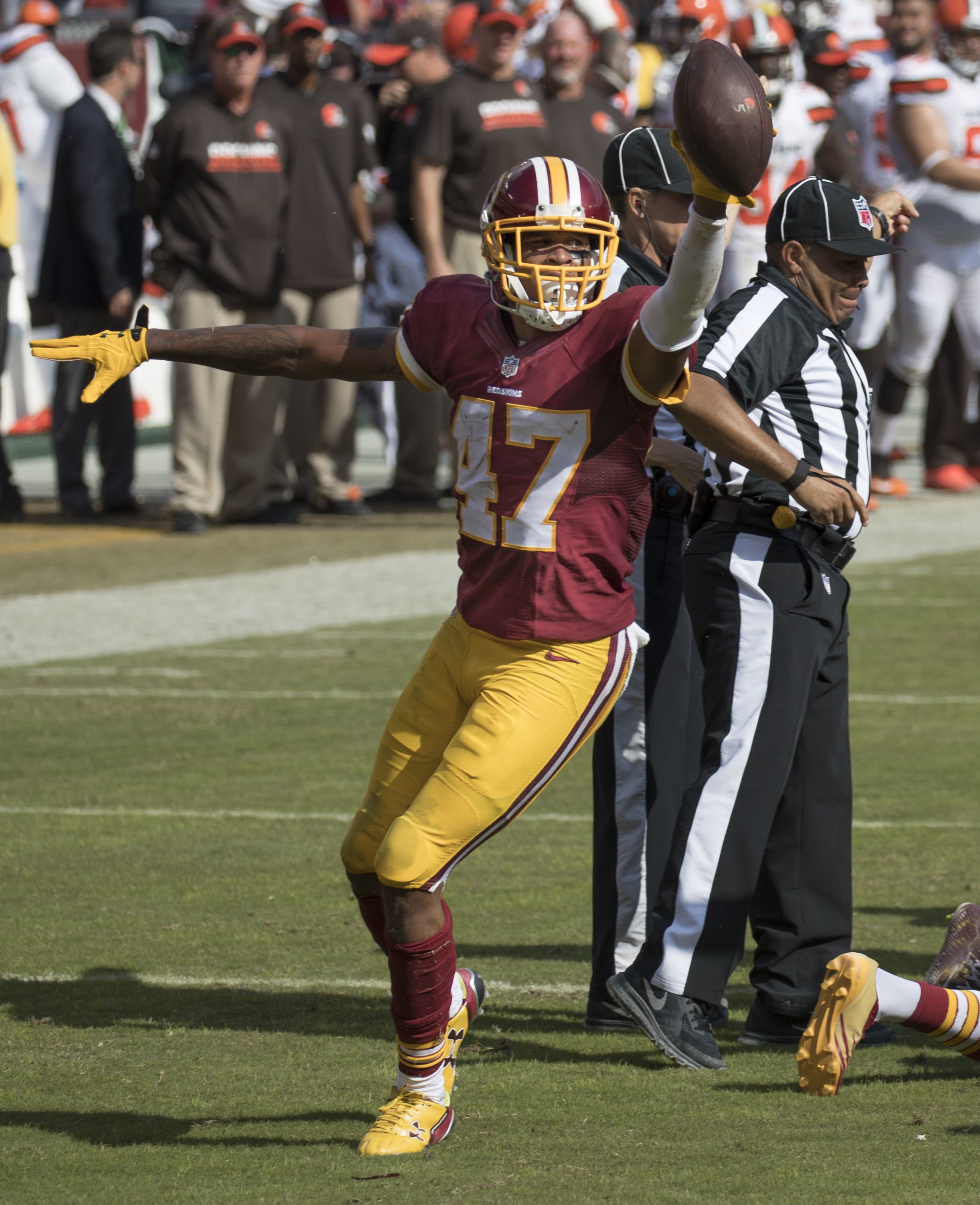
Dunbar with the Redskins in 2016

On September 25, 2016, Dunbar recorded three solo tackles, a pass deflection, intercepted a pass by Giants' quarterback Eli Manning in the end zone, and made his first career reception after catching a 31-yard pass from punter, Tress Way, on a fake punt play during their 29–27 win at the Giants in Week 3. In Week 5, he collected a season-high five solo tackles during a 16–10 win at the Baltimore Ravens in Week 5. On December 19, 2016, Dunbar deflected two passes, made one tackle, and made his first career sack on Panthers' quarterback Cam Newton in the Redskins' 26–15 loss to the Carolina Panthers in Week 15. He exited the game in the third quarter after suffering a concussion and was sidelined for the last two games (Weeks 16–17). Dunbar finished the 2016 NFL season with 26 combined tackles (23 solo), five pass deflections, one interception, and a sack in 14 games and two starts.

==== 2017 ====
On January 6, 2017, the Washington Redskins announced their decision to fire defensive coordinator Joe Barry and defensive backs coach Perry Fewell after the defense finished the previous season ranked 28th in the league in total yards. On January 23, 2017, the Washington Redskins promoted outside linebackers coach Greg Manusky to defensive coordinator. During training camp in 2017, Dunbar competed to be the Redskins' nickelback against Kendall Fuller and rookie Fabian Moreau. Head coach Jay Gruden named Dunbar the third cornerback on the depth chart to start the season, behind starters Josh Norman and Bashaud Breeland.

In Week 6, he collected a season-high eight combined tackles and deflected two pass during a 26–24 victory against the San Francisco 49ers. The following week, Dunbar recorded four solo tackles, broke up two passes, and made his third career interception off a pass by Eagles' quarterback Carson Wentz in the Redskins' 34–24 loss at the Eagles in Week 7. Dunbar was inactive for the Redskins' Week 11 loss at the Saints due to an undisclosed illness. Dunbar completed the 2017 NFL season with 35 combined tackles (30 solo), eight passes defensed, and an interception in 15 games and four starts.

==== 2018 ====
On January 1, 2018, the Washington Redskins signed Dunbar to a three-year, $10.50 million contract that includes $5.25 million guaranteed and a signing bonus of $3 million.

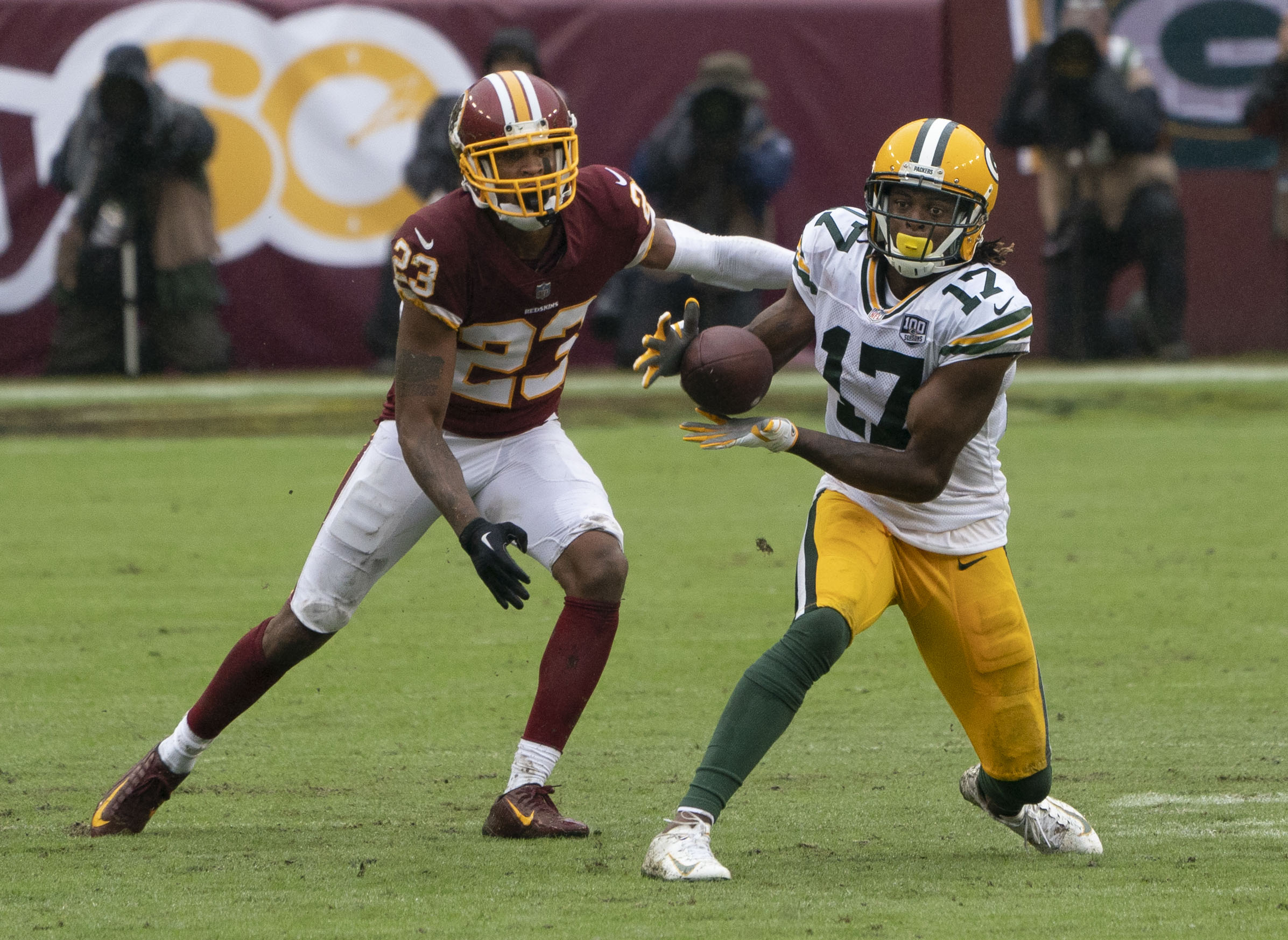
Dunbar in a game against Davante Adams and the Green Bay Packers in 2018

Dunbar entered training camp slated as a starting cornerback after Bashaud Breeland departed in free agency and Kendall Fuller was traded to the Kansas City Chiefs. On June 15, 2018, Dunbar officially changed his jersey number from No. 47 to No. 23. He changed his number to No. 23 after it became available following the departure of longtime veteran DeAngelo Hall. Head coach Jay Gruden named Dunbar and Josh Norman the starting cornerbacks to begin the regular season in 2018. They started the season alongside safeties D. J. Swearinger and Montae Nicholson.

On September 9, 2018, Dunbar recorded five combined tackles, made a career-high three pass deflections, and intercepted a pass by quarterback Sam Bradford during a 24–6 victory at the Arizona Cardinals in Week 1. He played in seven games before being placed on injured reserve on December 5, 2018, with a leg injury.

==== 2019 ====
In Week 4 against the New York Giants, Dunbar intercepted rookie quarterback Daniel Jones twice in the 24–3 loss. In Week 6 against the Miami Dolphins, Dunbar recorded an interception off Josh Rosen in the 17–16 win. In Week 12 against the Detroit Lions, Dunbar intercepted his former QB at University of Florida, Jeff Driskel, which set up the game winning field goal to beat the Lions. In Week 14, he suffered a hamstring injury, which knocked him out the next two games before being placed on injured reserve on December 24, 2019. He finished the season starting 11 games, recording 37 tackles, eight passes defensed, and a career-high and team-leading four interceptions.

=== Seattle Seahawks ===
On March 24, 2020, Dunbar was traded to the Seattle Seahawks for a fifth-round pick in the 2020 NFL draft. He was placed on the commissioner's exempt list on July 27, 2020, following his May 2020 arrest. He was removed from the commissioner's exempt list on August 9, after the charges against him were dropped.

In Week 2 against the New England Patriots on Sunday Night Football, Dunbar recorded his first interception as a Seahawk off a pass thrown by Cam Newton during the 35–30 win. He was placed on injured reserve on November 19, 2020, with a knee injury. He was designated to return from injured reserve on December 9 and began practicing with the team again, but underwent knee surgery on December 29 and did not return for the remainder of the season.

=== Detroit Lions ===
Dunbar signed with the Detroit Lions on April 6, 2021, but was released prior to playing any games on August 12.

=== Arizona Cardinals ===
On September 29, 2021, Dunbar signed with the Arizona Cardinals' practice squad. He was released by the Cardinals on October 5.

=== Green Bay Packers ===
Dunbar signed with the Green Bay Packers' practice squad on October 13, 2021. He was released by the Packers on October 19.

== Career statistics ==
=== NFL ===
Legend
**Bold**	Career high

==== Regular season ====
Year	Team	Games		Tackles					Interceptions					Fumbles			
Year	Team	GP	GS	Cmb	Solo	Ast	Sck	TFL	Int	Yds	TD	Lng	PD	FF	FR	Yds	TD
2015	WAS	11	2	13	11	2	0.0	0	1	0	0	0	5	0	0	0	0
2016	WAS	14	2	26	23	3	**1.0**	1	1	0	0	0	5	0	**1**	0	0
2017	WAS	**15**	4	35	30	5	0.0	1	1	0	0	0	8	0	0	0	0
2018	WAS	7	6	**39**	**35**	4	0.0	0	2	**21**	0	**24**	**9**	0	0	0	0
2019	WAS	11	**11**	37	31	**6**	0.0	1	**4**	6	0	6	8	0	0	0	0
2020	SEA	6	6	30	28	2	0.0	**2**	1	0	0	0	5	0	0	0	0
		64	31	180	158	22	1.0	5	10	27	0	24	40	0	1	0	0

==== Playoffs ====
Year	Team	Games		Tackles					Interceptions					Fumbles			
Year	Team	GP	GS	Cmb	Solo	Ast	Sck	TFL	Int	Yds	TD	Lng	PD	FF	FR	Yds	TD
2015	WAS	**1**	0	**5**	**5**	0	0.0	0	0	0	0	0	**2**	0	0	0	0
		1	0	5	5	0	0.0	0	0	0	0	0	2	0	0	0	0

=== College ===
Year	GP	Rec	Yds	Avg	Yds/G
2010	1	0	0	0	0
2011	12	14	216	15.4	27.0
2012	13	36	383	10.6	29.5
2013	12	40	548	13.7	45.7
2014	11	21	353	16.8	44.1

== Personal life ==
Dunbar's cousin is NFL linebacker Denzel Perryman. Dunbar has one daughter, Denim, who was born in July 2016.

On May 14, 2020, an arrest warrant was issued by the Miramar Police Department, alleging Dunbar committed armed robbery alongside New York Giants cornerback Deandre Baker at a party the day before. On May 15, 2020, his attorney claimed to be in possession of affidavits from witnesses that state that Dunbar was not involved in the robbery. The next morning on May 16, 2020, both Dunbar and Baker turned themselves in to the police. The following day it was announced that Dunbar had posted bail for $100,000. Dunbar pleaded not guilty to charges. On August 7, 2020, all charges against Dunbar were dropped by Broward County prosecutors. Broward State Attorney Mike Satz announced Baker was charged with 4 counts of robbery with a firearm, and he was facing 10 years to life in prison if convicted. Dunbar was not charged. There was evidence provided by the state attorneys office that the alleged victims accepted $55,000 in exchange for changing their story in regards to Dunbar. Despite the fact that the witnesses by their own testimony appear to be paid off, the state attorney case filer, Alex Urella, still filed against Baker.
