= Kendall Fuller =

American football player (born 1995)

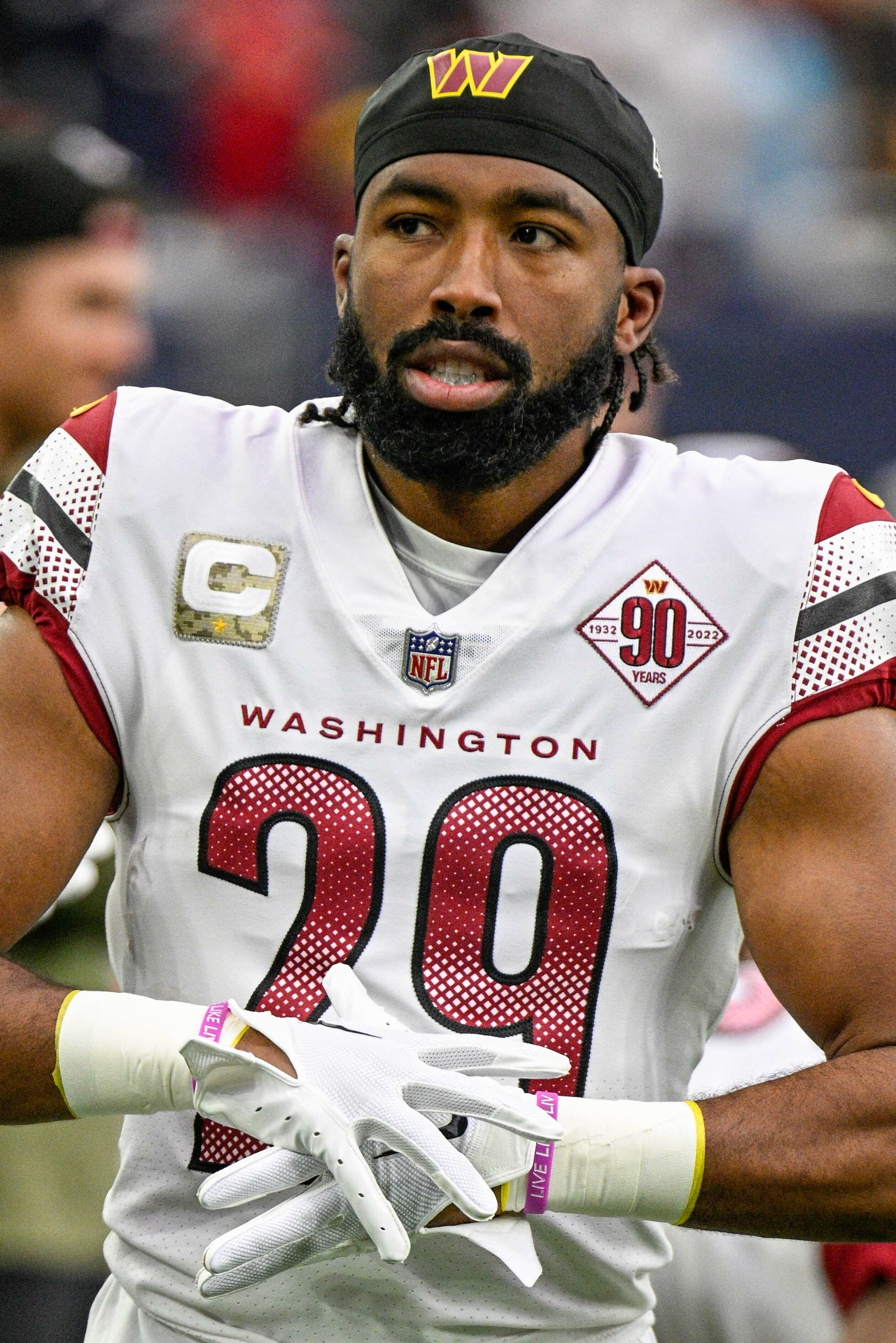
- Fuller with the Washington Commanders in 2022

Profile
- Position: Cornerback

Personal information
- Born: February 13, 1995 (age 31); Baltimore, Maryland, U.S.
- Listed height: 5 ft 11 in (1.80 m)
- Listed weight: 198 lb (90 kg)

Career information
- High school: Our Lady of Good Counsel (Olney, Maryland)
- College: Virginia Tech (2013–2015)
- NFL draft: 2016: 3rd round, 84th overall pick

Career history
- Washington Redskins (2016–2017); Kansas City Chiefs (2018–2019); Washington Football Team / Commanders (2020–2023); Miami Dolphins (2024); Detroit Lions (2025)*
- * Offseason or practice squad member only

Awards and highlights
- Super Bowl champion (LIV); Second-team All-American (2014); Freshman All-American (2013); ACC Defensive Rookie of the Year (2013); First-team All-ACC (2014); Second-team All-ACC (2013)

Career NFL statistics as of 2025
- Total tackles: 536
- Sacks: 2
- Forced fumbles: 2
- Fumble recoveries: 3
- Pass deflections: 82
- Interceptions: 16
- Touchdowns: 2
- Stats at Pro Football Reference

Kendall Christopher Fuller (born February 13, 1995) is an American professional football cornerback. He played college football for the Virginia Tech Hokies and was selected by the Washington Redskins in the third round of the 2016 NFL draft. Fuller also played for the Kansas City Chiefs, recording a game-sealing interception in Super Bowl LIV.

== Early life ==
Fuller attended Our Lady of Good Counsel High School in Olney, Maryland, where he played football and ran track. On the football varsity, he was teammates with Blake Countess and Stefon Diggs. As a senior, he was the U.S. Army All-American Defensive Player of the Year and the Maryland Gatorade Football Player of the Year after he totaled 44 receptions for 695 yards and seven touchdowns on offense, and three interceptions, eight pass breakups and 28 tackles (including a sack) on defense.

In track & field, Fuller competed in hurdles and jumps, posting bests of 17.94 seconds in the 110m hurdles, 47.81s in the 300m hurdles, 6.48 meters (21 feet, 2.5 inches) in the long jump and 13.71m (45 feet) in the triple jump.

Fuller was a five-star recruit by Rivals.com and was ranked as the second best cornerback and ninth best player overall in his class. He committed to Virginia Tech in July 2012 to play college football, over offers from Alabama, Clemson, Florida, Michigan, Ohio State, Ole Miss, and South Carolina, among others.

== College career ==
As a true freshman in 2013, Fuller started 12 of 13 games, recording 58 tackles and six interceptions. For his play he was named the Atlantic Coast Conference Defensive Rookie of the Year. Fuller returned as a starter his sophomore season in 2014. On December 15, 2015, Fuller declared for the 2016 NFL draft.

=== College statistics ===
Season	Games		Tackles				Fumbles		Interceptions		
Season	GP	GS	Cmb	Solo	Ast	Sck	FF	FR	Int	TD	PD
2013	13	12	58	38	20	0.5	1	1	6	0	17
2014	13	13	54	32	22	2	0	1	2	1	17
2015	3	3	7	3	4	1	1	0	0	0	1
Career	29	28	119	73	46	3.5	2	2	8	1	35

== Professional career ==
=== Pre-draft ===
Fuller attended the NFL Scouting Combine, but was unable to perform any physical drills due to a torn meniscus he suffered in the fall. Before his meniscus tear, Fuller was projected to be a first round pick by NFL draft experts and scouts. Fuller was ranked the fifth best cornerback prospect in the draft by DraftScout.com, the ninth best cornerback by NFL analyst Mike Mayock, and was ranked the 10th best defensive back prospect by Sports Illustrated.

Pre-draft measurables
Height	Weight	Arm length	Hand span	Bench press
5 ft 11 1/2 in (1.82 m)	187 lb (85 kg)	31 1/2 in (0.80 m)	10 in (0.25 m)	15 reps
All values from NFL Combine

=== Washington Redskins (first stint) ===
The Washington Redskins selected Fuller in the third round (84th overall) of the 2016 NFL draft. Fuller was the 14th cornerback selected in 2016.

External videos
- Redskins select Fuller 84th overall

==== 2016 ====
On June 2, 2016, the Washington Redskins signed Fuller to a four–year, $3.12 million rookie contract that includes a signing bonus of $718,424.

Fuller was expected to miss training camp after undergoing surgery for a torn ACL he sustained in college. He unexpectedly was able to participate in for a portion of training camp and competed against Quinton Dunbar, Greg Toler, and Dashaun Phillips to be the primary backup. He also competed to be the starting nickelback against Dashaun Phillips. Head coach Jay Gruden named him a backup and listed him as the fourth cornerback on the depth chart to start the season, behind Quinton Dunbar, Josh Norman, and Bashaud Breeland.

He was inactive for the first three games (Weeks 1–3) due to his knee injury, but made his debut in Week 4 after multiple injuries to the Redskins' secondary to Bashaud Breeland, Quinton Dunbar, and safety DeAngelo Hall. On October 2, 2016, Fuller made his professional regular season debut and earned his first career start and collected a season-high eight combined tackles (seven solo) during a 31–20 victory against the Cleveland Browns. In Week 8, he tied his season-high of seven solo tackles in the Redskins' 27-27 tie at the Cincinnati Bengals. In Week 13, Fuller made three combined tackles (two solo) during a 23–31 loss at the Arizona Cardinals. He struggled during the Week 13 loss and was subsequently replaced by Greg Toler after defensive coordinator Joe Barry demoted him to the fifth cornerback on the depth chart. He finished his rookie season in 2016 with 42 combined tackles (32 solo) and two pass deflections in 13 games with six starts.

==== 2017 ====
Throughout training camp, he competed to be the starting nickelback and also competed to be the third cornerback on the depth chart against Quinton Dunbar, Greg Toler, Deshazor Everett, Fabian Moreau, Josh Holsey, and Dashaun Phillips. Head coach Jay Gruden named him the starting nickelback and listed him as the third cornerback on the depth chart behind starters Josh Norman and Bashaud Breeland.

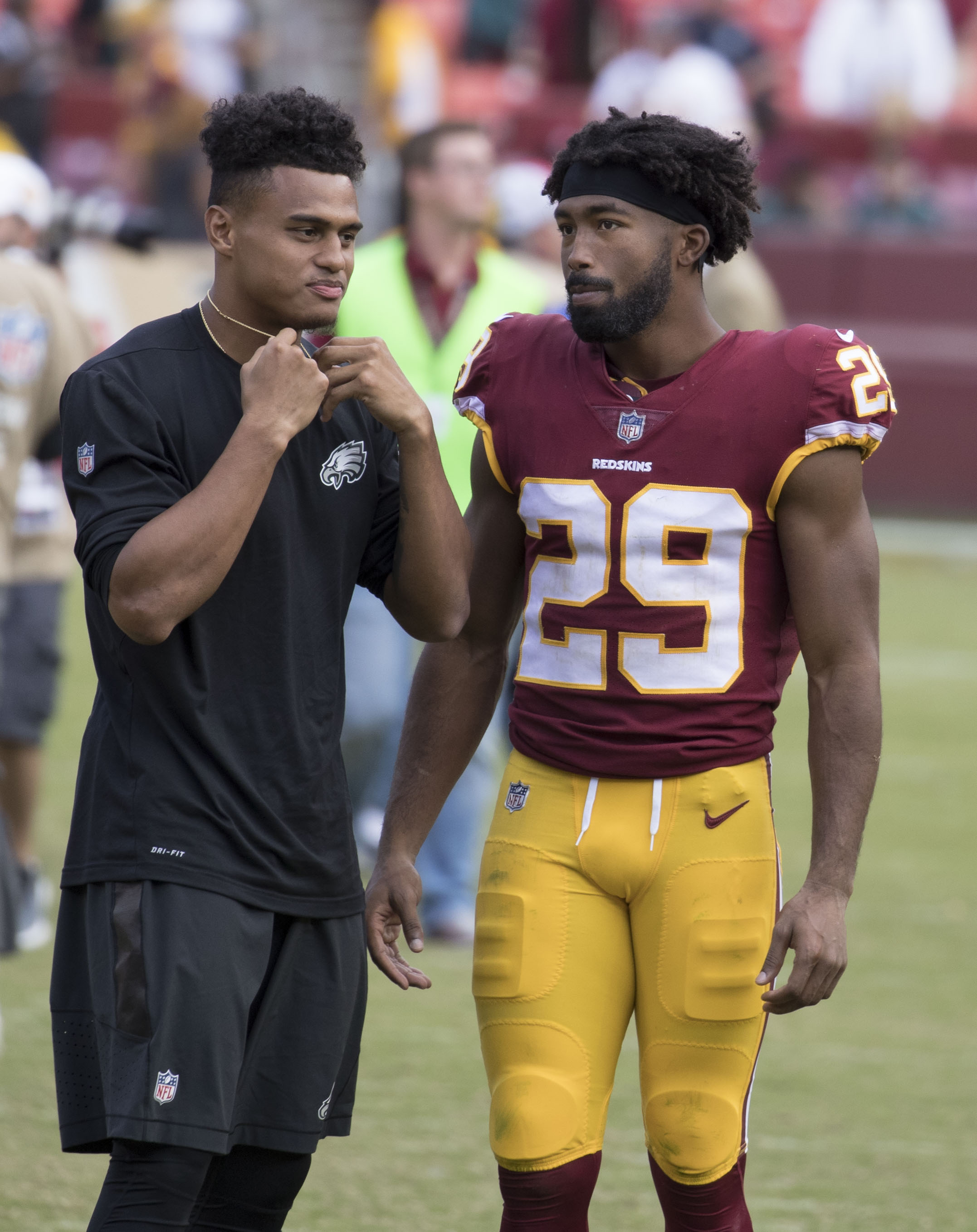
Fuller (right) in 2017

On September 24, 2017, Fuller recorded three combined tackles (one solo), deflected a pass, and made his first career interception off a pass by Derek Carr to wide receiver Seth Roberts during a 27–10 victory against the Oakland Raiders. In Week 6, Fuller made one solo tackle, set a season-high two pass deflections, and secured the Redskins' 26–24 victory against the San Francisco 49ers after intercepting a pass attempt by C. J. Beathard to tight end George Kittle in the last ten seconds game. On November 23, 2017, Fuller had one pass deflection and made game-sealing interception off a pass by Eli Manning to wide receiver Travis Rudolph in the last 1:16 of the Redskins' 20–10 victory against the New York Giants. In Week 15, he collected a season-high eight combined tackles (six solo) and tied his season-high with two pass deflections during a 20–15 win against the Arizona Cardinals. He finished the 2017 season with 55 combined tackles (43 solo), ten pass deflections, and four interceptions in 16 games with as many starts. He received an overall grade of 90.6 from Pro Football Focus in 2017, which is a career-high.

=== Kansas City Chiefs ===
==== 2018 ====
On March 14, 2018, the Washington Redskins traded Fuller and a third round pick (78th overall) in the 2018 NFL draft to the Kansas City Chiefs in return for quarterback Alex Smith. This trade coincided with the Chiefs decision to trade starting cornerback Marcus Peters to the Los Angeles Rams. During the off-season, the Chiefs revamped their cornerbacks on the roster after trading Marcus Peters, releasing Darrelle Revis, and following the departures of Terrance Mitchell, Kenneth Acker, and Phillip Gaines.

Entering training camp, Fuller was projected to be a starting cornerback and faced competition from Steven Nelson, David Amerson, Keith Reaser, and Will Redmond. Head coach Andy Reid named Fuller the No. 1 starting cornerback to begin the season and paired him with Steven Nelson.

On October 28, 2018, Fuller made five combined tackles (three solo), a pass deflection, and helped secure the Chiefs' 23-30 victory against the Denver Broncos with an interception on a pass thrown by Case Keenum to wide receiver Demaryius Thomas mid-way through the fourth quarter. In Week 13, he collected a season-high eight combined tackles (seven solo) during a 40–33 win at the Oakland Raiders. The following week, Fuller recorded seven combined tackles (five solo) and set a career-high with four pass deflections as the Chiefs defeated the Baltimore Ravens in overtime 24–27. During the game, Fuller injured his wrist and decided to play through the injury after having it wrapped in Week 15. On December 13, 2018, Fuller made two combined tackles (one solo), a pass deflection, and intercepted a pass attempt by Philip Rivers to wide receiver Tyrell Williams as the Chiefs lost to the Los Angeles Chargers 28–29 on Thursday Night Football. During the game, Fuller further injured his wrist, but managed to finish the contest. The following day, it was reported Fuller had actually suffered a fracture to his wrist that necessitated surgery and he subsequently was inactive for the Chiefs' 31–38 loss at the Seattle Seahawks in Week 16. He finished his first season with the Chiefs with a career-high 82 combined tackles (64 solo), 12 pass deflections, and two interceptions in 15 games with 15 starts.

The Kansas City Chiefs finished first in the AFC West with a 12–4 record in 2018 to clinch a first-round bye. On January 12, 2019, Fuller started in his first playoff game appearance and made three combined tackles (two solo) and a pass deflection as the Chiefs defeated the Indianapolis Colts 31–13 in the Divisional Round. On January 20, 2019, Fuller recorded ten combined tackles (seven solo) during a 31–37 overtime loss against the New England Patriots in the AFC Championship Game.

==== 2019 ====
On January 24, 2019, the Chiefs hired Steve Spagnuolo as their new defensive coordinator after firing Bob Sutton six days prior. Throughout training camp, Fuller competed to be a starting cornerback against Morris Claiborne, Bashaud Breeland, Charvarius Ward, and Herb Miller. Head coach Andy Reid named Fuller the starting nickelback and listed him as the third cornerback on the depth chart to begin the season, behind starters Bashaud Breeland and Charvarius Ward.

On September 15, 2019, Fuller made six combined tackles (five solo), one pass deflection, and had his first career sack on Derek Carr for a six–yard loss during a 28–10 victory at the Oakland Raiders. The following week, he collected a season-high eight combined tackles (seven solo) as the Chiefs defeated the Baltimore Ravens 33–28 in Week 3. In Week 6, Fuller made one solo tackle before exiting early in the fourth quarter of a 24–31 loss to the Houston Texans after sustaining an injury to his hand. He had an x-ray performed and was diagnosed with a fracture to his right thumb that subsequently sidelined him for the next five games (Weeks 7–11). He finished the season with 49 combined tackles (34 solo), two pass deflections, and one sack in 11 games and four starts. He received an overall grade of 70.1 from Pro Football Focus in 2019.

The Kansas City Chiefs finished the 2019 NFL season first in the AFC West with a 12–4 record and clinched a first-round bye. On January 12, 2020, Fuller made one solo tackle as the Chiefs defeated the Houston Texans 51–31 in the Divisional Round. The following week, they appeared in the AFC Championship Game and defeated the Tennessee Titans 35–24 to advance to the Super Bowl. On February 2, 2020, Fuller appeared in Super Bowl LIV and recorded four combined tackles (three solo), made two pass deflections, and sealed the Chiefs' 31–20 victory against the San Francisco 49ers after intercepting a pass thrown by Jimmy Garoppolo to wide receiver Deebo Samuel with 68 seconds remaining in the game. He earned the first and only Super Bowl ring of his career.

=== Washington Football Team / Commanders (second stint) ===
==== 2020 ====
On March 16, 2020, the Washington Redskins signed Fuller to a four–year, $40.00 million contract that included $23.50 million guaranteed, $13.50 million guaranteed upon signing, and an initial signing bonus of $12.50 million. He was signed to possibly start at outside cornerback following the departures of Josh Norman, Dominique Rodgers-Cromartie, and Quinton Dunbar.

Throughout training camp, Fuller competed against Ronald Darby, Fabian Moreau, Aaron Colvin, Jimmy Moreland for a starting role. Head coach Ron Rivera named Fuller and Ronald Darby as the starting cornerbacks to begin the season.

He was inactive for the first two games (Weeks 1–2) of the season due to a knee injury. On October 4, 2020, Fuller made one solo tackle, two pass deflections, and a career-high two interceptions off passes by Lamar Jackson during a 17–31 loss to the Baltimore Ravens. The following week, he recorded four solo tackles, made two pass deflections, and intercepted a pass by Jared Goff to wide receiver Cooper Kupp during a 10–30 against the Los Angeles Rams in Week 5. In Week 6, Fuller had one pass deflection and had his third consecutive game with an interception after picking off a pass attempt by Daniel Jones to wide receiver Darius Slayton as the Commanders lost 19–20 at the New York Giants. In Week 10, he collected a season-high eight combined tackles (six solo) during a 27–30 loss at the Detroit Lions. He finished the 2020 NFL season with 50 combined tackles (38 solo), 11 pass deflections, and a career-high four interceptions in 14 games and 14 starts. He received an overall grade of 67.2 from Pro Football Focus in 2021.

==== 2021 ====
He entered training camp projected to be the No. 1 starting cornerback under defensive coordinator Jack Del Rio, following the departure of Ronald Darby. Head coach Ron Rivera named him the No. 1 starting cornerback to start the season and paired him with William Jackson III.

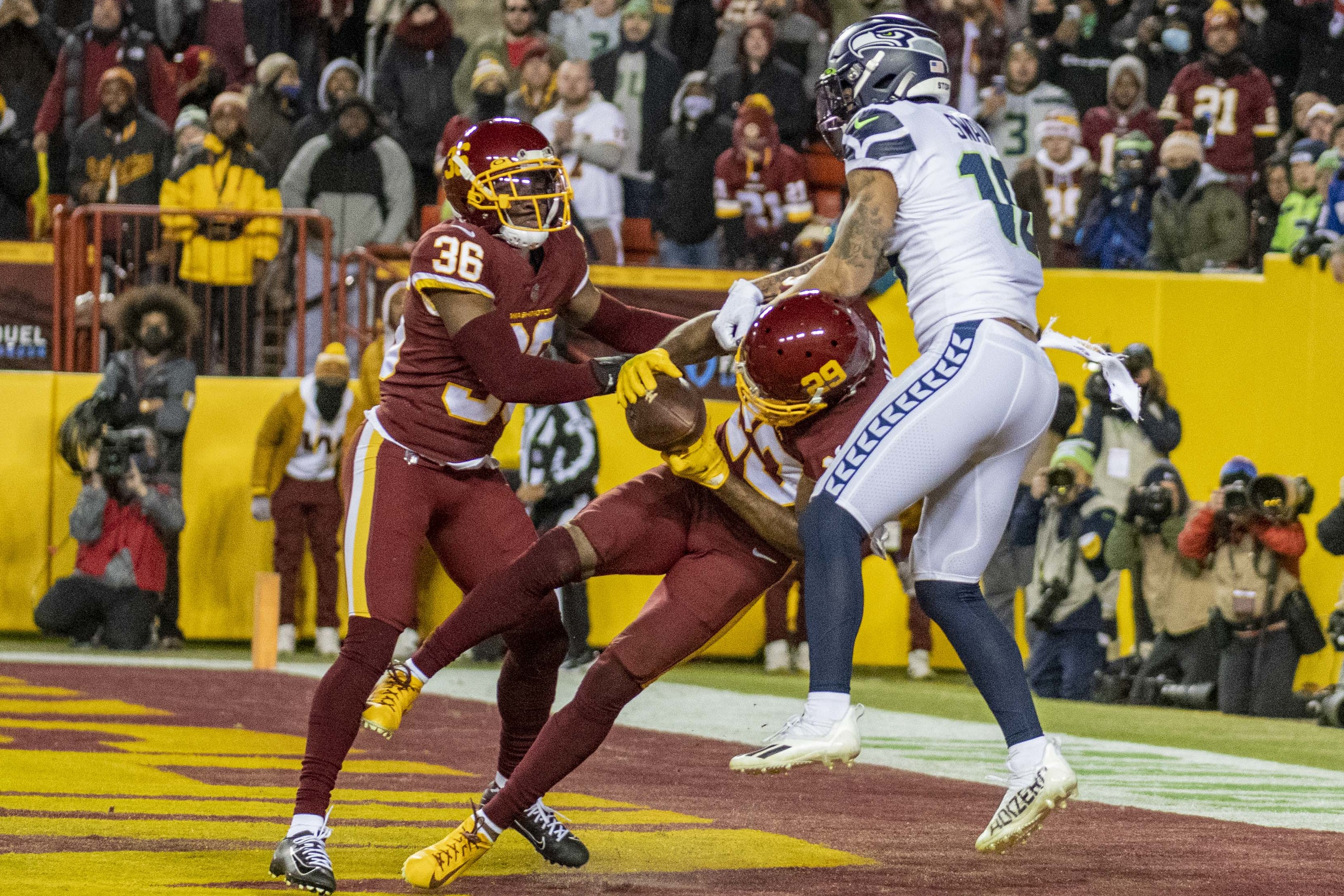
Fuller gets an interception against the Seattle Seahawks in 2021.

In Week 3, Fuller collected a season-high ten combined tackles (seven solo) during a 21–43 loss at the Buffalo Bills. On October 7, 2021, Fuller made seven solo tackles, a pass deflection, and had his only interception of the season on a pass by Patrick Mahomes to wide receiver Tyreek Hill during a 31–13 loss against the Kansas City Chiefs. On November 29, 2021, Fuller had one solo tackle, set a season-high with three pass deflections, and sealed a 15–17 win against the Seattle Seahawks by intercepting a pass by Russell Wilson on a two-point conversion left with 15 seconds left in the game. On December 14, 2021, he was placed on the COVID-19/reserve list. On December 24, 2021, he was removed from the COVID-19/reserve list and added back to the active roster after he was inactive for a 17–27 loss at the Philadelphia Eagles in Week 15. He finished the 2021 NFL season with 77 combined tackles (64 solo), 11 pass deflections, one interception, and one sack in 16 games and 16 starts. He received an overall grade of 81.5 from Pro Football Focus in 2021.

==== 2022 ====
He returned as the Commanders' starting cornerback alongside William Jackson III. On September 18, 2022, Fuller made four combined tackles (two solo) and set a season-high three pass deflections during a 27–36 loss at the Detroit Lions. The following week, he collected a season-high six combined tackles (five solo) and made one pass deflection as the Commanders were routed 8–24 by the Philadelphia Eagles. On November 20, 2022, Fuller made four combined tackles (two solo), a pass deflection, and intercepted a pass by Davis Mills to wide receiver Brandin Cooks and returned it 37–yards for his first career touchdown during a 23–10 victory at the Houston Texans. The following week, he had two combined tackles (one solo), one pass deflection, and secured the Commanders' 19–13 victory against the Atlanta Falcons with an interception in the endzone on a pass thrown by Marcus Mariota to Cordarrelle Patterson with only 58 seconds remaining in the game in Week 12. On January 8, 2023, Fuller had only one tackle, made two pass deflections, and returned an interception thrown by Dak Prescott to wide receiver Noah Brown for a 29–yard touchdown as the Commanders routed the Dallas Cowboys 6–26. He started in all 17 games for the first time in his career and finished the 2022 NFL season with a total of 52 combined tackles (36 solo), 13 pass deflections, three interceptions, and a career-high two touchdowns.

==== 2023 ====
He entered training camp slated as the de facto No. 1 starting cornerback. Head coach Rob Rivera named him the No. 1 starting cornerback for the third consecutive season and paired him with Benjamin St-Juste. On September 24, 2023, he made eight combined tackles (two solo), set a season-high with three pass deflections, and intercepted a pass by Josh Allen to wide receiver Gabriel Davis during a 37–3 loss against the Buffalo Bills. In Week 6, he collected a season-high nine solo tackles, made two pass deflections, and intercepted a pass by Desmond Ridder to wide receiver Van Jefferson during a 24–16 win at the Atlanta Falcons. In Week 15, Fuller racked up a season-high 11 combined tackles (five solo) during a 20–28 loss at the Los Angeles Rams. He was inactive for the last two remaining games (Weeks 17–18) due to a knee injury. He finished the 2023 NFL season with 79 combined tackles (55 solo), nine pass deflections, and two interceptions in 15 games and 15 starts. Pro Football Focus had Fuller receive an overall grade of 83.1 in 2023.

=== Miami Dolphins ===
==== 2024 ====
On March 18, 2024, the Miami Dolphins signed Fuller to a two–year, $15 million contract that included a signing bonus of $10 million. He entered training camp projected to be the No. 2 starting cornerback, but faced competition from Kader Kohou. Head coach Mike McDaniel named him a starting cornerback to begin the season, alongside No. 1 starting cornerback Jalen Ramsey.

On September 22, 2024, Fuller made three combined tackles (two solo) and made one pass deflection before exiting in the second quarter of a 3–24 loss at the Seattle Seahawks after sustaining a concussion. He subsequently remained in concussion protocol and was inactive for the Dolphins' 12–31 loss to the Tennessee Titans in Week 4. In Week 7, he collected a season-high seven combined tackles (five solo) during a 10–16 loss at the Indianapolis Colts. In Week 10, Fuller made five combined tackles (four solo), a pass deflection, and a fumble recovery before exiting during the third quarter of a 23–15 victory at the Los Angeles Rams. Due to this incident being his second concussion in less than two months, Fuller was kept in concussion protocol and remained sidelined for three games (Weeks 11–13). He finished the 2024 NFL season with 50 combined tackles (37 solo), seven pass deflections, and one fumble recovery in 11 games and 11 starts. He received an overall grade of 66.2 from Pro Football Focus in 2024, ranking 75th among 222 qualifying cornerbacks.

==== 2025 ====
On February 14, 2025, the Miami Dolphins officially released Fuller.

=== Detroit Lions ===
On October 14, 2025, Fuller signed with the Detroit Lions' practice squad. On October 27, he was released by the Lions.

== Personal life ==
Fuller's three older brothers, Vincent, Corey and Kyle, all played college football at Virginia Tech and in the NFL as well.
