= Corey Fuller (wide receiver) =

American football player (born 1990)

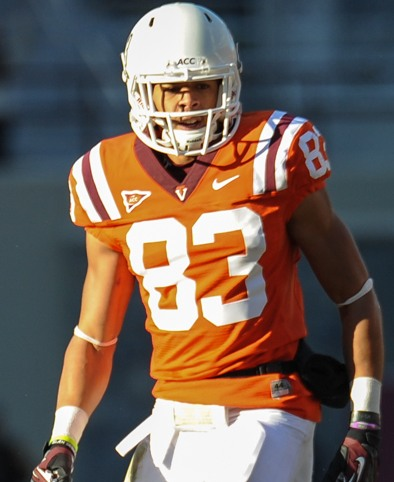
- Fuller with the Virginia Tech Hokies in 2012

Carolina Panthers
- Title: College scout

Personal information
- Born: June 28, 1990 (age 36); Baltimore, Maryland, U.S.
- Listed height: 6 ft 2 in (1.88 m)
- Listed weight: 204 lb (93 kg)

Career information
- High school: Woodlawn (Baltimore)
- College: Virginia Tech
- NFL draft: 2013: 6th round, 171st overall pick

Career history

Playing
- Detroit Lions (2013–2016); New Orleans Saints (2016–2017)

Operations
- Virginia Tech Hokies (2020) Assistant director of player personnel; Carolina Panthers (2021) Scouting assistant; Carolina Panthers (2022–present) Area scout

Career NFL statistics
- Receptions: 18
- Receiving yards: 288
- Receiving touchdowns: 1
- Stats at Pro Football Reference

Corey Alexander Fuller (born June 23, 1990) is an American former professional football player who was a wide receiver in the National Football League (NFL). He is currently a college scout for the NFL's Carolina Panthers. He played college football for the Virginia Tech Hokies and was selected by the Detroit Lions in the sixth round of the 2013 NFL draft. He was also a member of the New Orleans Saints.

== Early life ==
Fuller attended Woodlawn High School in Baltimore, Maryland. He lettered two seasons in football as a quarterback, and was a Nike indoor track All-American as a senior. He won first-team all-state indoor and outdoor track honors as a senior, and was an AAU National Champion as a member of the Baltimore City AAU team his final season.

== College career ==
=== Track and field ===
Fuller enrolled at the University of Kansas in 2008 on a track and field scholarship.

Fuller competed in the 100 meters, triple jump and long jump in his two years at Kansas. He had a very successful freshman season, finishing second in the triple jump at both the Kansas and Drake Relays. He also placed in the top three in six of the eight indoor meets in which he competed in 2009, and had the team’s top triple jump in the outdoor season as a sophomore and third-best 100-meter time.

Personal bests

Event	Time (seconds)	Venue	Date
100 meters	10.5	Fayetteville, Florida	April 20, 2010

Event	Mark (meters)	Venue	Date
Long Jump	6.63	Lawrence, Kansas	January 8, 2010
Triple jump	15.19	Ames, Iowa	February 27, 2010

=== Football ===
Fuller decided to transfer to Virginia Tech in fall 2010 where his brother Vincent Fuller had played and his younger brother Kyle Fuller was a current player, and walked-on to the football team, while sitting out the 2010 season. After recording only two receptions for 19 yards in 2011, Fuller became a full-time starter in his final season. He played in all 13 games, making eight starts, and recorded 43 receptions for 815 yards and six touchdowns.

== Professional playing career ==
Pre-draft measurables
Height	Weight	Arm length	Hand span	40-yard dash	10-yard split	20-yard split	20-yard shuttle	Three-cone drill	Broad jump	Bench press
6 ft 2 1/4 in (1.89 m)	204 lb (93 kg)	33 1/4 in (0.84 m)	9 1/2 in (0.24 m)	4.37 s	1.55 s	2.60 s	4.48 s	7.17 s	10 ft 0 in (3.05 m)	12 reps
All values from NFL Combine, except shuttle and 3-cone, which are from Virginia Tech's Pro Day.

=== Detroit Lions ===
Fuller was selected by the Detroit Lions in the sixth round, 171st overall in the 2013 NFL draft. He was cut by the Lions on August 31, 2013, but was assigned to the practice roster the next day. He spent the entire 2013 season on the practice squad.

On August 30, 2014, Corey made the Lions 53-man roster. On September 8, 2014, Fuller made his NFL debut, playing 15 snaps. Fuller was active in Week 1 ahead of Kevin Ogletree and Ryan Broyles. On October 19 against the New Orleans Saints, Fuller scored his first NFL touchdown, making a leaping grab of a 5-yard pass from Matthew Stafford. The touchdown proved to be the game-winner in a 24–23 comeback win for Detroit.

Fuller had offseason foot surgery in June 2016 and was placed on the PUP list to start the season. He was activated off the PUP list on November 8, 2016 prior to Week 10. He was released by the Lions on November 22, 2016 and was signed to the practice squad the next day.

=== New Orleans Saints ===
On December 19, 2016, Fuller was signed by the New Orleans Saints off the Lions' practice squad. He was placed on injured reserve on September 2, 2017. He was released by the Saints on November 6, 2017.

== Post-playing career ==
Following his NFL career, he served as a graduate assistant coach with the Central Michigan Chippewas in 2018.

Fuller returned to his alma mater in July 2020 after Virginia Tech announced he was hired as an assistant director of player personnel.

In June 2021, the Carolina Panthers announced that Fuller was hired as a scouting assistant. On July 29, 2022, the Panthers promoted him to their West Coast area scout.

== Personal life ==
Fuller's brothers all also played college football at Virginia Tech. His older brother, Vincent, is a retired NFL safety who spent the majority of his career with the Tennessee Titans. His younger brother, Kyle, is a cornerback, who was selected by the Chicago Bears in the first round of the 2014 NFL draft. His youngest brother, Kendall, is also a cornerback who was selected by the Washington Redskins in the third round of the 2016 NFL draft.
