= Kyle Fuller =

American football player (born 1992)

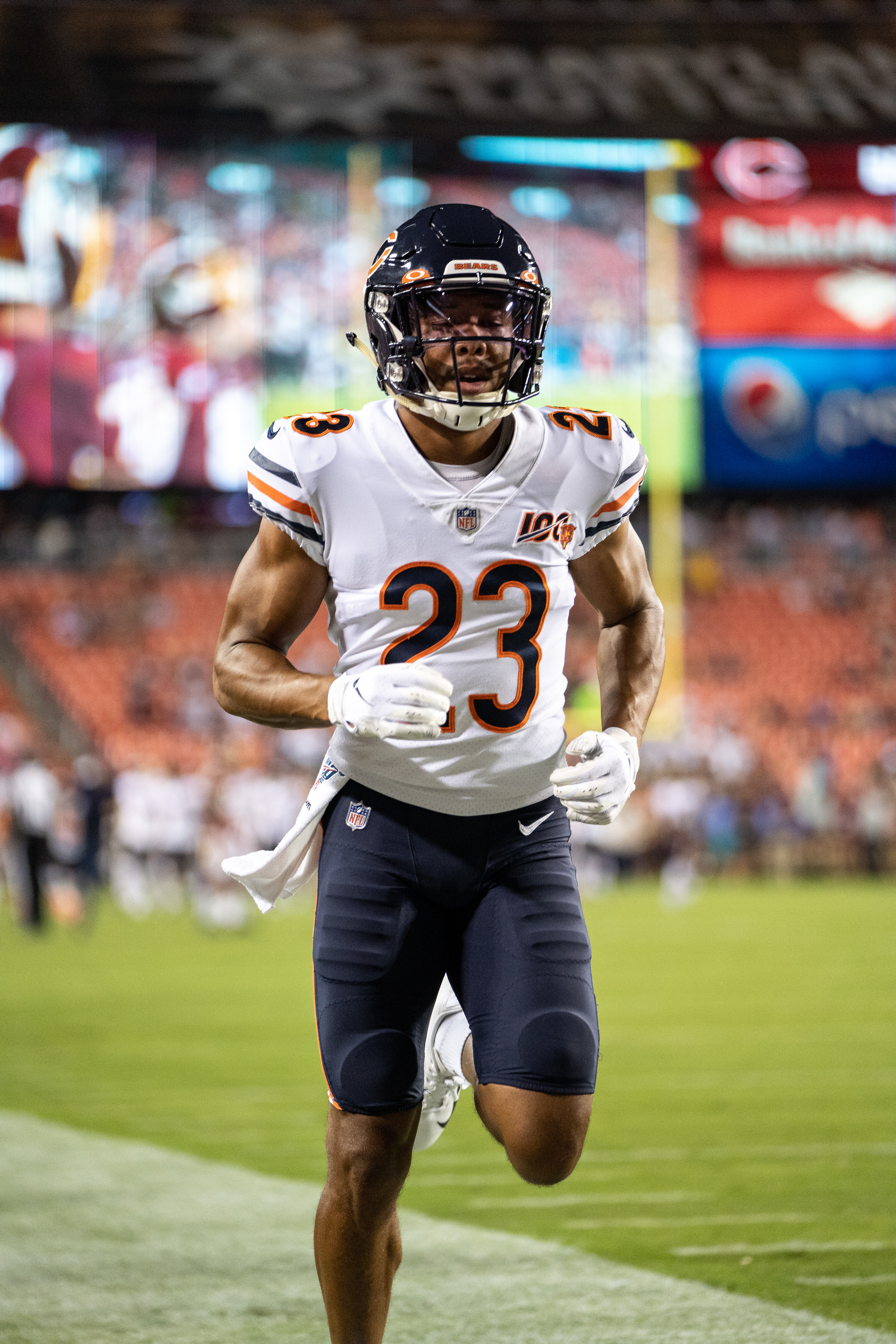
- Fuller with the Chicago Bears in 2019

No. 23, 18
- Position: Cornerback

Personal information
- Born: February 16, 1992 (age 34); Baltimore, Maryland, U.S.
- Listed height: 5 ft 11 in (1.80 m)
- Listed weight: 190 lb (86 kg)

Career information
- High school: Mount Saint Joseph (Baltimore)
- College: Virginia Tech (2010–2013)
- NFL draft: 2014: 1st round, 14th overall pick

Career history
- Chicago Bears (2014–2020); Denver Broncos (2021); Baltimore Ravens (2022)

Awards and highlights
- First-team All-Pro (2018); 2× Pro Bowl (2018, 2019); NFL interceptions co-leader (2018); PFWA All-Rookie Team (2014); Second-team All-American (2013); Second-team All-ACC (2011); Third-team All-ACC (2013)

Career NFL statistics
- Total tackles: 444
- Forced fumbles: 4
- Pass deflections: 86
- Interceptions: 19
- Stats at Pro Football Reference

Kyle Brandon Fuller (born February 16, 1992) is an American former professional football player who was a cornerback in the National Football League (NFL). He was selected by the Chicago Bears in the first round of the 2014 NFL draft and played college football for the Virginia Tech Hokies.

== Early life ==
A native of Baltimore, Maryland, Fuller attended Mount Saint Joseph High School, where he played high school football. He recorded one interception his senior year, and played in the Maryland Crab Bowl, an all-star game, despite missing most of his season with a finger injury. He had four interceptions as a junior, returning two of those for touchdowns. He also had a punt return touchdown and kick return score that season.

Fuller was also on the school's track & field team, where he competed as a sprinter and jumper. He won the long jump at the 2010 Woodlawn Warrior Invitational, with a personal-best mark of 6.41 meters. At the 2010 IAAM-MIAA Champs, he took fifth in the 300-meter dash, clocking at 37.98 seconds.

Considered a three-star recruit by ESPN.com, Fuller was listed as the No. 43 cornerback in the nation in 2010.

== College career ==
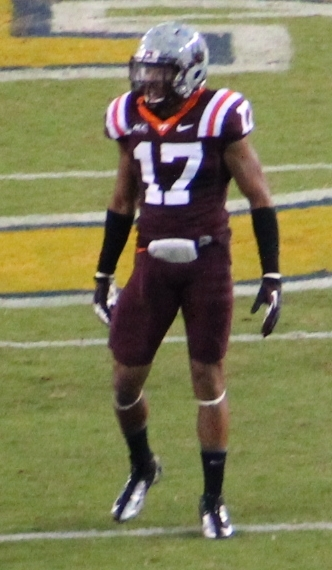
Fuller with Virginia Tech in 2013

Fuller started seven games in 2010 as a true freshman, primarily in the Hokies’ nickel defense. He recorded 32 tackles, four for a loss, broke up six passes and forced a fumble. In 2011, as a second-team All-Atlantic Coast Conference (ACC) selection at corner, he started all 14 games at two different positions. He started at nickelback/whip linebacker for seven games and corner for the other seven games. He played over 1,000 snaps on defense and 100 on special teams. He recorded 65 tackles, a team-high 14.5 tackles for loss and 4.5 sacks on the season. He also added seven pass breakups, two interceptions, five quarterback hurries, a forced fumble and a fumble recovery. In 2012, as honorable mention All-ACC at corner, he started all 13 games and recorded 52 tackles, including three for loss, two interceptions and five pass breakups. In 2013, he was one of the Hokies’ four permanent captains. He was named a third-team All-ACC selection, and played in nine games, making eight starts and missing the team's final four games due to injury. He recorded 24 tackles, two interceptions and 10 pass breakups in his final season.

== Professional career ==
=== Pre-draft ===
Fuller attended the NFL Scouting Combine and performed all of the combine drills. On March 19, 2014, Fuller participated at Virginia Tech's pro day, but opted to stand on his combine numbers and only performed positional drills. He was projected to be a first round pick by NFL draft experts and scouts. Fuller was ranked as the top cornerback prospect in the draft by NFL draft analyst Mike Mayock, was ranked the third best cornerback by DraftScout.com, and was ranked the sixth best cornerback by Sports Illustrated.

External videos
- Kyle Fuller's NFL Combine Workout

Pre-draft measurables
Height	Weight	Arm length	Hand span	40-yard dash	10-yard split	20-yard split	20-yard shuttle	Three-cone drill	Vertical jump	Broad jump	Bench press
5 ft 11 3/4 in (1.82 m)	190 lb (86 kg)	32 7/8 in (0.84 m)	9 3/8 in (0.24 m)	4.49 s	1.50 s	2.61 s	4.19 s	6.90 s	38.5 in (0.98 m)	10 ft 8 in (3.25 m)	12 reps
All values from NFL Combine

=== Chicago Bears ===
The Chicago Bears selected Fuller in the first round (14th overall) of the 2014 NFL draft. He was the second cornerback selected in the draft, behind Justin Gilbert (eighth overall, Cleveland Browns).

External videos
- Chicago Bears select Kyle Fuller No. 14

==== 2014 ====
On May 14, 2014, the Chicago Bears signed Fuller to a four–year, $9.68 million rookie contract that included a signing bonus of $5.36 million.

Head coach Marc Trestman named Fuller the third cornerback on the Bears' depth chart to start the regular season, behind Tim Jennings and Charles Tillman.

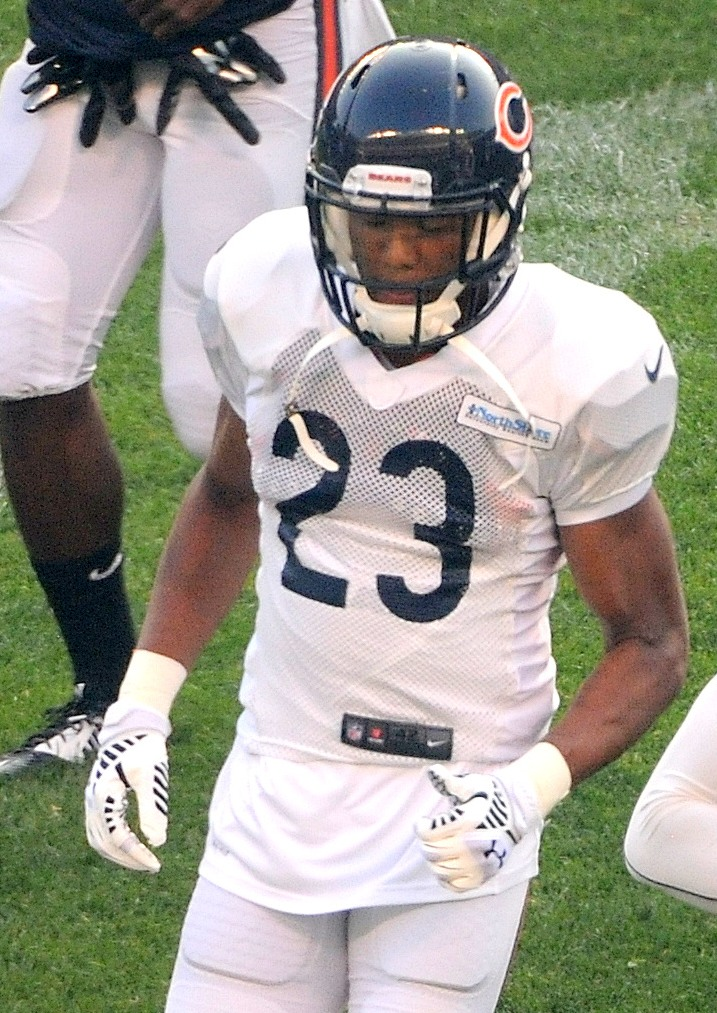
Fuller with the Bears in 2019

He made his professional regular season debut in the Bears' season-opener against the Buffalo Bills and recorded five combined tackles in their 23–20 loss. On September 14, 2014, Fuller made a season-high seven combined tackles, two pass deflections, and two interceptions during a 28–20 victory at the San Francisco 49ers on Sunday Night Football. He made his first career interception off a pass by quarterback Colin Kaepernick, that was intended for wide receiver Michael Crabtree, and returned it for a 20-yard gain in the fourth quarter. He became the first Bears' rookie to record two picks in a game since Chris Harris in 2005. He was named the NFC Defensive Player of the Week and became the first Bears' rookie defensive back to receive the award since Mark Carrier in 1990. In Week 3, Fuller earned his first career start after Charles Tillman sustained a triceps injury and was placed on injured reserve. He recorded seven combined tackles, two pass deflections, forced two fumbles, and made an interception as the Bears defeated the New York Jets 27–19 on Monday Night Football. He became the first NFL player in 20 years to record three interceptions and two forced fumbles in their first three games. In Week 13, he collected a season-high seven solo tackles and broke up a pass during a 34–17 loss at the Detroit Lions. On December 29, 2014, the Bears fired Trestman after they finished with a 5–11 record in 2014. He finished his rookie season in 2014 with 64 combined tackles (51 solo), ten pass deflections, four interceptions, and three forced fumbles in 16 games and 14 starts. He was named to the PFWA All-Rookie Team.

==== 2015 ====
Fuller entered training camp slated as a starting cornerback. Head coach John Fox officially named Fuller a starting cornerback to start the regular season, opposite Tracy Porter. On October 18, 2015, Fuller collected a season-high eight combined tackles during a 37–34 loss at the Lions. In Week 8, he made two combined tackles, a season-high two pass deflections, and intercepted a pass by quarterback Teddy Bridgewater in the Bears' 23–20 loss to the Minnesota Vikings. He started all 16 games and recorded 55 combined tackles (47 solo), nine pass deflections, and two interceptions. Fuller struggled through the early portion of the season, which included being responsible for two major defensive pass interference penalties, raising the possibility of being moved to safety. He eventually improved as the year progressed.

==== 2016 ====
Throughout training camp, Fuller dealt with a knee injury. On August 18, 2016, he underwent arthroscopic knee surgery to repair his knee injury. On September 28, 2016, the Bears placed Fuller on injured reserve after being inactive for the first three games while recovering from knee surgery. On November 30, 2016, Fuller returned to practice, but was not added to the active roster and remained on injured reserve for the entire 2016 season.

==== 2017 ====
On April 30, 2017, the Chicago Bears opted not to exercise the fifth–year option on Fuller's rookie contract.

Throughout training camp, he competed to be a starting cornerback against Marcus Cooper and Prince Amukamara. Head coach John Fox named Fuller the third cornerback on the depth chart to start the regular season, behind Cooper and Amukamara.

Fuller started in the Bears' season-opener against the Atlanta Falcons after Prince Amukamara injured his ankle during the preseason and was inactive for the first two regular-season games. Fuller recorded six combined tackles and broke up a pass in their 23–17 loss. In Week 5, he earned the start after Marcus Cooper was unable to play due to a back injury. Defensive coordinator Vic Fangio chose to retain Fuller as a starting cornerback for the rest of the season. On December 3, 2017, Fuller collected a season-high seven combined tackles, two pass deflections, and intercepted a pass by quarterback Jimmy Garoppolo during a 15–14 loss to the 49ers in Week 13. He had a career year in 2017, starting all 16 games recording 69 combined tackles (61 solo), a career-high 22 pass deflections, and two interceptions. He earned an overall grade of 84.3 from Pro Football Focus (PFF), which ranked 21st among all qualifying cornerbacks in 2017.

==== 2018 ====
On March 7, 2018, the Chicago Bears placed the transition tag on Fuller which was a fully-guaranteed one–year, $12.97 million contract.

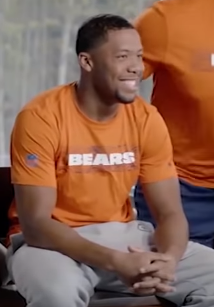
Fuller with the Bears in 2018

On March 16, 2018, the Green Bay Packers extended a four–year, $56 million contract with $18 million guaranteed offer to Fuller as a restricted free agent. The same day, the Chicago Bears chose to match the offer by the Green Bay Packers and signed Fuller to a four–year, $56 million contract extension that included $19 million guaranteed upon signing and an initial signing bonus of $18 million.

Fuller's 2018 season opened on a disappointing note when he dropped a potential game-sealing interception against the Packers, who eventually scored on the drive to win 24–23; after the game, he commented, "All I got to say is I got to catch it." In Weeks 6 and 7 against the Miami Dolphins and New England Patriots, he recorded three total interceptions, two off Brock Osweiler and once off Tom Brady. The two picks in Miami marked the first time that a Bear recorded two interceptions in a game since Fuller's performance against the 49ers in 2014.

During the remainder of the regular season, he recorded four more interceptions against Nathan Peterman of the Bills, Matthew Stafford of the Lions, Eli Manning of the New York Giants, and Jared Goff of the Los Angeles Rams. Fuller finished the season with 55 tackles, 21 passes defended, and shared a league-leading seven interceptions with Xavien Howard and Damontae Kazee. He received an overall grade of 81.4 from PFF in 2018, which ranked as the 7th highest grade among all qualifying cornerbacks in 2018.

On December 18, Fuller was selected to his first Pro Bowl. He was later also named to first-team All-Pro along with teammates Khalil Mack, Eddie Jackson, and Tarik Cohen.

==== 2019 ====
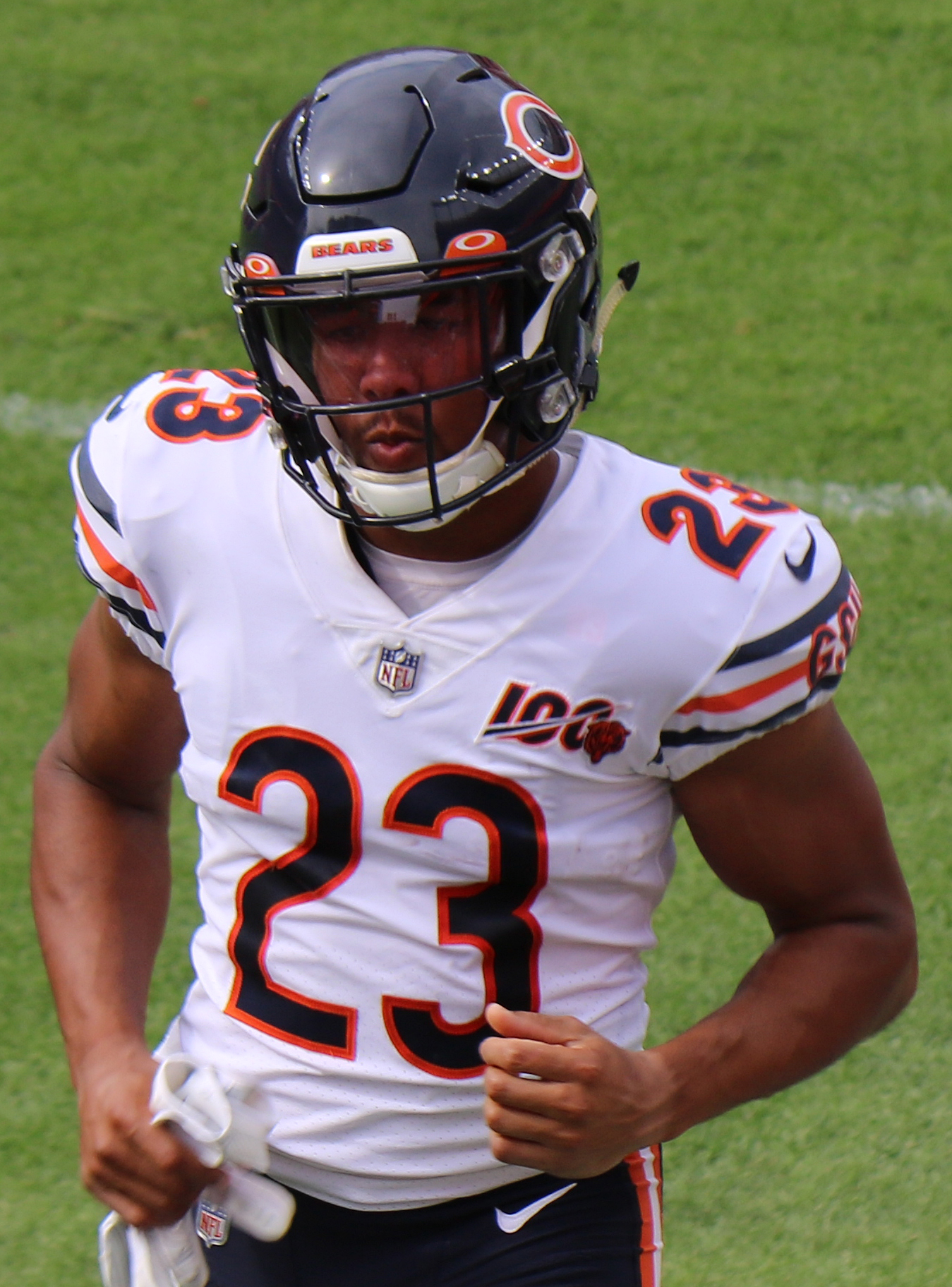
Fuller in 2019

In Week 2 against the Denver Broncos, Fuller made his first interception of the season off a pass from Joe Flacco that was intended for Emmanuel Sanders in the 16–14 win. In Week 3 against the Washington Redskins, Fuller intercepted a pass from Case Keenum in the 31–15 win. In Week 8 against the Los Angeles Chargers, Fuller recorded a team high 7 tackles and made an interception off Philip Rivers in the 17–16 loss.

Fuller ended the 2019 season with three interceptions and 12 pass breakups. His 82 combined tackles were a career best. On January 9, 2020, he was named to the 2020 Pro Bowl roster in place of an injured Jalen Ramsey after being voted as an alternate.

==== 2020 ====
In Week 1 against the Lions, Fuller recorded his first interception of the season off a pass thrown by Matthew Stafford during the 27–23 comeback victory. In Week 5 against the Tampa Bay Buccaneers on Thursday Night Football, Fuller forced a fumble on running back Ke'Shawn Vaughn which was recovered by teammate Robert Quinn during the 20–19 win.

On March 20, 2021, Fuller was released by the Bears.

=== Denver Broncos ===
On March 20, 2021, the Denver Broncos signed Fuller to a one-year, $9.50 million contract that included $9.00 million guaranteed upon signing.

Due to poor play, Fuller did not appear in the Broncos’ Week 8 matchup against Washington, after losing possible playing time in previous weeks to Nate Hairston and Patrick Surtain II.

Leading up to the 2021 trade deadline, it was widely speculated that the Broncos would trade away Fuller. However, he ultimately was not traded. He finished the season with 51 tackles, four pass deflections and no interceptions through 16 games and 10 starts.

=== Baltimore Ravens ===
On May 24, 2022, Fuller signed with the Baltimore Ravens. On September 14, the Ravens placed Fuller on injured reserve after suffering a torn ACL in the Week 1 game against the Jets.

== NFL career statistics ==
Legend
	Led the league
**Bold**	Career high

=== Regular season ===
Year	Team	Games		Tackles				Interceptions						Fumbles			
Year	Team	GP	GS	Cmb	Solo	Ast	Sck	PD	Int	Yds	Avg	Lng	TD	FF	FR	Yds	TD
2014	CHI	**16**	14	64	51	**13**	0.0	10	4	**81**	**20.2**	31	0	**3**	0	0	0
2015	CHI	**16**	**16**	55	47	8	0.0	9	2	24	12.0	15	0	0	0	0	0
2016	CHI	0	0	Did not play due to injury													
2017	CHI	**16**	**16**	69	61	8	0.0	**22**	2	0	0.0	0	0	0	0	0	0
2018	CHI	**16**	**16**	55	45	10	0.0	21	**7**	52	7.4	**35**	0	0	0	0	0
2019	CHI	**16**	**16**	**82**	**72**	10	0.0	12	3	37	12.3	29	0	0	0	0	0
2020	CHI	**16**	**16**	65	52	**13**	0.0	8	1	5	5.0	5	0	1	0	0	0
2021	DEN	**16**	10	51	40	11	0.0	4	0	0	0.0	0	0	0	0	0	0
2022	BAL	1	1	3	3	0	0.0	0	0	0	0.0	0	0	0	0	0	0
Career		113	105	444	371	73	0.0	86	19	199	10.5	35	0	4	0	0	0

=== Postseason ===
Year	Team	Games		Tackles				Interceptions						Fumbles			
Year	Team	GP	GS	Cmb	Solo	Ast	Sck	PD	Int	Yds	Avg	Lng	TD	FF	FR	Yds	TD
2018	CHI	**1**	**1**	**5**	**5**	0	0.0	**1**	0	0	0.0	0	0	0	0	0	0
2020	CHI	**1**	**1**	3	3	0	0.0	**1**	0	0	0.0	0	0	0	0	0	0
Career		2	2	8	8	0	0.0	2	0	0	0.0	0	0	0	0	0	0

== Personal life ==
Kyle's older brothers are former Virginia Tech Hokies football players, as well. His eldest brother, Vincent, is a retired NFL safety who spent the majority of his career with the Tennessee Titans. His older brother, Corey, is a retired wide receiver, who previously played for the Detroit Lions and New Orleans Saints. Their younger brother, Kendall, is a cornerback for the Detroit Lions. Kendall won Super Bowl LIV with the Kansas City Chiefs.
