= Vincent Fuller (American football) =

American football player (born 1982)

No. 22, 38
- Position: Safety

Personal information
- Born: August 3, 1982 (age 44); Baltimore, Maryland, U.S.
- Listed height: 6 ft 1 in (1.85 m)
- Listed weight: 192 lb (87 kg)

Career information
- High school: Woodlawn (Baltimore)
- College: Virginia Tech
- NFL draft: 2005: 4th round, 108th overall pick

Career history
- Tennessee Titans (2005–2010); Detroit Lions (2011); New England Patriots (2011)

Career NFL statistics
- Total tackles: 163
- Sacks: 2
- Forced fumbles: 2
- Fumble recoveries: 1
- Interceptions: 6
- Defensive touchdowns: 4
- Stats at Pro Football Reference

Vincent Fuller II (born August 3, 1982) is an American former professional football player who was a safety in the National Football League (NFL). He played college football for the Virginia Tech Hokies and was selected by the Tennessee Titans in the fourth round of the 2005 NFL draft.

== Early life ==
Fuller played high school football at Woodlawn High School.

== College career ==
During his career at Virginia Tech, Fuller totaled 142 tackles, a half-sack, 19 pass deflections, eight interceptions, three fumble recoveries, and returned a blocked field goal for a 74-yard touchdown, while playing in 50 games.

== Professional career ==
Pre-draft measurables
Height	Weight	40-yard dash	20-yard shuttle	Three-cone drill
6 ft 1 1/8 in (1.86 m)	189 lb (86 kg)	4.44 s	3.81 s	6.53 s
All values from Pro Day

Fuller was drafted by the Titans in the fourth round (108th overall) in the 2005 NFL draft. He was released by the Titans on September 3, 2011, in spite of offering to take a pay cut to stay on the roster.

On October 5, 2011, he signed with the Detroit Lions.

On December 21, 2011, he signed with the New England Patriots, after being released from IR by the Detroit Lions. He was released on December 23, 2011.

== NFL career statistics ==
Year	Team	GP	Tackles				Fumbles			Interceptions					
Year	Team	GP	Cmb	Solo	Ast	Sck	FF	FR	Yds	Int	Yds	Avg	Lng	TD	PD
2006	TEN	16	19	15	4	0.0	1	0	0	0	0	0.0	0	0	1
2007	TEN	16	30	27	3	1.0	0	1	0	2	137	68.5	76	2	4
2008	TEN	16	47	37	10	0.0	1	0	0	0	0	0.0	0	0	2
2009	TEN	13	34	27	7	1.0	0	0	0	3	71	23.6	45	2	7
2010	TEN	12	33	29	4	0.0	0	0	0	1	0	0.0	0	0	2
Career		73	163	135	42	2.0	2	1	0	6	208	34.6	76	4	16

== Post-playing career ==
Fuller attended the Fordham University School of Law and obtained his JD. Since 2017, he has worked for Fried, Frank, Harris, Shriver & Jacobson.

== Personal life ==
All of Fuller's younger brothers played college football at Virginia Tech as he did. His younger brother, Corey, was selected by the Detroit Lions in the sixth round of the 2013 NFL draft. His younger brother, cornerback Kyle, is a free agent and was selected by the Chicago Bears in the first round of the 2014 NFL draft. His youngest brother, cornerback Kendall, was drafted by the Washington Redskins with the 84th pick in the 2016 NFL draft.
