= Bashaud Breeland =

American football player (born 1992)

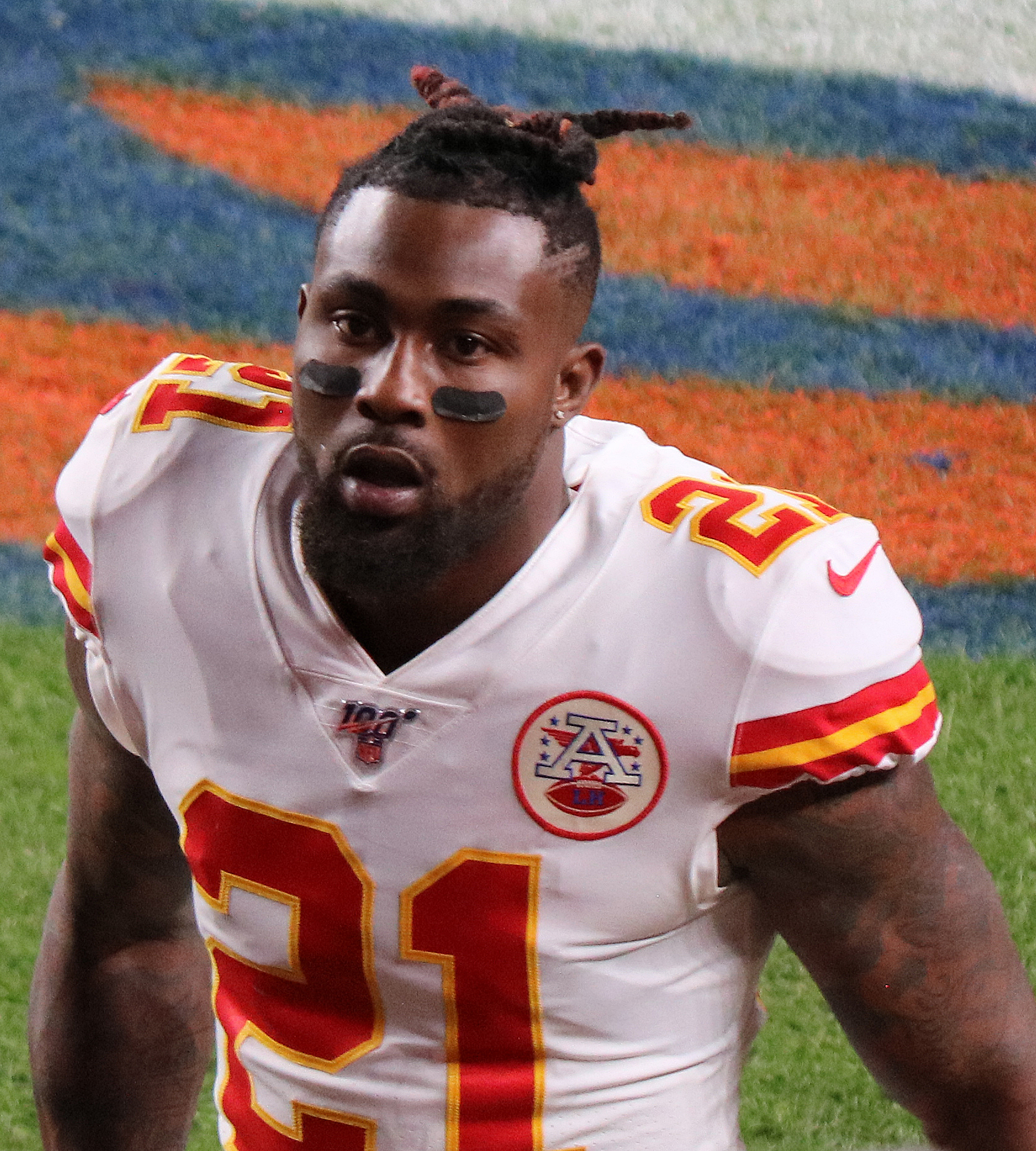
- Breeland with the Kansas City Chiefs in 2019

No. 26, 21
- Position: Cornerback

Personal information
- Born: January 30, 1992 (age 34); Allendale, South Carolina, U.S.
- Listed height: 5 ft 11 in (1.80 m)
- Listed weight: 195 lb (88 kg)

Career information
- High school: Allendale-Fairfax (Fairfax, South Carolina)
- College: Clemson (2010–2013)
- NFL draft: 2014: 4th round, 102nd overall pick

Career history
- Washington Redskins (2014–2017); Green Bay Packers (2018); Kansas City Chiefs (2019–2020); Minnesota Vikings (2021); Arizona Cardinals (2021)*
- * Offseason or practice squad member only

Awards and highlights
- Super Bowl champion (LIV); Second-team All-ACC (2013)

Career NFL statistics
- Total tackles: 439
- Sacks: 1.0
- Pass deflections: 86
- Interceptions: 16
- Forced fumbles: 10
- Fumble recoveries: 6
- Defensive touchdowns: 3
- Stats at Pro Football Reference

Bashaud Breeland (born January 30, 1992) is an American former professional football player who was a cornerback for eight seasons in the National Football League (NFL). He played college football for the Clemson Tigers, and was selected by the Washington Redskins in the fourth round of the 2014 NFL draft. He also played for the Green Bay Packers, Minnesota Vikings, and Kansas City Chiefs, having won Super Bowl LIV with the latter.

== Early life ==
Breeland attended Allendale-Fairfax High School in Fairfax, South Carolina, where he played football and basketball and ran track. In football, he played quarterback and defensive back. He was an All-state selection by The State and All-Atlantic Region team member by PrepStar. As a junior, he had 95 rushes for 789 yards with 12 touchdowns on offense, and totalled 76 tackles on defense. He led the Tigers to a 10–2 record as a senior after rushing for 1,270 yards and 15 touchdowns. He was also a starter on the basketball team.

In track & field, Breeland won the state title in the 400m hurdles as a sophomore and junior, and helped his team reach the state title in track as a junior. He captured two state titles at the 2010 SCHSL State Championships, winning the 110m hurdles (15.06s) and the 400m hurdles (54.78s). He earned a tenth-place finish in the 300m hurdles (40.69s) at the 2010 Bob Hayes Invitational. He was also timed at 4.41 in the 40-yard dash and posted a 280-pound bench press and 450-pound squat.

Regarded as a three-star recruit by Rivals.com, Breeland was regarded as the No. 22 safety in the nation and No. 6 player in South Carolina by Scout.com, as well as the No. 56 safety in the nation by ESPN.com. He chose to attend Clemson over Penn State, South Carolina, Tennessee, and Virginia Tech.

== College career ==
Breeland attended Clemson University from 2010 to 2013. He finished his career with 136 tackles, three sacks and six interceptions. Breeland entered the 2014 NFL draft after his junior season.

== Professional career ==
Pre-draft measurables
Height	Weight	Arm length	Hand span	40-yard dash	10-yard split	20-yard split	20-yard shuttle	Three-cone drill	Vertical jump	Broad jump	Bench press
5 ft 11 3/8 in (1.81 m)	197 lb (89 kg)	31 3/4 in (0.81 m)	9 in (0.23 m)	4.57 s	1.61 s	2.64 s	4.33 s	7.03 s	34.5 in (0.88 m)	10 ft 3 in (3.12 m)	11 reps
All values from NFL Combine/Clemson’s Pro Day

=== Washington Redskins ===
==== 2014 season ====
The Washington Redskins selected Breeland in the fourth round (102nd overall) of the 2014 NFL draft. He was the tenth cornerback drafted in 2014.

On May 16, 2014, the Redskins signed Breeland to a four-year, $2.70 million contract that includes a signing bonus of $486,000. Throughout training camp, Breeland competed for a roster spot as a backup cornerback against Tracy Porter, E. J. Biggers, Chase Minnifield, and Richard Crawford. Head coach Jay Gruden named Breeland the fifth cornerback on the depth chart to start the regular season, behind DeAngelo Hall, David Amerson, Biggers, and Porter.

He made his professional regular season debut and first career start in the Redskins’ season-opener at the Houston Texans, and made one solo tackle in the 17–6 loss. Breeland started the game at strong safety after Brandon Meriweather was suspended for the first two games of the season. On September 25, 2014, Breeland started at cornerback after Hall sustained a ruptured Achilles the previous game and was subsequently placed on injured reserve. The former made two solo tackles as the Redskins lost 45–14 against the New York Giants in Week 4. On October 17, Breeland recorded five solo tackles, a pass deflection, and made his first career interception during a 19–17 victory against the Tennessee Titans; Breeland intercepted a pass from quarterback Charlie Whitehurst originally intended for tight end Delanie Walker in the second quarter. He had a breakout performance in a Week 8 win against the Dallas Cowboys: he covered starting wide receiver Dez Bryant, limiting him to only three receptions; forced DeMarco Murray to fumble, which was recovered by safety Meriweather; and broke up a pass on fourth down, sealing the Redskins' overtime victory. In their Week 16 game against the Philadelphia Eagles, he intercepted quarterback Mark Sanchez late in the fourth quarter to help seal the Redskins' victory.

On December 31, Washington announced their decision to mutually part ways with defensive coordinator Jim Haslett. Breeland completed his rookie season with 66 combined tackles (57 solo), 14 pass deflections, two forced fumbles, and two interceptions in 16 games with 15 starts.

==== 2015 season ====
Breeland entered training camp slated as a starting cornerback and competed against DeAngelo Hall to retain the role. On July 31, 2015, the NFL suspended Breeland for the first game of the 2015 NFL season after he was cited by Virginia Commonwealth University police for possession of marijuana on August 11, 2014. On the same day, Breeland was injured during the second day of training camp during practice and was carted off the field. It was later announced that he sprained his MCL and was expected to recover in four-to-six weeks; he was not able to participate for the rest of training camp.

In Week 5, he recorded his first interception of the season against Atlanta Falcons' quarterback Matt Ryan. In Week 6, Breeland had a solid performance against the New York Jets, having recorded one interception, one forced fumble, and two fumble recoveries. He finished the 2015 season with 81 total tackles, two interceptions, 16 passes defended, and three forced fumbles.

==== 2016 season ====
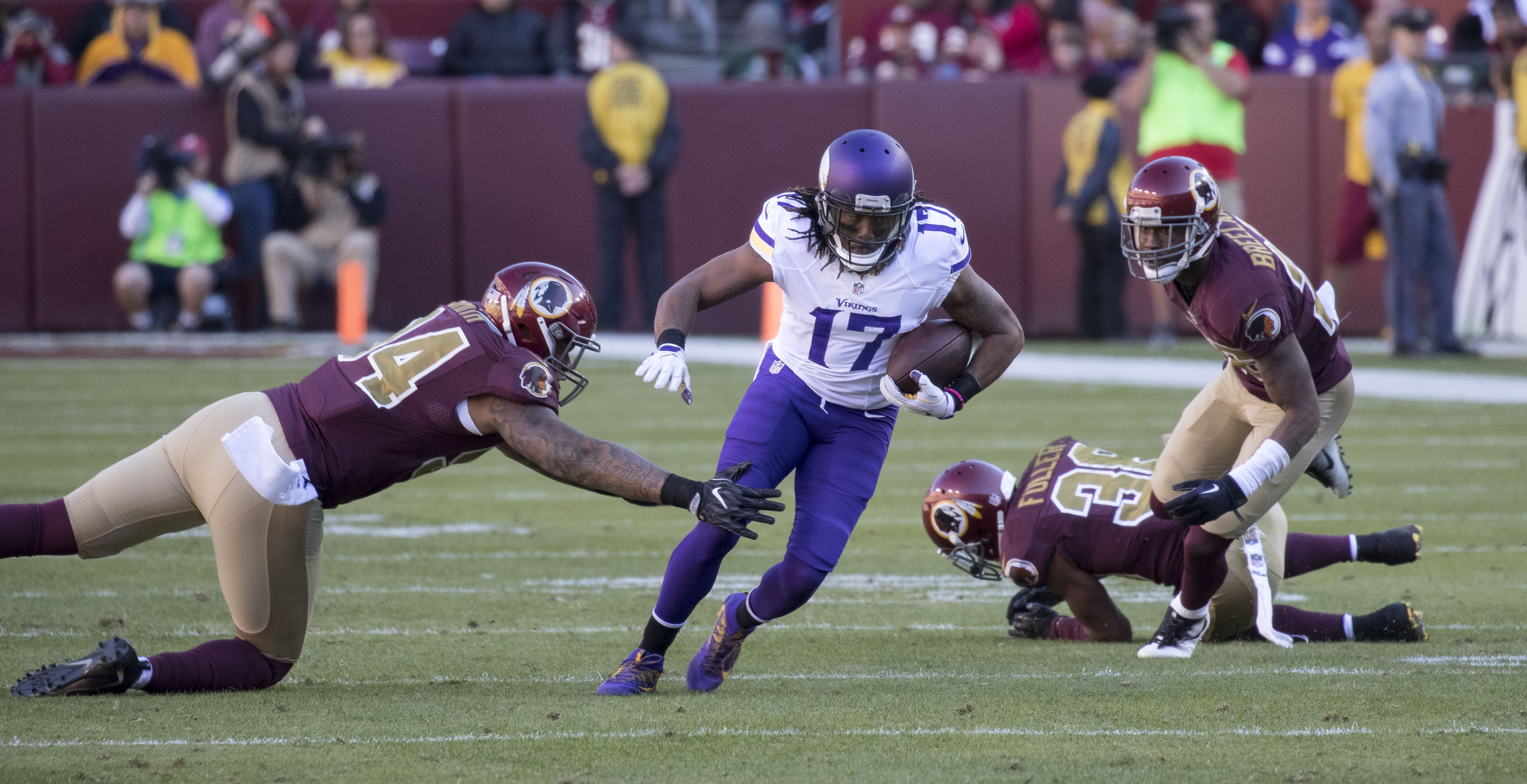
Breeland (right) playing against the Minnesota Vikings in 2016

Despite having a difficult time covering wide receiver Antonio Brown in their Week 1 loss to the Pittsburgh Steelers, Breeland recorded his first interception of the season against quarterback Ben Roethlisberger. In a Week 16 win against the Chicago Bears, he recorded two interceptions on quarterback Matt Barkley, which made him the first Redskins player since Fred Smoot (2001) to start his career recording multiple interceptions in three consecutive seasons. He finished the 2016 season with 73 total tackles, three interceptions, 11 passes defended, and two forced fumbles.

==== 2017 season ====
Breeland recorded the first interception of the 2017 season against backup quarterback Kellen Clemens in their Week 14 loss to the Los Angeles Chargers; he ran the ball 96 yards for a touchdown.

Following the season, Breeland became an unrestricted free agent. On March 16, 2018, Breeland agreed to terms with the Carolina Panthers on a three-year, $24 million contract, including $11 million in guaranteed money. However, he failed his physical after suffering an infected cut on his foot in the Dominican Republic; the contract was therefore voided and he became a free agent again.

=== Green Bay Packers ===
==== 2018 season ====
On September 25, 2018, the Green Bay Packers signed Breeland to a one-year, $880,000 contract that includes a signing bonus of $90,000. Breeland was signed after cornerback Davon House sustained a shoulder injury and was placed on injured reserve. Head coach Mike McCarthy named Breeland the fifth cornerback on the depth chart, behind Tramon Williams, Kevin King, Josh Jackson, and Jaire Alexander.

Breeland's first game as a Packer was a 17–31 loss to the New England Patriots in Week 9, after missing several weeks of play to learn the playbook. In Week 10 against the Miami Dolphins, Breeland recorded his first interception of the season off backup quarterback Brock Osweiler. He injured his groin in Week 11 against the Seattle Seahawks and missed the next two games. Breeland returned in the Week 14 game against the Atlanta Falcons, where he recorded a 22-yard pick-six off Falcons' quarterback Matt Ryan, while also having a fumble recovery in the same game that helped seal a 34–20 win for the Packers.

=== Kansas City Chiefs ===
==== 2019 season ====
On March 18, 2019, the Kansas City Chiefs signed Breeland to a one-year, $2 million contract that includes a signing bonus of $1.15 million. Head coach Andy Reid named Breeland a starting cornerback to begin the regular season, alongside former Redskins' teammate Kendall Fuller.

In Week 2 against the Oakland Raiders, Breeland intercepted Derek Carr in the end zone as the Chiefs won 28–10. In Week 4 against the Detroit Lions, Breeland recovered a fumble by running back Kerryon Johnson in the end zone and returned it 100 yards for a touchdown in the 34–30 win. Additionally, in Week 14, Breeland made a game-winning pass deflection against the Patriots on fourth down; the win allowed the Chiefs to clinch the AFC West. He finished the 2019 season with 48 total tackles, two interceptions, eight passes defended, and two fumble recoveries.

In Super Bowl LIV against the San Francisco 49ers, Breeland recorded a team-high seven tackles and intercepted a pass by quarterback Jimmy Garoppolo during the 31–20 win.

==== 2020 season ====
On April 14, 2020, the Chiefs signed Breeland to a one-year, $3 million contract that includes a signing bonus of $1.50 million. He was suspended the first four games of the 2020 season for violating the league's policy on substance abuse, and was placed on the reserve/suspended list on September 5. He was reinstated from suspension on October 6, and activated to the roster on October 10. Overall, he finished the 2020 season with 38 total tackles, two interceptions, nine passes defended, and one forced fumble.

=== Minnesota Vikings ===
Breeland signed with the Minnesota Vikings on June 8, 2021. He entered the 2021 season as a starting cornerback alongside Patrick Peterson. In Week 14, Breeland had eight tackles and intercepted quarterback Ben Roethlisberger in a 36–28 win over the Steelers. On December 18, Breeland was waived by the Vikings after getting into a verbal altercation with coaches and teammates at practice earlier that day. He finished the 2021 season with 63 total tackles, two interceptions, five passes defended, and two forced fumbles.

=== Arizona Cardinals ===
On January 4, 2022, Breeland was signed to the Arizona Cardinals' practice squad. His contract expired when the team's season ended on January 17.

== NFL career statistics ==
Year	Team	Games		Tackles				Interceptions						Fumbles	
Year	Team	GP	GS	Comb	Solo	Ast	Sck	PD	Int	Yds	Avg	Lng	TD	FF	FR
2014	WAS	16	15	66	57	9	0.0	14	2	0	0.0	0	0	2	0
2015	WAS	15	14	81	59	22	0.0	16	2	56	28.0	28	0	3	2
2016	WAS	14	14	73	62	11	1.0	11	3	32	10.7	26	0	2	0
2017	WAS	15	14	50	37	13	0.0	19	1	96	96.0	96	1	0	0
2018	GB	7	5	20	16	4	0.0	4	2	48	24.0	26	1	0	1
2019	KC	16	15	48	37	11	0.0	8	2	4	2.0	4	0	0	2
2020	KC	11	11	38	30	8	0.0	9	2	29	14.5	29	0	1	1
2021	MIN	13	13	55	38	17	0.0	5	2	26	13.0	18	0	2	0
Career		94	88	376	298	78	1.0	81	14	265	18.9	96	2	8	6

== Personal life ==
Breeland was arrested on April 28, 2020, for multiple charges, including resisting arrest, having alcohol in a motor vehicle with the seal broken, having an open container of beer or wine in a motor vehicle, possession of 28 grams or less of marijuana or 10 grams of hash, and driving without a license. The police officer who detained Breeland alleged that Breeland threw a “large blunt” into his car and he pushed the deputy out of the way and attempted to flee the officer before he was detained. Police found marijuana in the car as well as open bottles of beer and tequila. The morning after the arrest, he posted to his Twitter that the marijuana was thrown into his car, but quickly deleted the tweets. The arresting officer said that Breeland informed him that he was a “marijuana enthusiast”. Breeland was already facing a suspension for a failed drug test prior to the arrest. He pleaded guilty on October 2, 2020, and received a 30-day suspended jail sentence and $100 fine for each charge.

Breeland was arrested again on August 7, 2023, in Charlotte, North Carolina after police pulled him over and discovered the 2020 Mercedes Benz G550 SUV he was driving had been reported stolen in Florida. Officers searched the car and located a swath of concealed firearms, including multiple assault rifles and several handguns. According to the charging document, police also found copious amounts of drugs in the vehicle.

Breeland was arrested again on April 7, 2024, in Charlotte, North Carolina after a call concerning drug activity. Police found Breeland with a variety of drugs at the scene.
