= Dashaun Phillips =

American football player (born 1991)

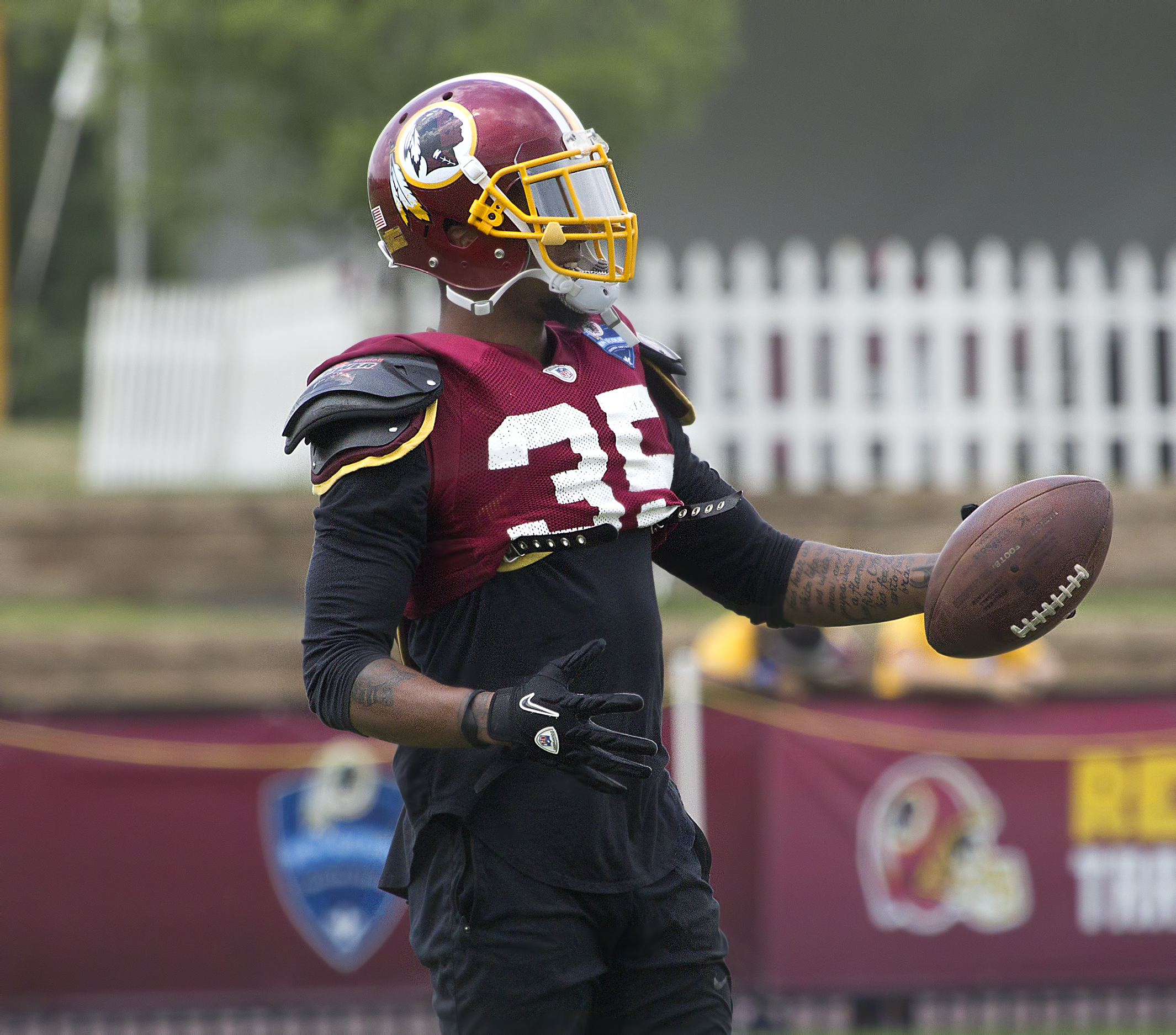
- Phillips with the Washington Redskins in 2016

No. 31, 32, 35, 38, 41
- Position: Cornerback

Personal information
- Born: January 3, 1991 (age 35); Dallas, Texas, U.S.
- Listed height: 5 ft 11 in (1.80 m)
- Listed weight: 186 lb (84 kg)

Career information
- High school: Duncanville (Duncanville, Texas)
- College: Tarleton State
- NFL draft: 2014: undrafted

Career history
- Dallas Cowboys (2014)*; New York Jets (2014–2015)*; Washington Redskins (2015–2016); Pittsburgh Steelers (2017–2018)*; Dallas Renegades (2020)
- * Offseason or practice squad member only

Career NFL statistics
- Total tackles: 14
- Fumble recoveries: 1
- Stats at Pro Football Reference

Dashaun Phillips (born January 3, 1991) is an American former professional football player who was a cornerback in the National Football League (NFL). He played college football for the Tarleton State Texans, and signed with the Dallas Cowboys as an undrafted free agent in 2014.

Phillips was also a member of the New York Jets, Washington Redskins, Pittsburgh Steelers, and Dallas Renegades.

== Early life ==
Phillips was born in 1991 in Duncanville, Texas as one of five children to a mother named Cassandra. His siblings include Zion, Asia, Tara, and Jack. Phillips graduated in 2008 from Duncanville High School where he played football as a defensive back. In high school football, Phillips earned several accolades including Most Valuable Player as well as 2008 Defensive Back of the Year in District 8-5A. He was also part of the District Championship team in 2008. During his senior year, Phillips was team captain. He lettered three years in both football and track.

== College career ==
Phillips committed to Tarleton State University. After redshirting in 2009, Phillips played the following year, recording 26 unassisted tackles out of a total of 44. He recorded 5 pass breakups and 1 forced fumble. During the 2011 season Phillips tied for No. 3 all-time in the school's history with most interceptions. He received the Lone Star Conference Defensive Player of the Year award and led the conference and team with 7 interceptions and 15 passes defended. He was named First-team All-LSC and Named First-team All-Super Region Four. In his final year Phillips recorded 19 unassisted tackles out of a total of 32 and recorded 8 pass breakups, 1 interception and 1 forced fumble. While attending Tarleton State, Phillips majored in kinesiology.

== Professional career ==
=== Dallas Cowboys ===
After going unselected in the 2014 NFL draft, Phillips signed with the Dallas Cowboys as a college free agent on May 12, 2014. He was waived on August 28.

=== New York Jets ===
Phillips signed with the practice squad of the New York Jets on October 7, 2014. On December 30, he signed a futures contract with the Jets.

The Jets waived/injured him on September 1, 2015. He was waived off the team's injured reserve with a settlement on September 5, 2015.

=== Washington Redskins ===
The Washington Redskins signed Phillips to their practice squad on September 15, 2015. He was promoted to the active roster on November 27 to replace Chris Culliver, who was placed on the team's injured reserve. On January 3, 2016, he left the last game of the regular season against the Dallas Cowboys with a severe neck injury. He was carted off and transported to a local hospital where he had feeling in all extremities.

Phillips was waived on November 12, 2016 and was re-signed to the practice squad three days later. He was promoted back to the active roster on December 2, 2016. On December 5, Phillips was once again released by the Redskins and re-signed to the practice squad. He was promoted back to the active roster on December 22, 2016.

=== Pittsburgh Steelers ===
On August 23, 2017, Phillips was traded to the Pittsburgh Steelers for Lucas Crowley. He was waived on September 2, 2017, and was signed to the Steelers' practice squad the next day. He signed a reserve/future contract with the Steelers on January 15, 2018.

On September 1, 2018, Phillips was released by the Steelers.

=== Dallas Renegades ===
In 2019, Phillips was selected by the Dallas Renegades in the 2020 XFL draft. He had his contract terminated when the league suspended operations on April 10, 2020.
