= 2015 Washington Redskins season =

NFL team season

- Owner: Daniel Snyder
- General manager: Scot McCloughan
- President: Bruce Allen
- Head coach: Jay Gruden
- Offensive coordinator: Sean McVay
- Defensive coordinator: Joe Barry
- Home stadium: FedExField

Results
- Record: 9–7
- Division place: 1st NFC East
- Playoffs: Lost Wild Card Playoffs (vs. Packers) 18–35
- All-Pros: OT Trent Williams (2nd team)
- Pro Bowlers: OT Trent Williams

Uniform
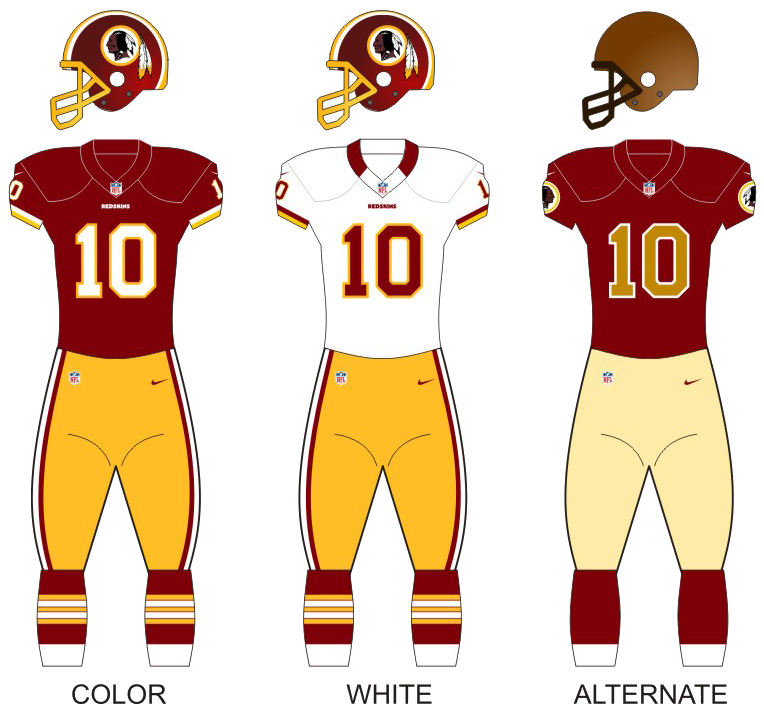

The 2015 season was the Washington Redskins' 84th in the National Football League (NFL), their second under head coach Jay Gruden and their first under general manager Scot McCloughan. Quarterback Robert Griffin III suffered a concussion during the second preseason game and consequently missed the rest of the preseason. Kirk Cousins was later named the starter for the season, and set multiple Redskins franchise records.

The Redskins improved from their 4–12 record from the previous season, going 9–7 and clinching the NFC East division title for the first time since 2012. However, they were defeated by the Green Bay Packers 35–18 in the Wild Card round of the playoffs.

This marks the last time they made the playoffs and won the NFC East title under the Redskins name before retiring both the name and banner in 2020 after years of keeping the controversial name.

== Draft ==
2015 Washington Redskins draft
Round	Selection	Player	Position	College
1	5	Brandon Scherff	Offensive tackle	Iowa
2	38	Preston Smith	Defensive end	Mississippi State
3	95	Matt Jones	Running back	Florida
4	105	Jamison Crowder	Wide receiver	Duke
4	112	Arie Kouandjio	Guard	Alabama
5	141	Martrell Spaight	Linebacker	Arkansas
6	181	Kyshoen Jarrett	Safety	Virginia Tech
6	182	Tevin Mitchel	Cornerback	Arkansas
6	187	Evan Spencer	Wide receiver	Ohio State
7	222	Austin Reiter	Center	South Florida

Draft trades

- The Redskins traded their original third-round selection (No. 69 overall) to the Seattle Seahawks in exchange for the Seahawks' third- (No. 95 overall), fourth- (No. 112 overall), fifth- (No. 167 overall), sixth- (No. 181 overall) round selections.
- The Redskins traded their fifth-round selection (No. 167 overall) acquired by Seahawks to the New Orleans Saints in exchange for the Saints' sixth-round selection (No. 187 overall) and sixth-round selection in the 2016 NFL draft.

== Staff ==
2015 Washington Redskins staff
Front office: Owner – Daniel Snyder; President – Bruce Allen; General manager – Scot McCloughan; Personnel Executive – Doug Williams; Vice President of Football Administration – Eric Schaffer; Director of Player Personnel – Scott Campbell; Director of Pro Personnel – Alex Santos; Director of Football Operations – Paul Kelly; Head coaches: Head coach – Jay Gruden; Offensive coaches: Offensive coordinator – Sean McVay; Quarterbacks – Matt Cavanaugh; Running backs – Randy Jordan; Wide receivers – Ike Hilliard; Tight ends – Wes Phillips; Offensive line – Bill Callahan; Assistant offensive line – Shane Day; Offensive quality control – Dave Ragone	Defensive coaches: Defensive coordinator – Joe Barry; Defensive line – Robb Akey; Linebackers – Kirk Olivadotti; Defensive backs – Perry Fewell; Defensive quality control – Chad Grimm; Defensive quality control – Aubrey Pleasant; Special teams coaches: Special teams coordinator – Ben Kotwica; Assistant special teams – Bradford Banta; Special teams assistant/special projects – Bret Munsey; Strength and conditioning: Director of player development – Malcolm Blacken; Head strength and conditioning – Mike Clark; Assistant strength and conditioning – Chad Englehart; Assistant strength and conditioning/skill development – Joe Kim

== Final roster ==
2015 Washington Redskins roster
Quarterbacks (QB): 8 Kirk Cousins; 10 Robert Griffin III; 16 Colt McCoy; Running backs (RB): 31 Matt Jones; 46 Alfred Morris; 25 Chris Thompson; 36 Darrel Young FB; 39 Pierre Thomas; Wide receivers (WR): 80 Jamison Crowder; 88 Pierre Garçon; 14 Ryan Grant; 11 DeSean Jackson; 19 Rashad Ross; Tight ends (TE): 85 Marcel Jensen; 86 Jordan Reed; 83 Alex Smith	Offensive linemen (OL): 68 Tom Compton T; 60 Brian de la Puente C/G; 74 Arie Kouandjio G; 67 Josh LeRibeus C; 61 Spencer Long G; 76 Morgan Moses T; 79 Ty Nsekhe T; 75 Brandon Scherff G; 71 Trent Williams T; Defensive linemen (DL): 92 Chris Baker DE; 64 Kedric Golston NT; 97 Jason Hatcher DE; 99 Ricky Jean Francois DE; 73 Frank Kearse DE; 98 Terrance Knighton NT	Linebackers (LB): 96 Houston Bates OLB; 51 Will Compton ILB; 59 Carlos Fields ILB; 54 Mason Foster ILB; 91 Ryan Kerrigan OLB; 93 Trent Murphy OLB; 56 Perry Riley ILB; 52 Keenan Robinson ILB; 94 Preston Smith OLB; Defensive backs (DB): 41 Will Blackmon CB; 26 Bashaud Breeland CB; 47 Quinton Dunbar CB; 22 Deshazor Everett CB; 38 Dashon Goldson FS; 23 DeAngelo Hall CB; 37 Jeremy Harris CB; 30 Kyshoen Jarrett SS; 20 Jeron Johnson SS; 35 Dashaun Phillips CB; Special teams (ST): 3 Dustin Hopkins K; 57 Nick Sundberg LS; 5 Tress Way P	Practice squad: 34 Mack Brown RB; 15 LaRon Byrd WR; 69 Takoby Cofield T; 95 Corey Crawford DE; 45 Ray Hamilton TE (PS/I); 72 Anthony Johnson DE; 66 Kamal Johnson NT; 13 Colin Lockett WR; 40 Derrick Mathews ILB; 62 Austin Reiter C; 48 Lynden Trail OLB; Reserve: 89 Derek Carrier TE (IR); 29 Chris Culliver CB (IR); 58 Junior Galette OLB (IR); -- James Gayle OLB (IR); 55 Adam Hayward ILB (IR); 24 Duke Ihenacho SS (IR); 53 Jackson Jeffcoat OLB (IR); 77 Shawn Lauvao G (IR); 78 Kory Lichtensteiger C (IR); 90 Stephen Paea DE (IR); 84 Niles Paul TE (IR); 82 Logan Paulsen TE (IR); 32 Silas Redd RB (IR); 12 Andre Roberts WR (IR); 50 Martrell Spaight ILB (IR); Rookies in italics 53 active, 16 reserve, 10 practice squad

== Preseason ==
Week	Date	Opponent	Result	Record	Venue	Recap
1	August 13	at Cleveland Browns	W 20–17	1–0	FirstEnergy Stadium	Recap
2	August 20	Detroit Lions	W 21–17	2–0	FedExField	Recap
3	August 29	at Baltimore Ravens	W 31–13	3–0	M&T Bank Stadium	Recap
4	September 3	Jacksonville Jaguars	L 16–17	3–1	FedExField	Recap

== Regular season ==
=== Schedule ===
Week	Date	Opponent	Result	Record	Venue	Recap
1	September 13	Miami Dolphins	**L** 10–17	0–1	FedExField	Recap
2	September 20	St. Louis Rams	**W** 24–10	1–1	FedExField	Recap
3	September 24	at **New York Giants**	**L** 21–32	1–2	MetLife Stadium	Recap
4	October 4	**Philadelphia Eagles**	**W** 23–20	2–2	FedExField	Recap
5	October 11	at Atlanta Falcons	**L** 19–25 (OT)	2–3	Georgia Dome	Recap
6	October 18	at New York Jets	**L** 20–34	2–4	MetLife Stadium	Recap
7	October 25	Tampa Bay Buccaneers	**W** 31–30	3–4	FedExField	Recap
8	Bye					
9	November 8	at New England Patriots	**L** 10–27	3–5	Gillette Stadium	Recap
10	November 15	New Orleans Saints	**W** 47–14	4–5	FedExField	Recap
11	November 22	at Carolina Panthers	**L** 16–44	4–6	Bank of America Stadium	Recap
12	November 29	**New York Giants**	**W** 20–14	5–6	FedExField	Recap
13	December 7	**Dallas Cowboys**	**L** 16–19	5–7	FedExField	Recap
14	December 13	at Chicago Bears	**W** 24–21	6–7	Soldier Field	Recap
15	December 20	Buffalo Bills	**W** 35–25	7–7	FedExField	Recap
16	December 26	at **Philadelphia Eagles**	**W** 38–24	8–7	Lincoln Financial Field	Recap
17	January 3	at **Dallas Cowboys**	**W** 34–23	9–7	AT&T Stadium	Recap

Note: Intra-division opponents are in bold text.

=== Game summaries ===
==== Week 1: vs. Miami Dolphins ====
Week One: Miami Dolphins at Washington Redskins – Game summary

Quarter	1	2	3	4	Total
**Dolphins**	0	7	0	10	**17**
Redskins	3	7	0	0	**10**

at FedExField, Landover, Maryland

- Date: September 13
- Game time: 1:00 p.m. EDT
- Game weather: Partly cloudy, 73 °F (23 °C)
- Game attendance: 76,512
- Referee: Walt Coleman
- TV announcers (CBS): Ian Eagle, Dan Fouts and Evan Washburn
- Recap, Gamebook

Game information

**First quarter**

- WAS – Kai Forbath 45-yard field goal, 7:39. Redskins 3–0. **Drive: 12 plays, 53 yards, 7:21.**

**Second quarter**

- WAS – Jordan Reed 4-yard pass from Kirk Cousins (Kai Forbath kick), 1:49. Redskins 10–0. **Drive: 17 plays, 88 yards, 8:49.**
- MIA – Rishard Matthews 3-yard pass from Ryan Tannehill (Andrew Franks kick), 0:27. Redskins 10–7. **Drive: 9 plays, 80 yards, 1:22.**

**Third quarter**

- MIA – Andrew Franks 22-yard field goal, 11:34. Tied 10–10. **Drive: 10 plays, 76 yards, 5:13.**

**Fourth quarter**

- MIA – Jarvis Landry 69-yard punt return (Andrew Franks kick), 10:22. Dolphins 17–10.

**Top passers**

- MIA – Ryan Tannehill – 22/34, 226 yards, TD
- WAS – Kirk Cousins – 21/31, 196 yards, TD, 2 INT

**Top rushers**

- MIA – Lamar Miller – 13 rushes, 53 yards
- WAS – Alfred Morris – 25 rushes, 121 yards

**Top receivers**

- MIA – Jordan Cameron – 4 receptions, 73 yards
- WAS – Pierre Garçon – 6 receptions, 74 yards

The Redskins kicked off their 2015 regular season by hosting the Miami Dolphins. After a Kai Forbath field goal put the Redskins up 3–0, they got the ball back, and newly minted starting quarterback Kirk Cousins threw a deep pass to DeSean Jackson. The ball was overthrown, and Jackson sustained a hamstring injury while stretching out to attempt to catch it. Early in the second quarter, Cousins was intercepted by Miami cornerback Brent Grimes at the Redskins' 25-yard line, continuing a trend from previous seasons of turnovers and ill-advised throws. Grimes returned the interception 11 yards to the 14-yard line, but the Dolphins failed to score any points off of the turnover. Near the end of the first half, with Washington still nursing a 3–0 lead, Cousins tossed a 4-yard touchdown pass to tight end Jordan Reed, putting the Redskins up 10–0. Miami scored right before halftime, with Ryan Tannehill throwing a 3-yard touchdown pass to receiver Rishard Matthews with 27 seconds remaining. Washington led 10–7 entering halftime.

Miami got the ball to begin the second half, and on third-and-7 from the Miami 45-yard line, Tannehill threw deep down the right sideline to former Pro Bowl tight end Jordan Cameron for a gain of 27. However, on third-and-4 from the Redskins' 22-yard line, inside of Miami kicker Andrew Franks' range, defensive end Jason Hatcher forced a Tannehill fumble that was bobbled back to the Miami 40 and recovered by Redskins rookie outside linebacker Preston Smith. The Redskins did not capitalize, however, losing two yards on an Alfred Morris run and two short Cousins passes. On their next possession, Washington drove to the Miami 22-yard line—easily inside Forbath's range—but three consecutive penalties pushed them back 24 yards and forced a punt, squandering a valuable chance to extend the lead. On the ensuing drive, Franks converted a 22-yard field goal attempt to tie the score at 10–10 entering the fourth quarter. The Redskins continued to have no success on offense, resulting in a punt to Dolphins receiver Jarvis Landry, who fielded the ball at the Miami 31-yard line, broke a few tackles and burst into the clear for a 69-yard score and a 17–10 Dolphins lead. On third-and-13 from their own 29-yard line, with a chance to cut into or tie the Dolphins' lead, Cousins threw to the end zone for Pierre Garçon, but the ball was intercepted by Miami cornerback Brice McCain, ending the Redskins attempt at a potential field goal to narrow the deficit. That ended up being Washington's best chance, as they could not score on any of their subsequent possessions. Miami scored 17 unanswered points and shut out the Redskins in the second half to win 17–10 and win their third straight season opener under coach Joe Philbin. Washington, by contrast, lost in Week 1 for the third consecutive season and for the second straight time under head coach Jay Gruden. It was also Washington's first home loss to the Dolphins since 1984.

After the game, it was announced that receiver DeSean Jackson would miss several weeks with his hamstring injury, and that kicker Kai Forbath had been released and replaced by former Buffalo Bills and New Orleans Saints kicker Dustin Hopkins.

==== Week 2: vs. St. Louis Rams ====
Week Two: St. Louis Rams at Washington Redskins – Game summary

Quarter	1	2	3	4	Total
Rams	0	0	10	0	**10**
**Redskins**	10	7	0	7	**24**

at FedExField, Landover, Maryland

- Date: September 20
- Game time: 1:00 pm. EDT
- Game weather: Partly cloudy, 78 °F (26 °C)
- Game attendance: 74,486
- Referee: Ed Hochuli
- TV announcers (Fox): Dick Stockton, David Diehl and Kristina Pink
- Preview, Gamebook

Game information

**First quarter**

- WAS – Matt Jones 39-yard run (Dustin Hopkins kick), 7:05. Redskins 7–0. **Drive: 3 plays, 72 yards, 1:18.**
- WAS – Dustin Hopkins 46-yard field goal, 0:53. Redskins 10–0. **Drive: 8 plays, 38 yards, 4:27.**

**Second quarter**

- WAS – Pierre Garçon 4-yard pass from Kirk Cousins (Dustin Hopkins kick), 3:02. Redskins 17–0. **Drive: 12 plays, 82 yards, 7:44.**

**Third quarter**

- STL – Greg Zuerlein 52-yard field goal, 9:33. Redskins 17–3. **Drive: 6 plays, 34 yards, 3:15.**
- STL – Kenny Britt 40-yard pass from Nick Foles (Greg Zuerlein kick), 7:01. Redskins 17–10. **Drive: 2 plays, 49 yards, 0:54.**

**Fourth quarter**

- WAS – Matt Jones 3-yard run (Dustin Hopkins kick), 2:38. Redskins 24–10. **Drive: 12 plays, 77 yards, 6:49.**

**Top passers**

- STL – Nick Foles – 17/32, 150 yards, TD
- WAS – Kirk Cousins – 23/27, 203 yards, TD

**Top rushers**

- STL – Tavon Austin – 4 rushes, 40 yards
- WAS – Matt Jones – 19 rushes, 123 yards, 2 TD

**Top receivers**

- STL – Jared Cook – 5 receptions, 47 yards
- WAS – Jordan Reed – 6 receptions, 82 yards

In Week 2, the Redskins played their second straight home game, this time hosting the St. Louis Rams, who had upset the two-time defending NFC champion Seattle Seahawks the previous week. Despite concerns that former Pro Bowl running back Alfred Morris was not a good fit for coach Jay Gruden's offensive scheme, he rattled off a 35-yard run in the first quarter to give Washington some momentum. Third-round draft pick and former Florida Gators running back Matt Jones was able to capitalize, breaking loose on a 39-yard run for his first NFL touchdown and a 7–0 Redskins lead. In the second quarter, with the Redskins having added a Dustin Hopkins field goal for a 10–0 lead, their offensive line continued to overpower the Rams' vaunted defensive front, with Jones bursting through for a gain of 25 down to the St. Louis 23-yard line. A few plays later Kirk Cousins threw a 4-yard touchdown pass to receiver Pierre Garçon, and the Redskins led 17–0 at halftime, their first shutout in the first half in nearly four years.

St. Louis began the second half with a 52-yard Greg Zuerlein field goal to get back within two scores, 17–3. On Washington's ensuing drive Cousins handed the ball off to Jones near midfield but fumbled, and the ball was recovered by Rams safety T.J. McDonald. The Rams took advantage of the turnover a few plays later, with quarterback Nick Foles, a free agent pickup from Philadelphia, throwing a 40-yard touchdown pass to receiver Kenny Britt. All of a sudden St. Louis had pulled to within 7 points. Still holding onto that slim lead with 6 minutes remaining in the game, Cousins hit tight end Jordan Reed for a 29-yard gain, which got the Redskins into field goal range at the Rams' 31-yard line. The Redskins were able to run 3 more minutes off the clock while driving down to the St. Louis 3-yard line, where Jones overpowered several Rams defenders for his second touchdown of the day and a 24–10 lead to put the game away.

The story of the day was the Redskins offensive line. They were able to block for running back Matt Jones well enough that he scored the first two touchdowns of his career and rushed for over 120 yards. They also kept the pressure away from Kirk Cousins, allowing him to throw for a career-high 85% completion percentage and zero interceptions. With the win, both teams moved to 1–1 on the season.

==== Week 3: at New York Giants ====
Week Three: Washington Redskins at New York Giants – Game summary

Quarter	1	2	3	4	Total
Redskins	0	6	0	15	**21**
**Giants**	12	3	3	14	**32**

at MetLife Stadium, East Rutherford, New Jersey

- Date: September 24
- Game time: 8:30 pm. EDT
- Game weather: Clear, 71 °F (22 °C)
- Game attendance: 76,081
- Referee: Ron Torbert
- TV announcers (CBS/NFLN): Jim Nantz, Phil Simms and Tracy Wolfson
- Recap, Gamebook

Game information

**First quarter**

- NYG – Punt blocked by Rashad Jennings out of bounds in end zone for a safety, 12:47. Giants 2–0.
- NYG – Andre Williams 3-yard run (Josh Brown kick), 6:34. Giants 9–0. **Drive: 4 plays, 14 yards, 1:56.**
- NYG – Josh Brown 35-yard field goal, 0:39. Giants 12–0. **Drive: 8 plays, 47 yards, 3:45.**

**Second quarter**

- WAS – Dustin Hopkins 44-yard field goal, 11:31. Giants 12–3. **Drive: 10 plays, 54 yards, 4:08.**
- NYG – Josh Brown 36-yard field goal, 7:32. Giants 15–3. **Drive: 9 plays, 47 yards, 3:59.**
- WAS – Dustin Hopkins 37-yard field goal, 1:43. Giants 15–6. **Drive: 13 plays, 61 yards, 5:49.**

**Third quarter**

- NYG – Josh Brown 48-yard field goal, 7:29. Giants 18–6. **Drive: 15 plays, 50 yards, 7:31.**

**Fourth quarter**

- NYG – Odell Beckham, Jr. 30-yard pass from Eli Manning (Josh Brown kick), 13:39. Giants 25–6. **Drive: 8 plays, 73 yards, 5:06.**
- WAS – Chris Thompson 4-yard pass from Kirk Cousins (Kirk Cousins–Jamison Crowder pass), 3:40. Giants 25–14. **Drive: 12 plays, 74 yards, 3:44.**
- NYG – Rueben Randle 41-yard pass from Eli Manning (Josh Brown kick), 3:21. Giants 32–14. **Drive: 3 plays, 41 yards, 0:19.**
- WAS – Rashad Ross 101-yard kickoff return (Dustin Hopkins kick), 3:08. Giants 32–21. **Drive: 0 plays, 0 yards, 0:13.**

**Top passers**

- WAS – Kirk Cousins – 30/49, 316 yards, TD, 2 INT
- NYG – Eli Manning – 23/32, 279 yards, 2 TD

**Top rushers**

- WAS – Matt Jones – 11 rushes, 38 yards
- NYG – Rashad Jennings – 11 rushes, 32 yards

**Top receivers**

- WAS – Jordan Reed – 6 receptions, 96 yards
- NYG – Rueben Randle – 7 receptions, 116 yards, TD

With the news that Dallas Cowboys quarterback Tony Romo had fractured his left clavicle in Dallas' Week 2 win coupled with star wide receiver Dez Bryant's broken foot, Washington and New York, both one game behind Dallas, looked to use this primetime game as a springboard to the division lead. In Week 4 of the 2014 season, Kirk Cousins threw a career-high four interceptions against the Giants in a 45–14 blowout loss. This game began inauspiciously for Washington as well; after their opening drive stalled, punter Tress Way's punt was blocked by Giants running back Rashad Jennings. The ball rolled out of the end zone for a safety and a 2–0 Giants lead. On the Redskins' next possession they again had the ball near their own end zone, and Cousins' pass intended for Pierre Garçon was intercepted by Giants cornerback Prince Amukamara and returned to the Washington 15-yard line. Giants second-year running back Andre Williams capitalized, running through Redskins defenders for a 1-yard touchdown and a 9–0 Giants lead just 9 minutes into the game. The teams exchanged field goals to make the score 12–3 in the middle of the second quarter, when Giants tight end Larry Donnell, who had caught 3 touchdown passes in Week 4 of 2014, dropped a pass that would have given New York a first-and-goal. They eventually settled for another Josh Brown field goal to go up 15–3. On the Redskins' next possession, Kirk Cousins underthrew tight end Jordan Reed, who was open in the end zone. They had to settle for a Dustin Hopkins field goal to make the score 15–6 entering halftime.

The Giants again entered Redskins territory but were unable to get in the end zone, leading to Josh Brown's third field goal of the game. Later in the third quarter, a promising Redskins drive into Giants territory was disrupted by a Cousins pass being tipped into the air and intercepted by New York linebacker Uani 'Unga. It was Cousins' 8th career interception against the Giants to go with only 1 career touchdown. With the score still 18–6 in the fourth quarter, Eli Manning hit star receiver Odell Beckham Jr., who had sprinted past Redskins corner Bashaud Breeland, for a 30-yard touchdown. Redskins running back Chris Thompson caught a 4-yard Cousins pass for a touchdown to provide a glimmer of hope, but it was quickly squashed by a 41-yard touchdown pass from Manning to Rueben Randle to put the Giants lead at 32–13. Redskins rookie receiver and returner Rashad Ross later returned a kickoff 101 yards to make the final score 32–21.

After losing fourth-quarter leads in their first two games, the Giants got their first win of the season to move to 1–2. After leading the NFL in rushing yards per game through the first two weeks of the season, the Redskins' run game was stagnant, with Matt Jones 38 rushing yards leading the team, followed by Alfred Morris' 19. Kirk Cousins threw two interceptions, giving him a total of four in three games.

==== Week 4: vs. Philadelphia Eagles ====
Week Four: Philadelphia Eagles at Washington Redskins – Game summary

Quarter	1	2	3	4	Total
Eagles	0	0	13	7	**20**
**Redskins**	6	7	3	7	**23**

at FedExField, Landover, Maryland

- Date: October 4
- Game time: 1:00 pm. EDT
- Game weather: Cloudy, 59 °F (15 °C)
- Game attendance: 74,767
- Referee: Jerome Boger
- TV announcers (Fox): Dick Stockton, David Diehl and Kristina Pink
- Recap, Gamebook

Game information

**First quarter**

- WAS – Dustin Hopkins 20-yard field goal, 7:22. Redskins 3–0. **Drive: 13 plays, 78 yards, 7:38.**
- WAS – Dustin Hopkins 38-yard field goal, 0:51. Redskins 6–0. **Drive: 10 plays, 39 yards, 5:11.**

**Second quarter**

- WAS – Kirk Cousins 1-yard run (Dustin Hopkins kick), 5:18. Redskins 13–0. **Drive: 10 plays, 68 yards, 5:35.**

**Third quarter**

- PHI – Riley Cooper 62-yard pass from Sam Bradford (kick failed, wide right), 11:54. Redskins 13–6. **Drive: 8 plays, 80 yards, 3:06.**
- PHI – Brent Celek 10-yard pass from Sam Bradford (Caleb Sturgis kick), 8:17. Tied 13–13. **Drive: 5 plays, 56 yards, 1:33.**
- WAS – Dustin Hopkins 33-yard field goal, 3:49. Redskins 16–13. **Drive: 9 plays, 65 yards, 4:28.**

**Fourth quarter**

- PHI – Miles Austin 39-yard pass from Sam Bradford (Caleb Sturgis kick), 14:40. Eagles 20–16. **Drive: 3 plays, 58 yards, 0:21.**
- WAS – Pierre Garçon 4-yard pass from Kirk Cousins (Dustin Hopkins kick), 0:26. Redskins 23–20. **Drive: 15 plays, 90 yards, 5:39.**

**Top passers**

- PHI – Sam Bradford – 15/28, 270 yards, 3 TD
- WAS – Kirk Cousins – 31/46, 290 yards, TD

**Top rushers**

- PHI – DeMarco Murray – 8 rushes, 36 yards
- WAS – Alfred Morris – 17 rushes, 62 yards

**Top receivers**

- PHI – Riley Cooper – 2 receptions, 72 yards, TD
- WAS – Jamison Crowder – 7 receptions, 65 yards

The Redskins hosted the Eagles in another NFC East matchup with both teams at 1–2. The Redskins started on offense, and running back Chris Thompson converted a third-and-long with a 42-yard run into Eagles territory. Just 3 plays later, he took a short Cousins pass 19 yards to the 21-yard line. They moved the ball down to the 2-yard line, but could not score a touchdown. They took a 3–0 lead off of a Dustin Hopkins field goal. Philadelphia started shakily, losing 8 yards on their next drive before punting back to Washington. The Redskins were able to move from midfield down to the Eagles' 20-yard line, but the drive again stalled in the redzone and they settled for another Hopkins field goal. Last year's NFL rushing leader DeMarco Murray rattled off a 30-yard gain on the Eagles' next possession, but the teams exchanged punts after it. After several short passes by Cousins got the Redskins inside the red zone yet again, the Redskins got a first down at the 1-yard line after a pass interference call on Eagles rookie cornerback Eric Rowe. Kirk Cousins then ran the ball in for the first rushing touchdown of his career, and Washington led 13–0. On the Eagles' next drive, a Sam Bradford deep ball to rookie receiver Nelson Agholor was negated by a Ryan Mathews fumble that was recovered by Redskins linebacker Keenan Robinson on a trick play. After a Redskins punt (which speedy returner Darren Sproles returned to the Washington 30-yard line), Bradford threw an apparent touchdown to tight end Zach Ertz that was nullified by an illegal formation penalty on Agholor. With all the momentum lost and a sack by Redskins rookie linebacker Preston Smith moving the Eagles back to the 25-yard line, kicker Caleb Sturgis missed a short field goal to keep the score at 13–0. It was the first time the Redskins had shut out back-to-back home opponents in the first half since 1997.

After driving to their own 38-yard line, Philadelphia got the break they needed, with Bradford connecting with Riley Cooper for a 62-yard score. This cut the Redskins' lead to only 7 points, as Sturgis missed the extra point. Washington advanced the ball only 9 yards before punting back to the Eagles, who got the ball at their own 29-yard line. Two Redskins penalties moved the ball 29 yards, and a 10-yard Bradford pass was caught by tight end Brent Celek to tie the game at 13–13. The Redskins retaliated by immediately getting into Eagles territory, courtesy of a 43-yard bomb from Kirk Cousins to rookie receiver Rashad Ross. Another rookie receiver, Jamison Crowder, got them inside the 20. From there, Hopkins kicked the ball through the uprights from 33 yards out, allowing Washington to regain its 16–13 advantage. The Redskins were quickly back in business after an Eagles punt, and now had a chance to go up by two scores, but Jordan Reed fumbled in Eagles territory to end the third quarter. Three plays later, Bradford burned the Redskins secondary on another deep ball, this one 39 yards to veteran wide receiver Miles Austin. More importantly, the Eagles took their first lead of the game, 20–16. The Redskins remained scoreless in the second half, punting from the Eagles' 35-yard line instead of attempting a 53-yard field goal. The Eagles were barely able to cross midfield before punting back to Washington. With under 9 minutes remaining, they needed to regain some offensive momentum, but could not, going three-and-out. However, they were able to get a defensive stop, forcing the Eagles to go three-and-out as well. Alfred Morris runs of 16 and 13 yards got the offense rolling, and Pierre Garçon catches of 14 and 12 yards helped get Washington down to the Eagles' 4-yard line with 35 seconds left. Cousins threw one incomplete pass to Crowder before connecting with Garcon for the game-winning touchdown and the 23–20 win.

It was the second game-winning drive of Cousins' career, the first being Week 14 of the 2012 season against the Baltimore Ravens, when he entered the game in relief of the injured Robert Griffin III. This win was also Cousins' first division win, after previously going 0–5 against the Cowboys, Giants, and Eagles. With the win the Redskins moved to 2–2 for the season. Cousins threw zero interceptions for the second consecutive home game, a first in his career, and the Redskins defense did not allow a 40-yard rusher for the second straight week.

==== Week 5: at Atlanta Falcons ====
Week Five: Washington Redskins at Atlanta Falcons – Game summary

Quarter	1	2	3	4	OT	Total
Redskins	0	7	0	12	0	**19**
**Falcons**	0	3	3	13	6	**25**

at Georgia Dome, Atlanta, Georgia

- Date: October 11
- Game time: 1:00 pm. EDT
- Game weather: None (indoor stadium)
- Game attendance: 70,178
- Referee: Bill Vinovich
- TV announcers (Fox): Chris Myers, Ronde Barber and Jennifer Hale
- Recap, Gamebook

Game information

**First quarter**

- No scoring plays.

**Second quarter**

- WAS – Derek Carrier 7-yard pass from Kirk Cousins (Dustin Hopkins kick), 12:12. Redskins 7–0. **Drive: 12 plays, 67 yards, 6:47.**
- ATL – Matt Bryant 42-yard field goal, 7:07. Redskins 7–3. **Drive: 12 plays, 56 yards, 5:05.**

**Third quarter**

- ATL – Matt Bryant 28-yard field goal, 1:54. Redskins 7–6. **Drive: 11 plays, 47 yards, 4:47.**

**Fourth quarter**

- ATL – Julio Jones fumble recovery in the end zone (pass failed), 9:14. Falcons 12–7. **Drive: 11 plays, 91 yards, 6:32.**
- WAS – Matt Jones 2-yard run (pass failed), 7:59. Redskins 13–12. **Drive: 3 plays, 80 yards, 1:15.**
- WAS – Dustin Hopkins 28-yard field goal, 2:38. Redskins 16–12. **Drive: 6 plays, 11 yards, 3:06.**
- ATL – Devonta Freeman 6-yard run (Matt Bryant kick), 0:24. Falcons 19–16. **Drive: 10 plays, 80 yards, 2:14.**
- WAS – Dustin Hopkins 52-yard field goal, 0:00. Tied 19–19. **Drive: 4 plays, 46 yards, 0:24.**

**Overtime**

- ATL – Robert Alford 59-yard interception return, 12:15. Falcons 25–19.

**Top passers**

- WAS – Kirk Cousins – 21/32, 219 yards, TD, 2 INT
- ATL – Matt Ryan – 24/42, 254 yards, 2 INT

**Top rushers**

- WAS – Matt Jones – 11 rushes, 20 yards, TD
- ATL – Devonta Freeman – 27 rushes, 153 yards, TD

**Top receivers**

- WAS – Jamison Crowder – 8 receptions, 87 yards
- ATL – Jacob Tamme – 8 receptions, 94 yards

The Redskins played a 4–0 Atlanta Falcons team for the second time in four years; they had previously hosted the 4–0 Falcons in the 2012 season, when Atlanta won 24–17 to move to 5–0 for the first time in franchise history. That game, coincidentally, was Kirk Cousins' first appearance in an NFL game. Three years later, now as the starter, he was attempting to lead Washington to their first 3–2 start since 2011. He faced a stern test though, as his career TD–INT ratio on the road was 11–13, and he had never played in a road game without throwing at least one interception.

Washington was only able to run four plays on their first drive before having to punt to Atlanta. The Falcons were able to cross midfield before quarterback Matt Ryan's pass to superstar receiver Julio Jones was tipped and intercepted by Redskins safety Trenton Robinson; it was Washington's first interception of the season. Nearing the end of a scoreless first quarter, the Redskins tried to accumulate some momentum in the running game, as their longest run so far had been only 4 yards. Alfred Morris and Matt Jones both saw action, but it was the passing game that began to heat up. The two longest plays on the drive were a 14-yard pass to Chris Thompson and a 21-yarder to Pierre Garçon. The drive culminated in tight end Derek Carrier's first career touchdown pass, a 7-yard throw from Cousins that gave the Redskins a 7–0 lead early in the second quarter. Atlanta responded with a methodical drive, including only two plays longer than 7 yards, to get on the board. Kicker Matt Bryant connected on a 42-yard field goal and the Falcons cut the deficit to 7–3. Washington's next drive was not as effective, with only one out of five plays gaining positive yards before Cousins threw deep and was intercepted by Falcons cornerback Robert Alford, who returned the ball into Redskins territory. Of the 8 career road games in which Cousins had now played, he totaled 14 interceptions, and had thrown at least one interception in each.

The Falcons now needed to capitalize on the turnover, and advanced the ball to the Redskins' 23-yard line, easily within field goal range. Defensive end Chris Baker had other ideas, sacking Ryan on third-and-3 and forcing a fumble, which was recovered by linebacker Will Compton. However, Atlanta regained possession with 1:39 left and all three of their timeouts. Running back Devonta Freeman and tight end Jacob Tamme helped get the Falcons into field goal range, but Bryant missed a short 38-yard attempt, bouncing the ball off of the right upright. Entering halftime, undefeated Atlanta trailed Washington 7–3 at home.

The Falcons began the second half aggressively, throwing on 6 of their first 7 plays. This got them into field goal range. Bryant attempted to redeem himself for the earlier miss, but this kick bounced off the left upright. The ensuing Redskins drive utilized several short Cousins passes to get into field goal range, although Hopkins missed the 53-yard attempt. Atlanta crossed midfield on their next drive, and faced a decision on fourth-and-6 from the Redskins' 40-yard line, just outside of Bryant's range. Ryan threw to Jones, his most reliable target, for a gain of 9 and the first down. Two plays later, Bashaud Breeland was called for a horse-collar tackle, which moved the ball from the Redskins' 30-yard line to the 15. This was close enough for Bryant to convert a field goal, and Atlanta had crept within one of Washington, 7–6. Still unable to move the ball effectively, the Redskins went three-and-out to give the ball back to Atlanta. Washington then struggled on defense as well, allowing 4 plays of 10+ yards. Chris Baker forced a Freeman fumble at the goal line, but Julio Jones jumped on the ball in the end zone for the go-ahead score. Falcons first-year head coach Dan Quinn opted to attempt a two-point conversion to go up by a full seven points, but Ryan's pass fell incomplete to keep the lead at 12–7. The Atlanta drive covered 91 yards in just 11 plays, and now only 9 minutes remained in the game.

With their lead gone, and having been shut out in the second half, the Redskins began a crucial drive from their own 20-yard line. A 10-yard pass and a 26-yard pass, both to rookie receiver Jamison Crowder, were followed by a deep attempt to fellow rookie Rashad Ross. The ball fell incomplete, but Atlanta defensive back Robert Alford was assessed a 42-yard pass interference penalty that gave Washington the ball on the 2-yard line. On the next play, Matt Jones completed the all-rookie drive with a touchdown, allowing Washington to regain the lead, 13–12. Redskins coach Jay Gruden attempted a two-point conversion to extend the margin to a field goal, but it, like the Falcons' attempt, fell incomplete. Atlanta then committed a surprising turnover, a Ryan pass intercepted by Breeland, who returned the ball all the way back to the Atlanta 21-yard line. This allowed the Redskins to extend the lead to 16–12, significant because Atlanta now needed a touchdown to win instead of a field goal. Atlanta's next 6 plays covered 67 yards, followed by an apparent 13-yard touchdown pass on third-and-2; however, the play was later ruled an incomplete pass because Freeman did not maintain possession of the ball as he fell to the ground. The Falcons had to convert the next play, a fourth-and-2, to keep any hope of a perfect season. Veteran receiver Roddy White made the catch, and Freeman redeemed himself on the next play with a touchdown, resulting in a 19–16 Falcons lead. They had run the clock down to 24 seconds, leaving almost no time for the Redskins to respond, but Washington still had all three timeouts. Their next three plays, gains of 20, 19, and 7 to Carrier, Garcon, and Crowder, took only 19 seconds, leaving 5 seconds for a 52-yard attempt at a game-tying field goal. Hopkins drilled the kick, tying the game at 19–19, and the game went into overtime. In 24 previous meetings, dating back to 1966, the Redskins and Falcons had never gone into overtime, and Atlanta had won the last four meetings.

The Redskins won the coin toss and began overtime on offense. A Crowder 17-yard catch moved them near midfield, only needing about 20 more yards to get into Hopkins' range. Three plays later, though, Cousins attempted to pass to rookie receiver Ryan Grant, but Grant slipped on the route, allowing Robert Alford to intercept the pass and return it 59 yards for a touchdown, a 25–19 Falcons win, and their second 5–0 start in franchise history.

For the Redskins, the heartbreaking loss was the second time in four seasons they had lost to Atlanta in Week 5 by 7 points or fewer. Cousins moved to 0–3 in his career against the Falcons and threw the 15th career interception on the road in only 8 games. In each of Washington's three losses, Cousins had thrown 2 interceptions; in their two wins, he had not thrown any.

==== Week 6: at New York Jets ====
Week Six: Washington Redskins at New York Jets – Game summary

Quarter	1	2	3	4	Total
Redskins	7	6	0	7	**20**
**Jets**	7	3	17	7	**34**

at MetLife Stadium, East Rutherford, New Jersey

- Date: October 18
- Game time: 1:00 pm. EDT
- Game weather: Clear, 49 °F (9 °C)
- Game attendance: 78,160
- Referee: Pete Morelli
- TV announcers (Fox): Kenny Albert, Daryl Johnston and Holly Sonders
- Recap, Gamebook

Game information

**First quarter**

- WAS – Pierre Garçon 2-yard pass from Kirk Cousins (Dustin Hopkins kick), 9:29. Redskins 7–0. **Drive: 7 plays, 37 yards, 3:45.**
- NYJ – Chris Ivory 1-yard run (Nick Folk kick), 3:28. Tied 7–7. **Drive: 11 plays, 83 yards, 6:01.**

**Second quarter**

- NYJ – Nick Folk 35-yard field goal, 11:35. Jets 10–7. **Drive: 8 plays, 74 yards, 3:55.**
- WAS – Dustin Hopkins 54-yard field goal, 2:17. Tied 10–10. **Drive: 7 plays, 19 yards, 2:45.**
- WAS – Dustin Hopkins 30-yard field goal, 0:02. Redskins 13–10. **Drive: 6 plays, 40 yards, 0:34.**

**Third quarter**

- NYJ – Nick Folk 39-yard field goal, 11:00. Tied 13–13. **Drive: 7 plays, 47 yards, 4:00.**
- NYJ – Ryan Fitzpatrick 18-yard run (Nick Folk kick), 10:02. Jets 20–13. **Drive: 1 play, 18 yards, 0:08.**
- NYJ – Brandon Marshall 35-yard pass from Ryan Fitzpatrick (Nick Folk kick), 5:53. Jets 27–13. **Drive: 6 plays, 76 yards, 2:56.**

**Fourth quarter**

- NYJ – Eric Decker 2-yard pass from Ryan Fitzpatrick (Nick Folk kick), 14:18. Jets 34–13. **Drive: 9 plays, 73 yards, 3:59.**
- WAS – Rashad Ross blocked punt recovery in the end zone (Dustin Hopkins kick), 3:59. Jets 34–20.

**Top passers**

- WAS – Kirk Cousins – 25/43, 196 yards, TD, 2 INT
- NYJ – Ryan Fitzpatrick – 19/26, 253 yards, 2 TD, INT

**Top rushers**

- WAS – Alfred Morris – 11 rushes, 21 yards
- NYJ – Chris Ivory – 20 rushes, 146 yards, TD

**Top receivers**

- WAS – Jamison Crowder – 4 receptions, 40 yards
- NYJ – Brandon Marshall – 7 receptions, 111 yards, TD

In Week 6, the Redskins played on the road for the second consecutive Sunday, this time against the 4–1 New York Jets, who had held three of their first four opponents to 14 points or less and were coming off of their bye week.

Washington punted after going three-and-out on their first possession of the game. They were quickly back on offense, however, as Jets receiver Eric Decker was stripped by Bashaud Breeland at the Jets' 37-yard line. After driving down to the 2-yard line, Washington scored on a Kirk Cousins touchdown pass to Pierre Garçon, thanks to an uncharacteristic coverage error by former All-Pro cornerback Darrelle Revis. New York's first four plays on the next drive all involved running back Chris Ivory, and gained 33 yards. Quarterback Ryan Fitzpatrick then threw a 35-yard pass to Eric Decker, and Ivory punched it in for the tying score two plays later. The Jets’ stingy defense held the Redskins in check on their next drive, forcing another punt to end the first quarter. Chris Ivory then energized the raucous New York crowd with a 54-yard run to just outside the Redskins' 20, but the drive stalled and placekicker Nick Folk tacked on three more points, giving New York a 10–7 lead. Three punts followed, two by Washington and one by New York, before Breeland forced and recovered his second fumble of the game, this one off of five-time Pro Bowler and former All-Pro receiver Brandon Marshall. With a short field, Cousins and the Redskins gained 19 yards, and Redskins kicker Dustin Hopkins booted a career-long 54-yard field goal to tie the game at 10–10 with just over two minutes remaining in the first half. Fitzpatrick led the Jets into Redskins territory with three short passes that gained 32 yards, before being intercepted by Breeland at the Washington 20-yard line, Breeland's third turnover recovery of the half. Six plays and three timeouts later, Hopkins converted a 30-yard field goal to give the visiting Redskins a 13–10 halftime lead.

On the first New York drive of the second half, back-to-back plays by Ivory carried the Jets across midfield, and the game was quickly tied again thanks to a Nick Folk field goal. After a Jets punt and an Alfred Morris 2-yard run, Cousins was intercepted by Revis, who returned the ball to the Redskins’ 18-yard line. Fitzpatrick, not normally known as a particularly mobile quarterback, saw a hole in the defense and scored an 18-yard rushing touchdown on the very next play. Washington had gone from a 3-point lead to a 7-point deficit in a span of only five plays, and now trailed 20–13. The turnover also kept alive Cousins’ streak of having thrown an interception in every road game of his career. The next Redskins drive, a three-and-out, did nothing to help them regain the momentum, nor did the 14-yard Marshall catch, 18-yard Zac Stacy run, or 35-yard touchdown reception, also by Marshall, on the next Jets drive. Badly hoping to get themselves back in the game, the Redskins called a deep pass to former Duke University receiver Jamison Crowder, but Jets safety Marcus Gilchrist intercepted the ball for Cousins’ second turnover of the game. New York continued to pile up big plays, as well, with a 32-yard Ivory run to start the drive, and two third-down conversions totaling 28 yards. Fitzpatrick capitalized on those conversions, and threw a 2-yard touchdown pass to Decker, wrapping up a 21–0 third quarter that resulted in a 34–13 Jets lead. Still reeling with 11 minutes left, Washington desperately tried to mount a comeback, engineering a 59-yard drive that resulted in no points, due to an incomplete pass on fourth-and-1 from the Jets 2-yard line. They ended up scoring later in the fourth quarter, but not on offense; undrafted rookie Rashad Ross blocked a Jets punt and recovered it in the end zone, which provided the game's final score of 34–20.

The hometown New York Jets improved to a surprising 5–1, already surpassing their win total from the entire 2014 season. The Washington Redskins dropped to 2–4 on the season with the loss, and 0–3 on the road. In each of their four losses, Cousins had thrown 2 interceptions; he had thrown none in the two victories. Murmurs calling for coach Jay Gruden to be fired had begun to escalate.

==== Week 7: vs. Tampa Bay Buccaneers ====
Week Seven: Tampa Bay Buccaneers at Washington Redskins – Game summary

Quarter	1	2	3	4	Total
Buccaneers	10	14	0	6	**30**
**Redskins**	0	7	14	10	**31**

at FedExField, Landover, Maryland

- Date: October 25
- Game time: 1:00 pm. EDT
- Game weather: Sunny, 68 °F (20 °C)
- Game attendance: 72,912
- Referee: Jeff Triplette
- TV announcers (Fox): Kenny Albert, Daryl Johnston and Laura Okmin
- Recap, Gamebook

Game information

**First quarter**

- TB – Mike Evans 40-yard pass from Jameis Winston (Connor Barth kick), 11:47. Buccaneers 7–0. **Drive: 3 plays, 64 yards, 1:19.**
- TB – Connor Barth 22-yard field goal, 5:06. Buccaneers 10–0. **Drive: 8 plays, 71 yards, 4:26.**

**Second quarter**

- TB – Donteea Dye 7-yard pass from Jameis Winston (Connor Barth kick), 11:34. Buccaneers 17–0. **Drive: 14 plays, 72 yards, 7:00.**
- TB – Howard Jones 43-yard fumble return (Connor Barth kick), 8:19. Buccaneers 24–0.
- WAS – Kirk Cousins 8-yard run (Dustin Hopkins kick), 4:26. Buccaneers 24–7. **Drive: 7 plays, 74 yards, 3:53.**

**Third quarter**

- WAS – Ryan Grant 3-yard pass from Kirk Cousins (Dustin Hopkins kick), 11:10. Buccaneers 24–14. **Drive: 4 plays, 60 yards, 1:44.**
- WAS – Jordan Reed 3-yard pass from Kirk Cousins (Dustin Hopkins kick), 6:56. Buccaneers 24–21. **Drive: 7 plays, 51 yards, 4:14.**

**Fourth quarter**

- TB – Connor Barth 45-yard field goal, 13:51. Buccaneers 27–21. **Drive: 12 plays, 53 yards, 8:05.**
- WAS – Dustin Hopkins 35-yard field goal, 7:29. Buccaneers 27–24. **Drive: 11 plays, 63 yards, 6:22.**
- TB – Connor Barth 21-yard field goal, 2:24. Buccaneers 30–24. **Drive: 11 plays, 91 yards, 5:05.**
- WAS – Jordan Reed 6-yard pass from Kirk Cousins (Dustin Hopkins kick), 0:24. Redskins 30–31. **Drive: 11 plays, 80 yards, 2:00.**

**Top passers**

- TB – Jameis Winston – 21/29, 297 yards, 2 TD
- WAS – Kirk Cousins – 33/40, 317 yards, 3 TD

**Top rushers**

- TB – Doug Martin – 19 rushes, 136 yards
- WAS – Matt Jones – 9 rushes, 29 yards

**Top receivers**

- TB – Mike Evans – 8 receptions, 164 yards, TD
- WAS – Jordan Reed – 11 receptions, 72 yards, 2 TD

The 2–4 Washington Redskins hosted the 2–3 Tampa Bay Buccaneers at FedExField for the second consecutive season, with both teams badly needing a win to get their seasons back on track. In 2014, the Buccaneers were 1–8 entering their matchup at Washington, but rookie receiver Mike Evans torched the Redskins defense for 209 receiving yards, setting up a 27–7 Bucs win.

After a quick Washington three-and-out to start the game, Evans picked up right where he left off, beating safety Ryan Clark for a 40-yard touchdown less than two minutes into the game. A second short Redskins drive gave the ball right back to Tampa Bay, and #1 overall pick Jameis Winston wasted no time driving down the field, with back-to-back completions covering 54 yards to Louis Murphy and Evans, respectively. Washington limited the damage, forcing a field goal attempt to only be down 10–0. Their offense continued to stagnate, however, and the Buccaneers quickly regained possession. A methodical, 14-play, 72-yard drive ensued, and the results were a 7-yard touchdown pass from Winston to Donteea Dye and a 17–0 lead. Washington's offense, which ran only 10 plays in the first quarter and only gained one first down (by penalty), managed to cross midfield on their subsequent drive, but Buccaneer defensive end Jacquies Smith sacked Cousins, forcing a fumble that fellow defensive end Howard Jones returned 43 yards for a touchdown. The visiting Buccaneers, all of a sudden, led 24–0. Two rookie receivers, Ryan Grant and Jamison Crowder, caught passes from Cousins totaling 37 yards on the next drive, and Cousins finished it off himself with a 7-yard touchdown run, his second of the season. The rest of the first half would pass without any more fireworks, but the Redskins sorely needed some in the second half to overcome the 17-point halftime deficit they faced.

Tampa Bay exited the locker room looking to extend their lead, but could not do so and punted back to the Redskins. A deep pass from Cousins to much-maligned receiver Andre Roberts picked up 38 yards and got them inside Tampa Bay's 10-yard line. Two plays later, Ryan Grant hauled in a 4-yard touchdown pass to inch closer, 24–14. Redskins coach Jay Gruden made a bold decision, opting to attempt an onside kick. A few Redskins players struggled to handle the ball, but safety Trenton Robinson dove on it and gave Washington a fresh drive just short of midfield. The first play of the drive was a deep Cousins pass to Grant that got Washington inside the 20-yard line. Two false start penalties unnerved the home crowd, but tight end Jordan Reed made a 3-yard touchdown reception on third-and-goal. In just over eight minutes, the Buccaneers' lead had shrunk from 17 points to only 3. Trying to regain their momentum on the next drive, Tampa Bay gained 44 yards on two Evans catches, but a 43-yard run by Charles Sims was nullified by penalty. Winston threw a 20-yard touchdown pass to Evans, but that, too, was nullified due to a pas interference call on Evans. The Buccaneers had to settle for a Connor Barth field goal to make the score 27–21. Washington's next drive had no plays longer than 15 yards, but a 15-yard unnecessary roughness penalty on William Gholston helped them get into Hopkins' range. He countered with a field goal of his own to bring the score back within 3 with 7:29 remaining in the game. Winston and Evans, hoping to put the game out of reach, hooked up twice for a total of 30 yards, and Doug Martin broke free for a 49-yard gain before Bashaud Breeland pushed him out-of-bounds at the 5-yard line. On third-and-goal from the 1-yard line, attempting for a 10-point lead with under 3 minutes remaining, Charles Sims was stopped for a loss of 2 yards. The Buccaneers had failed to salt the game away, and Barth's field goal left Washington with a chance to win the game.

Washington advanced from their own 20-yard line to Tampa Bay's 6-yard line in just 8 plays, all of which were Cousins completions. With only 36 seconds left, Washington had a first-and-goal from the 6-yard line. Two incompletions, Cousins' first two of the drive, followed, but on third down Cousins hit Jordan Reed for a 6-yard touchdown and a 31–30 lead with 24 seconds left on the clock. Tampa Bay still had a chance to kick a game-winning field goal. They had moved the ball to their own 42-yard line, only about 20 yards from Barth's range, when Charles Sims fumbled the ball and Chris Baker recovered it for Washington. They had stormed back from a 24–0 deficit, which was the largest comeback in franchise history. Kirk Cousins became the first quarterback in NFL history with two game-winning touchdowns in the final 30 seconds of games in the same calendar month, and Jordan Reed had the first multi-touchdown game of his career, but perhaps most importantly, coach Gruden had quieted the doubters by inspiring his team to a historic comeback.

==== Week 9: at New England Patriots ====
Week Nine: Washington Redskins at New England Patriots – Game summary

Quarter	1	2	3	4	Total
Redskins	0	3	0	7	**10**
**Patriots**	14	3	3	7	**27**

at Gillette Stadium, Foxborough, Massachusetts

- Date: November 8
- Game time: 1:00 pm. EST
- Game weather: Sunny, 54 °F (12 °C)
- Game attendance: 66,829
- Referee: Terry McAulay
- TV announcers (Fox): Kevin Burkhardt, John Lynch and Pam Oliver
- Recap, Gamebook

Game information

**First quarter**

- NE – Julian Edelman 4-yard pass from Tom Brady (Stephen Gostkowski kick), 9:01. Patriots 7–0. **Drive: 13 plays, 84 yards, 5:59.**
- NE – LeGarrette Blount 5-yard run (Stephen Gostkowski kick), 4:30. Patriots 14–0. **Drive: 6 plays, 28 yards, 1:59.**

**Second quarter**

- NE – Stephen Gostkowski 21-yard field goal, 7:56. Patriots 17–0. **Drive: 10 plays, 61 yards, 5:03.**
- WAS – Dustin Hopkins 23-yard field goal, 0:13. Patriots 17–3. **Drive: 16 plays, 75 yards, 7:43.**

**Third quarter**

- NE – Stephen Gostkowski 21-yard field goal, 7:32. Patriots 20–3. **Drive: 9 plays, 54 yards, 4:38.**

**Fourth quarter**

- NE – Brandon Boldin 18-yard pass from Tom Brady (Stephen Gostkowski kick), 11:28. Patriots 27–3. **Drive: 14 plays, 88 yards, 7:42.**
- WAS – Jordan Reed 3-yard pass from Kirk Cousins (Dustin Hopkins kick), 0:25. Patriots 27–10. **Drive: 12 plays, 83 yards, 3:26.**

**Top passers**

- WAS – Kirk Cousins – 22/40, 217 yards, TD, INT
- NE – Tom Brady – 26/39, 299 yards, 2 TD, INT

**Top rushers**

- WAS – Matt Jones – 11 rushes, 27 yards
- NE – LeGarrette Blount – 29 rushes, 129 yards, TD

**Top receivers**

- WAS – Pierre Garçon – 4 receptions, 70 yards
- NE – Brandon LaFell – 5 receptions, 102 yards

The Skins would not get in any rhythm during this game, as Tom Brady and the Patriots controlled the game from start to finish. With the loss, the Redskins fell to 3–5.

==== Week 10: vs. New Orleans Saints ====
Week Ten: New Orleans Saints at Washington Redskins – Game summary

Quarter	1	2	3	4	Total
Saints	7	7	0	0	**14**
**Redskins**	14	13	10	10	**47**

at FedExField, Landover, Maryland

- Date: November 15
- Game time: 1:00 pm. EST
- Game weather: Sunny, 64 °F (18 °C)
- Game attendance: 75,086
- Referee: John Parry
- TV announcers (Fox): Kenny Albert, Daryl Johnston and Laura Okmin
- Recap, Gamebook

Game information

**First quarter**

- WAS – Jordan Reed 16-yard pass from Kirk Cousins (Dustin Hopkins kick), 8:14. Redskins 7–0. **Drive: 10 plays, 96 yards, 6:46.**
- NO – Brandin Cooks 4-yard pass from Drew Brees (Kai Forbath kick), 5:52. Tied 7–7. **Drive: 5 plays, 83 yards, 2:22.**
- WAS – Jamison Crowder 11-yard pass from Kirk Cousins (Dustin Hopkins kick), 0:58. Redskins 14–7. **Drive: 8 plays, 80 yards, 4:54.**

**Second quarter**

- NO – Brandin Cooks 60-yard pass from Drew Brees (Kai Forbath kick), 10:44. Tied 14–14. **Drive: 3 plays, 83 yards, 1:23.**
- WAS – Matt Jones 78-yard pass from Kirk Cousins (Dustin Hopkins kick), 9:52. Redskins 21–14. **Drive: 2 plays, 80 yards, 0:52.**
- WAS – Dustin Hopkins 35-yard field goal, 3:18. Redskins 24–14. **Drive: 7 plays, 67 yards, 3:54.**
- WAS – Dustin Hopkins 23-yard field goal, 0:00. Redskins 27–14. **Drive: 8 plays, 64 yards, 1:42.**

**Third quarter**

- WAS – Dustin Hopkins 40-yard field goal, 4:38. Redskins 30–14. **Drive: 8 plays, 47 yards, 4:15.**
- WAS – Jordan Reed 8-yard pass from Kirk Cousins (Dustin Hopkins kick), 0:11. Redskins 37–14. **Drive: 6 plays, 44 yards, 3:10.**

**Fourth quarter**

- WAS – Dashon Goldson 35-yard interception return (Dustin Hopkins kick), 14:18. Redskins 44–14.
- WAS – Dustin Hopkins 22-yard field goal, 9:33. Redskins 47–14. **Drive: 6 plays, 18 yards, 3:49.**

**Top passers**

- NO – Drew Brees – 19/28, 209 yards, 2 TD, 2 INT
- WAS – Kirk Cousins – 20/25, 324 yards, 4 TD

**Top rushers**

- NO – Mark Ingram – 5 rushes, 77 yards
- WAS – Alfred Morris – 15 rushes, 92 yards

**Top receivers**

- NO – Brandin Cooks – 5 receptions, 98 yards, 2 TD
- WAS – Matt Jones – 3 receptions, 131 yards, TD

Kirk Cousins would have another great game, as he would throw four touchdowns in this game along with 324 passing yards, as the Redskins crushed the Saints 47–14. With the win, the Redskins improved to 4–5.

==== Week 11: at Carolina Panthers ====
Week Eleven: Washington Redskins at Carolina Panthers – Game summary

Quarter	1	2	3	4	Total
Redskins	14	0	0	2	**16**
**Panthers**	14	17	10	3	**44**

at Bank of America Stadium, Charlotte, North Carolina

- Date: November 22
- Game time: 1:00 pm. EST
- Game weather: Mostly sunny, 50 °F (10 °C)
- Game attendance: 74,000
- Referee: Jerome Boger
- TV announcers (Fox): Thom Brennaman, Charles Davis and Tony Siragusa
- Recap, Gamebook

The Redskins would be embarrassed 44–16 in Carolina against the undefeated Panthers. The Panthers would lead the entire game, and the Redskins suffered their worst loss of the season.

With the loss, Washington fell to 4–6, leaving the lead in the NFC East up for grabs.

==== Week 12: vs. New York Giants ====
Week Twelve: New York Giants at Washington Redskins – Game summary

Quarter	1	2	3	4	Total
Giants	0	0	0	14	**14**
**Redskins**	0	17	0	3	**20**

at FedExField, Landover, Maryland

- Date: November 29
- Game time: 1:00 pm. EST
- Game weather: Cloudy, 46 °F (8 °C)
- Game attendance: 77,367
- Referee: Carl Cheffers
- TV announcers (Fox): Kenny Albert, Daryl Johnston and Laura Okmin
- Recap, Gamebook

This contest broke a five-game losing streak to the Giants. In addition, the Redskins claimed first place in the division.

==== Week 13: vs. Dallas Cowboys ====
Week Thirteen: Dallas Cowboys at Washington Redskins – Game summary

Quarter	1	2	3	4	Total
**Cowboys**	0	3	3	13	**19**
Redskins	0	3	3	10	**16**

at FedExField, Landover, Maryland

- Date: December 7
- Game time: 8:30 pm. EST
- Game weather: Clear, 39 °F (4 °C)
- Game attendance: 80,444
- Referee: Walt Anderson
- TV announcers (ESPN): Mike Tirico, Jon Gruden and Lisa Salters
- Recap, Gamebook

Game information

**First quarter**

- No scoring plays

**Second quarter**

- DAL – Dan Bailey 38-yard field goal, 6:36. Cowboys 3–0. **Drive: 10 plays, 60 yards, 5:16.**
- WAS – Dustin Hopkins 45-yard field goal, 0:02. Tied 3–3. **Drive: 14 plays, 58 yards, 6:31.**

**Third quarter**

- WAS – Dustin Hopkins 36-yard field goal, 10:37. Redskins 6–3. **Drive: 6 plays, 23 yards, 3:07.**
- DAL – Dan Bailey 34-yard field goal, 3:39. Tied 6–6. **Drive: 11 plays, 64 yards, 6:59.**

**Fourth quarter**

- WAS – Dustin Hopkins 46-yard field goal, 14:19. Redskins 9–6. **Drive: 8 plays, 50 yards, 4:19.**
- DAL – Dan Bailey 20-yard field goal, 4:25. Tied 9–9. **Drive: 6 plays, 65 yards, 3:04.**
- DAL – Darren McFadden 6-yard run (Dan Bailey kick), 1:19. Cowboys 16–9. **Drive: 2 plays, 15 yards, 0:12.**
- WAS – DeSean Jackson 28-yard pass from Kirk Cousins (Dustin Hopkins kick), 0:49. Tied 16–16. **Drive: 4 plays, 43 yards, 0:30.**
- DAL – Dan Bailey 54-yard field goal, 0:14. Cowboys 19–16. **Drive: 5 plays, 20 yards, 0:35.**

**Top passers**

- DAL – Matt Cassel – 16/29, 223 yards
- WAS – Kirk Cousins – 22/31, 219 yards, TD

**Top rushers**

- DAL – Darren McFadden – 14 rushes, 53 yards, TD
- WAS – Matt Jones – 18 rushes, 49 yards

**Top receivers**

- DAL – Terrance Williams – 2 receptions, 63 yards
- WAS – DeSean Jackson – 6 receptions, 80 yards, TD

The Cowboys would win their fourth game of the season. The Redskins also suffered their third straight home loss to Dallas.

With the loss, the Redskins fell to 5–7, once again leaving the NFC East lead up for grabs.

==== Week 14: at Chicago Bears ====
Week Fourteen: Washington Redskins at Chicago Bears – Game summary

Quarter	1	2	3	4	Total
**Redskins**	7	7	7	3	**24**
Bears	0	7	14	0	**21**

at Soldier Field, Chicago, Illinois

- Date: December 13
- Game time: 1:00 pm. EST/12:00 p.m. CST
- Game weather: Cloudy, 62 °F (17 °C)
- Game attendance: 61,026
- Referee: Ron Torbert
- TV announcers (Fox): Kenny Albert, Daryl Johnston and Laura Okmin
- Recap, Gamebook

This was the Redskins' first road win of the season and second under Jay Gruden. This had been a problem during Gruden's time with the team.

==== Week 15: vs. Buffalo Bills ====
Week Fifteen: Buffalo Bills at Washington Redskins – Game summary

Quarter	1	2	3	4	Total
Bills	0	0	17	8	**25**
**Redskins**	7	14	7	7	**35**

at FedExField, Landover, Maryland

- Date: December 20
- Game time: 1:00 pm. EST
- Game weather: Sunny, 44 °F (7 °C)
- Game attendance: 80,124
- Referee: Clete Blakeman
- TV announcers (Fox): Kenny Albert, Daryl Johnston and Laura Okmin
- Recap, Gamebook

In a game that was cross-flexed, the Redskins would defeat the Buffalo Bills 35–25, getting their first and only win against an AFC opponent. With the win, the Redskins evened their record at 7–7. They also defeated the Bills for the first time since Super Bowl XXVI, as the Bills came into this game having won the last 6 games against Washington. As of the 2023 season, this currently remains Washington's latest victory over Buffalo.

==== Week 16: at Philadelphia Eagles ====
Week Sixteen: Washington Redskins at Philadelphia Eagles – Game summary

Quarter	1	2	3	4	Total
**Redskins**	13	3	14	8	**38**
Eagles	7	3	7	7	**24**

at Lincoln Financial Field, Philadelphia, Pennsylvania

- Date: December 26
- Game time: 8:25 pm. EST
- Game weather: Cloudy, 52 °F (11 °C)
- Game attendance: 69,596
- Referee: Walt Coleman
- TV announcers (NFLN): Ian Eagle, Trent Green and Evan Washburn
- Recap, Gamebook

With the win, the Redskins clinched the division title for the first time since 2012.

==== Week 17: at Dallas Cowboys ====
Week Seventeen: Washington Redskins at Dallas Cowboys – Game summary

Quarter	1	2	3	4	Total
**Redskins**	21	3	3	7	**34**
Cowboys	0	14	0	9	**23**

at AT&T Stadium, Arlington, Texas

- Date: January 3, 2016
- Game time: 1:00 pm. EST/12:00 pm. CST
- Game weather: None (retractable roof closed)
- Game attendance: 90,127
- Referee: John Parry
- TV announcers (Fox): Chris Myers, Ronde Barber and Jennifer Hale
- Recap, Gamebook

Game information

**First quarter**

- WAS – Ryan Grant 5-yard pass from Kirk Cousins (Dustin Hopkins kick), 9:14. Redskins 7–0. **Drive: 2 plays, 49 yards, 0:44.**
- WAS – Pierre Garcon 39-yard pass from Kirk Cousins (Dustin Hopkins kick), 4:28. Redskins 14–0. **Drive: 3 plays, 43 yards, 1:32.**
- WAS – Jamison Crowder 3-yard pass from Kirk Cousins (Dustin Hopkins kick), 0:24. Redskins 21–0. **Drive: 8 plays, 30 yards, 3:22.**

**Second quarter**

- WAS – Dustin Hopkins 27-yard field goal, 8:20. Redskins 24–0. **Drive: 8 plays, 68 yards, 4:18.**
- DAL – Jason Witten 4-yard pass from Kellen Moore (Dan Bailey kick), 3:39. Redskins 24–7. **Drive: 9 plays, 80 yards, 4:41.**
- DAL – Cole Beasley 5-yard pass from Kellen Moore (Dan Bailey kick), 0:26. Redskins 24–14. **Drive: 7 plays, 86 yards, 1:11.**

**Third quarter**

- WAS – Dustin Hopkins 33-yard field goal, 3:01. Redskins 27–14. **Drive: 14 plays, 74 yards, 8:21.**

**Fourth quarter**

- WAS – Rashad Ross 71-yard pass from Colt McCoy (Dustin Hopkins kick), 15:00. Redskins 34–14. **Drive: 3 plays, 72 yards, 1:32.**
- DAL – Alfred Morris tackled in the end zone by J. J. Wilcox and DeMarcus Lawrence for a safety, 12:27. Redskins 34–16.
- DAL – Cole Beasley 7-yard pass from Kellen Moore (Dan Bailey kick), 4:22. Redskins 34–23. **Drive: 12 plays, 89 yards, 3:32.**

**Top passers**

- WAS – Kirk Cousins – 12/15, 176 yards, 3 TD
- DAL – Kellen Moore – 33/48, 435 yards, 3 TD, 2 INT

**Top rushers**

- WAS – Alfred Morris – 19 rushes, 100 yards
- DAL – Darren McFadden – 12 rushes, 92 yards

**Top receivers**

- WAS – Jamison Crowder – 5 receptions, 109 yards, TD
- DAL – Terrance Williams – 8 receptions, 173 yards

Redskins fans would travel well for this game, and the Redskins powered out to a 24–0 lead during the second quarter. The Cowboys would try to come back, but they wouldn't, as the Redskins won 34–23.

With the win, the Redskins ended their season at 9–7, their first winning record since 2012.

This was Washington's final road win against the Cowboys under the "Redskins" name, as they retired the branding five years later.

== Postseason ==
=== Schedule ===
Round	Date	Opponent (seed)	Result	Record	Venue	Recap
Wild Card	January 10	Green Bay Packers (5)	L 18–35	0–1	FedExField	Recap

=== Game summaries ===
==== NFC Wild Card Playoffs: vs. (5) Green Bay Packers ====
NFC Wild Card Playoffs: (5) Green Bay Packers at (4) Washington Redskins – Game summary

Quarter	1	2	3	4	Total
Packers	0	17	7	11	35
Redskins	5	6	7	0	18

at FedExField, Landover, Maryland

- Date: January 10, 2016
- Game time: 4:40 p.m. EST
- Game weather: Cloudy, 61 °F (16 °C)
- Game attendance: 81,367
- Referee: Gene Steratore
- TV announcers (Fox): Joe Buck, Troy Aikman, Erin Andrews and Chris Myers
- Recap, Gamebook

Game information

First quarter

- WAS – Preston Smith sacked Aaron Rodgers in end zone for safety, 10:27. Redskins 2–0.
- WAS – Dustin Hopkins 25-yard field goal, 4:51. Redskins 5–0. Drive: 10 plays, 48 yards, 5:36.

Second quarter

- WAS – Jordan Reed 24-yard pass from Kirk Cousins (kick failed, hit right upright), 13:02. Redskins 11–0. Drive: 7 plays, 64 yards, 3:22.
- GB – Randall Cobb 12-yard pass from Aaron Rodgers (Mason Crosby kick), 9:04. Redskins 11–7. Drive: 9 plays, 80 yards, 3:58.
- GB – Mason Crosby 43-yard field goal, 2:54. Redskins 11–10. Drive: 7 plays, 30 yards, 3:04.
- GB – Davante Adams 10-yard pass from Aaron Rodgers (Mason Crosby kick), 0:28. Packers 17–11. Drive: 9 plays, 60 yards, 1:54.

Third quarter

- WAS – Kirk Cousins 3-yard run (Dustin Hopkins kick), 9:41. Redskins 18–17. Drive: 9 plays, 73 yards, 5:19.
- GB – James Starks 4-yard run (Mason Crosby kick), 4:12. Packers 24–18. Drive: 11 plays, 80 yards, 5:29.

Fourth quarter

- GB – Eddie Lacy 2-yard run (Aaron Rodgers–Jared Abbrederis pass), 12:23. Packers 32–18. Drive: 10 plays, 76 yards, 5:39.
- GB – Mason Crosby 29-yard field goal, 4:39. Packers 35–18. Drive: 4 plays, 6 yards, 0:19.

Top passers

- GB – Aaron Rodgers – 21/36, 210 yards, 2 TD
- WAS – Kirk Cousins – 29/46, 329 yards, TD

Top rushers

- GB – Eddie Lacy – 12 rushes, 63 yards, TD
- WAS – Alfred Morris – 11 rushes, 50 yards

Top receivers

- GB – James Jones – 7 receptions, 81 yards
- WAS – Jordan Reed – 9 receptions, 120 yards, TD

The Redskins, favored by 1, struggled in the second half, letting Green Bay end the game on a run of 17 unanswered points. The Redskins offense turned the ball over late and failed to convert a fourth down in their own territory with 5 minutes to play. Mason Crosby then kicked a field goal, putting the game out of reach.

This was Washington's final playoff appearance as the Redskins, as the controversial moniker was retired five years later. They would not appear in the postseason again until 2020.

== Standings ==
=== Division ===
NFC East
	W	L	T	PCT	DIV	CONF	PF	PA	STK
^{(4)} Washington Redskins	9	7	0	.563	4–2	8–4	388	379	W4
Philadelphia Eagles	7	9	0	.438	3–3	4–8	377	430	W1
New York Giants	6	10	0	.375	2–4	4–8	420	442	L3
Dallas Cowboys	4	12	0	.250	3–3	3–9	275	374	L4

=== Conference ===
NFC
#	Team	Division	W	L	T	PCT	DIV	CONF	SOS	SOV	STK
Division Leaders
1	Carolina Panthers	South	15	1	0	.938	5–1	11–1	.441	.438	W1
2	Arizona Cardinals	West	13	3	0	.813	4–2	10–2	.477	.457	L1
3	Minnesota Vikings	North	11	5	0	.688	5–1	8–4	.504	.449	W3
4	Washington Redskins	East	9	7	0	.563	4–2	8–4	.465	.403	W4
Wild Cards
5 (Note: Green Bay finished ahead of Seattle based on head-to-head victory.)	Green Bay Packers	North	10	6	0	.625	3–3	7–5	.531	.450	L2
6	Seattle Seahawks	West	10	6	0	.625	3–3	7–5	.520	.431	W1
Did not qualify for the postseason
7	Atlanta Falcons	South	8	8	0	.500	1–5	5–7	.480	.453	L1
8 (Note: St. Louis and Detroit finished ahead of Philadelphia and New Orleans based on conference record. St. Louis finished ahead of Detroit based on head-to-head victory. Detroit finished ahead of Philadelphia and New Orleans based on head-to-head sweep, while Philadelphia finished ahead of New Orleans based on head-to-head victory.)	St. Louis Rams	West	7	9	0	.438	4–2	6–6	.527	.482	L1
9	Detroit Lions	North	7	9	0	.438	3–3	6–6	.535	.429	W3
10	Philadelphia Eagles	East	7	9	0	.438	3–3	4–8	.508	.473	W1
11	New Orleans Saints	South	7	9	0	.438	3–3	5–7	.504	.402	W2
12 (Note: The New York Giants and Chicago each finished ahead of Tampa Bay based on head-to-head victory, while the Giants finished ahead of Chicago based on conference record.)	New York Giants	East	6	10	0	.375	2–4	4–8	.500	.396	L3
13	Chicago Bears	North	6	10	0	.375	1–5	3–9	.547	.469	L1
14	Tampa Bay Buccaneers	South	6	10	0	.375	3–3	5–7	.484	.406	L4
15	San Francisco 49ers	West	5	11	0	.313	1–5	4–8	.539	.463	W1
16	Dallas Cowboys	East	4	12	0	.250	3–3	3–9	.531	.438	L4
Tiebreakers (Note: When breaking ties for three or more teams under the NFL's rules, they are first broken within divisions, then comparing only the highest-ranked remaining team from each division.)
