= Trenton Robinson =

American football player (born 1990)

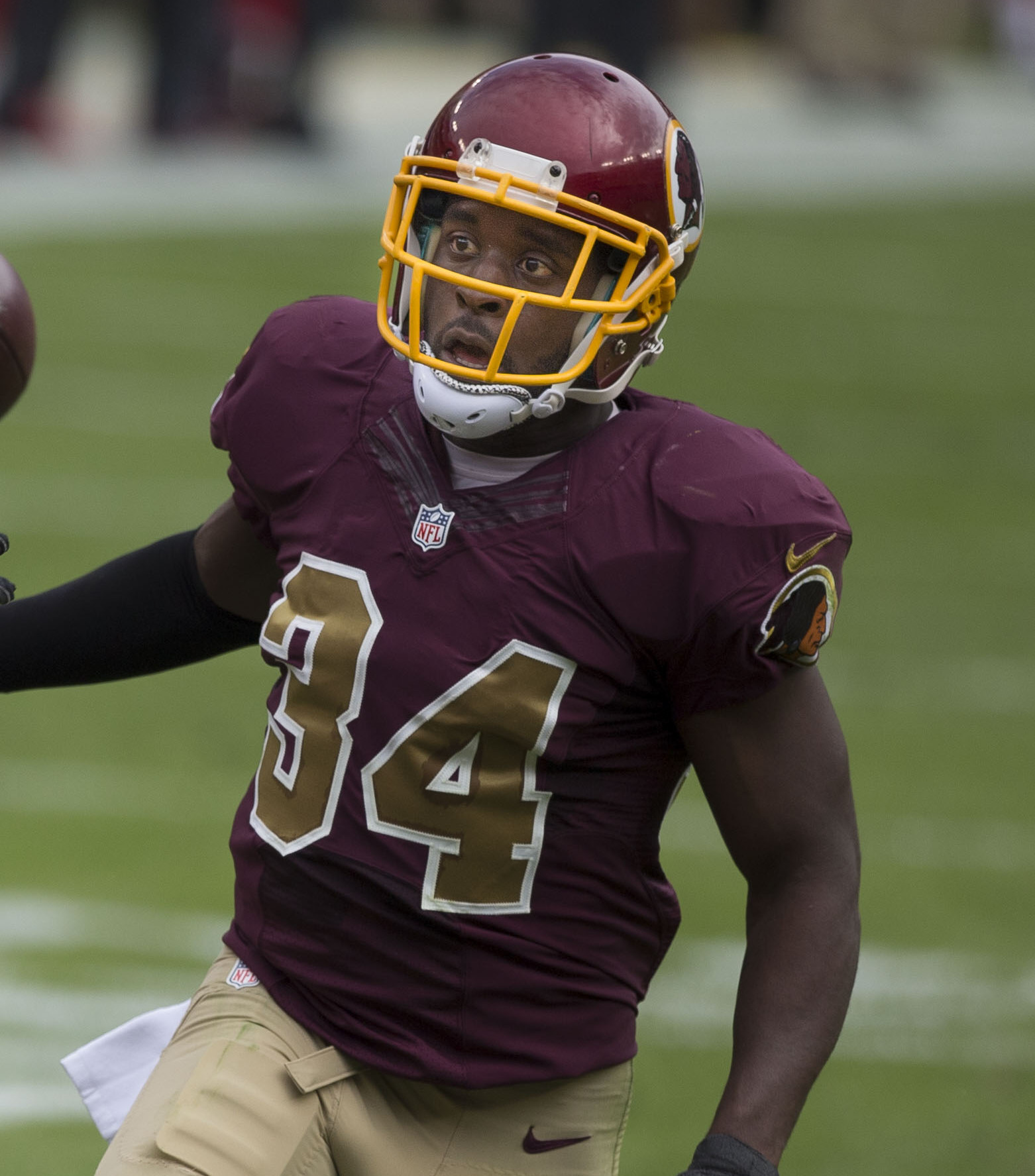
- Robinson with the Washington Redskins in 2015

No. 30, 34
- Position: Safety

Personal information
- Born: February 16, 1990 (age 36); Bay City, Michigan, U.S.
- Listed height: 5 ft 9 in (1.75 m)
- Listed weight: 195 lb (88 kg)

Career information
- High school: Central (Bay City)
- College: Michigan State
- NFL draft: 2012: 6th round, 180th overall pick

Career history
- San Francisco 49ers (2012); Philadelphia Eagles (2013)*; Washington Redskins (2013–2015); Carolina Panthers (2016)*
- * Offseason or practice squad member only

Awards and highlights
- First-team All-Big Ten (2011); Second-team All-Big Ten (2010)

Career NFL statistics
- Total tackles: 88
- Fumble recoveries: 1
- Pass deflections: 4
- Interceptions: 2
- Stats at Pro Football Reference

Trenton Robinson (born February 16, 1990) is an American former professional football player who was a safety in the National Football League (NFL). He played college football for the Michigan State Spartans and was selected by the San Francisco 49ers in the sixth round of the 2012 NFL draft.

He was also a member of the Philadelphia Eagles, Washington Redskins, and Carolina Panthers.

== College career ==
Robinson attended Michigan State University from 2008 to 2011. During his collegiate career, he started 32 of 46 games and recorded 229 tackles and nine interceptions. In the 2011 season, he was voted as a team captain along with quarterback Kirk Cousins.

== Professional career ==
Pre-draft measurables
Height	Weight	Arm length	Hand span	40-yard dash	10-yard split	20-yard split	20-yard shuttle	Vertical jump	Broad jump	Bench press
5 ft 10 in (1.78 m)	195 lb (88 kg)	31 1/2 in (0.80 m)	9 3/4 in (0.25 m)	4.52 s	1.50 s	2.55 s	4.15 s	35.0 in (0.89 m)	10 ft 5 in (3.18 m)	15 reps
Values from NFL Combine

=== San Francisco 49ers ===
Robinson was selected in the sixth round with the 180th overall pick of the 2012 NFL draft by the San Francisco 49ers. He made his NFL debut in the Week 1 win against the Green Bay Packers.

The 49ers released him on August 31, 2013.

=== Philadelphia Eagles ===
Robinson was signed to the practice squad of the Philadelphia Eagles on September 2, 2013. He was released by the Eagles on October 8.

=== Washington Redskins ===
The Washington Redskins signed Robinson on October 15, 2013.

In the Week 2 win against the Jacksonville Jaguars, he recorded his first career interception on quarterback Chad Henne.

Robinson re-signed with the Redskins on March 10, 2015. Despite primarily being the backup free safety, he was promoted to the starting strong safety after Duke Ihenacho was placed on the team's injured reserve. In Week 5, he recorded the team's first interception of the 2015 season against Atlanta Falcons quarterback Matt Ryan, which was the second of Robinson's career. On December 5, 2015, Robinson was waived/injured by the Redskins, and went to the injured reserve list the following day. He was released with an injury settlement on December 15.

=== Carolina Panthers ===
Robinson signed with the Carolina Panthers on March 21, 2016.
