= Tevin Mitchel =

American football player (born 1992)

No. 37
- Position: Cornerback

Personal information
- Born: August 3, 1992 (age 34); Little Rock, Arkansas, U.S.
- Listed height: 6 ft 0 in (1.83 m)
- Listed weight: 192 lb (87 kg)

Career information
- High school: Mansfield Legacy (Mansfield, Texas)
- College: Arkansas
- NFL draft: 2015: 6th round, 182nd overall pick

Career history
- Washington Redskins (2015)*; Indianapolis Colts (2015–2017); Oakland Raiders (2017–2018); Hamilton Tiger-Cats (2019); Saskatchewan Roughriders (2020)*
- * Offseason or practice squad member only
- Stats at Pro Football Reference

Tevin Mitchel (born August 3, 1992) is an American former professional football cornerback. He was selected by the Washington Redskins in the sixth round of the 2015 NFL draft. He played college football at the University of Arkansas.

== Professional career ==
=== Washington Redskins ===
In the 2015 NFL draft, the Washington Redskins had three picks in the sixth round of the 2015 NFL Draft. The Redskins drafted Mitchel with their second sixth round pick. He would join his college teammate, linebacker Martrell Spaight, who was drafted earlier in the fifth round. He signed a four-year, $2.4 million contract on May 11, 2015. After tearing the labrum in his left shoulder, the Redskins waived/injured him on August 5, 2015.

=== Indianapolis Colts ===
A day after being waived/injured by the Redskins, Mitchel was claimed by the Indianapolis Colts on August 6, 2015.

On September 3, 2016, Mitchel was placed on injured reserve. On September 9, he was released from the Colts' injured reserve with an injury settlement. He was re-signed to the practice squad on November 1, 2016. He signed a reserve/future contract with the Colts on January 2, 2017.

On August 23, 2017, Mitchel was waived/injured by the Colts and placed on injured reserve. He was released on September 26, 2017.

=== Oakland Raiders ===
On October 24, 2017, Mitchel was signed to the Oakland Raiders' practice squad. He signed a reserve/future contract with the Raiders on January 2, 2018. He was waived/injured on August 21, 2018, and was placed on injured reserve.

=== Hamilton Tiger-Cats ===
Mitchel signed with the Hamilton Tiger-Cats of the Canadian Football League (CFL) on May 7, 2019. He was released on March 4, 2020.

=== Saskatchewan Roughriders ===
Mitchel signed with the Saskatchewan Roughriders of the CFL on March 6, 2020. After the CFL canceled the 2020 season due to the COVID-19 pandemic, Mitchel chose to opt-out of his contract with the Roughriders on August 28, 2020.

== Personal life ==
Mitchel's father, Eric, is a retired quarterback that was drafted 165th overall by the New England Patriots in the 1989 NFL draft.
