= Jordan Reed =

American football player (born 1990)

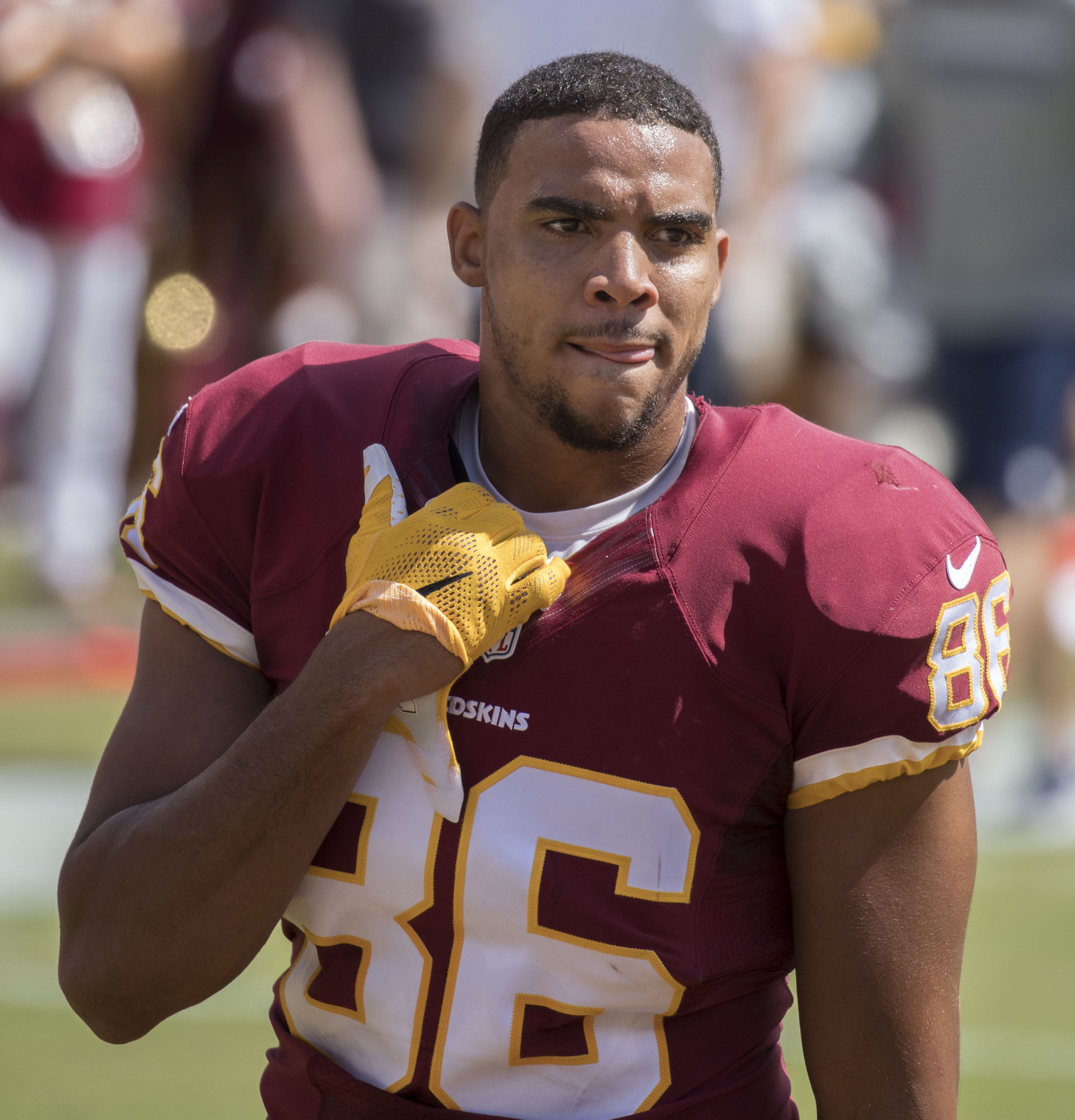
- Reed with the Washington Redskins in 2016

No. 86, 81
- Position: Tight end

Personal information
- Born: July 3, 1990 (age 36); New Britain, Connecticut, U.S.
- Listed height: 6 ft 2 in (1.88 m)
- Listed weight: 242 lb (110 kg)

Career information
- High school: New London (New London, Connecticut)
- College: Florida (2009-2012)
- NFL draft: 2013: 3rd round, 85th overall pick

Career history
- Washington Redskins (2013–2019); San Francisco 49ers (2020)

Awards and highlights
- Pro Bowl (2016); PFWA All-Rookie Team (2013); First-team All-SEC (2012)

Career NFL statistics
- Receptions: 355
- Receiving yards: 3,602
- Receiving touchdowns: 28
- Stats at Pro Football Reference

Jordan Reed (born July 3, 1990) is an American former professional football player who was a tight end in the National Football League (NFL). He played college football for the Florida Gators and was selected by the Washington Redskins in the third round of the 2013 NFL draft. With the Redskins, he was considered to be among the best at his position before multiple injuries led to him being released. He played his final season for the San Francisco 49ers in 2020 before retiring due to concussion-related health issues.

== Early life ==
Reed was born in New Britain, Connecticut, but attended New London High School. As a junior, he completed 122 of 222 passes for 1,706 yards and 38 touchdowns. He threw only two interceptions, and also rushed for 370 yards and eight touchdowns. He led New London to an undefeated regular season in 2007, and was a finalist for the 2008 Joe Montana High School Quarterback of the Year. Considered a four-star recruit by Rivals.com, he was rated the 10th best dual-threat quarterback in the nation. Reed committed to Florida over offers from Boston College, Connecticut, Duke, Iowa, Oregon, and Tennessee.

== College career ==
Reed accepted an athletic scholarship to attend the University of Florida, where he played for coach Urban Meyer and coach Will Muschamp's Florida Gators football teams from 2009 to 2012. Originally recruited as a quarterback, he did not appear in any games and was redshirted as a true freshman in 2009. After the 2009 season, he shifted to the tight end position. Reed finished his college career with 78 receptions for 938 yards and six touchdowns. He decided to forgo his final season of college eligibility, and enter the NFL Draft after the 2012 season.

== Professional career ==
Pre-draft measurables
Height	Weight	Arm length	Hand span	Wingspan	40-yard dash	10-yard split	20-yard split	Bench press
6 ft 2 1/2 in (1.89 m)	236 lb (107 kg)	33 in (0.84 m)	10 in (0.25 m)	6 ft 6 3/8 in (1.99 m)	4.72 s	1.66 s	2.76 s	16 reps
All values from NFL Combine

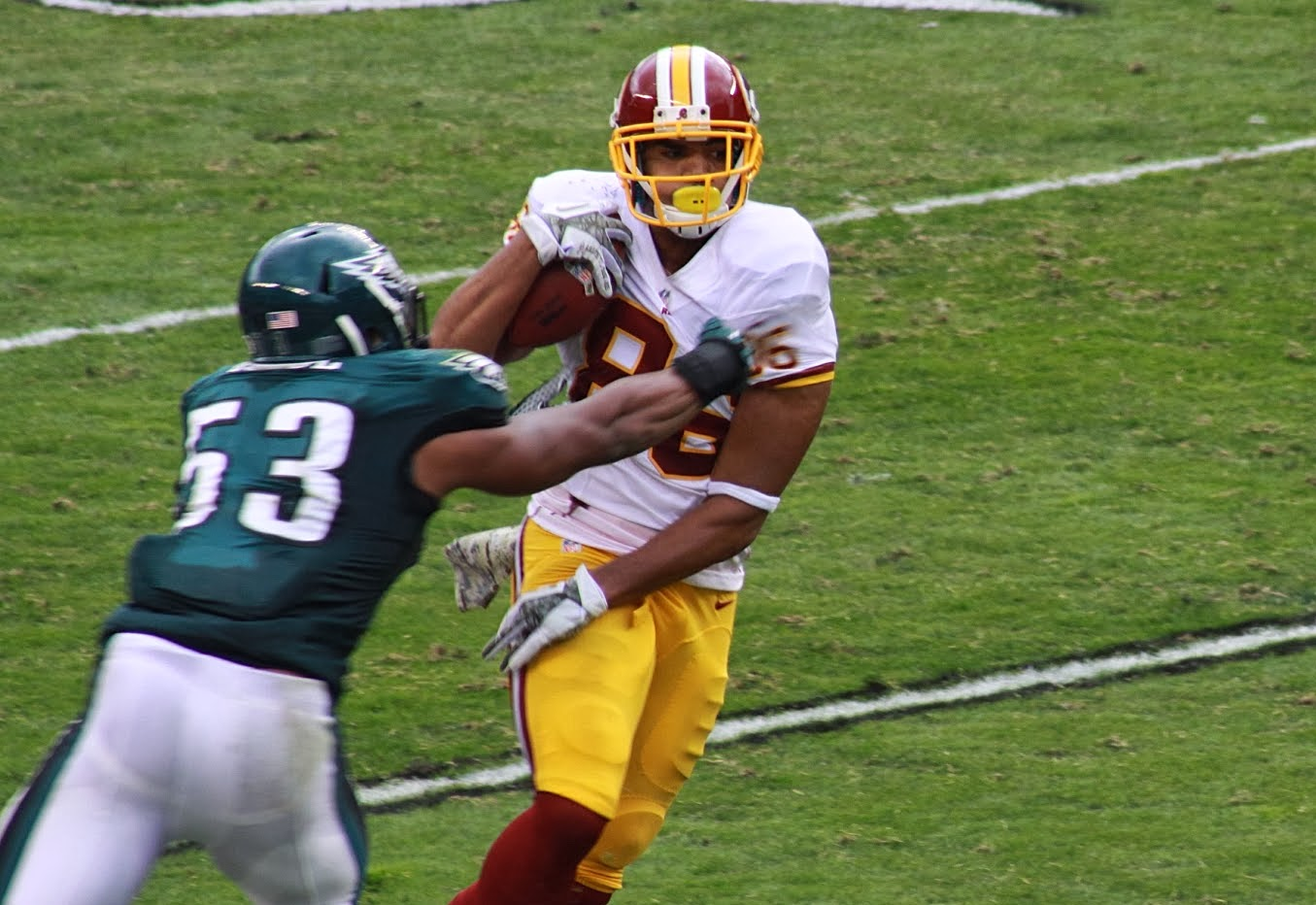
Reed during a game against the Philadelphia Eagles in 2013

=== Washington Redskins ===
==== 2013 season ====
Reed was selected in the third round, 85th overall pick, by the Washington Redskins in the 2013 NFL draft. On May 24, 2013, he officially signed a four-year rookie contract with the team.

On September 15, 2013, Reed recorded his first career touchdown against the Green Bay Packers. This touchdown made him the first Redskins rookie to score a touchdown in the first two games of his career since tight end Chris Cooley in 2004. On October 20, Reed recorded a career-high nine receptions for a career-high 134 yards and a touchdown against the Chicago Bears, setting a new Redskins franchise record for receiving yards by a rookie tight end, as well as recording his first 100-plus yard game. On November 11, Reed was pulled out of the game early after suffering a concussion in a game against the Philadelphia Eagles. After missing four consecutive games due to headaches after the concussion, he was placed on injured reserve on December 19. Despite playing only nine games, with four starts, in his first season, Reed was named to Pro Football Weekly/Pro Football Writers of America all-rookie team.

==== 2014 season ====
On September 7, 2014, Reed exited the season opener against the Houston Texans with a hamstring injury. Reed was sidelined for four more games until Week 6. On October 12, Reed caught eight passes for 92 yards against the Arizona Cardinals. On November 16, Reed suffered another hamstring injury during the game against the Tampa Bay Buccaneers. The injury sat Reed out for the team's Week 12 game against the San Francisco 49ers. On November 30, Reed caught nine passes for a 123 yards against the Indianapolis Colts, for his second 100-plus game of his career.

==== 2015 season ====
On September 13, 2015, Reed caught seven passes for 63 yards and his first touchdown of the season against the Miami Dolphins, a four-yarder. On October 25, Reed caught a career-high 11 passes for 72 yards and a career-high two touchdowns against the Tampa Bay Buccaneers. The touchdowns were from 3 and 6 yards out, respectively. On November 15, Reed caught two more touchdowns against the New Orleans Saints, a 16-yard reception and an 8-yard reception. On November 29, Reed caught 8 passes for 98 yards against the New York Giants. On December 13, Reed caught 9 passes for 120 yards and a touchdown against the Chicago Bears for his 3rd 100-plus yard game of his career. On December 20, Reed caught seven passes for 84 yards against the Buffalo Bills. Reed caught two touchdowns for the third time on the season, one from 3 yards out, and the other from 18 yards out. On December 26, Reed recorded 129 yards off of nine receptions and two touchdowns against the Philadelphia Eagles to win the NFC East. In his first playoff game, Reed recorded nine catches for 120 yards and one touchdown against the Green Bay Packers. He was ranked 77th on the NFL Top 100 Players of 2016.

==== 2016 season ====
On May 5, 2016, Reed signed a five-year contract extension with Washington, worth $50 million, including $22 million guaranteed. On October 2, Reed caught nine passes for 73 yards and two touchdowns against the Cleveland Browns. Reed scored two touchdowns in a single game for the 5th time in his career. Reed became the fastest tight end in NFL history to reach 200 career receptions. On October 13, Reed was diagnosed with a concussion and was sidelined for two games until Week 8. On October 30, Reed caught nine passes for 99 yards and a touchdown against the Cincinnati Bengals, his 17th touchdown of his career. On November 20, Reed caught five passes for 79 yards against the Green Bay Packers. Reed's 231 career receptions passed Rod Gardner (227) for 15th on the Redskins' all-time receptions list. On November 24, Reed caught a season-high ten passes for 95 yards and two touchdowns against the Dallas Cowboys. Reed recorded a 5-yard touchdown and an 8-yard touchdown, scoring his fourth and fifth touchdown of the season (18th and 19th career). During the game, Reed suffered a Grade 3 AC joint separation in his left shoulder, keeping him out of the team's Week 13 matchup against the Arizona Cardinals. On December 20, in a loss to the Carolina Panthers, Reed was ejected after punching Panthers safety Kurt Coleman in the helmet; the subsequent penalty pushed Washington out of the red zone and forced them to make a field goal instead. On December 20, Reed was named to the 2017 Pro Bowl roster, which was his first career Pro Bowl nomination. He was also ranked 65th on the NFL Top 100 Players of 2017.

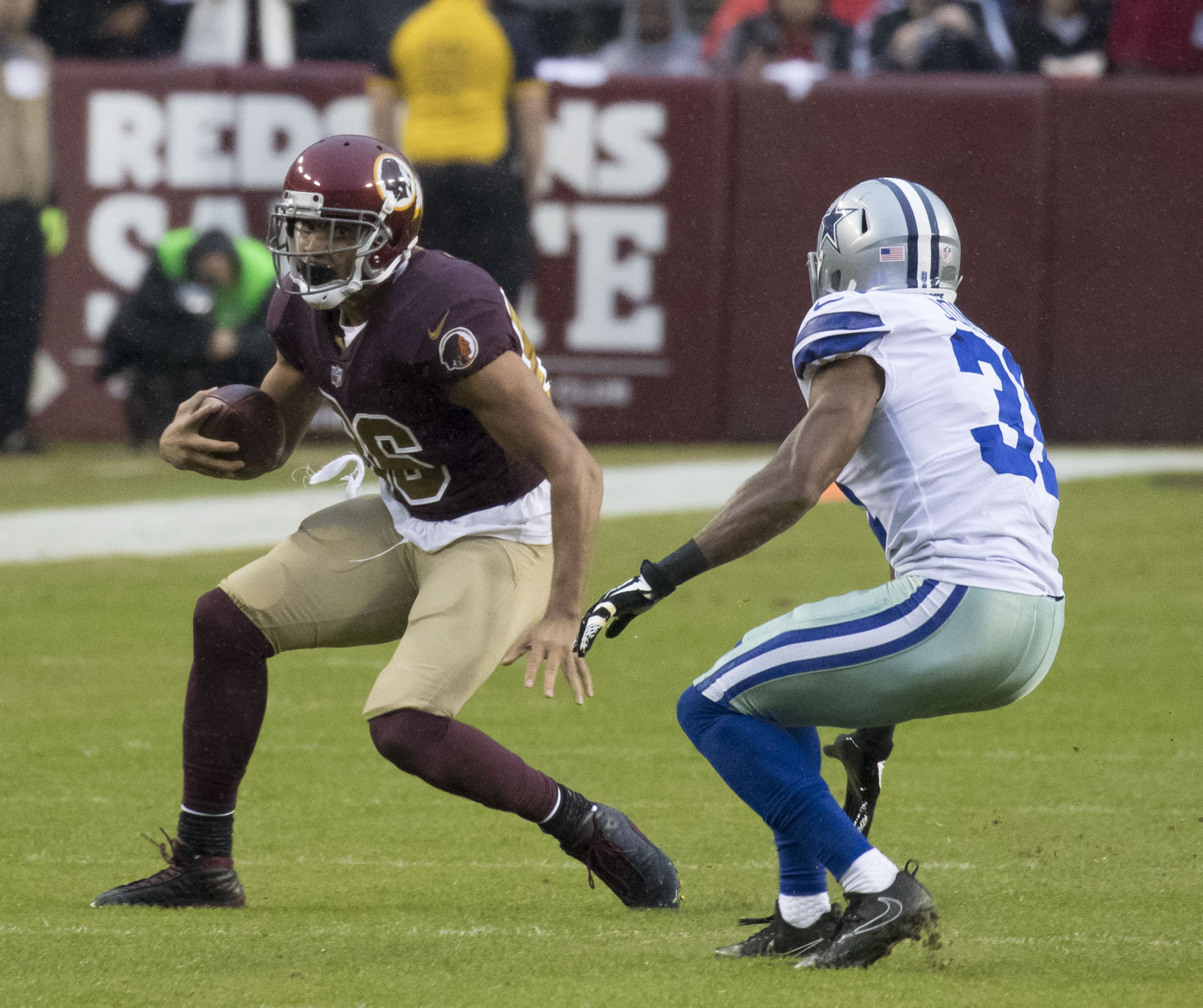
Jordan Reed in a game against the Dallas Cowboys in 2017

==== 2017 season ====
Missing the majority of the 2017 season while dealing with a hamstring injury, Reed was placed on injured reserve on December 12, 2017. He finished the season with 27 receptions, 211 yards, and two touchdowns over six games.

==== 2018 season ====
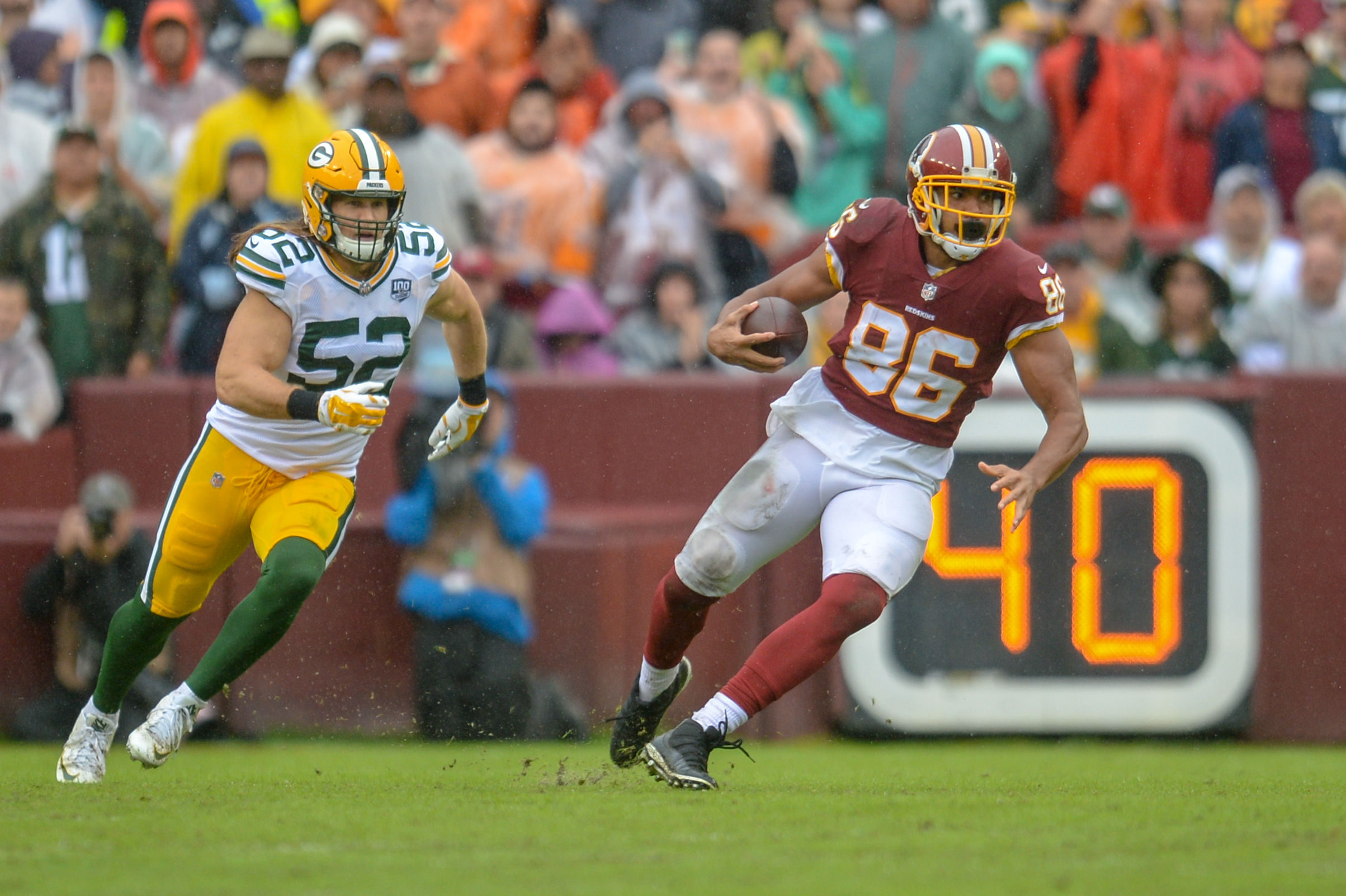
Reed against Clay Matthews of the Packers in 2018

In 2018, Reed had 54 catches for 558 yards and two touchdowns. He suffered a toe injury in Week 14, missing the next two games before being placed on injured reserve on December 27, 2018.

==== 2019 season ====
Reed suffered a concussion, the seventh of his career, during Washington's third preseason game after a hit delivered by Atlanta Falcons safety Keanu Neal. After missing the first five games of the regular season, Reed was placed on injured reserve. On February 17, 2020, it was reported that he was still in the league's concussion protocol. Reed was released by the Redskins three days later.

=== San Francisco 49ers ===
On August 9, 2020, Reed signed a one-year contract with the San Francisco 49ers. In Week 2 against the New York Jets, Reed caught seven passes for 50 yards and his first two touchdowns as a 49er during the 31–13 victory. He was placed on injured reserve on October 3, with a sprained MCL. He was activated on November 5.

Reed announced his retirement on April 20, 2021, citing health issues from the multiple concussions that he sustained during his career.

== NFL career statistics ==
=== Regular season ===
Year	Team	GP	Receiving						Fumbles	
Year	Team	GP	Rec	Tgts	Yds	Avg	Lng	TD	Fum	Lost
2013	WAS	9	45	59	499	11.1	38	3	0	0
2014	WAS	11	50	65	465	9.3	30	0	1	1
2015	WAS	14	87	114	952	10.9	32	11	3	2
2016	WAS	12	66	89	686	10.4	33	6	1	1
2017	WAS	6	27	35	211	7.8	20	2	1	0
2018	WAS	13	54	84	558	10.3	34	2	1	1
2019	WAS	0	Did not play due to injury							
2020	SF	10	26	46	231	8.9	26	4	0	0
Career		75	355	492	3,602	10.2	38	28	7	5

=== Postseason ===
Year	Team	GP	Receiving						Fumbles	
Year	Team	GP	Rec	Tgts	Yds	Avg	Lng	TD	Fum	Lost
2015	WAS	1	9	17	120	13.3	24	1	0	0
Career		1	9	17	120	13.3	24	1	0	0

== Personal life ==
Reed is the younger brother of former wide receiver David Reed, who was drafted in the fifth round of 2010 NFL draft by the Baltimore Ravens.

Reed says cannabis helped him deal with pain during his football career, and that he is pursuing business opportunities in the cannabis industry following his retirement from football. He further explained his decision in a USA Today op-ed, stating: "I want to broker change in how cannabis is perceived, how it's prescribed, how it's researched, how it's accessed, and how it can bring about lasting change for Americans from all walks of life".

On Season 7 of Below Deck: Mediterranean, Reed lost a chain while out jet-skiing off the coast of Malta. His friend suggested the chain was worth more than a standard house. After asking for it to be searched for, the crew of the yacht advised that it would not be possible.
