= Martrell Spaight =

American football player (born 1993)

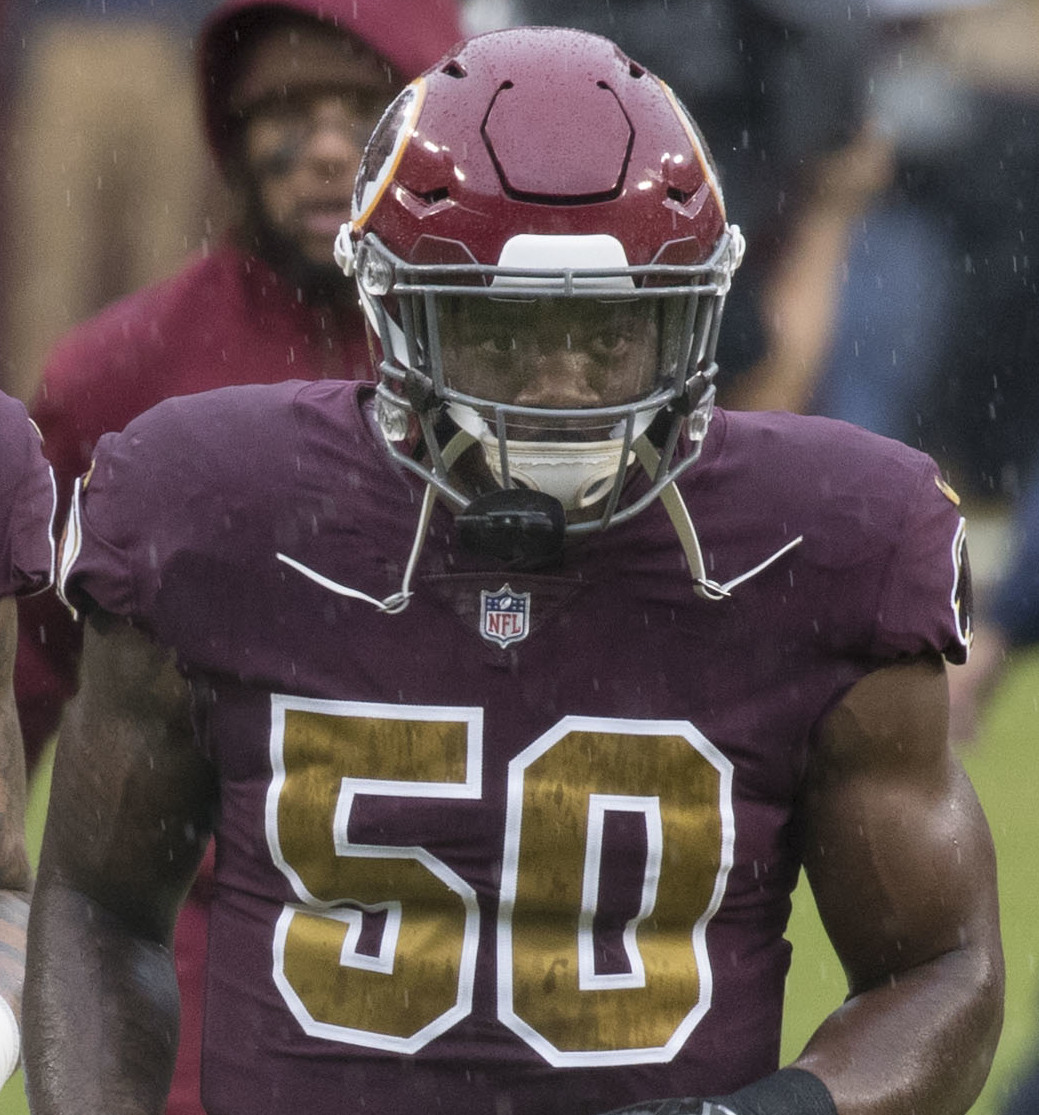
- Spaight with the Washington Redskins in 2017

No. 50, 53, 47
- Position: Linebacker

Personal information
- Born: August 5, 1993 (age 33); North Little Rock, Arkansas, U.S.
- Listed height: 6 ft 0 in (1.83 m)
- Listed weight: 238 lb (108 kg)

Career information
- High school: North Little Rock
- College: Arkansas
- NFL draft: 2015: 5th round, 141st overall pick

Career history
- Washington Redskins (2015–2017); Miami Dolphins (2018); Jacksonville Jaguars (2018); Kansas City Chiefs (2019)*; Massachusetts Pirates (2021); Vegas Vipers (2023)
- * Offseason or practice squad member only

Awards and highlights
- First-team All-SEC (2014)

Career NFL statistics
- Total tackles: 107
- Pass deflections: 3
- Interceptions: 1
- Stats at Pro Football Reference

Martrell Spaight (born August 5, 1993) is an American former professional football player who was a linebacker in the National Football League (NFL). He was selected by the Washington Redskins in the fifth round of the 2015 NFL draft. He played college football for the Arkansas Razorbacks. He was also a member of the Miami Dolphins, Jacksonville Jaguars, Kansas City Chiefs, Massachusetts Pirates and Vegas Vipers.

== College career ==
Spaight played college football at the University of Arkansas.

=== Statistics ===
Year	Team	GP	Defense				
Year	Team	GP	Tackles	For Loss	Sacks	Int	FF
2013	Arkansas	7	22	1.0	1.0	0	0
2014	Arkansas	13	128	10.5	1.0	1	2
Totals		20	150	11.5	2.0	1	2

== Professional career ==
=== Washington Redskins ===
The Washington Redskins selected Spaight in the fifth round with the 141st overall pick in the 2015 NFL draft. Despite playing outside linebacker in college, he switched to the inside linebacker position in the Redskins' defensive scheme. He signed a four-year contract on May 11, 2015. On September 22, the team placed him on injured reserve due to lingering symptoms after sustaining a concussion in the Week 1 game against the Miami Dolphins.

Spaight recorded his first career interception against quarterback Brett Hundley in the Week 11 victory over the Green Bay Packers in 2016.

On September 1, 2018, Spaight was released by the Redskins.

=== Miami Dolphins ===
Spaight signed with the Dolphins on September 25, 2018. He was released on November 9, 2018.

=== Jacksonville Jaguars ===
On November 13, 2018, Spaight was signed by the Jacksonville Jaguars. He was released on December 28, 2018.

=== Kansas City Chiefs ===
On January 4, 2019, Spaight signed a reserve/future contract with the Kansas City Chiefs.

Spaight announced his retirement from the NFL on May 20, 2019.

=== Massachusetts Pirates ===
Spaight signed with the Massachusetts Pirates of the Indoor Football League (IFL) for the 2021 season. Spaight was named to the 2021 All-IFL second-team during the season where he recorded 71 tackles, 3.5 sacks and 5 pass breakups. On March 10, 2022, Spaight was released by the Pirates.

=== Vegas Vipers ===
Spaight signed with the Vegas Vipers of the XFL on February 13, 2023. The Vipers folded when the XFL and United States Football League merged to create the United Football League (UFL).
