= List of Florida Gators in the NFL draft =

The Florida Gators football program is a college football team which represents the University of Florida. The Florida Gators compete in the NCAA Division I Football Bowl Subdivision (FBS) of the National Collegiate Athletic Association (NCAA), and the Eastern Division of the Southeastern Conference (SEC). Over 400 players have been drafted in the National Football League Draft, with 29 of them making a Pro Bowl, and 2 of those players making it to the Pro Football Hall of Fame.

== Key ==
B	Back	K	Kicker	NT	Nose tackle
C	Center	LB	Linebacker	FB	Fullback
DB	Defensive back	P	Punter	HB	Halfback
DE	Defensive end	QB	Quarterback	WR	Wide receiver
DT	Defensive tackle	RB	Running back	G	Guard
E	End	T	Offensive tackle	TE	Tight end

= Pro Bowler
= Hall of Famer

== Selections ==
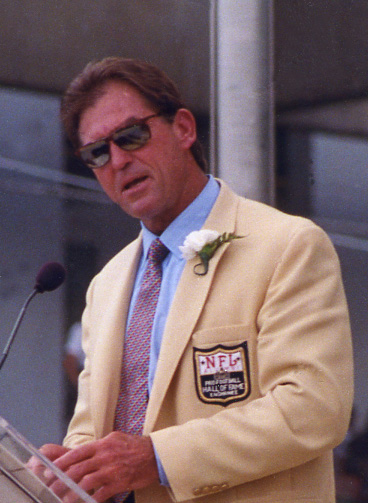
Jack Youngblood

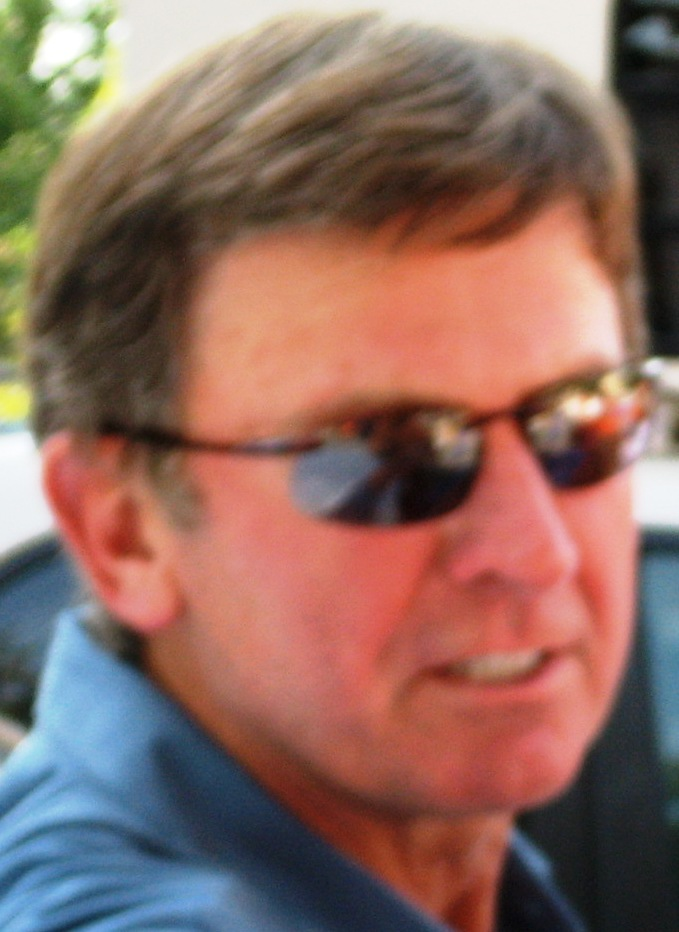
Steve Spurrier

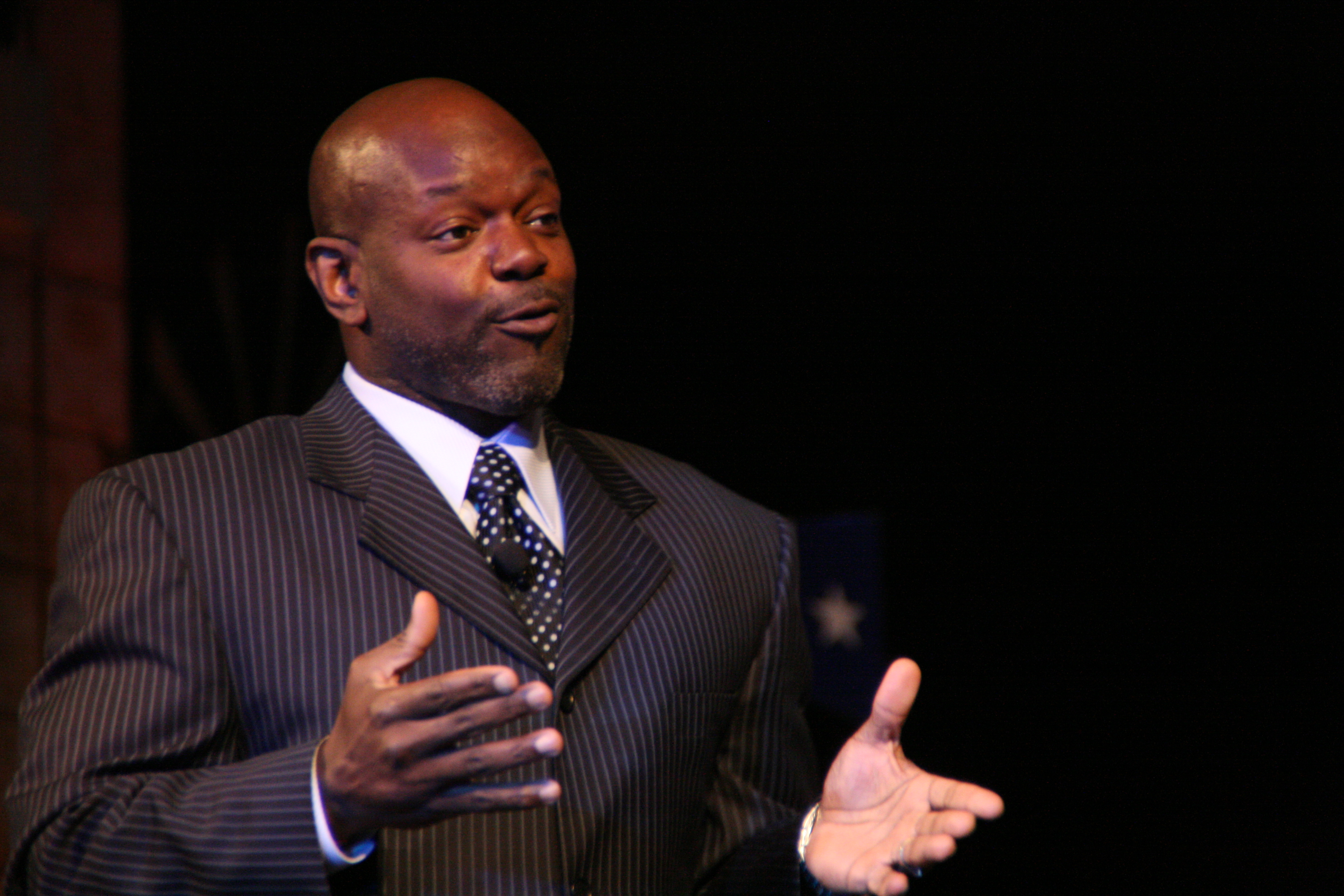
Emmitt Smith

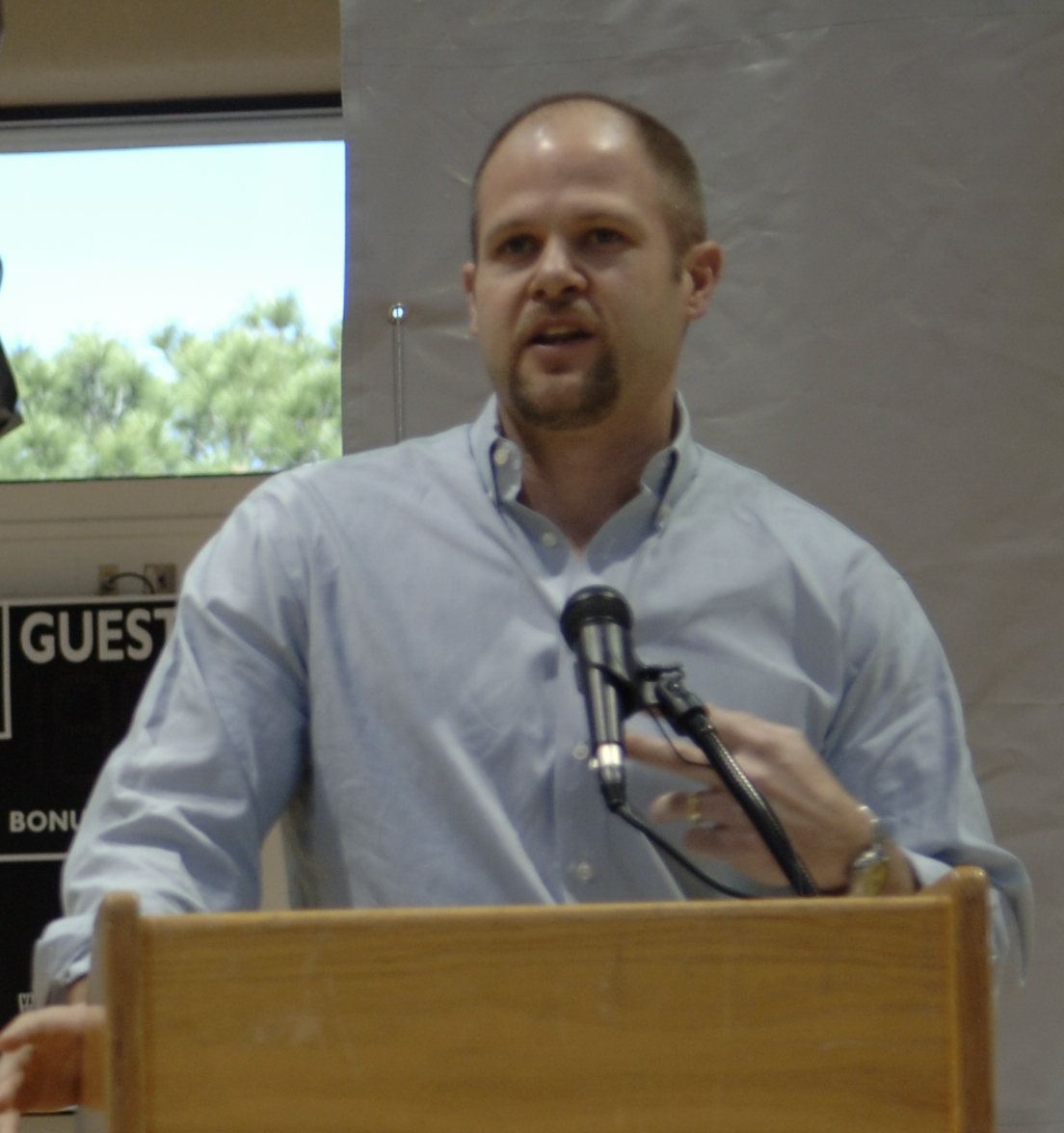
Danny Wuerffel

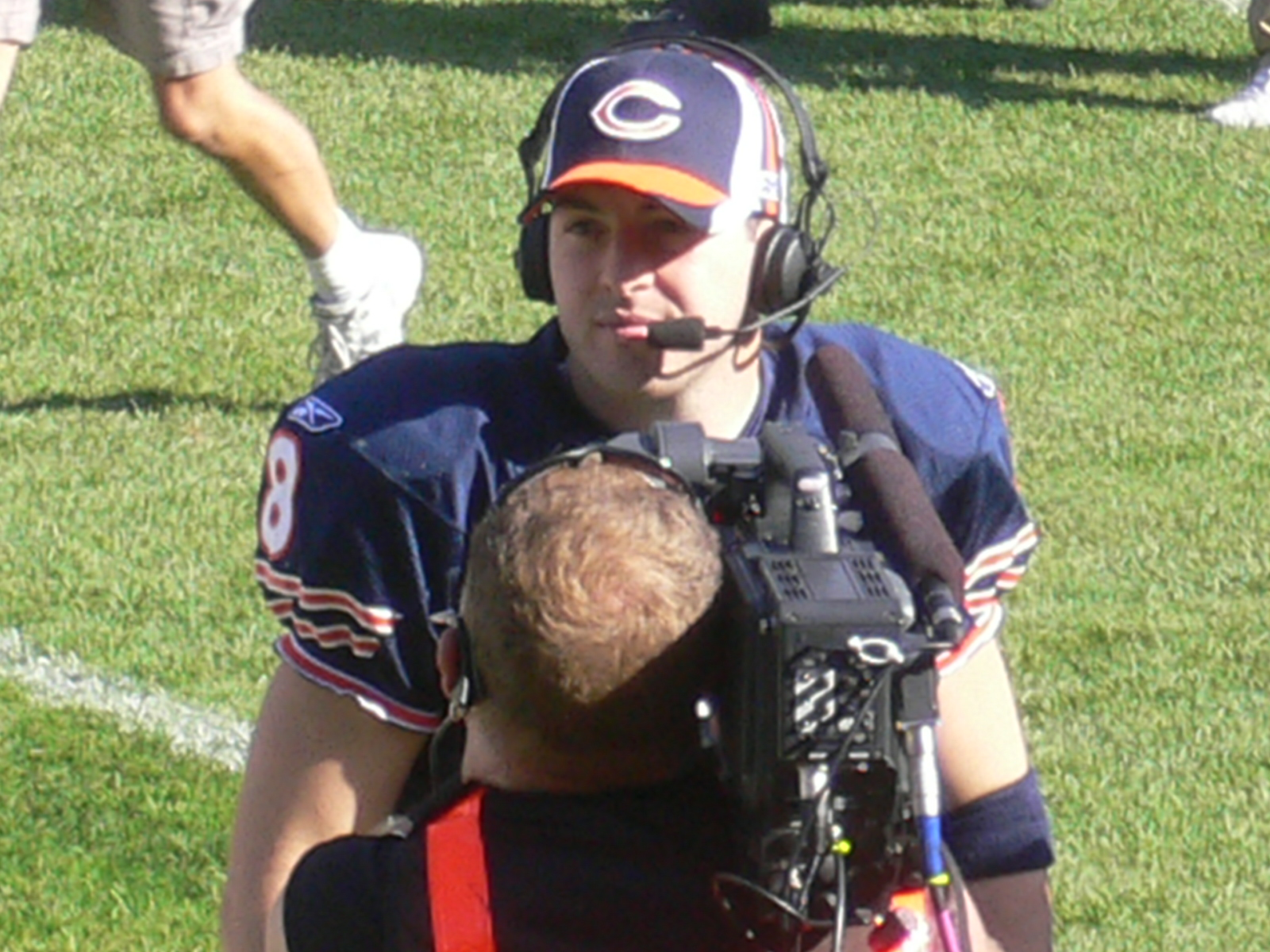
Rex Grossman

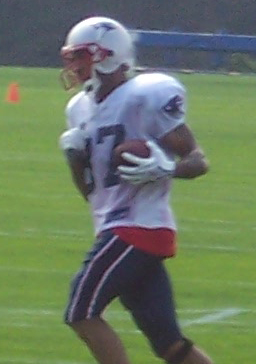
Reche Caldwell

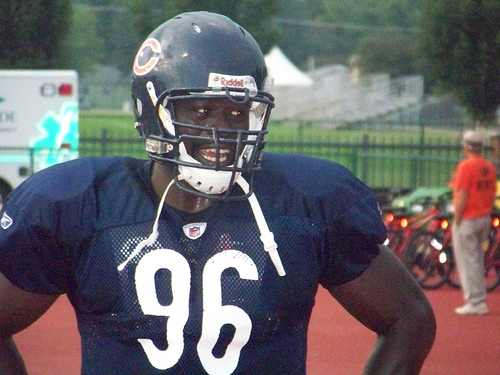
Alex Brown

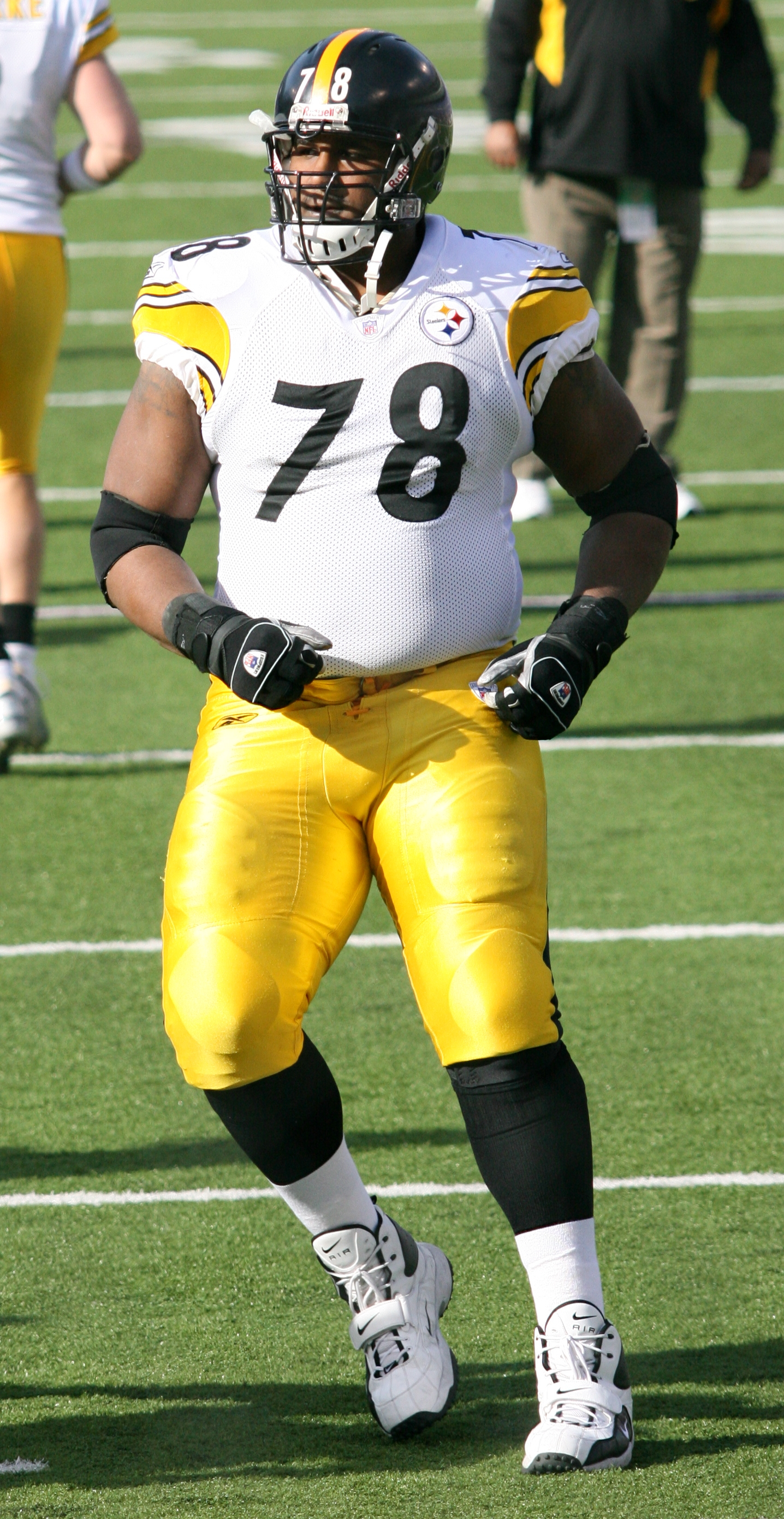
Max Starks

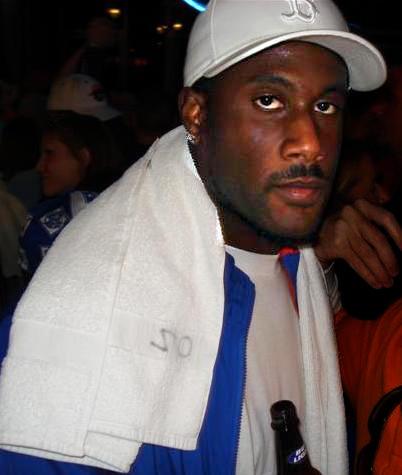
Jarvis Moss

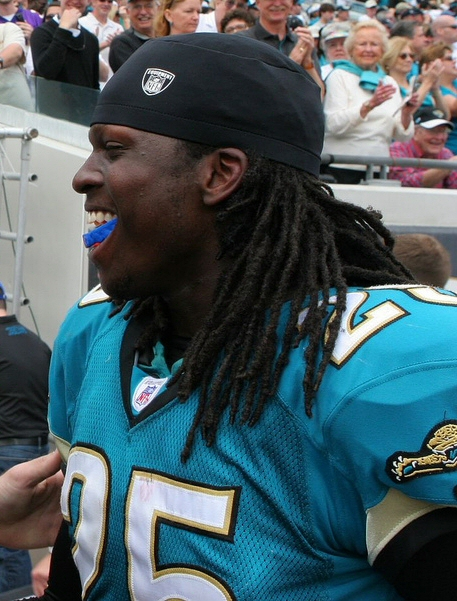
Reggie Nelson

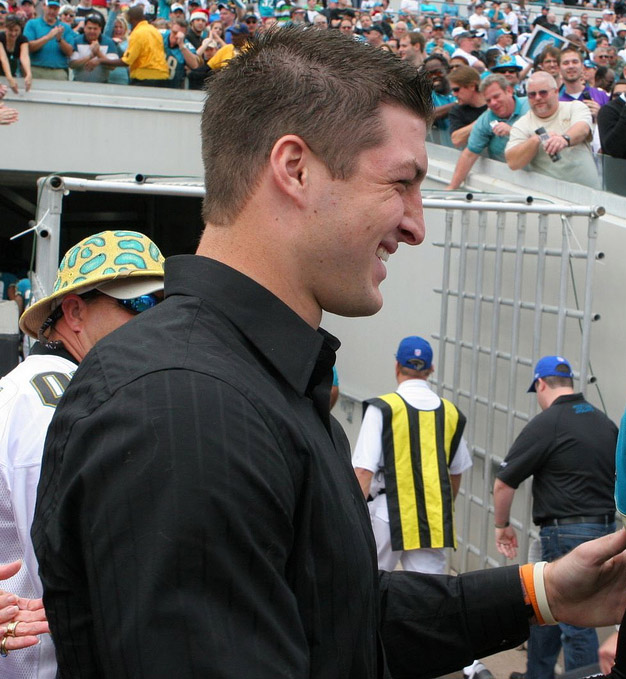
Tim Tebow

=== American Football League ===
Year	Round	Pick	Overall	Player	Team	Position	Ref
1960	1	–	–	Dave Hudson	Denver Broncos	E	
1960	2	–	–	Jim Beaver	Dallas Texans	T	
1960	2	–	–	Bobby Joe Green	Denver Broncos	B	
1960	2	–	–	Perry McGriff	Los Angeles Chargers	E	
1960	2	–	–	Bob Wehking	Los Angeles Chargers	C	
1960	2	–	–	Don Edington	Oakland Raiders	E	
1961	5	1	41	Pat Patchen	Denver Broncos	E	
1961	19	7	159	Jack Espenship	San Diego Chargers	B	
1962	8	4	60	Paul White	Buffalo Bills	B	
1962	15	1	113	Floyd Dean	Oakland Raiders	G	
1962	29	4	228	Jim Beaver	Buffalo Bills	G	
1962	30	3	235	Don Goodman	Dallas Texans	B	
1962	31	5	245	L. E. Hicks	New York Titans	T	
1963	6	5	45	Anton Peters	Denver Broncos	DT	
1963	11	1	81	Lindy Infante	Denver Broncos	B	
1963	14	2	106	Frank Lasky	San Diego Chargers	T	
1963	19	6	150	Bob Hoover	Houston Oilers	B	
1963	19	8	152	Bruce Starling	Kansas City Chiefs	DB	
1963	27	1	209	Dick Skelly	Oakland Raiders	B	
1964	18	5	141	Hagood Clarke	Buffalo Bills	DB	
1965	6	2	42	Dennis Murphy	Houston Oilers	DT	
1965	18	4	140	Larry Dupree	New York Jets	B	
1965	RS4	4	25	Barry Brown	Denver Broncos	E	
1966	3	1	18	Larry Gagner	Miami Dolphins	G	
1966	3	7	25	Randy Jackson	Buffalo Bills	T	

=== National Football League ===
Year	Round	Pick	Overall	Player	Team	Position	Ref
1938	8	1	61	Walter Mayberry	Cleveland Rams	B	
1940	5	3	33	Clark Goff	Pittsburgh Steelers	T	
1941	7	1	51	Julius Battista	Philadelphia Eagles	G	
1942	22	3	198	Milt Hull	New York Giants	T	
1943	10	4	84	Fondren Mitchell	Chicago Cardinals	B	
1943	25	4	234	Gene Lee	Brooklyn Dodgers	C	
1943	29	5	275	Floyd Konetsky	Cleveland Rams	G	
1943	31	5	295	Bill Corry	Washington Redskins	B	
1945	1	2	2	Paul Duhart	Pittsburgh Steelers	B	
1945	4	2	29	Roger Adams	Pittsburgh Steelers	C	
1945	5	11	43	Joe Graham	Green Bay Packers	E	
1945	20	8	205	Broughton Williams	Chicago Bears	B	
1946	24	3	223	Roger Adams	Pittsburgh Steelers	C	
1946	25	10	240	Kay Jamison	Los Angeles Rams	E	
1946	30	2	282	Nick Klutka	Boston Yanks	E	
1948	10	4	79	Bob Forbes	Boston Yanks	B	
1948	27	10	255	Doug Belden	Chicago Cardinals	B	
1950	1	3	3	Chuck Hunsinger	Chicago Bears	B	
1950	13	9	166	Frank Dempsey	Chicago Bears	T	
1950	14	8	178	Jim Kynes	Pittsburgh Steelers	C	
1950	26	8	334	Nick Vaccaro	Pittsburgh Steelers	B	
1952	13	9	154	Carroll McDonald	Detroit Lions	C	
1952	25	3	292	Charlie LaPradd	Green Bay Packers	T	
1952	25	11	300	Billy Reddell	Cleveland Browns	B	
1953	4	7	44	Dewayne Douglas	New York Giants	T	
1953	5	9	58	Buford Long	New York Giants	B	
1953	14	9	166	J. L. Hall	New York Giants	B	
1953	17	4	197	Reed Quinn	Pittsburgh Steelers	B	
1953	22	7	260	Mike Kelley	New York Giants	E	
1953	25	3	292	Haywood Sullivan	Chicago Cardinals	B	
1954	2	5	18	Rick Casares	Chicago Bears	B	
1954	7	6	79	Jack O'Brien	Pittsburgh Steelers	E	
1954	8	8	93	Dan Hunter	Philadelphia Eagles	T	
1954	15	4	173	Joe D'Agostino	Baltimore Colts	G	
1954	17	11	204	Howard Chapman	Cleveland Browns	T	
1955	3	1	26	Mal Hammack	Chicago Cardinals	B	
1955	23	6	271	George Medved	Los Angeles Rams	T	
1955	28	2	327	Arch Cassidy	Washington Redskins	T	
1955	29	11	348	Bill Dearing	Detroit Lions	B	
1956	5	8	57	Don Chandler	New York Giants	B	
1956	6	8	69	Fred Cason	New York Giants	B	
1956	16	10	191	Ray Brown	Chicago Bears	B	
1956	25	8	297	Harry Speers	New York Giants	B	
1956	28	7	332	Bobby Lance	Green Bay Packers	QB	
1957	4	7	44	Jackie Simpson	Baltimore Colts	B	
1957	5	10	59	John Barrow	Detroit Lions	G	
1957	5	12	61	Larry Wesley	New York Giants	T	
1957	8	12	97	William Booker	New York Giants	B	
1957	16	8	189	Joe Brodsky	Washington Redskins	B	
1957	18	12	217	Jim Eaton	New York Giants	E	
1957	23	3	268	John Symank	Green Bay Packers	B	
1957	24	12	289	Don Hicks	New York Giants	T	
1958	2	12	25	Charley Mitchell	Cleveland Browns	G	
1958	9	11	108	Bernie Parrish	Cleveland Browns	B	
1958	10	10	119	Vel Heckman	San Francisco 49ers	T	
1958	15	6	175	Ed Sears	Pittsburgh Steelers	B	
1958	20	5	234	Lu Pelham	Washington Redskins	E	
1958	25	9	298	Jim Rountree	Baltimore Colts	B	
1959	9	6	102	Bobby Joe Green	San Francisco 49ers	B	
1959	16	1	181	Dan Edgington	Green Bay Packers	E	
1959	24	1	277	Joe Hergert	Green Bay Packers	C	
1959	28	3	327	Don Fleming	Chicago Cardinals	DB	
1959	29	12	348	Perry McGriff	Baltimore Colts	E	
1960	6	4	64	Dave Hudson	Washington Redskins	E	
1960	11	10	130	Bob Wehking	Baltimore Colts	C	
1960	17	10	202	Jim Beaver	Baltimore Colts	T	
1961	8	14	112	Jim Beaver	Philadelphia Eagles	G	
1961	11	14	154	L. E. Hicks	Philadelphia Eagles	T	
1961	13	2	170	Don Goodman	Dallas Cowboys	B	
1962	4	8	50	Floyd Dean	San Francisco 49ers	T	
1962	8	3	101	Paul White	Minnesota Vikings	RB	
1963	2	12	26	Frank Lasky	New York Giants	T	
1963	3	13	41	Dick Skelly	New York Giants	B	
1963	8	1	99	Anton Peters	Los Angeles Rams	T	
1963	9	3	115	Bob Hoover	Minnesota Vikings	B	
1963	12	9	163	Lindy Infante	Cleveland Browns	DB	
1964	6	4	74	Russ Brown	Washington Redskins	WR	
1964	7	1	85	Hagood Clarke	San Francisco 49ers	RB	
1964	15	10	206	Barry Brown	Pittsburgh Steelers	WR	
1965	5	5	61	Roger Pettee	Dallas Cowboys	LB	
1965	10	3	129	Dennis Murphy	Chicago Bears	T	
1965	10	11	137	Frank Pennie	Detroit Lions	T	
1965	15	13	209	Larry Gagner	Cleveland Browns	G	
1965	19	14	266	Barry Brown	Baltimore Colts	WR	
1966	2	3	19	Larry Gagner	Pittsburgh Steelers	G	
1966	4	3	51	Randy Jackson	Chicago Bears	T	
1966	6	1	81	Charley Casey	Atlanta Falcons	WR	
1966	15	6	221	Hal Seymour	Washington Redskins	RB	
1967	1	3	3	Steve Spurrier	San Francisco 49ers	QB	
1967	3	4	57	Jim Jordan	Atlanta Falcons	RB	
1967	4	26	106	Bill Carr	New Orleans Saints	C	
1967	11	1	264	Jim Benson	New Orleans Saints	G	
1968	3	8	63	Richard Trapp	Buffalo Bills	WR	
1969	1	8	8	Larry Smith	Los Angeles Rams	RB	
1969	2	21	47	Jim Yarbrough	Detroit Lions	TE	
1969	5	5	109	Guy Dennis	Cincinnati Bengals	G	
1969	17	18	434	Larry Rentz	San Diego Chargers	DB	
1970	1	20	20	Steve Tannen	New York Jets	DB	
1970	10	16	250	Mac Steen	San Diego Chargers	G	
1971	1	20	20	Jack Youngblood	Los Angeles Rams	DE	
1972	1	14	14	John Reaves	Philadelphia Eagles	QB	
1972	12	8	294	Mike Rich	Green Bay Packers	RB	
1972	14	10	348	Tommy Durrance	Pittsburgh Steelers	RB	
1972	15	26	390	Carlos Alvarez	Dallas Cowboys	WR	
1973	6	13	143	Fred Abbott	Minnesota Vikings	LB	
1973	11	25	285	Willie Jackson	Los Angeles Rams	WR	
1974	3	26	78	Nat Moore	Miami Dolphins	WR	
1974	4	18	96	Vince Kendrick	Atlanta Falcons	RB	
1974	5	9	113	Joel Parker	New Orleans Saints	WR	
1974	12	1	287	Ricky Browne	Houston Oilers	LB	
1974	12	26	312	Jim Revels	Miami Dolphins	DB	
1975	1	14	14	Glenn Cameron	Cincinnati Bengals	LB	
1975	2	3	29	Ralph Ortega	Atlanta Falcons	LB	
1975	2	18	44	Burton Lawless	Dallas Cowboys	G	
1975	8	9	191	Preston Kendrick	San Francisco 49ers	LB	
1976	2	1	29	Sammy Green	Seattle Seahawks	LB	
1976	2	2	30	Jimmy DuBose	Tampa Bay Buccaneers	RB	
1976	4	19	111	Mike Smith	Philadelphia Eagles	DE	
1976	6	1	157	Al Darby	Seattle Seahawks	TE	
1976	7	17	199	James Richards	New York Jets	RB	
1976	12	13	332	Gerard Loper	San Francisco 49ers	G	
1976	13	9	356	Mike Williams	Atlanta Falcons	T	
1976	14	28	403	Wayne Field	Pittsburgh Steelers	DB	
1977	9	16	239	David Posey	San Francisco 49ers	K	
1977	10	1	252	Robert Morgan	Tampa Bay Buccaneers	RB	
1977	10	2	253	Alvin Cowans	Pittsburgh Steelers	DB	
1977	12	3	310	Jimmy Stephens	Pittsburgh Steelers	TE	
1978	1	3	3	Wes Chandler	New Orleans Saints	WR	
1978	2	10	38	Scott Hutchinson	Buffalo Bills	DE	
1978	4	7	91	Terry LeCount	San Francisco 49ers	WR	
1978	5	14	124	Earl Carr	St. Louis Cardinals	RB	
1978	5	18	128	Willie Wilder	Green Bay Packers	RB	
1978	6	21	159	Tony Green	Washington Redskins	RB	
1978	8	3	197	Derrick Gaffney	New York Jets	WR	
1978	10	9	259	Mark Totten	Green Bay Packers	C	
1978	11	18	296	Charlie Williams	New England Patriots	LB	
1978	12	5	311	Alan Williams	New York Jets	P	
1979	7	13	178	Don Swafford	Philadelphia Eagles	T	
1979	10	3	251	Mike DuPree	Kansas City Chiefs	LB	
1980	3	20	76	Scot Brantley	Tampa Bay Buccaneers	LB	
1981	2	9	37	Cris Collinsworth	Cincinnati Bengals	WR	
1981	6	15	153	Dock Luckie	Kansas City Chiefs	DT	
1981	7	17	183	David Little	Pittsburgh Steelers	LB	
1981	7	24	190	Mike Clark	Los Angeles Rams	DE	
1982	2	11	83	David Galloway	St. Louis Cardinals	DT	
1982	10	2	253	Brian Clark	New England Patriots	K	
1982	10	20	271	Robin Fisher	Miami Dolphins	LB	
1983	1	13	13	James Jones	Detroit Lions	RB	
1983	4	24	108	Chris Faulkner	Dallas Cowboys	TE	
1983	9	5	229	Mike Mularkey	San Francisco 49ers	TE	
1983	10	23	274	Danny Fike	New York Jets	T	
1984	1	11	11	Wilber Marshall	Chicago Bears	LB	
1984	3	22	78	Tony Lilly	Denver Broncos	DB	
1984	8	6	202	Randy Clark	Kansas City Chiefs	DB	
1984	9	8	232	John Hunt	Dallas Cowboys	G	
1985	1	6	6	Lomas Brown	Detroit Lions	T	
1985	1	27	27	Lorenzo Hampton	Miami Dolphins	RB	
1985	3	20	76	Crawford Ker	Dallas Cowboys	G	
1985	5	27	139	Billy Hinson	Denver Broncos	G	
1985	6	24	164	Tim Newton	Minnesota Vikings	DT	
1985	11	26	306	Gary Rolle	Denver Broncos	WR	
1986	1	15	15	John L. Williams	Seattle Seahawks	RB	
1986	1	27	27	Neal Anderson	Chicago Bears	RB	
1986	2	21	48	Alonzo Johnson	Philadelphia Eagles	LB	
1986	5	11	121	Ray Criswell	Philadelphia Eagles	P	
1986	5	21	131	Patrick Miller	San Francisco 49ers	LB	
1986	7	21	187	Ray McDonald	New England Patriots	WR	
1986	8	17	211	Alonzo Mitz	Seattle Seahawks	DE	
1987	1	27	27	Ricky Nattiel	Denver Broncos	WR	
1987	2	27	55	Adrian White	New York Giants	DB	
1987	3	12	68	Jeff Zimmerman	Dallas Cowboys	G	
1987	6	9	149	Ron Moten	Philadelphia Eagles	LB	
1987	12	11	318	Scott Armstrong	Dallas Cowboys	LB	
1987	12	16	323	Keith Williams	Minnesota Vikings	DT	
1988	1	21	21	Clifford Charlton	Cleveland Browns	LB	
1988	2	15	42	Jarvis Williams	Miami Dolphins	DB	
1988	6	25	162	Bob Sims	New Orleans Saints	G	
1988	7	15	180	Kerwin Bell	Miami Dolphins	QB	
1989	1	12	12	Trace Armstrong	Chicago Bears	DE	
1989	1	23	23	David Williams	Houston Oilers	T	
1989	1	25	25	Louis Oliver	Miami Dolphins	RB	
1989	3	12	68	Rhondy Weston	Dallas Cowboys	DE	
1989	5	13	125	Jeff Roth	Dallas Cowboys	DT	
1989	9	18	214	Wayne Williams	Denver Broncos	RB	
1989	12	14	321	Willie Snead	New York Jets	WR	
1990	1	17	17	Emmitt Smith	Dallas Cowboys	RB	
1990	4	2	83	Stacey Simmons	Indianapolis Colts	WR	
1990	5	22	131	Cedric Smith	Minnesota Vikings	RB	
1990	9	25	245	Tony Lomack	Los Angeles Rams	WR	
1991	1	15	15	Huey Richardson	Pittsburgh Steelers	LB	
1991	3	7	62	Godfrey Myles	Dallas Cowboys	LB	
1991	3	18	73	Ernie Mills	Pittsburgh Steelers	WR	
1991	6	18	157	Richard Fain	Cincinnati Bengals	DB	
1991	8	20	215	Jimmy Spencer	Washington Redskins	DB	
1992	4	21	105	Tony McCoy	Indianapolis Colts	DT	
1992	5	7	119	Dexter McNabb	Tampa Bay Buccaneers	RB	
1992	5	15	127	Cal Dixon	New York Jets	C	
1992	6	16	156	Tony Rowell	Los Angeles Raiders	C	
1992	7	14	182	Tim Paulk	Atlanta Falcons	LB	
1992	8	10	206	Hesham Ismail	Pittsburgh Steelers	G	
1992	9	17	241	Ephesians Bartley	Philadelphia Eagles	LB	
1992	10	12	264	Brad Culpepper	Minnesota Vikings	DT	
1992	12	1	309	Mike Brandon	Indianapolis Colts	DE	
1993	6	2	142	Lawrence Hatch	New England Patriots	DB	
1993	7	4	172	Will White	Phoenix Cardinals	DB	
1994	2	5	34	Errict Rhett	Tampa Bay Buccaneers	RB	
1994	4	6	109	Willie Jackson	Dallas Cowboys	WR	
1994	5	7	138	Harrison Houston	Atlanta Falcons	WR	
1994	5	16	147	William Gaines	Miami Dolphins	DT	
1995	1	6	6	Kevin Carter	St. Louis Rams	DE	
1995	1	15	15	Ellis Johnson	Indianapolis Colts	DT	
1995	4	2	100	Chris Cowart	San Diego Chargers	LB	
1995	4	18	116	Jack Jackson	Chicago Bears	WR	
1995	6	9	180	Henry McMillian	Seattle Seahawks	DT	
1996	3	17	78	Mark Campbell	Denver Broncos	DT	
1996	4	1	96	Jason Odom	Tampa Bay Buccaneers	T	
1996	6	5	172	Dexter Daniels	Baltimore Ravens	LB	
1996	6	17	184	Reggie Green	Seattle Seahawks	G	
1996	6	18	185	Chris Doering	Jacksonville Jaguars	WR	
1996	7	16	225	Johnnie Church	Seattle Seahawks	DE	
1997	1	7	7	Ike Hilliard	New York Giants	WR	
1997	1	16	16	Reidel Anthony	Tampa Bay Buccaneers	WR	
1997	4	3	99	Danny Wuerffel	New Orleans Saints	QB	
1997	5	4	134	Jeff Mitchell	Baltimore Ravens	C	
1998	1	9	9	Fred Taylor	Jacksonville Jaguars	RB	
1998	1	23	23	Mo Collins	Oakland Raiders	T	
1998	2	4	34	Jacquez Green	Tampa Bay Buccaneers	WR	
1998	4	5	97	Fred Weary	New Orleans Saints	DB	
1998	6	13	166	Elijah Williams	Atlanta Falcons	DB	
1999	1	16	16	Jevon Kearse	Tennessee Titans	LB	
1999	1	24	24	Reggie McGrew	San Francisco 49ers	DT	
1999	2	5	36	Mike Peterson	Indianapolis Colts	LB	
1999	2	20	51	Johnny Rutledge	Arizona Cardinals	LB	
1999	3	20	81	Zach Piller	Tennessee Titans	G	
1999	3	30	91	Tony George	New England Patriots	DB	
1999	3	32	93	Travis McGriff	Denver Broncos	WR	
1999	5	24	157	Terry Jackson	San Francisco 49ers	RB	
2000	1	10	10	Travis Taylor	Baltimore Ravens	WR	
2000	3	6	68	Erron Kinney	Tennessee Titans	TE	
2000	3	18	80	Darrell Jackson	Seattle Seahawks	WR	
2000	4	18	112	Cooper Carlisle	Denver Broncos	T	
2000	7	43	249	Eugene McCaslin	Green Bay Packers	LB	
2001	1	3	3	Gerard Warren	Cleveland Browns	DT	
2001	1	14	14	Kenyatta Walker	Tampa Bay Buccaneers	T	
2001	4	30	125	Jesse Palmer	New York Giants	QB	
2001	7	8	208	John Capel	Chicago Bears	WR	
2002	1	26	26	Lito Sheppard	Philadelphia Eagles	DB	
2002	2	1	33	Jabar Gaffney	Houston Texans	WR	
2002	2	8	40	Mike Pearson	Jacksonville Jaguars	T	
2002	2	16	48	Reche Caldwell	San Diego Chargers	WR	
2002	4	4	102	Jeff Chandler	San Francisco 49ers	K	
2002	4	6	104	Alex Brown	Chicago Bears	DE	
2002	5	6	141	Andra Davis	Cleveland Browns	LB	
2002	6	9	181	Marquand Manuel	Cincinnati Bengals	DB	
2003	1	22	22	Rex Grossman	Chicago Bears	QB	
2003	2	12	44	Taylor Jacobs	Washington Redskins	WR	
2003	4	3	100	Todd Johnson	Chicago Bears	DB	
2003	4	19	116	Ian Scott	Chicago Bears	DT	
2003	5	26	161	Aaron Walker	San Francisco 49ers	TE	
2003	5	36	171	Tron LaFavor	Chicago Bears	DT	
2003	6	17	190	Michael Nattiel	Minnesota Vikings	LB	
2003	7	13	227	Clint Mitchell	Denver Broncos	DE	
2004	2	8	40	Ben Troupe	Tennessee Titans	TE	
2004	2	17	49	Keiwan Ratliff	Cincinnati Bengals	DB	
2004	3	12	75	Max Starks	Pittsburgh Steelers	T	
2004	3	32	95	Guss Scott	New England Patriots	DB	
2004	7	48	249	Bobby McCray	Jacksonville Jaguars	DE	
2005	3	6	70	Channing Crowder	Miami Dolphins	LB	
2005	4	11	112	Ciatrick Fason	Minnesota Vikings	RB	
2005	7	4	218	Reynaldo Hill	Tennessee Titans	DB	
2006	2	4	36	Chad Jackson	New England Patriots	WR	
2006	6	22	191	Jeremy Mincey	New England Patriots	DE	
2006	7	28	236	Demetrice Webb	Jacksonville Jaguars	DB	
2007	1	17	17	Jarvis Moss	Denver Broncos	DE	
2007	1	21	21	Reggie Nelson	Jacksonville Jaguars	DB	
2007	3	34	97	Ray McDonald	San Francisco 49ers	DT	
2007	4	22	121	Marcus Thomas	Denver Broncos	DT	
2007	4	36	135	Joe Cohen	San Francisco 49ers	DT	
2007	6	32	206	Ryan Smith	Tennessee Titans	DB	
2007	7	17	227	Dallas Baker	Pittsburgh Steelers	WR	
2007	7	18	228	DeShawn Wynn	Green Bay Packers	RB	
2007	7	30	240	Brandon Siler	San Diego Chargers	LB	
2008	1	8	8	Derrick Harvey	Jacksonville Jaguars	DE	
2008	3	34	97	Andre Caldwell	Cincinnati Bengals	WR	
2009	1	22	22	Percy Harvin	Minnesota Vikings	WR	
2009	4	24	124	Louis Murphy	Oakland Raiders	WR	
2009	5	17	153	Cornelius Ingram	Philadelphia Eagles	TE	
2010	1	7	7	Joe Haden	Cleveland Browns	DB	
2010	1	18	18	Maurkice Pouncey	Pittsburgh Steelers	C	
2010	1	25	25	Tim Tebow	Denver Broncos	QB	
2010	2	21	53	Jermaine Cunningham	New England Patriots	LB	
2010	2	22	54	Carlos Dunlap	Cincinnati Bengals	DE	
2010	2	30	62	Brandon Spikes	New England Patriots	LB	
2010	3	11	75	Major Wright	Chicago Bears	DB	
2010	4	15	113	Aaron Hernandez	New England Patriots	TE	
2010	5	28	159	Riley Cooper	Philadelphia Eagles	WR	
2011	1	15	15	Mike Pouncey	Miami Dolphins	C	
2011	2	31	63	Marcus Gilbert	Pittsburgh Steelers	T	
2011	5	20	151	Ahmad Black	Tampa Bay Buccaneers	DB	
2011	7	14	217	Maurice Hurt	Washington Redskins	G	
2012	4	19	114	Jaye Howard	Seattle Seahawks	DT	
2012	5	24	159	Chris Rainey	Pittsburgh Steelers	RB	
2013	1	23	23	Sharrif Floyd	Minnesota Vikings	DT	
2013	1	32	32	Matt Elam	Baltimore Ravens	DB	
2013	2	18	50	Jon Bostic	Chicago Bears	LB	
2013	3	23	85	Jordan Reed	Washington Redskins	TE	
2013	4	7	104	Jelani Jenkins	Miami Dolphins	LB	
2013	5	31	164	Mike Gillislee	Miami Dolphins	RB	
2013	5	33	166	Caleb Sturgis	Miami Dolphins	K	
2013	6	1	169	Josh Evans	Jacksonville Jaguars	DB	
2014	1	29	29	Dominique Easley	New England Patriots	DT	
2014	4	1	101	Jaylen Watkins	Philadelphia Eagles	DB	
2014	5	29	169	Ronald Powell	New Orleans Saints	LB	
2014	6	3	179	Jon Halapio	New England Patriots	G	
2015	1	3	3	Dante Fowler	Jacksonville Jaguars	LB	
2015	1	24	24	D. J. Humphries	Arizona Cardinals	T	
2015	3	27	91	Chaz Green	Dallas Cowboys	T	
2015	3	31	95	Matt Jones	Washington Redskins	RB	
2015	4	34	133	Max Garcia	Denver Broncos	C	
2015	5	25	161	Neiron Ball	Oakland Raiders	LB	
2015	7	4	221	Andre Debose	Oakland Raiders	WR	
2015	7	27	244	Trent Brown	San Francisco 49ers	G	
2016	1	11	11	Vernon Hargreaves	Tampa Bay Buccaneers	DB	
2016	1	17	17	Keanu Neal	Atlanta Falcons	DB	
2016	3	9	72	Jonathan Bullard	Chicago Bears	DT	
2016	4	27	125	Antonio Morrison	Indianapolis Colts	LB	
2016	4	28	126	Demarcus Robinson	Kansas City Chiefs	WR	
2016	6	36	211	Kelvin Taylor	San Francisco 49ers	RB	
2016	7	19	240	Alex McCalister	Philadelphia Eagles	DE	
2017	1	21	21	Jarrad Davis	Detroit Lions	LB	
2017	2	7	39	Marcus Maye	New York Jets	DB	
2017	2	14	46	Quincy Wilson	Indianapolis Colts	DB	
2017	2	21	53	Teez Tabor	Detroit Lions	DB	
2017	3	12	76	Alex Anzalone	New Orleans Saints	LB	
2017	4	23	129	David Sharpe	Oakland Raiders	T	
2017	6	1	185	Caleb Brantley	Cleveland Browns	DT	
2017	7	10	228	Joey Ivie	Dallas Cowboys	DT	
2018	1	29	29	Taven Bryan	Jacksonville Jaguars	DT	
2018	2	24	56	Duke Dawson	New England Patriots	DB	
2018	4	5	105	Antonio Callaway	Cleveland Browns	WR	
2018	5	36	173	Johnny Townsend	Oakland Raiders	P	
2018	6	10	185	Marcell Harris	San Francisco 49ers	DB	
2019	2	3	35	Jawaan Taylor	Jacksonville Jaguars	T	
2019	3	4	68	Jachai Polite	New York Jets	LB	
2019	4	3	105	C. J. Gardner-Johnson	New Orleans Saints	DB	
2019	5	9	147	Vosean Joseph	Buffalo Bills	LB	
2019	5	15	154	Jordan Scarlett	Carolina Panthers	RB	
2020	1	9	9	C. J. Henderson	Jacksonville Jaguars	DB	
2020	2	25	57	Van Jefferson	Los Angeles Rams	WR	
2020	3	15	79	Jabari Zuniga	New York Jets	DE	
2020	3	26	90	Jonathan Greenard	Houston Texans	LB	
2020	4	14	120	La'Mical Perine	New York Jets	RB	
2020	6	35	214	Freddie Swain	Seattle Seahawks	WR	
2020	7	38	252	Tyrie Cleveland	Denver Broncos	WR	
2021	1	4	4	Kyle Pitts	Atlanta Falcons	TE	
2021	1	20	20	Kadarius Toney	New York Giants	WR	
2021	2	32	64	Kyle Trask	Tampa Bay Buccaneers	QB	
2021	4	31	136	Marco Wilson	Arizona Cardinals	DB	
2021	5	5	149	Evan McPherson	Cincinnati Bengals	K	
2021	5	21	165	Shawn Davis	Indianapolis Colts	DB	
2021	5	29	173	Tedarrell Slaton	Green Bay Packers	DT	
2021	6	24	208	Stone Forsythe	Seattle Seahawks	T	
2022	1	23	23	Kaiir Elam	Buffalo Bills	DB	
2022	3	31	95	Zachary Carter	Cincinnati Bengals	DT	
2022	4	2	107	Dameon Pierce	Houston Texans	RB	
2023	1	4	4	Anthony Richardson	Indianapolis Colts	QB	
2023	2	22	53	Gervon Dexter	Chicago Bears	DT	
2023	2	28	59	O'Cyrus Torrence	Buffalo Bills	G	
2023	4	19	121	Ventrell Miller	Jacksonville Jaguars	LB	
2023	5	15	150	Justin Shorter	Buffalo Bills	WR	
2023	6	26	203	Amari Burney	Las Vegas Raiders	LB	
2024	1	31	31	Ricky Pearsall	San Francisco 49ers	WR	
2025	4	1	103	Chimere Dike	Tennessee Titans	WR	
2025	5	2	140	Cam Jackson	Carolina Panthers	DT	
2025	5	13	150	Jason Marshall Jr.	Miami Dolphins	DB	
2025	5	16	152	Shemar James	Dallas Cowboys	LB	
2025	6	21	197	Graham Mertz	Houston Texans	QB	
2025	6	40	216	Jeremy Crawshaw	Tampa Bay Buccaneers	P	
2025	7	40	256	Trikweze Bridges	Los Angeles Chargers	DB	
2026	1	18	18	Caleb Banks	Minnesota Vikings	DE	
2026	2	31	63	Jake Slaughter	Los Angeles Chargers	C	
2026	3	22	86	Austin Barber	Cleveland Browns	T	
2026	4	14	114	Devin Moore	Dallas Cowboys	DB	
2026	5	16	156	George Gumbs Jr.	Indianapolis Colts	DE	
2026	6	35	216	Trey Smack	Green Bay Packers	K	
2026	7	23	239	Tommy Doman	Buffalo Bills	P	

== Notable undrafted players ==
Year	Player	Team	Position	Ref
1967	Jack Harper	Miami Dolphins	RB	
1967	Kay Stephenson	San Diego Chargers	QB	
1968	Harmon Wages	Atlanta Falcons	RB	
1972	John James	Atlanta Falcons	P	
1976	Lee McGriff	Tampa Bay Buccaneers	WR	
1977	Larry Brinson	Dallas Cowboys	RB	
1978	Lewis Gilbert	Atlanta Falcons	TE	
1979	James Harrell	Detroit Lions	LB	
1982	Tim Golden	New England Patriots	LB	
1983	Tyrone Young	New Orleans Saints	WR	
1984	Dwayne Dixon	Tampa Bay Buccaneers	WR	
1993	Shane Matthews	Chicago Bears	QB	
1993	Del Speer	Cleveland Browns	DB	
1994	Monty Grow	Kansas City Chiefs	DB	
1995	Shayne Edge	Tampa Bay Buccaneers	P	
1996	Ben Hanks	Minnesota Vikings	LB	
1997	Lawrence Wright	Cincinnati Bengals	DB	
2000	Doug Johnson	Atlanta Falcons	QB	
2001	Buck Gurley	Tampa Bay Buccaneers	DT	
2003	Earnest Graham	Tampa Bay Buccaneers	RB	
2004	Ran Carthon	Indianapolis Colts	RB	
2004	Kelvin Kight	St. Louis Rams	WR	
2007	Steven Harris	Denver Broncos	DT	
2007	Chris Leak	Chicago Bears	QB	
2008	Drew Miller	Jacksonville Jaguars	C	
2009	Phil Trautwein	St. Louis Rams	OT	
2010	David Nelson	Buffalo Bills	WR	
2010	Brandon James	Indianapolis Colts	WR	
2011	Chas Henry	Philadelphia Eagles	P	
2011	Will Hill	New York Giants	S	
2011	Justin Trattou	New York Giants	DE	
2012	Deonte Thompson	Philadelphia Eagles	WR	
2013	Frankie Hammond	Kansas City Chiefs	WR	
2013	Lerentee McCray	Denver Broncos	LB	
2014	Trey Burton	Philadelphia Eagles	TE	
2014	Jonotthan Harrison	Indianapolis Colts	C	
2014	Solomon Patton	Tampa Bay Buccaneers	WR	
2014	Marcus Roberson	St. Louis Rams	DB	
2015	Drew Ferris	New York Jets	LS	
2016	Jake McGee	Carolina Panthers	TE	
2016	Brian Poole	Atlanta Falcons	CB	
2017	Bryan Cox Jr.	Carolina Panthers	DE	
2018	Eddy Piñeiro	Oakland Raiders	K	
2019	Martez Ivey	New England Patriots	OL	
2019	Fred Johnson	Pittsburgh Steelers	T	
2020	Josh Hammond	Jacksonville Jaguars	WR	
2020	Tommy Townsend	Kansas City Chiefs	P	
2021	Trevon Grimes	Philadelphia Eagles	WR	
2022	Malik Davis	Dallas Cowboys	RB	
2022	Jeremiah Moon	Baltimore Ravens	LB	
2023	Brenton Cox Jr.	Green Bay Packers	DE	
2023	Trey Dean	New York Jets	S	
2023	Richard Gouraige	Buffalo Bills	OT	
2024	Kingsley Eguakun	Detroit Lions	C	
2025	Elijhah Badger	Kansas City Chiefs	WR	
2025	Desmond Watson	Tampa Bay Buccaneers	DT	
2026	Tyreak Sapp	Cleveland Browns	DE	
2026	J. Michael Sturdivant	Green Bay Packers	WR	

== See also ==
- Florida Gators football statistical leaders
- List of Florida Gators football All-Americans
- List of University of Florida Athletic Hall of Fame members
- List of Florida Gators head football coaches
