= 2007 Florida Gators football team =

American college football season

2007 Florida Gators football

Capital One Bowl, L 35–41 vs. Michigan
- Conference: Southeastern Conference
- Eastern Division

Ranking
- Coaches: No. 16
- AP: No. 13
- Record: 9–4 (5–3 SEC)
- Head coach: Urban Meyer (3rd season)
- Offensive coordinator: Dan Mullen (3rd season)
- Offensive scheme: Spread
- Co-defensive coordinators: Greg Mattison (3rd season); Charlie Strong (5th season)
- Base defense: 4–3
- Captains: Andre Caldwell; Derrick Harvey; Tony Joiner; Drew Miller; Phil Trautwein
- Home stadium: Ben Hill Griffin Stadium

2007 Southeastern Conference football standings
	Conf.			Overall
Team	W		L	W		L
Eastern Division
No. 12 Tennessee xy	6	–	2	10	–	4
No. 2 Georgia x%	6	–	2	11	–	2
No. 13 Florida	5	–	3	9	–	4
South Carolina	3	–	5	6	–	6
Kentucky	3	–	5	8	–	5
Vanderbilt	2	–	6	5	–	7
Western Division
No. 1 LSU x$#	6	–	2	12	–	2
No. 15 Auburn	5	–	3	9	–	4
Arkansas	4	–	4	8	–	5
Mississippi State	4	–	4	8	–	5
Alabama	4	–	4	7	–	6
Ole Miss	0	–	8	3	–	9
Championship: LSU 21, Tennessee 14
# – BCS National Champion; $ – BCS representative as conference champion; % – BCS at-large representative; x – Division champion/co-champions; y – Championship game participant; Alabama had 5 victories vacated by the NCAA in 2010. As such, the official record for Alabama is 2–6 (1–4).; Rankings from AP Poll

The 2007 Florida Gators football team represented the University of Florida as a member of the Eastern Division in the Southeastern Conference (SEC) during the 2007 NCAA Division I FBS football season. Led by third-year head Urban Meyer, the Gators compiled an overall record of 9–4 with mark of 5–3 in conference play, placing third the SEC's Eastern Division. Florida was invited to the Capital One Bowl, where the Gators lost to Michigan. The team played home games at Ben Hill Griffin Stadium on the university's Gainesville, Florida campus.

Florida's quarterback was Tim Tebow, the first sophomore ever to win the Heisman Trophy.

== Schedule ==
Date	Opponent	Rank	Site	TV	Result	Attendance
September 1	Western Kentucky*	No. 6	Ben Hill Griffin Stadium; Gainesville, FL	LFS	W 49–3	90,086
September 8	Troy*	No. 4	Ben Hill Griffin Stadium; Gainesville, FL	PPV	W 59–31	90,244
September 15	No. 22 Tennessee	No. 3	Ben Hill Griffin Stadium; Gainesville, FL (rivalry)	CBS	W 59–20	90,707
September 22	at Ole Miss	No. 3	Vaught–Hemingway Stadium; Oxford, MS	LFS	W 30–24	55,032
September 29	Auburn	No. 4	Ben Hill Griffin Stadium; Gainesville, FL (rivalry)	ESPN	L 17–20	90,685
October 6	at No. 1 LSU	No. 9	Tiger Stadium; Baton Rouge, LA (rivalry, College GameDay)	CBS	L 24–28	92,910
October 20	at No. 8 Kentucky	No. 14	Commonwealth Stadium; Lexington, KY (rivalry, College GameDay)	CBS	W 45–37	71,024
October 27	vs. No. 20 Georgia	No. 9	Jacksonville Municipal Stadium; Jacksonville, FL (rivalry)	CBS	L 30–42	84,481
November 3	Vanderbilt^{†}	No. 18	Ben Hill Griffin Stadium; Gainesville, FL	LFS	W 49–22	90,222
November 10	at South Carolina	No. 17	Williams–Brice Stadium; Columbia, SC	ESPN	W 51–31	81,215
November 17	Florida Atlantic*	No. 14	Ben Hill Griffin Stadium; Gainesville, FL	PPV	W 59–20	90,107
November 24	Florida State*	No. 12	Ben Hill Griffin Stadium; Gainesville, FL (rivalry)	CBS**	W 45–12	90,664
January 1, 2008	vs. Michigan*	No. 9	Florida Citrus Bowl; Orlando, FL (Capital One Bowl)	ABC	L 35–41	69,748
*Non-conference game; ^{†}Homecoming; Rankings from AP Poll released prior to the game

**The game aired in its entirety on all CBS stations on a regional basis in Florida, due to the Tennessee-Kentucky game going into 4 overtimes. It was joined in progress after the game ended, and updates of this game were aired for the Tennessee-Kentucky audience during the OT. As a result of both games airing at the same time, the majority of the first half effectively aired commercial-free.

== Rankings ==
Ranking movements Legend: ██ Increase in ranking ██ Decrease in ranking ( ) = First-place votes
	Week															
Poll	Pre	1	2	3	4	5	6	7	8	9	10	11	12	13	14	Final
AP	6	4	5	3	4	9	13	14	9	18	17	14	12	10	9	13
Coaches	3	3	3	3	3	7	14	14	11	17	18	14	14	11	12	16
Harris	Not released				4 (3)	8	13	14	9	16	17	14	14	11	11	Not released
BCS	Not released							15	11	20	15	12	12	10	12	Not released

== Before the season ==
The Gators won the BCS Championship Game in Glendale, Arizona to cap off the 2006 season, the second national championship in school history. In addition, they won a school-record 13 games and the school's seventh official SEC title. The coaching staff remained, surprisingly, intact after 2006, which gave Meyer a third straight season at Florida with the same coaching staff. The schedule for the Gators played in their favor this season, as they faced their toughest opponents—such as Tennessee, Auburn, and Florida State—at home in Ben Hill Griffin Stadium. Despite the challenges of youth, the Gators were ranked in the top 5 in some preseason polls.

Two highly rated recruiting classes from 2006 and 2007 filled up most of the depth chart, as few upperclassmen remained from last year's title team. Nine of 11 starters were replaced from their championship defense. While the offense lost fewer starters — only 8 — from the previous season, the Gators had to replace Chris Leak at quarterback. Leak was replaced by sophomore Tim Tebow, who shared quarterback duties with him last season.

=== Pre-season watchlists ===
- Tim Tebow (QB) – 2007 Maxwell Award Watch List
- Tim Tebow (QB) – 2007 Manning Award Watch List
- Andre Caldwell (WR) – 2007 Maxwell Award Watch List
- Percy Harvin (WR) – 2007 Maxwell Award Watch List
- Derrick Harvey (DE) – 2007 Bednarik Award Watch List

== Game summaries ==
=== Western Kentucky ===
Western Kentucky @ Florida

Team	1	2	3	4	Total
WKU	0	3	0	0	3
• Florida	14	14	7	14	49

- Location: Ben Hill Griffin Stadium, Gainesville, Florida

For the season opener, the Western Kentucky Hilltoppers filled the void left by the UCF Knights, who had decided to back out of the game in December 2006. This was the first contest between these two schools. It was also the first game in Ben Hill Griffin Stadium after the Gators won their 2006 SEC and national championships.

Sophomore quarterback Tim Tebow led the Gators to touchdowns on their first four possessions en route to a relatively easy 49–3 victory in intense early season heat. Tebow finished his first career start 13-of-17 for 300 yards and three touchdown passes, and added a rushing touchdown as well. True freshman quarterback Cameron Newton entered the game in the fourth quarter and rushed for a touchdown on the last play before lightning in the area caused an hour-long delay. When the weather failed to clear, the game was declared final with 8:23 remaining in the 4th quarter.

=== Troy ===
Troy @ Florida

Team	1	2	3	4	Total
Troy	7	0	17	7	31
• Florida	21	28	0	10	59

- Location: Ben Hill Griffin Stadium, Gainesville, Florida

In the first half against the Troy Trojans, the Gator offense led by QB Tim Tebow scored a touchdown every time it had the ball. (Note: The Gators' second game of the season was also the first meeting with its opponent. This was the second of three such games in the 2007 season.) The special teams chipped in with two blocked punts, and, after allowing an early touchdown, the young Gator defense shut out their opponents for the rest of the half. The score stood at 49–7 after two quarters, the Gators having racked up over 350 yards of total offense, Tebow throwing 3 touchdown passes and running for another score in an impressive display of all-around dominating football.

After halftime, though, things changed in The Swamp. Florida received the second half kickoff and fumbled a few plays later, leading to a Troy touchdown. That sequence would set the tone for the rest of the game. The Gators seemed to lose their offensive rhythm and the point production dried up while Troy QB Omar Haugabook (30-53, 291 yards, 2 TDs) found his own rhythm, helping the Trojans outscore the Gators 24–10 over the final two quarters.

When the final whistle blew, Florida came away with a 59–31 victory. The outcome was never in doubt; the Gators 2nd half lead was always greater than 20 points. And their final stats looked impressive – they outgained the Trojans 500 to 336 and averaged 7 yards per offensive play. Tebow's numbers were solid as well; he completed 18 of 25 passes for 236 yards and three touchdowns (with no interceptions) and rushed 19 times for a team-high 93 yards and 2 more TDs. In fact, his play earned Tebow honors as the Southeastern Conference offensive player of the week.

However, the second half lapses and miscues (Florida was hit with 11 penalties for 104 yards) made it obvious that the Gators gridders had plenty to work on as they prepared for their SEC opener against the Tennessee Volunteers the following Saturday.

=== Tennessee ===
Tennessee @ Florida

Team	1	2	3	4	Total
Tennessee	3	10	7	0	20
• Florida	14	14	7	24	59

- Date: September 17
- Location: Ben Hill Griffin Stadium, Gainesville, Florida

On the 1st possession of the game in the steamy Swamp, the Tennessee Volunteers went three and out. On the ensuing punt, Brandon James took the return 83 yards for Gator touchdown. Things never did get much better for the visitors, as Florida rolled to an impressive 59–20 victory in the SEC opener for both teams.

There was, however, a brief period when it seemed that the contest would be much closer. The Gators ran out to a 28–6 lead by late in the 2nd quarter on two Tim Tebow touchdown passes and a Tebow touchdown run, along with the opening punt return. But then Tennessee QB Erik Ainge got his team's offense moving, throwing a touchdown pass just before halftime to cut the lead to 28–13 at intermission.

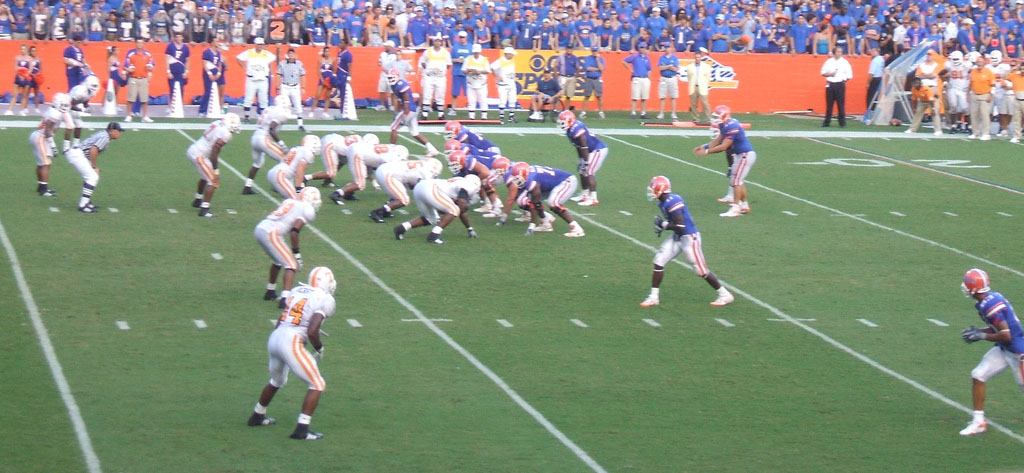
Tim Tebow runs the spread option offense vs the Tennessee Volunteers.

The Gators mounted a long drive to start the second half, but freshman Volunteer cornerback Eric Berry picked off a Tim Tebow pass (his first interception thrown in 2007) and returned it 93 yards for another Tennessee touchdown. When Florida's next drive ended in a punt, UT had the ball down only eight, 28–20.

But on the first play of the possession, Erik Ainge's handoff to running back Arian Foster was mishandled, and Gator linebacker Dustin Doe scooped up the loose ball and took it into the endzone for a Florida touchdown. Tennessee's momentum was washed away by the roar of 90,000 Gator fans, and the home team never looked back. Florida would end the game with 31 straight points, turning a close contest into a runaway.

Several Gators had excellent afternoons. Tim Tebow finished 14-19 passing for 299 yards with 2 TDs and 1 INT and rushed for 62 yards and 2 more TDs, and was awarded as the Walter Camp Foundation national offensive player of the week. Brandon James was the SEC special teams player of the week for his 193 yards and a touchdown on kick returns. And receiver Percy Harvin excelled as well, leading all players in rushing (9 attempts for 75 yards and 1 TD) and receiving (4 catches for 120 yards).

The Florida offense rolled up 556 yards of total offense, 255 on the ground. Meanwhile, the Gator defense also did its part, holding Tennessee to just 38 yards rushing with no first downs on the ground and 293 yards total offense.

Overall, the Gators put together a historically dominating performance. Their 59 points scored was the second-highest total in the history of the series (behind only UF's 62 in the 1995 contest), and the 39 point margin of defeat was the Vols' most lopsided loss to any opponent since 1981. Tennessee still leads the overall series by a narrow 19-18 margin.

=== Ole Miss ===
Florida @ Ole Miss

Team	1	2	3	4	Total
• Florida	0	14	13	3	30
Ole Miss	3	3	18	0	24

- Location: Oxford, Mississippi

Though they looked dominant at times early in the season, the 2007 Florida Gator squad was a team that relied on many freshmen and sophomores in key roles. This inexperience was evident in their contest with the Ole Miss Rebels in Oxford, Mississippi. Thirty-five players on Florida's 60-man traveling roster had never played in a collegiate road game before, and it showed. But as the clock in Vaught–Hemingway Stadium ticked down to 00:00, the Gators had done enough to earn a tighter-than-expected 30–24 victory.

At different points in the game, the young Gators struggled on offense, defense, and special teams. They also committed 14 penalties for 127 yards, with several of the miscues either stalling Gator drives or helping the Rebel's scoring chances.

But once again, it was Tim Tebow who led Florida's charge to victory. The sophomore quarterback completed 20 of 34 passes for 262 yards and 2 touchdowns and no interceptions. Once again, his favorite target was Percy Harvin, who had 11 receptions for 123 yards and a TD. Tebow also rushed 27 times for 168 yards and 2 more touchdowns, setting new Florida single-game records for rushing attempts and rushing yards by a quarterback and almost single-handedly running out the clock late in the game. In all, Tebow accounted for all 4 Gator touchdowns and 427 of his team's 507 total yards. For his efforts, Tebow was named the SEC's offensive player of the week for the 2nd time in the 2007 season.

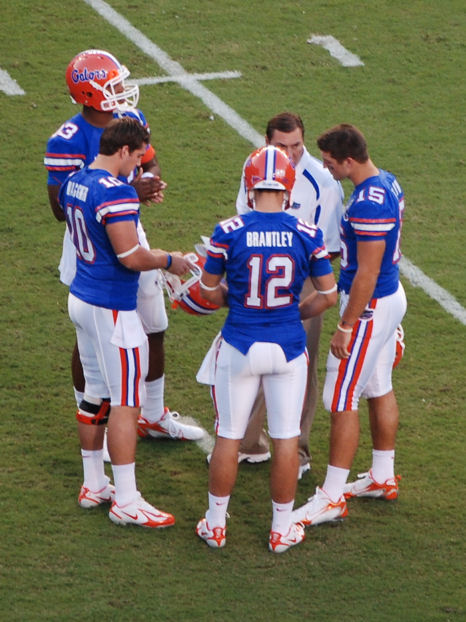
Florida's quarterbacks in pre-game warmups

The Rebels put up a valiant effort. Despite a sore shoulder, Ole Miss quarterback Seth Adams threw for 301 yards and 2 touchdowns, including a perfectly tossed 77-yard scoring strike that cut the Gator advantage to 3 late in the 3rd quarter. Mississippi's lead in the all-time series was reduced to 11-10-1. The Gator victory broke both a two-game losing streak to the Rebels and a three-game losing streak in games played in the state of Mississippi.

=== Auburn ===
Auburn @ Florida

Team	1	2	3	4	Total
• Auburn	7	7	3	3	20
Florida	0	0	3	14	17

- Location: Ben Hill Griffin Stadium, Gainesville, Florida

The Gators were seeking revenge for last seasons's only loss (a 27–17 setback at Auburn) when the Tigers visited The Swamp. The Gator defense proved unreliable in the first half, allowing the Tigers to get two touchdowns, while Auburn exhibited its own top notch defense. While the Gators were able to mount a comeback in the second half, eventually bringing the game to a 17–17 tie, Auburn had the ball at the end of the game, and Auburn kicked a field goal as time expired to make the score 20–17, upsetting the number 4 ranked Gators. This loss was coach Urban Meyer's first in Gainesville, as well as his first loss since last year's loss to Auburn. This was the 82nd meeting between the two teams, with the Tigers bringing their record in the UF-Auburn series to 42–38–2 all-time. Auburn would be the only team Tebow has played, but never defeated. This game was notable for the fact that offensive coordinator and future Florida head coach Dan Mullen underwent an emergency appendectomy the night before, yet still called plays from the press box.

=== LSU ===
Florida @ LSU

Team	1	2	3	4	Total
Florida	3	14	7	0	24
• LSU	0	7	7	14	28

- Location: Tiger Stadium, Baton Rouge, Louisiana

In one of the most anticipated games of the season, the Florida Gators traveled to Tiger Stadium to take on the LSU Tigers in a game that had conference and national title implications.

The Gators took an early lead by kicking a field goal on their first drive. Two drives later, the Gators mounted a 12-play drive that culminated in a Tim Tebow two-yard pass and an unbelievable catch made by Kestahn Moore to put the Gators up by ten. LSU immediately countered with a long drive of their own, going 80 yards in 16 plays, scoring on a Ryan Perrilloux option play to cut the Gator lead to 10–7. The Gators marched down the field again and scored on a Tebow run to put their lead back at 10 with 2:23 to play in the first half. LSU moved the ball right before the half, but kicker Colt David missed a 43-yard field goal.

In the second half, LSU took the ensuing drive but were stopped by the Gator defense. Appearing to kick another long field goal, LSU instead ran a brilliant fake with the holder—quarterback Matt Flynn—who scooted eight yards for the first down. The Tigers scored on a Keiland Williams run shortly thereafter.

The Gators answered the LSU drive with a quick 3-play drive to score on a 37-yard Tebow pass to Cornelius Ingram. Craig Steltz missed an assignment on the play which left Ingram wide open on the post pattern. Florida started the fourth quarter with a 24–14 lead.

However, the Tigers were not to be denied. After missing another relatively short field goal, LSU took advantage of an errant pass by Tim Tebow which hit Ingram in the helmet. The Tigers drove down the field, and Flynn hit Demetrius Byrd for a 3-yard touchdown to cut the Gator lead to 3.

On the final LSU drive, the Tigers converted several fourth down plays, including one by runningback Jacob Hester where he made a great second effort to surge ahead to just get the first down. Hester scored a short touchdown with 1:06 to play in the game, giving the Tigers a 28–24 lead.

On the final drive, Florida gained 30 yards, but Tebow's hail mary pass as time expired was batted down by Chad Jones, sealing the LSU victory. The loss cut Florida's lead in the budding rivalry to 28–23–3.

=== Kentucky ===
Florida @ Kentucky

Team	1	2	3	4	Total
• Florida	14	7	10	14	45
Kentucky	7	3	14	13	37

- Location: Lexington, Kentucky

The Gators traveled to Lexington to take on the Kentucky Wildcats for the 57th time. In a rare reversal, Kentucky was ranked in the top 10 with the Gators on the outside looking in. The Gators still entered the game as 7-point favorites.

Kentucky opened the scoring on an Andre' Woodson 33-yard pass to Dicky Lyons to take an early 7–0 lead. Florida answered on consecutive drives with a 10-yard Tim Tebow pass to Cornelius Ingram and a Tebow to Louis Murphy 66-yard pass to put the Gators up by a touchdown. Kentucky cut the lead to four on a field goal. The Gators countered by mounting a drive before the half that culminated in a Tebow 1-yard "jump pass" to Aaron Hernandez.

The second half began with another Gator score, as Tebow found Andre Caldwell in the end zone on an 8-yard pass. This stretched the Gator lead to 18, their largest of the day. Woodson hit Jacob Tamme on a 28-yard pass to pull the Wildcats within 11. Florida added a field goal to build their lead to 14 midway through the third quarter. Woodson then found Lyons again on a 50-yard catch and run. Again the Gators responded, mounting a 6-minute drive that spanned the third and fourth quarters, culminating in a Percy Harvin 24-yard touchdown run. Both teams traded punts before Woodson found Lyons for the third time on the day on a 6-yard TD pass.

With 3:28 left in the game, Kentucky opted to kick off instead of onside kick. The Gators rolled the dice after getting a first down, as Tebow threw a 40-yard pass to Harvin to get the Gators in the red zone. Tebow closed the drive with a touchdown score on the ground to put the game away.

Kentucky refused to give up, driving to the Florida 5-yard-line with seconds left and closed the game with a touchdown from Woodson to Keenan Burton. With the game already decided, the PAT was not tried and the Gators walked away with a 45–37 victory.

With the win and Tennessee's loss to Alabama, the Gators once again control their destiny in the SEC Eastern Division.

With the victory, Florida leads the series 40-17-0 and has beaten Kentucky twenty one consecutive years in football, the third longest active streak in Division I-FBS. Navy's victory over Notre Dame subsequently snapped the longest streak to make Florida/Kentucky the second longest.

=== Georgia ===
Georgia vs. Florida

Team	1	2	3	4	Total
• Georgia	14	7	7	14	42
Florida	7	10	7	6	30

- Location: Jacksonville, Florida

The 2007 Florida–Georgia football rivalry game saw the emergence of Knowshon Moreno, the Bulldogs' redshirt freshman, with 188 yards on the ground and three touchdowns. Florida's Tim Tebow was limited in the game due to a bruised shoulder and Kestahn Moore suffered from a fumble and missed snap. Moore's fumble early in the game led to Georgia's first touchdown. Suddenly, the entire Bulldog bench rushed onto the field resulting in two separate 15-yard penalties, both assessed on the ensuing kickoff. This excessive celebration was known as the "Gator Stomp", and that play was only the first of three TDs in the game that ended in penalties for excessive celebration, with Georgia's Mohamed Massaquoi and Florida's Wondy Pierre-Louis drawing the other flags. The Gators rallied back with a quick touchdown but were never able to take the lead. A late touchdown by Moreno sealed the victory for the Bulldogs. This was the 85th meeting between the two teams. The Bulldogs hold a 46–37–2 series lead. Florida has won fifteen of the last eighteen contests, but are 2 and 2 in the last 4 games.

=== Vanderbilt ===
Vanderbilt @ Florida

Team	1	2	3	4	Total
Vanderbilt	0	7	3	12	22
• Florida	14	21	7	7	49

- Location: Ben Hill Griffin Stadium, Gainesville, Florida

The Vanderbilt Commodores traveled to Gainesville for the first time since 2005 where they nearly came away with a win in overtime. In the 41st meeting between the two, Florida came out early with a 35–7 lead by the half. The Gators finished with 498 yards on offense against what had been the 14th best defense in the nation. Tim Tebow completed 22 of 27 passes for 281 yards passing and also ran for 35 yards on 6 carries. Percy Harvin carried the ball 11 times for 113 yards and two touchdowns and also caught 9 passes for 110 yards receiving, becoming the first player in school history to have over 100 yards rushing and receiving in the same game. Florida leads with a lopsided 30–9–2 record and has won the last 17 games in a row.

=== South Carolina ===
Florida Gators (6–3) at South Carolina Gamecocks (6–4)

Quarter	1	2	3	4	Total
Florida	13	14	10	14	51
South Carolina	14	0	10	7	31

at Williams–Brice Stadium • Columbia, South Carolina

- Date: November 10
- Game time: 7:45 p.m. EDT
- Game weather: Clear • 53 °F (12 °C) • Wind N/NE 3 miles per hour (4.8 km/h; 2.6 kn)
- Game attendance: 81,215
- Referee: Thomas Ritter
- Automated ScoreBook

Game information

Florida

- Tim Tebow
  22/32, 304 Yds, 2 TD, INT
  26 Rush, 120 Yds, 5 TD
- Andre Caldwell
  11 Rec, 148 Yds, TD

South Carolina

- Blake Mitchell
  26/42, 316 Yds, TD, INT
- Cory Boyd
  17 Rush, 44 Yds, 3 TD
- Kenny McKinley
  7 Rec, 95 Yds

Florida traveled to Columbia and renewed their budding rivalry with a win over the Gamecocks. The Gators now lead the all-time series 21–4–3, although the annual contest has become much more intense since Heisman Trophy-winning ex-Gator quarterback and championship-winning ex-Gator head coach Steve Spurrier took the reins at South Carolina for the 2005 season. Spurrier's new team upset his old team in 2005, and only a blocked last-second field goal kept him from repeating that feat in Gainesville in 2006. Florida quarterback Tim Tebow set a career-high in passing yards in the game with 304 yards. He also set a new school record for rushing touchdowns by a QB in a game with 5 breaking the old record held by ex-Florida QB Jesse Palmer. The first of these five rushing touchdowns broke the school record for most rushing touchdowns. Tebow was tied with Emmitt Smith and Buford Long with 14 rushing touchdowns in the season entering this game. This was also Florida's first game of the season without leading receiver Percy Harvin due to a sinus infection.

Scoring summary

Quarter	Time	Drive			Team	Scoring information	Score	
Quarter	Time	Plays	Yards	TOP	Team	Scoring information	FLA	SCAR
1	12:46	5	21	2:04	Florida	Tim Tebow 5-yard touchdown run, Joey Ijjas kick good	7	0
1	11:00	2	22	0:12	Florida	Jarred Fayson 22-yard touchdown reception from Tim Tebow, Joey Ijjas kick no good	13	0
1	9:00	5	65	2:00	South Carolina	Jared Cook 5-yard touchdown reception from Blake Mitchell, Ryan Succop kick good	13	7
1	2:21	2	23	0:19	South Carolina	Corey Boyd 2-yard touchdown run, Ryan Succop kick good	13	14
2	12:32	11	66	4:49	Florida	Tim Tebow 1-yard touchdown run, Joey Ijjas kick good	20	14
2	10:13	5	44	1:47	Florida	Tim Tebow 3-yard touchdown run, Joey Ijjas kick good	27	14
3	12:42	4	80	2:18	Florida	Tim Tebow 2-yard touchdown run, Joey Ijjas kick good	34	14
3	9:10	12	47	3:32	South Carolina	44-yard field goal by Ryan Succop	34	17
3	6:06	7	19	3:04	Florida	34-yard field goal by Joey Ijjas	37	17
3	4:13	6	65	1:53	South Carolina	Cory Boyd 3-yard touchdown run, Ryan Succop kick good	37	24
4	13:26	11	59	5:47	Florida	Tim Tebow 5-yard touchdown run, Joey Ijjas kick good	44	24
4	4:08	8	87	2:51	South Carolina	Cory Boyd 2-yard touchdown run, Ryan Succop kick good	44	31
4	1:37	5	40	2:31	Florida	Andre Caldwell 21-yard touchdown reception from Tim Tebow, Joey Ijjas kick good	51	31
"TOP" = time of possession. For other American football terms, see Glossary of American football.							51	21

=== Florida Atlantic ===
Florida Atlantic @ Florida

Team	1	2	3	4	Total
FAU	0	20	0	0	20
• Florida	21	14	14	10	59

- Location: Ben Hill Griffin Stadium, Gainesville, Florida

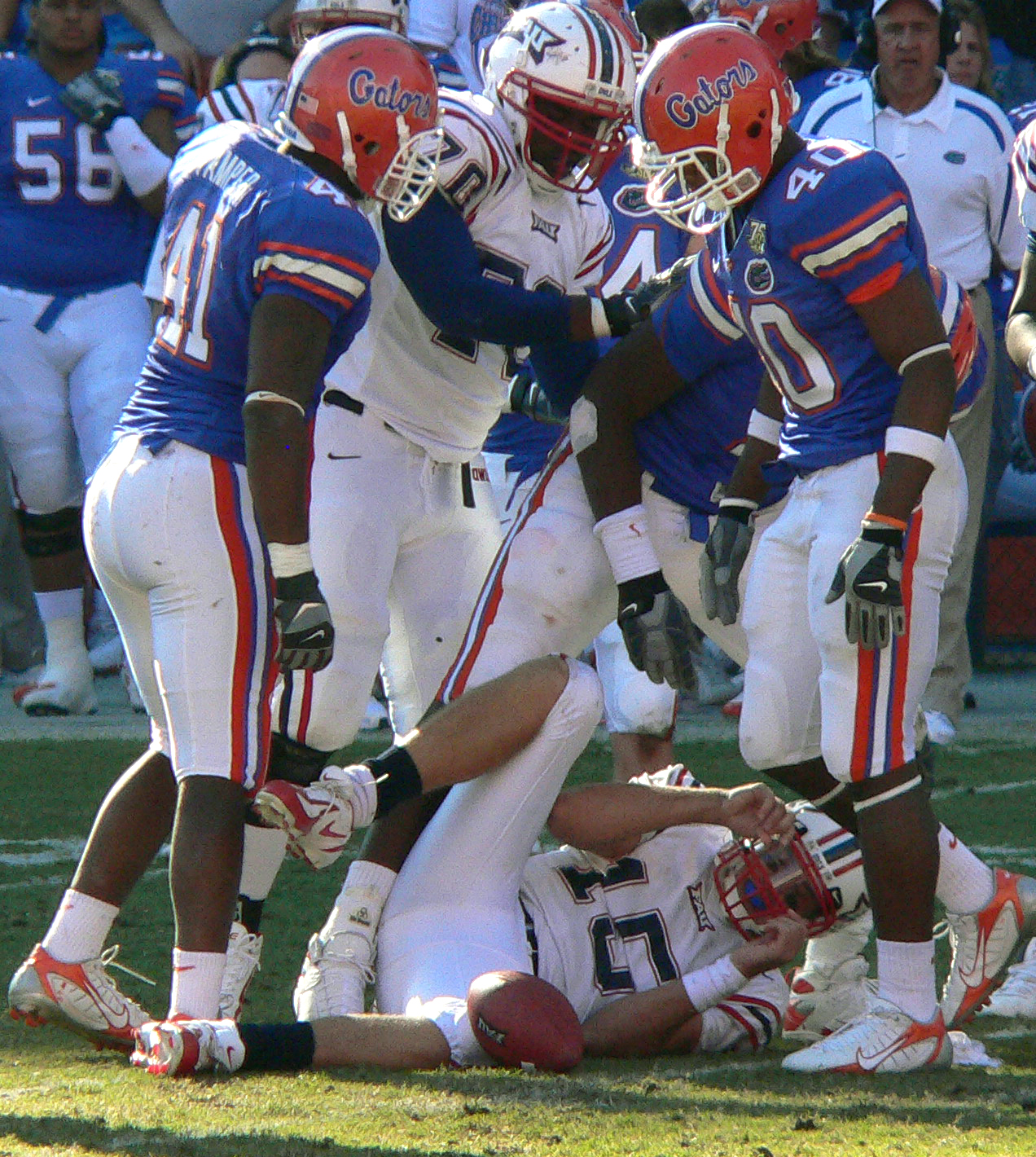
Florida sacks Florida Atlantic's quarterback.

The FAU Owls traveled to Gainesville for the first meeting between the two teams. This marked the third game of the season where the Gators faced an opponent for the first time. Tim Tebow rushed for his 20th touchdown of the season in the 2nd quarter setting a new SEC record for rushing touchdowns in a season. Tebow finished last week's game with 19 total rushing touchdowns leaving him tied with Shaun Alexander, LaBrandon Toefield, and Garrison Hearst. He also became the first quarterback in Division I-FBS history to pass for at least 20 touchdowns and rush for at least 20 touchdowns in the same season. He also set a career best in passing yards with 338.

The record-setting day continued when Gators' wide receiver Andre Caldwell set a new school record for career receptions with 177 breaking the prior record held by Carlos Alvarez with 172. This was the second game in a row where Florida wide receiver Percy Harvin was absent with a sinus infection and migraine headaches.

=== Florida State ===
Florida State @ Florida

Team	1	2	3	4	Total
Florida State	3	9	0	0	12
• Florida	14	10	7	14	45

- Date: November 24
- Location: Ben Hill Griffin Stadium, Gainesville, Florida
- Game start: 5:00 p.m. EST
- TV announcers (CBS): Verne Lundquist (play-by-play), Gary Danielson (color), Tracy Wolfson (sideline)
- Source: Florida State vs. Florida - College Football Game Recap - November 24, 2007

Scoring summary
1	9:13	FSU	Gary Cismesia 21-yard field goal	FSU 3-0
1	6:28	FLA	Tim Tebow 23-yard run (Joey Ijjas kick)	FLA 7-3
1	2:46	FLA	Louis Murphy 32-yard pass from Tim Tebow (Joey Ijjas kick)	FLA 14-3
2	12:22	FSU	Gary Cismesia 38-yard field goal	FLA 14-6
2	8:48	FLA	Louis Murphy 14-yard pass from Tim Tebow (Joey Ijjas kick)	FLA 21-6
2	4:21	FSU	Gary Cismesia 28-yard field goal	FLA 21-9
2	0:18	FLA	Joey Ijjas 35-yard field goal	FLA 24-9
2	0:00	FSU	Gary Cismesia 60-yard field goal	FLA 24-12
3	12:14	FLA	Tim Tebow 5-yard run (Joey Ijjas kick)	FLA 31-12
4	8:20	FLA	Andre Caldwell 31-yard pass from Tim Tebow (Joey Ijjas kick)	FLA 38-12
4	3:00	FLA	Percy Harvin 24-yard run (Joey Ijjas kick)	FLA 45-12

Senior day in the Swamp saw the Gators start strong, scoring four touchdowns and a field goal on their first five possessions en route to a 45–12 victory over the in-state rival Florida State Seminoles. The Gator offense compiled 541 total yards to the Seminoles' 287, and were often able to finish drives with touchdowns while Florida State was forced to settle for field goals. One of FSU kicker Gary Cismesia's four FGs was a school record 60-yard effort on the last play of the 1st half to cut his team's deficit to 24–12 at intermission. However, the momentum was short-lived, as Florida went on a 6-play, 81-yard scoring drive without throwing a pass to open the 2nd half and cruised from then on.

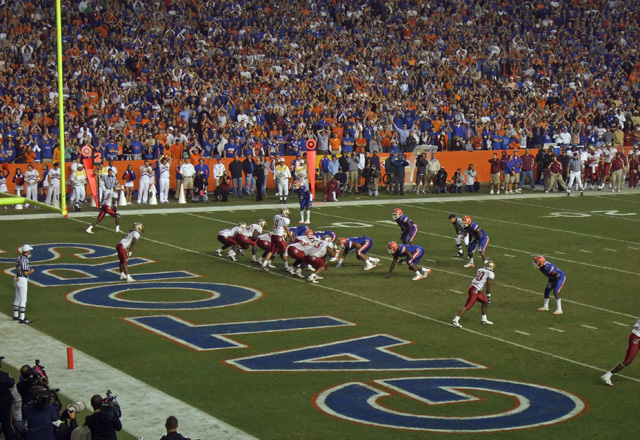
Florida State starts a drive deep in its own territory.

That 3rd-quarter touchdown was the second rushing TD of the contest for Gator QB Tim Tebow and his 22nd of the year, tying the NCAA Division I-FBS record for most rushing touchdowns in a season by a quarterback. Despite suffering a fractured hand on that run, he remained in the game and threw his third touchdown pass of the game in the 4th quarter, giving him 5 total TDs in the contest and 51 for the season. With his 262 passing yards and 89 rushing, Tebow set a new school record for most yards of total offense in a season with 3,970, surpassing Rex Grossman's 2001 total.

Gator RB/WR Percy Harvin did his part as well, returning from a 2-game absence to rush 16 times for a game-high 157 yards and a touchdown and catch 5 passes for another 67 yards.

The Gators' winning streak versus FSU grew to four games with this victory, including a 21–14 triumph in Tallahassee in 2006. Florida leads the all-time series 31-19-2. It also marked the fourth win of the season in which the Gators defeated a team led by a former national championship winning coach (Bobby Bowden, Howard Schnellenberger, Phillip Fulmer, and Steve Spurrier being those coaches).

=== Michigan ===
Capital One Bowl

Team	1	2	3	4	Total
• Michigan	7	14	7	13	41
Florida	7	7	14	7	35

- Date: January 1, 2008

The Florida Gators closed out the 2007 season against the Michigan Wolverines on New Years Day in the Capital One Bowl. This was only the second meeting between the two storied programs with the first having taken place a short five seasons ago in the Outback Bowl. Lloyd Carr coached his Wolverines for the final time with the announcement of his retirement shortly after his final regular season game against rival Ohio State.

Urban Meyer and the Gators were looking to carry their momentum from the second half of the season with Heisman-winning sophomore Tim Tebow into the bowl game. Coming off of two consecutive regular season losses, the Wolverines were attempting to break their four bowl game losing streak. Ironically, their last bowl game win came against the Ron Zook coached Gators following the 2002 season. This was the fifth game of the season where the Gators played a team led by a former national championship winning head coach.

The Gators lost the game 41–35 as Michigan barraged the Gator defense for over 500 yards of offense. Chad Henne finished his career at the University of Michigan with a victory in a bowl game, the first in five seasons, and finished with a career-high in passing yards. The newly named Michigan head coach, Rich Rodriguez, could be seen during the game along the Michigan sidelines.

== Personnel ==
=== Coaching staff ===
- Urban Meyer – head coach – 2 years at UF
- Steve Addazio – Tackles/tight ends – 2 years
- Stan Drayton – Running backs – 2 years
- Billy Gonzales – Wide receivers – 2 years
- Chuck Heater – Recruiting coordinator/cornerbacks – 2 years
- John Hevesy – Centers/guards – 2 years
- John "Doc" Holliday – Associate head coach/safeties – 2 years
- Greg Mattison – Co-Defensive coordinator/defensive line – 2 years
- Dan Mullen – Offensive coordinator/quarterbacks – 2 years
- Charlie Strong – Assistant head coach/co-Defensive coordinator/linebackers – 7 years

=== Roster ===
2007 Florida Gators roster
Quarterbacks: 3 Brandon Frazier – Freshman; 10 Bryan Waggener – Junior; 12 John Brantley – Freshman; 13 Cam Newton – Freshman; 14 Andrew Blaylock – (redshirt) Freshman; 15 Tim Tebow – Sophomore; 46 Michael Guilford – (redshirt) Freshman; Running backs: 8 Chris Rainey – Freshman; 21 Emmanuel Moody – Sophomore; 25 Brandon James – Sophomore; 27 Mon Williams – Sophomore; 28 Chevon Walker – (redshirt) Freshman; 33 Kestahn Moore – Junior; 34 Bo Williams – Freshman; H-Backs: 29 Eric Rutledge – Senior; Fullbacks: 45 Bo Howard – (redshirt) Freshman; 49 Andrew Johnson – (redshirt) Sophomore; Wide receivers: 1 Percy Harvin – Sophomore; 5 Andre Caldwell – (redshirt) Senior; 6 Deonte Thompson – Freshman; 9 Louis Murphy – Junior; 11 Jarred Fayson – Sophomore; 21 Kile Matthews – Freshman; 23 Cade Holliday – (redshirt) Sophomore; 24 Chris Jones – Freshman; 39 Joey Sorrentino – (redshirt) Sophomore; 83 David Nelson – (redshirt) Sophomore; 86 Riley Cooper – Sophomore; 87 Justin Williams – (redshirt) Freshman; 88 Paul Wilson – Freshman; Tight ends: 7 Cornelius Ingram – (redshirt) Junior; 62 Lamar Abel – Freshman; 81 Aaron Hernandez – Freshman; 84 Tate Casey – Senior; 89 Derek Baldry – (redshirt) Junior	Offensive line: 55 Mike Pouncey – Freshman; 56 Maurkice Pouncey – Freshman; 57 Carl Johnson – (redshirt) Freshman; 62 Lamar Abel – Freshman; 63 Jim Tartt – (redshirt) Junior; 64 Kyle Newell – (redshirt) Sophomore; 65 Brad Hiers – (redshirt) Sophomore; 66 James Wilson – Freshman; 67 Drew Miller – Senior; 68 Jim Barrie – Sophomore; 69 Eddie Haupt – (redshirt) Sophomore; 71 Corey Hobbs – (redshirt) Freshman; 72 Shawn Schmieder – Freshman; 73 Carlton Medder – (redshirt) Senior; 74 Maurice Hurt – (redshirt) Freshman; 75 Phil Trautwein – Senior; 76 Marcus Gilbert – (redshirt) Freshman; 77 Jason Watkins – (redshirt) Junior; 78 Simon Codrington – (redshirt) Sophomore; 79 Jamael Autry – (redshirt) Freshman; Defensive line: 6 Jaye Howard – Freshman; 8 Carlos Dunlap – Freshman; 44 Duke Lemmens – Freshman; 47 Brandon Antwine – Sophomore; 49 Jermaine Cunningham – Sophomore; 59 John Fairbanks – (redshirt) Freshman; 61 Vernon Shelton – Senior; 80 Trent Pupello – (redshirt) Freshman; 90 Lawrence Marsh – (redshirt) Freshman; 91 Derrick Harvey – (redshirt) Junior; 92 Terron Sanders – (redshirt) Freshman; 93 Javier Estopinan – (redshirt) Junior; 94 Justin Trattou – Freshman; 95 Torrey Davis – Freshman; 97 John Brown – Freshman; 98 Clint McMillan – (redshirt) Senior; 99 Lutrell Alford – Senior	Linebackers: 16 A.J. Jones – (redshirt) Freshman; 26 Lorenzo Edwards – Freshman; 30 John Jones – Freshman; 32 Dustin Doe – Sophomore; 40 Brandon Hicks – Sophomore; 41 Ryan Stamper – (redshirt) Sophomore; 42 Steven Wilks – Freshman; 50 Chris Pintado – (redshirt) Freshman; 51 Brandon Spikes – Sophomore; 53 Jamaal Deveaux – (redshirt) Sophomore; 54 Roderick Blackett – (redshirt) Sophomore; Defensive backs: 12 Joe Haden – Freshman; 27 Telly Concepcion - (redshirt) Junior; 33 Moise Paul – (redshirt) Senior; 34 Reginald Hopkins – Freshman; 42 Miguel Carodine – (redshirt) Freshman; 47 Michael Smith – Freshman; 48 Marquis Hannah – Freshman; Cornerbacks: 2 Markus Manson – (redshirt) Junior; 4 Wondy Pierre-Louis – Sophomore; 14 Markihe Anderson – Sophomore; 22 Ahmad Black – Freshman; 23 Jacques Rickerson – (redshirt) Freshman; 29 Rashad Dunbar – Freshman; 36 Moses Jenkins – Freshman; 37 Vincent Brown – Freshman; 38 Lorenzo Campbell – (redshirt) Junior	Safeties: 3 Kyle Jackson – Senior; 7 Jamar Hornsby – (redshirt) Freshman; 17 Curtis Carr – (redshirt) Sophomore; 18 Jerimy Finch – Freshman; 19 Tony Joiner – Senior; 20 Dorian Munroe – (redshirt) Sophomore; 21 Major Wright – Freshman; 24 John Curtis – (redshirt) Junior; 31 Bryan Thomas – (redshirt) Freshman; 35 Cody Worton – (redshirt) Freshman; Punters: 17 Chas Henry – Freshman; 96 Justin Burdette – Freshman; 97 Alex Harrell – (redshirt) Freshman; Kickers: 38 Jonathan Phillips – Junior; 82 Jordan Means – Freshman; 85 Andrew Fritze – (redshirt) Sophomore; 85 Greg Taussig – (redshirt) Sophomore; 92 Bobby Kane – (redshirt) Sophomore; 98 Joey Ijjas – (redshirt) Senior; Long snappers: 37 Butch Rowley – (redshirt) Junior; 43 James Smith – (redshirt) Junior; 58 Mike Williamson – (redshirt) Sophomore

=== Depth chart ===
Defense

FS
Major Wright
Kyle Jackson

WLB	Middle LB	SLB
⋅	Brandon Spikes	⋅
Brandon Hicks	Ryan Stamper	⋅

SS
Tony Joiner
Dorian Munroe

CB
Joe Haden
Jacques Rickerson

DE	DT	DT	DE
Jermaine Cunningham	Clint McMillan	Javier Estopiñan	Derrick Harvey
Duke Lemmens	Lutrell Alford	Mike Pouncey	Carlos Dunlap

CB
Markihe Anderson
Wondy Pierre-Louis

Offense

WR
Andre Caldwell
Riley Cooper

WR
Percy Harvin
Jarred Fayson

LT	LG	C	RG	RT
Phil Trautwein	Jim Tartt	Drew Miller	Carlton Medder	Jason Watkins
Carl Johnson	Maurkice Pouncey	Mike Pouncey	Maurice Hurt	Marcus Gilbert

TE
Cornelius Ingram
Tate Casey

WR
Louis Murphy
David Nelson

QB
Tim Tebow
Cam Newton

Key reserves
FB Eric Rutledge
FB Andrew Johnson
LS Butch Rowley

RB
Kestahn Moore
Markus Manson

Special teams
PK Joey Ijjas
PK Jonathan Phillips
P Chas Henry
P Bobby Kane
KR Kestahn Moore
PR Brandon James
LS James Smith

== Awards and honors ==
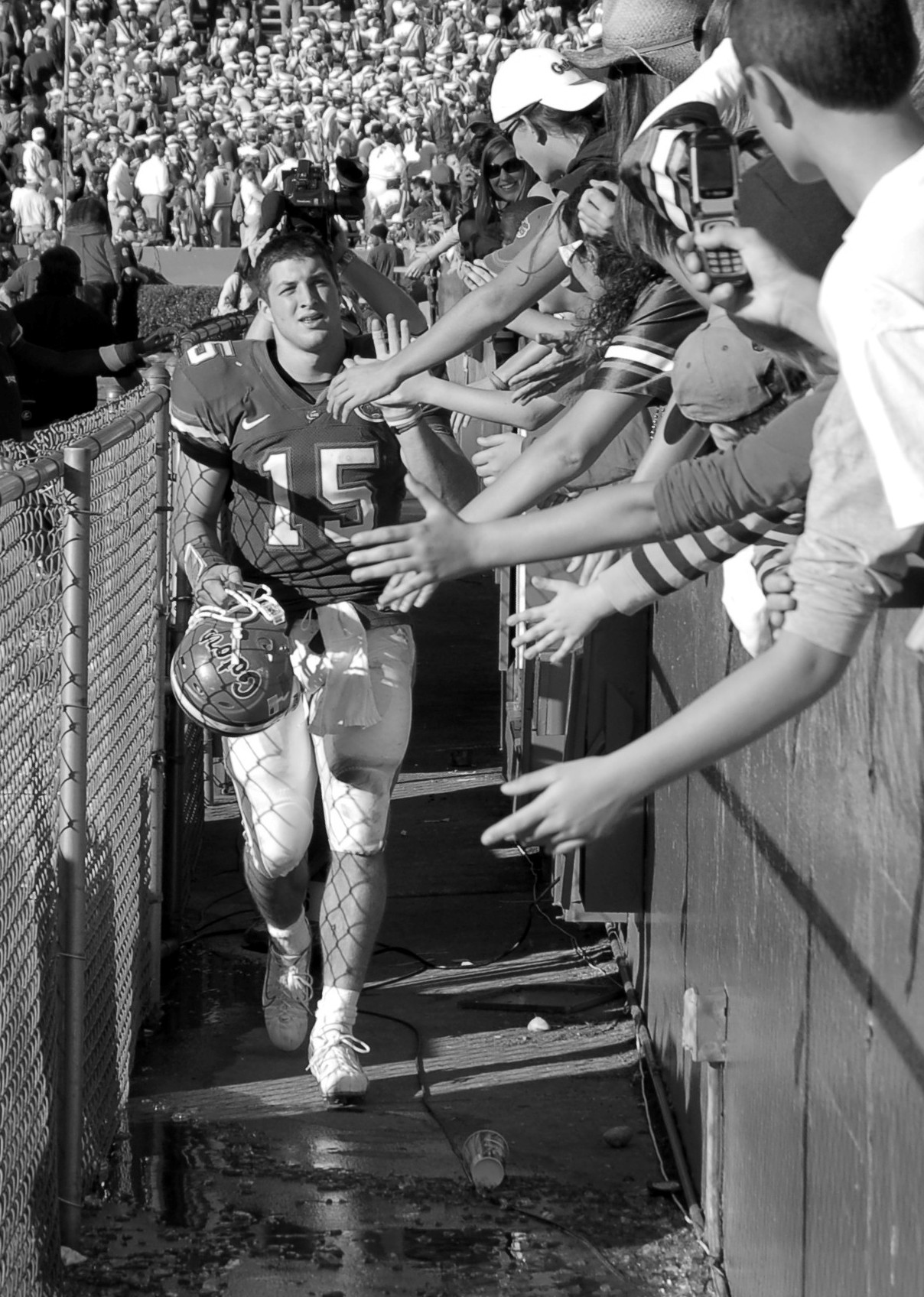
Tim Tebow in 2007

=== Associated Press All-SEC ===
All-SEC First Team
- Tim Tebow, QB
- Percy Harvin, (all purpose)
- Brandon Spikes, LB

All-SEC Second Team
- Percy Harvin, WR
- Cornelius Ingram, TE
- Brandon James, (all purpose)

SEC Offensive Player of the Year
- Tim Tebow, QB

=== Coaches All-SEC ===
All-SEC First Team
- Tim Tebow, QB
- Brandon Spikes, LB

All-SEC Second Team
- Cornelius Ingram, TE
- Carlton Medder, OL
- Jim Tartt, OL
- Percy Harvin, WR
- Derrick Harvey, DE
- Brandon James, RS

Freshman All-SEC Team
- Maurkice Pouncey, OL
- A.J. Jones, LB
- Joe Haden, DB
- Major Wright, DB

=== National awards and honors ===
Maxwell Award
- Tim Tebow, QB

AP Player of the Year
- Tim Tebow, QB

Sullivan Award
- Tim Tebow, QB
Davey O'Brien Award
- Tim Tebow, QB

Walter Camp All-American
- Tim Tebow, QB

Heisman Memorial Trophy Award
- Tim Tebow, QB

Tebow was the first sophomore to win the Heisman Trophy. He garnered 462 first-place votes and 1,957 points, 254 points ahead of the runner-up, Arkansas running back Darren McFadden. Tebow finished the regular season with the second highest passing efficiency in the nation with 177.8. Additionally, he averaged 4.3 yards per carry on the ground.

== Players drafted into the NFL ==
Round	Pick	Player	Position	NFL club
1	8	Derrick Harvey	DE	Jacksonville Jaguars
3	97	Andre Caldwell	WR	Cincinnati Bengals
