= Andre Caldwell =

American football player (born 1985)

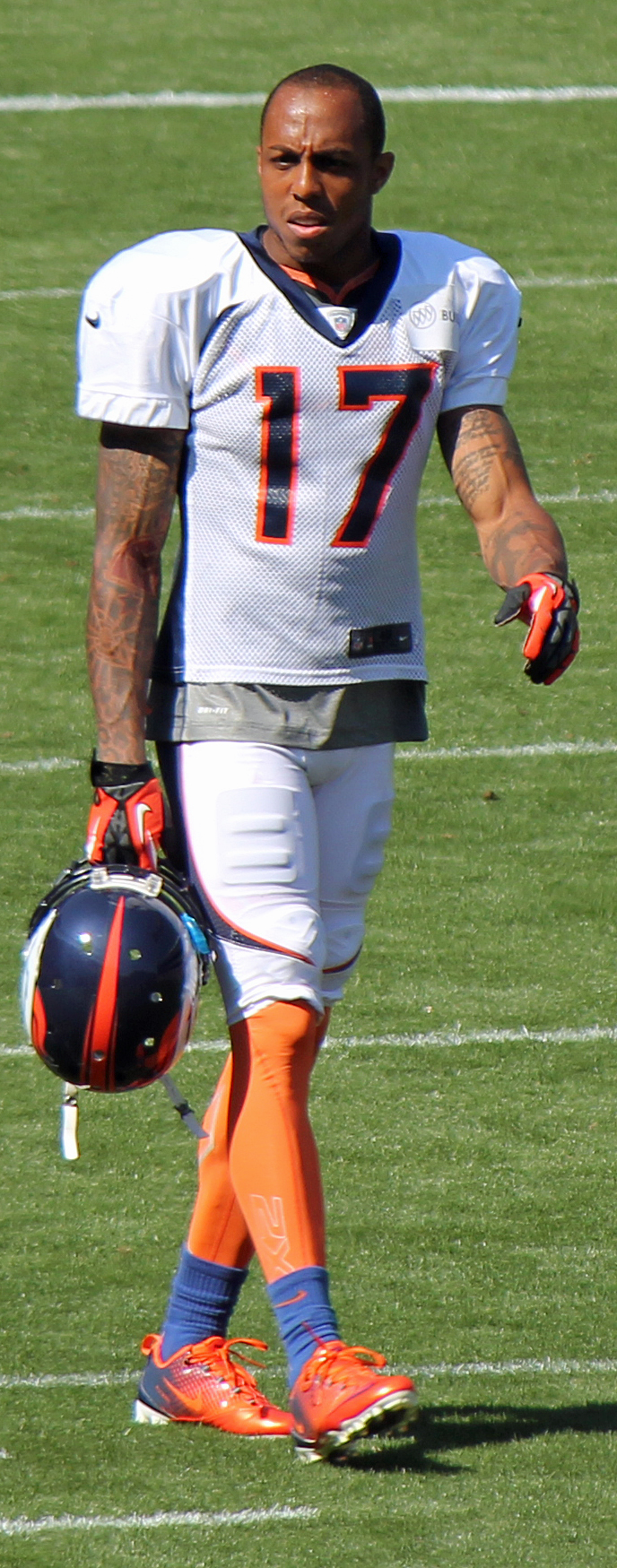
- Caldwell with the Denver Broncos in 2012

No. 87, 17, 12
- Position: Wide receiver

Personal information
- Born: April 15, 1985 (age 41); Tampa, Florida, U.S.
- Listed height: 6 ft 0 in (1.83 m)
- Listed weight: 200 lb (91 kg)

Career information
- High school: Thomas Jefferson (Tampa)
- College: Florida (2003–2007)
- NFL draft: 2008: 3rd round, 97th overall pick

Career history
- Cincinnati Bengals (2008–2011); Denver Broncos (2012–2015); Detroit Lions (2016)*
- * Offseason or practice squad member only

Awards and highlights
- Super Bowl champion (50); BCS national champion (2007)

Career NFL statistics
- Receptions: 156
- Receiving yards: 1,509
- Receiving touchdowns: 11
- Return yards: 1,537
- Stats at Pro Football Reference

Andre Jerome "Bubba" Caldwell (born April 15, 1985) is an American former professional football player who was a wide receiver and kickoff returner in the National Football League (NFL). Caldwell played college football for the Florida Gators, where he was a member of a BCS National Championship team. A third-round pick in the 2008 NFL draft, he played professionally for the Cincinnati Bengals and Denver Broncos. With the Broncos, he won Super Bowl 50 against the Carolina Panthers.

== Early life ==
Caldwell was born in Tampa, Florida in 1985. He attended Tampa's Jefferson High School, where he played football and ran track. In football, he played quarterback and also lined up at receiver and returned punts for the Dragons. His senior year, he moved from wide receiver to starting quarterback, and passed and rushed for over 2,220 yards and thirty-eight touchdowns while leading the Dragons to a Florida Class 4A state championship game appearance. He was the Tampa Tribune's Hillsborough County Player of the Year, an all-state selection, and was named a Parade magazine, SuperPrep and USA Today high school All-American following his senior season in 2002. He played in the 2003 U.S. Army All-American Bowl.

Considered a five-star recruit by Rivals.com, Caldwell was listed as the No. 1 wide receiver in the nation in 2003.

Also a standout athlete, Caldwell competed in track as sophomore and junior. At the 2002 Florida Class 3A Region 3 meet, he recorded a personal-best time of 10.39 seconds in the 100 meters to win region title. He got a PR of 21.71 seconds in the 200 meters. As a Florida collegiate, he joined the Gators track & field team following the conclusion of spring football practice. He finished 19th in 100m with time of 10.74 in the only meet of the season at the SEC Outdoor Championships. This was his first competition on the track in four years.

== College career ==
Caldwell accepted an athletic scholarship to attend the University of Florida in Gainesville, where he played for coach Ron Zook and coach Urban Meyer from 2003 to 2007. In part because of his brother Reche's legacy as a Gator, and in part because of his friendship with Florida commitment and quarterback Chris Leak, Caldwell chose to play for the Gators.

As a true freshman seeing limited playing time, he had just nineteen receptions for 174 receiving yards. During his sophomore season in 2004, Caldwell's production jumped to forty-three catches and three receiving touchdowns, as well as two rushes for sixty-six yards and one score. He received a medical redshirt for the 2005 season after fracturing his leg in an early-season Southeastern Conference (SEC) game against the Tennessee Volunteers. During his junior season, he emerged as the team's second leading wide receiver in catches (57), yards (577) and touchdowns (6), and also threw for a touchdown pass in the Gators 38–28 victory over the Arkansas Razorbacks in the 2006 SEC Championship Game. As a junior in 2006, he threw a seven-yard touchdown pass to help the Gators win their seventh SEC championship. Four weeks later, the Gators defeated Ohio State to win their first BCS Championship Game and the second national championship in team history.

Just days after the championship, Caldwell announced he would return to Florida for his senior season. As a senior team captain in 2007, Caldwell recorded a career-high 761 yards and seven touchdowns on fifty-six receptions, had twelve carries for fifty-eight rushing yards and a touchdown, and was the recipient of the Gators' Fergie Ferguson Award as the "senior football player who displays outstanding leadership, character and courage." Caldwell finished his senior season with 100-yard receiving games against the Western Kentucky Hilltoppers, Vanderbilt Commodores, South Carolina Gamecocks, and Florida Atlantic Owls. His 185 receptions in his four-year college career remains the best career total in Gators history.

Caldwell graduated from the University of Florida with a bachelor's degree in sociology in December 2007.

== Professional career ==
Pre-draft measurables
Height	Weight	Arm length	Hand span	40-yard dash	10-yard split	20-yard split	20-yard shuttle	Three-cone drill	Vertical jump	Broad jump	Bench press
6 ft 0 1/4 in (1.84 m)	204 lb (93 kg)	32 3/4 in (0.83 m)	9 1/8 in (0.23 m)	4.37 s	1.55 s	2.55 s	4.11 s	6.75 s	36.5 in (0.93 m)	10 ft 4 in (3.15 m)	18 reps
All values from NFL Combine/Pro Day

=== Cincinnati Bengals ===
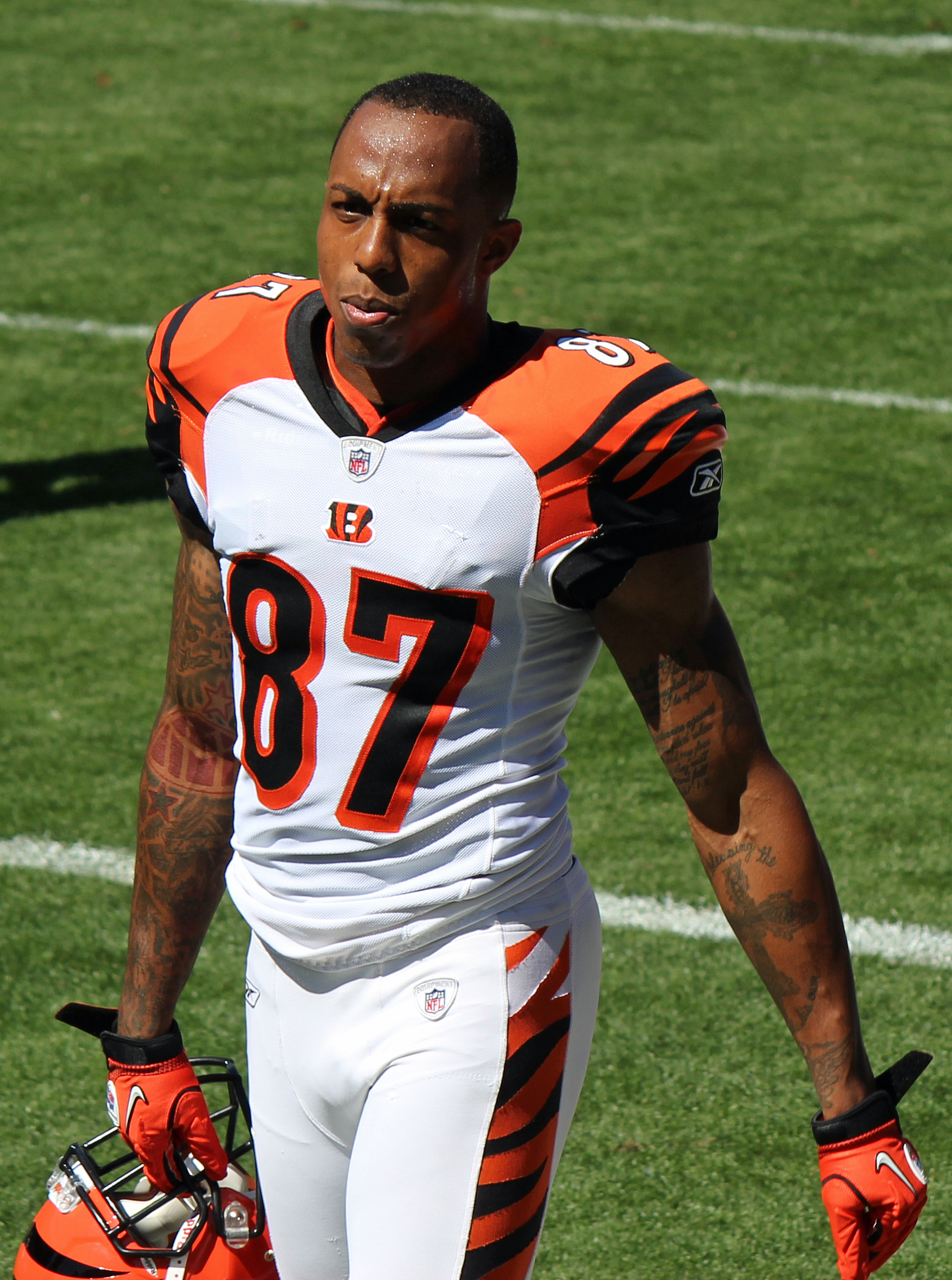
Caldwell with the Bengals in 2011

The Cincinnati Bengals chose Caldwell in the third round (ninety-seventh overall pick) in the 2008 NFL draft, and played for the Bengals for four seasons from 2008 to 2011. In his rookie year, he made contributions in late season as a receiver and kickoff returner, and finished with eleven receptions for seventy-eight yards, a 26-yard average on thirteen kickoff returns, and five rushes for fifty-three yards during his rookie season.

Caldwell caught his first career touchdown, a game-winning touchdown against the Pittsburgh Steelers on September 27, 2009. In Week 5, Caldwell caught another game-winning touchdown pass against the Baltimore Ravens with 20 seconds to go in the game. He finished the 2009 season with 51 receptions for 432 receiving yards and three receiving touchdowns in 16 games and three starts. In the 2010 season, Caldwell had 25 receptions for 345 receiving yards in 15 games and five starts. In the 2011 season, Caldwell had 37 receptions for 317 receiving yards and three receiving touchdowns in 13 games and two starts.

=== Denver Broncos ===
Caldwell signed a two-year deal with the Denver Broncos on March 21, 2012. He appeared in eight games in the 2012 season. In the 2013 season, he had 16 receptions for 200 receiving yards and three touchdowns in 16 games and two starts. Two of his three touchdowns came in a Week 15 loss on Thursday Night Football to the San Diego Chargers. Caldwell saw more snaps in that game due to Wes Welker being inactive after he suffered his second concussion of the season four days earlier in a win over Tennessee.

Caldwell was re-signed by the Broncos to a two-year deal on March 11, 2014. The contract is worth up to $3.5 million. In the 2014 season, Caldwell appeared in 16 games and started two. He finished with five receptions for 47 yards. In the 2015 season, Caldwell had ten receptions for 72 yards and two touchdown in 14 games. On February 7, 2016, Caldwell was part of the Broncos team that won Super Bowl 50. In the game, the Broncos defeated the Carolina Panthers by a score of 24–10. Caldwell had one catch for 22 yards in the Super Bowl. His catch occurred on the Broncos' opening drive and contributed to them getting into field goal range.

=== Detroit Lions ===
On May 4, 2016, the Detroit Lions signed Caldwell to a one-year contract. On August 22, 2016, Caldwell was released by the Lions.

== Personal life ==
Caldwell is the younger brother of the late Reche Caldwell (1979–2020), who was a former NFL wide receiver and Florida Gators star.

== See also ==
- History of the Cincinnati Bengals
- List of Florida Gators in the NFL draft
- List of University of Florida alumni
