= Eutaxiology =

Eutaxiology (from the Greek eu – good, and tax – order) is the philosophical study of order and design. It is distinguished from teleology in that it does not focus on the purpose or goal of a given structure or process, merely the degree and complexity of the structure or process.

== History ==
The term "eutaxiology" was first coined by geologist Lewis Ezra Hicks in his Critique of Design Arguments, in which he argued that the "good order" of the universe by itself can be used to argue for the existence of God in place of the teleological argument, which he finds fatally flawed. However, the concept had been around for centuries, most notably in the works of Aristotle, who offered in Physics the idea of natural design without a designer, stating that "It is absurd to suppose that ends are not present [in nature] because we do not see an agent deliberating". Lucretius, who was also a supporter of accidentalism, similarly stated in De Rerum Natura, "Nothing in the body is made in order that we may use it. What happens to exist is the cause of its use".

== Teleology ==
Eutaxiology is often mistaken for teleology, the study of purpose and design. However, it can be argued that eutaxiology and teleology are in fact complements to each other by stating that a good design and order necessarily implies the ability to achieve a goal or purpose. The two terms are also often used as arguments against each other, implying that eutaxiology is the observation of a process that occurs by chance, while teleology is always designed by some designer.

== Religion ==
As a result, the eutaxiology is often used in religious arguments, particularly concerning the existence of God, though it is used in both sides of the argument. In complement with teleology, it can be argued that the basic principles of physics and chemistry are designed in a way that supports organic life. On the other hand, skeptics point to evolutionary biology, claiming that if the Earth were perfectly designed by a perfect creator, the long and sometimes unsuccessful process of evolution would not have had to have taken place. Critics of this theory claim that evolutionary biology is in fact evidence of intelligent design and therefore God, pointing to the eventual development of the human brain, which could engineer society.

== Philosophy ==
In this regard, eutaxiology can also be applied to ethics, especially concerning ends justifying means, and whether or not ends do in fact depend on means. On a larger scale, eutaxiology can be used to argue either for or against Anthropic Principle. On one hand, it can be stated that observations made about the physical and metaphysical Universe must be compatible with the life observed in it. For example, people believe that the Universe was especially designed for them because they cannot fathom other, completely different Universes, implying existential epistemic eutaxiology. Conversely, It can be said that due to Occam's Razor, the universe must be especially designed for humans because of the intricacies of the design that allows us to live where and how we do. Metaphysically, this can be traced back to causal arguments (i.e. do humans exist because of intricate biochemical processes, or do they exist because God created these biochemical processes?)
