= Barry Brown (American football) =

American football player (1943–2020)

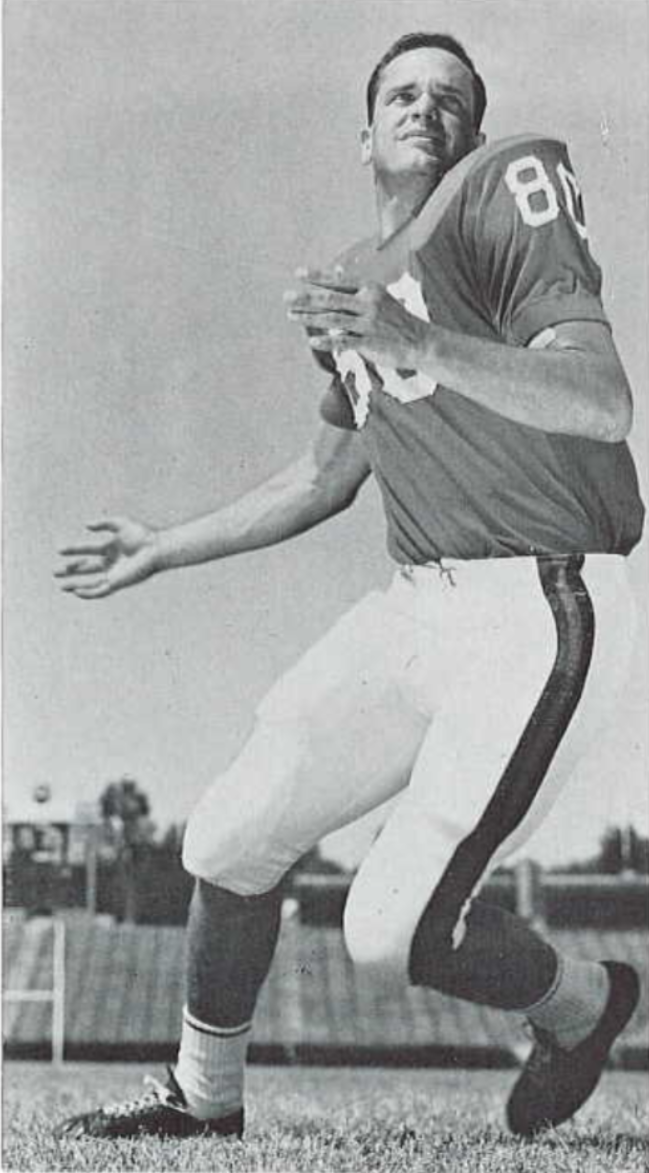
- Brown from 1965 Seminole yearbook

No. 36, 83, 66, 86
- Positions: Linebacker, tight end

Personal information
- Born: April 17, 1943; Boston, Massachusetts, U.S.
- Died: February 6, 2020 (aged 76)
- Listed height: 6 ft 3 in (1.91 m)
- Listed weight: 230 lb (104 kg)

Career information
- High school: Ann Arbor (Ann Arbor, Michigan)
- College: Florida
- NFL draft: 1965: 19th round, 266th overall pick
- AFL draft: 1965: Red Shirt 4th round, 25th overall pick

Career history
- Baltimore Colts (1966–1967); New York Giants (1968); Boston Patriots (1969–1970)

Awards and highlights
- Second-team All-SEC (1965)

Career NFL statistics
- Games played: 57
- Games started: 12
- Receptions: 21
- Receiving yards: 214
- Fumbles recovered: 2
- Interceptions: 1
- Stats at Pro Football Reference

Joseph Barry Brown (April 17, 1943 – February 6, 2020) was an American professional football player who was a linebacker and tight end for five seasons in the National Football League (NFL) and American Football League (AFL) during the 1960s and early 1970s. He played college football for the Florida Gators, and was selected in 19th round of the 1965 NFL draft. He played professionally for the Baltimore Colts, New York Giants and Boston Patriots.

== Early life ==
Brown was born in Boston, Massachusetts. He graduated from Ann Arbor High School in Ann Arbor, Michigan, and he played for the Ann Arbor Pioneers high school football team.

== College career ==
Brown attended the University of Florida, where he played for coach Ray Graves' Gators teams, lettering in 1964 and 1965. In the mid-1960s, when college football rules still required players to play both ways, Brown played linebacker on defense and tight end on offense. As a senior in 1965, he was a second-team All-Southeastern Conference (SEC) selection. Memorably, he caught nine passes from Gators quarterback Steve Spurrier in the 1966 Sugar Bowl—which remains tied for the third-most receptions in a single game in Gators history. He graduated from the university with a bachelor's degree in health and human performance in 1965.

== Professional career ==
The Baltimore Colts selected Brown in the 19th round (266th pick overall) of the 1965 NFL draft, and he played the linebacker position for the Colts in 1966 and 1967. He played in twenty-four regular season games for the Colts, all off the bench. In 1968, he played twelve games at linebacker for the New York Giants. Brown played for the Boston Patriots in 1969 and 1970, appeared in twenty-one games as a tight end and started twelve of them. In two seasons as an offensive lineman and eligible receiver, he caught twenty-one passes for 214 yards.

== See also ==
- Florida Gators football, 1960–69
- List of Florida Gators in the NFL draft
- List of New England Patriots players
- List of New York Giants players
- List of University of Florida alumni
