= John Brown (offensive lineman) =

American football player (born 1988)

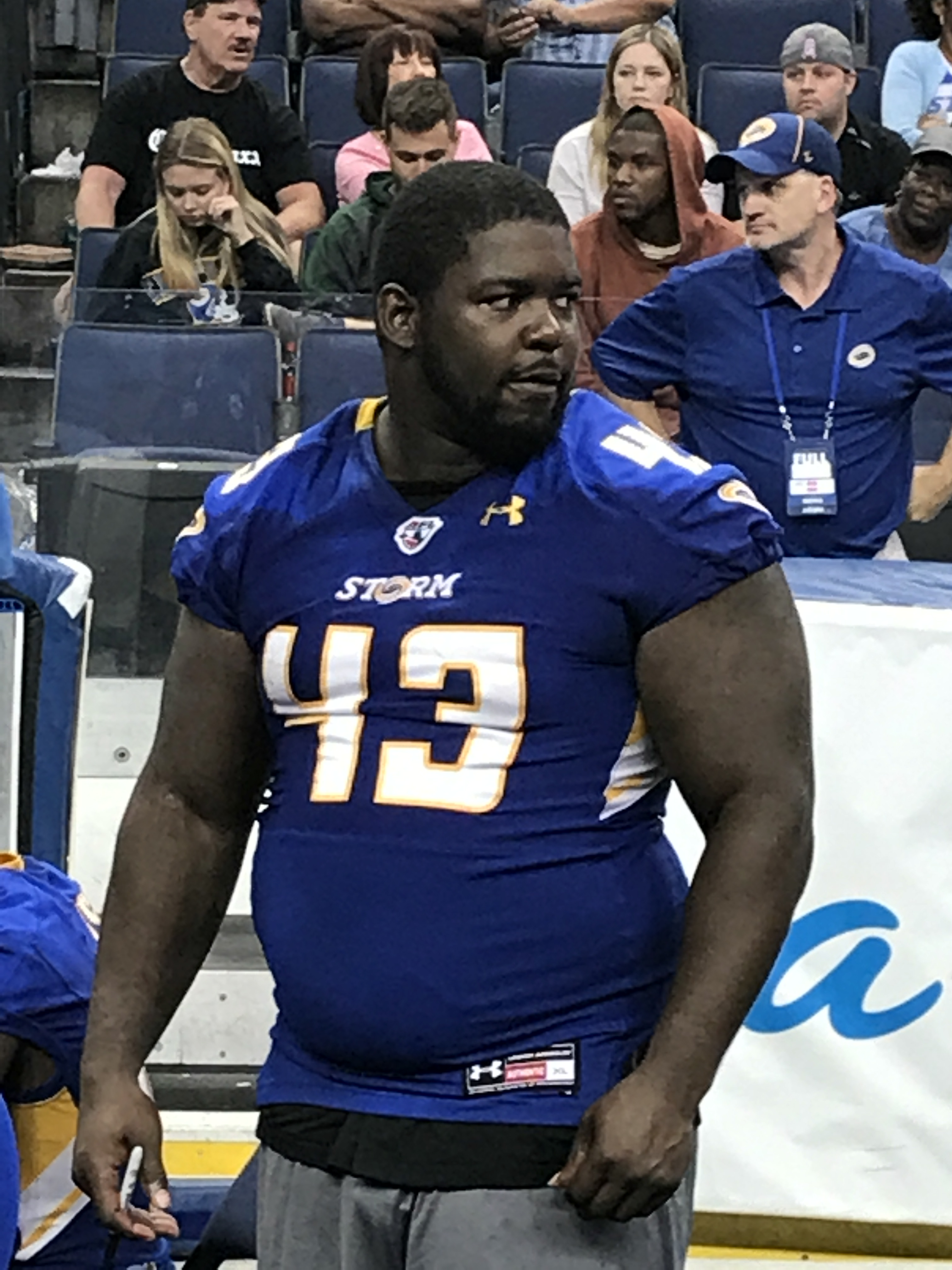
- Brown with the Tampa Bay Storm in 2017

No. 49, 43
- Position: Offensive lineman

Personal information
- Born: June 26, 1988 (age 38); Lakeland, Florida, U.S.
- Listed height: 6 ft 1 in (1.85 m)
- Listed weight: 285 lb (129 kg)

Career information
- High school: Lakeland (FL)
- College: Florida (2007–2008); Northwest Mississippi CC (2009); Valdosta State (2010)
- NFL draft: 2011: undrafted

Career history
- Tampa Bay Storm (2013)*; Orlando Predators (2015–2016)*; Tampa Bay Storm (2016–2017); Florida Tarpons (2018–2019)
- * Offseason or practice squad member only

Career AFL statistics
- Rushing attempts: 12
- Rushing yards: 25
- Rushing touchdowns: 2
- Receptions: 2
- Receiving yards: 8
- Stats at ArenaFan.com

John Brown (born June 26, 1988) is an American former football offensive lineman. He played college football at University of Florida, Northwest Mississippi Community College and Valdosta State University and attended Lakeland High School in Lakeland, Florida. He was also a member of the Tampa Bay Storm, Orlando Predators, and Florida Tarpons.

== College career ==
Brown played for the Florida Gators from 2007 to 2008, Northwest Mississippi Rangers in 2009 and the Valdosta State Blazers in 2010. He played in zero games for the Gators, dressing for one game before having wrist surgery. After two years at Florida, Brown transferred to Northwest Mississippi Community College. After one season at Northwert Mississippi, Brown initially committed to Tennessee, but attended Valdosta State instead.

== Professional career ==
=== Tampa Bay Storm ===
Brown was assigned to the Tampa Bay Storm of the Arena Football League on July 18, 2013.

=== Orlando Predators ===
On July 30, 2015, Brown was assigned to the Orlando Predators. On August 30, 2015, Brown was placed on recallable reassignment. On March 9, 2016, Brown was assigned to the Predators once again. On March 25, 2016, Brown was placed on recallable reassignment.

=== Tampa Bay Storm ===
Brown was assigned to the Storm on May 19, 2016. Brown started 8 games at fullback for the Storm. He ran for 21 yards and two touchdowns. Following the season, the Storm picked up Brown's rookie option. Brown was named the starting fullback for the Storm in 2017. On May 11, 2017, Brown was placed on reassignment. Brown was assigned on May 16, 2017. On May 19, 2017, Brown was placed on reassignment once again. On June 8, 2017, Brown was assigned to the Storm. On June 15, 2017, Brown was placed on reassignment.

=== Florida Tarpons ===
Brown signed with the Florida Tarpons for the 2018 season.
