= Frank Lasky =

American football player (1941–2023)

No. 71, 58
- Position: Offensive tackle

Personal information
- Born: October 4, 1941; New York City, New York, U.S.
- Died: April 10, 2023 (aged 81); Franklin, North Carolina, U.S.
- Listed height: 6 ft 2 in (1.88 m)
- Listed weight: 265 lb (120 kg)

Career information
- High school: Coral Gables (FL)
- College: Florida (1959-1960, 1962-1963)
- NFL draft: 1963: 2nd round, 26th overall pick
- AFL draft: 1963: 14th round, 106th overall pick

Career history
- New York Giants (1964–1965); Atlanta Falcons (1966)*; Baltimore Colts (1967)*; Montreal Alouettes (1969); Jacksonville Sharks (1974)*
- * Offseason or practice squad member only

Career NFL statistics
- Games played: 18
- Games started: 9
- Stats at Pro Football Reference

Frank Lasky (October 4, 1941 – April 10, 2023) was an American football tackle. He played for the New York Giants from 1964 to 1965.

Lasky died on April 10, 2023, at the age of 81.
