= Jarred Fayson =

American gridiron football player (born 1987)

No. 11, 18
- Position: Wide receiver

Personal information
- Born: October 13, 1987 (age 39); North Charleston, South Carolina, U.S.
- Listed height: 6 ft 0 in (1.83 m)
- Listed weight: 213 lb (97 kg)

Career information
- High school: Hillsborough (Tampa, Florida)
- College: Illinois
- NFL draft: 2011: undrafted

Career history
- New Orleans Saints (2011)*; Indianapolis Colts (2011–2012)*; New England Patriots (2012)*; New Orleans Saints (2012–2013)*; Toronto Argonauts (2013–2015)
- * Offseason or practice squad member only
- Stats at Pro Football Reference

Jarred Michael Fayson (born October 13, 1987) is an American former football wide receiver. He was signed by the New Orleans Saints as an undrafted free agent in 2011. He played college football at Illinois.

== Professional career ==
=== New Orleans Saints ===
Fayson was signed as an undrafted free agent by the New Orleans Saints on July 27, 2011. He was waived/injured on August 30, 2011.

=== Indianapolis Colts ===
Fayson was signed to the practice squad of the Indianapolis Colts on November 22, 2011.

=== New England Patriots ===
Fayson was signed to the practice squad of the New England Patriots on November 1, 2012.

=== New Orleans Saints ===
Fayson was signed to a reserve/future contract with the New Orleans Saints on January 2, 2013. On August 19, 2013, he was waived by the Saints.

=== Toronto Argonauts ===
On October 9, 2013, Fayson was signed by the Toronto Argonauts of the Canadian Football League to a practice roster agreement. He was released by the Argonauts on November 11, 2014. On January 7, 2015, Fayson re-signed with the Argonauts.
