= Floyd Dean =

American football player (1940–2003)

No. 50, 57
- Position: Linebacker

Personal information
- Born: August 19, 1940; Luverne, Alabama, U.S.
- Died: July 15, 2003 (aged 62)
- Listed height: 6 ft 4 in (1.93 m)
- Listed weight: 236 lb (107 kg)

Career information
- High school: Eagle Lake (FL)
- College: Florida
- NFL draft: 1962: 4th round, 50th overall pick
- AFL draft: 1962: 15th round, 113th overall pick

Career history
- San Francisco 49ers (1964–1965)

Career NFL statistics
- Games played: 15
- Games started: 5
- Stats at Pro Football Reference

Thomas Floyd Dean (August 19, 1940 – July 15, 2003) was an American football linebacker who played for the San Francisco 49ers of the National Football League. He was drafted in the 4th round of the 1962 NFL draft, 50th overall.

== College career ==
Dean played for the University of Florida. He started his college career as a tackle but was converted to end. He signed with the 49ers in December 1962, after his senior year ended.

== Career statistics ==
Year	Team	Games		Sacks	Interceptions			Fumbles			
Year	Team	GP	GS	Sacks	Int	Yds	TD	FF	FR	Yds	TD
1964	SFO	6	0	—	0	0	0	—	0	0	0
1965	SFO	9	0	—	0	0	0	—	0	0	0
Career		15	0	—	0	0	0	—	0	0	0
