= Lewis Ezra Hicks =

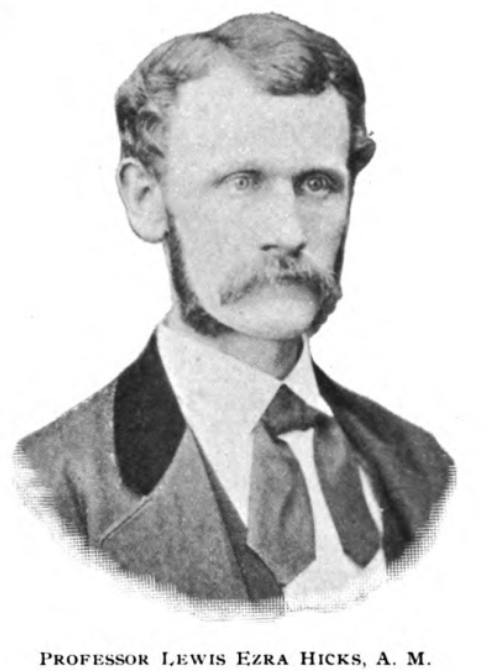
- Born: March 10, 1839
- Died: November 17, 1921 (aged 82)
- Occupations: Geologist, zoologist

Lewis Ezra Hicks (March 10, 1839 – November 17, 1921) was an American geologist, zoologist and college administrator.

== Career ==
Hicks was born in Kalida, Ohio, to Ezra and Julia (Lincoln) Hicks. During the American Civil War he was Lieutenant Colonel in the 69th Ohio Infantry. He was educated at Denison University and graduated with an A. B. in 1868. He attended Harvard University where he pursued work in geology and zoology. He was a student of Louis Agassiz. He was Professor of Natural Science at Denison University (1870-1884) and professor of geology at University of Nebraska (1884-1891). He was a fellow and member of the American Association for the Advancement of Science and a founding member of the Geological Society of America.

He was an editor for the journal American Geologist. In 1894, Hicks was appointed a missionary for the American Baptist Foreign Mission Society. Similar to Asa Gray, he believed that Darwin's theory of evolution and theism were compatible.

From 1905 to 1911 he was president of Rangoon Baptist College in Burma. He died in Georgia, November 17, 1921.

== Critique of design arguments ==
Hicks wrote a criticism of intelligent design arguments in 1883. Professor of Science Bruce H. Weber has noted that Hicks "warned of the ambiguity of conflating design seen as created contrivances with intent or purpose resulting from the action of natural law. He saw defenders of design logically and unjustifiably gliding from the first usage to the second in many of their arguments. For this reason alone, he thought design arguments should be banished."

== Publications ==
- A Critique of Design-Arguments (1883)

== See also ==
- Eutaxiology
