= Drew Miller (offensive lineman) =

American football player (born 1985)

No. 67
- Position: Center / Guard

Personal information
- Born: July 6, 1985 (age 41); Paducah, Kentucky, U.S.
- Listed height: 6 ft 5 in (1.96 m)
- Listed weight: 310 lb (141 kg)

Career information
- High school: Sarasota (FL) Riverview
- College: Florida
- NFL draft: 2008: undrafted

Career history
- Jacksonville Jaguars (2008); St. Louis Rams (2009–2011); Orlando Predators (2012); Omaha Nighthawks (2012)

Awards and highlights
- BCS national champion (2007); Second-team All-SEC (2006)

Career NFL statistics
- Games played: 1
- Stats at Pro Football Reference

Drew Miller (born July 6, 1985) is an American former professional football player who was center in the National Football League (NFL). He played college football for the Florida Gators. He was signed by the NFL's Jacksonville Jaguars as an undrafted free agent in 2008, and also played for the St. Louis Rams.

== Early life ==
Miller was born in Paducah, Kentucky, in 1985. He attended Riverview High School in Sarasota, Florida, where he played high school football for the Riverview Rams.

== College career ==
Miller received an athletic scholarship to attend the University of Florida in Gainesville, Florida, and played for coach Ron Zook and coach Urban Meyer's Gators teams from 2004 to 2007. He was a second-team All-Southeastern Conference (SEC) selection in 2006 and an honorable mention All-SEC pick in 2007. In 2006, Miller started fourteen consecutive games on the offensive line and the Gators posted a 12–1 record and won the BCS National Championship by defeating the Ohio State Buckeyes 41–14. Miller graduated from Florida with a bachelor's degree in anthropology in 2008.

== Professional career ==
=== Jacksonville Jaguars ===
Miller was signed by the Jacksonville Jaguars as an undrafted free agent in 2008, and he was a member of the Jaguars for a single season.

=== St. Louis Rams ===
In 2009 and 2010, he played for the St. Louis Rams, finishing 2010 on the practice squad. He made his debut with the Rams in 2011, but was waived on September 13.
