= 2011 Washington Redskins season =

NFL team season

- Owner: Daniel Snyder
- General manager: Bruce Allen
- Head coach: Mike Shanahan
- Offensive coordinator: Kyle Shanahan
- Defensive coordinator: Jim Haslett
- Home stadium: FedExField

Results
- Record: 5–11
- Division place: 4th NFC East
- Playoffs: Did not qualify
- All-Pros: LB London Fletcher (2nd team)
- Pro Bowlers: LB London Fletcher

The 2011 season was the Washington Redskins' 80th in the National Football League (NFL) and their 75th representing the District of Columbia (Washington, D.C.). Their home games were played at FedExField in Landover, Maryland for the 15th consecutive year. The Redskins failed to improve on their 2010 record of 6–10, meaning they finished last in the NFC East, but did manage to sweep the eventual Super Bowl champion New York Giants in the regular season, becoming only the sixth team to do so (the 1969 Oakland Raiders, 1983 Seattle Seahawks, 1995 Washington Redskins, 2002 New Orleans Saints, and 2007 Dallas Cowboys, also against the Giants, being the others). They would be joined by the 2020 New Orleans Saints and the 2021 San Francisco 49ers.

The season is also notable for being the first of three Redskins seasons to include four future head coaches on the coaching staff: Kyle Shanahan, Matt LaFleur, Sean McVay and Mike McDaniel.

== Offseason ==
=== 2011 NFL draft ===
The Redskins finished the 2010 season with a record of 6–10 and will be picking 6th overall.

Washington Redskins 2011 NFL draft selections
Draft order			Player name	Position	Height	Weight	College	Contract	Notes
Round	Choice	Overall	Player name	Position	Height	Weight	College	Contract	Notes
1	10	10	Traded to the Jacksonville Jaguars						
1	16	16	Ryan Kerrigan	Defensive end	6'3"	267	Purdue		
2	9	41	Jarvis Jenkins	Defensive tackle	6'4"	310	Clemson		
2	17	49	Traded to the Indianapolis Colts						
3	8	72	Traded to the New Orleans Saints						
3	15	79	Leonard Hankerson	Wide receiver	6'2"	209	Miami (Fl)		
4	7	104	Traded to the Philadelphia Eagles						
4	8	105	Roy Helu	Running back	6'0"	220	Nebraska		
5	13	144	Traded to the Houston Texans						
5	15	146	DeJon Gomes	Safety	5'11"	208	Nebraska		
5	21	152	Traded to the Houston Texans						
5	24	155	Niles Paul	Wide receiver	6'1"	224	Nebraska		
6	12	177	Evan Royster	Running back	6'1"	212	Penn State		
6	13	178	Aldrick Robinson	Wide receiver	5'10"	176	Southern Methodist		
7	10	213	Brandyn Thompson	Cornerback	5'10"	188	Boise State		
7	14	217	Maurice Hurt	Offensive tackle	6'3"	318	Florida		
7	21	224	Markus White	Defensive end	6'4"	266	Florida State		
7	50	253	Chris Neild	Defensive tackle	6'2"	319	West Virginia		

==== Transactions involving 2011 draft picks ====
- The Redskins traded their first-round selection (#10 overall) to the Jacksonville Jaguars for its first-round selection (#16 overall) and a second-round selection (#49 overall).
- The Redskins traded their third-round selection (#72 overall) and a 2012 conditional sixth-round selection to the New Orleans Saints in exchange for T Jammal Brown and a fifth-round selection (#155 overall).
- The Redskins traded their fourth-round selection (#104 overall) and a 2010 second-round selection to the Philadelphia Eagles in exchange for QB Donovan McNabb.
- The Redskins acquired a seventh-round selection in a trade that sent CB Justin Tryon to the Indianapolis Colts.
- The Redskins received a seventh-round compensatory pick.

== Staff ==
Washington Redskins 2011 staff
Front office: Owner – Daniel Snyder; General manager – Bruce Allen; Executive vice president – Mike Shanahan; Vice president of football administration – Eric Schaffer; Director of player personnel – Scott Campbell; Director of pro personnel – Morocco Brown; Head coaches: Head coach – Mike Shanahan; Assistant head coach/running backs – Bobby Turner; Offensive coaches: Offensive coordinator – Kyle Shanahan; Quarterbacks – Matt LaFleur; Wide receivers – Keenan McCardell; Tight ends – Sean McVay; Offensive line – Chris Foerster; Assistant offensive line – Chris Morgan; Offensive assistant – Mike McDaniel; Offensive coaching assistant – Richmond Flowers III	Defensive coaches: Defensive coordinator – Jim Haslett; Defensive line – Jacob Burney; Linebackers – Lou Spanos; Defensive backs – Bob Slowik; Safeties – Steve Jackson; Defensive assistant – Bobby Slowik; Special teams coaches: Special teams coordinator – Danny Smith; Assistant special teams – Richard Hightower; Strength and conditioning: Head strength and conditioning – Ray Wright; Assistant strength and conditioning – Chad Englehart

== Final roster ==
2011 Washington Redskins roster
Quarterbacks (QB): 12 John Beck; 8 Rex Grossman; Running backs (RB): 29 Roy Helu; 35 Evan Royster; 45 Mike Sellers FB; 36 Darrel Young FB; Wide receivers (WR): 88 David Anderson; 13 Anthony Armstrong; 18 Terrence Austin; 16 Brandon Banks; 10 Jabar Gaffney; 89 Santana Moss; 19 Donté Stallworth; 11 Aldrick Robinson; Tight ends (TE): 87 Rob Myers; 84 Niles Paul; 82 Logan Paulsen; 80 Richard Quinn	Offensive linemen (OL): 77 Jammal Brown T/G; 66 Chris Chester G; 58 Erik Cook C; 79 Maurice Hurt G; 75 Sean Locklear T; 63 Will Montgomery C/G; 74 Tyler Polumbus T; 69 Willie Smith T; Defensive linemen (DL): 93 Kentwan Balmer DE; 72 Stephen Bowen DE; 94 Adam Carriker DE; 96 Barry Cofield NT; 95 Chris Neild NT; 76 Darrion Scott DE; 90 Doug Worthington DE	Linebackers (LB): 97 Lorenzo Alexander OLB; 59 London Fletcher ILB; 51 Keyaron Fox ILB; 50 Rob Jackson OLB; 91 Ryan Kerrigan OLB; 52 Rocky McIntosh ILB; 98 Brian Orakpo OLB; 56 Perry Riley ILB; 55 Markus White OLB; Defensive backs (DB): 20 Oshiomogho Atogwe FS; 22 Kevin Barnes CB; 37 Reed Doughty SS; 24 DeJon Gomes FS; 23 DeAngelo Hall CB; 32 Brandyn Thompson CB; 34 Byron Westbrook CB; 26 Josh Wilson CB; Special teams (ST): 4 Graham Gano K; 6 Sav Rocca P; 57 Nick Sundberg LS	Practice squad: 40 Travon Bellamy S; 3 Jonathan Crompton QB; 38 Tristan Davis RB; 39 Michael Hamlin S; 41 Stafon Johnson RB; 73 Eric Olsen C/G; 86 Schuylar Oordt TE; 70 Cole Pemberton T; Reserve: 92 Chris Baker NT (IR); 31 Phillip Buchanon CB (IR); 47 Chris Cooley TE (IR); 83 Fred Davis TE (Susp.); 64 Kedric Golston DE (IR); 85 Leonard Hankerson WR (IR); 25 Tim Hightower RB (IR); 99 Jarvis Jenkins DE (IR); 30 LaRon Landry SS (IR); 78 Kory Lichtensteiger G (IR); 71 Trent Williams T (Susp.); Rookies in italics 53 active, 11 reserve, 8 practice squad

== Preseason ==
=== Schedule ===
The Redskins' preseason schedule was announced on April 12, 2011. It was finalized on April 19, 2011.

Week	Date	Opponent	Result	Record	Venue	Recap
1	August 12	Pittsburgh Steelers	W 16–7	1–0	FedExField	Recap
2	August 19	at Indianapolis Colts	W 16–3	2–0	Lucas Oil Stadium	Recap
3	August 25	at Baltimore Ravens	L 31–34	2–1	M&T Bank Stadium	Recap
4	September 1	Tampa Bay Buccaneers	W 29–24	3–1	FedExField	Recap

== Regular season ==
=== Schedule ===
Week	Date	Opponent	Result	Record	Venue	Recap
1	September 11	New York Giants	W 28–14	1–0	FedExField	Recap
2	September 18	Arizona Cardinals	W 22–21	2–0	FedExField	Recap
3	September 26	at Dallas Cowboys	L 16–18	2–1	Cowboys Stadium	Recap
4	October 2	at St. Louis Rams	W 17–10	3–1	Edward Jones Dome	Recap
5	Bye					
6	October 16	Philadelphia Eagles	L 13–20	3–2	FedExField	Recap
7	October 23	at Carolina Panthers	L 20–33	3–3	Bank of America Stadium	Recap
8	October 30	at Buffalo Bills	L 0–23	3–4	(Canada) Rogers Centre (Toronto)	Recap
9	November 6	San Francisco 49ers	L 11–19	3–5	FedExField	Recap
10	November 13	at Miami Dolphins	L 9–20	3–6	Sun Life Stadium	Recap
11	November 20	Dallas Cowboys	L 24–27 (OT)	3–7	FedExField	Recap
12	November 27	at Seattle Seahawks	W 23–17	4–7	CenturyLink Field	Recap
13	December 4	New York Jets	L 19–34	4–8	FedExField	Recap
14	December 11	New England Patriots	L 27–34	4–9	FedExField	Recap
15	December 18	at New York Giants	W 23–10	5–9	MetLife Stadium	Recap
16	December 24	Minnesota Vikings	L 26–33	5–10	FedExField	Recap
17	January 1, 2012	at Philadelphia Eagles	L 10–34	5–11	Lincoln Financial Field	Recap

=== Game summaries ===
==== Week 1: vs. New York Giants ====
Week One: New York Giants at Washington Redskins – Game summary

Quarter	1	2	3	4	Total
Giants	7	7	0	0	14
Redskins	0	14	7	7	28

at FedExField, Landover, Maryland

- Date: September 11
- Game time: 4:15 p.m. EDT
- Game weather: 87° F (Sunny)
- Game attendance: 80,121
- Referee: Ron Winter
- TV announcers (Fox): Joe Buck, Troy Aikman and Pam Oliver

Game information

First quarter

- NYG Eli Manning 2-yard run (Lawrence Tynes kick) (4 plays, 70 yards, 0:35) (Giants 7-0)

Second quarter

- WAS Tim Hightower 1-yard run (Graham Gano kick) (11 plays, 66 yards, 5:32) (Tied 7-7)
- NYG Bradshaw 6-yard run (Lawrence Tynes kick) (8 plays, 85 yards, 4:44) (Giants 14-7)
- WAS Anthony Armstrong 6-yard pass from Rex Grossman (Graham Gano kick) (5 plays 80 yards, 2:11) (Tied 14-14)

Third quarter

- WAS Ryan Kerrigan 9-yard interception return (Graham Gano kick) (Redskins 21-14)

Fourth quarter

- WAS Jabar Gaffney 4-yard pass from Rex Grossman (Graham Gano kick) (10 plays, 70 yards, 5:53) (Redskins 28-14)

Top passers

- NYG – Eli Manning – 18/32, 391 YDS, 0 TD, INT
- WAS – Rex Grossman – 21/34, 305 YDS, 2 TD, 0 INT

Top rushers

- NYG – Ahmad Bradshaw – 13 CAR, 44 YDS, TD
- WAS – Tim Hightower – 25 CAR, 72 YDS, TD

Top receivers

- NYG – Hakeem Nicks – 7 REC, 122 YDS
- WAS – Fred Davis – 5 REC, 105 YDS

Top tacklers

- NYG – Kenny Phillips – 5 TKL, 4 AST
- WAS – Reed Doughty – 8 TKL, 2 AST

The Redskins opened the 2011 season at home against their division rival the New York Giants, on the tenth anniversary of the September 11 attacks on New York City and Washington D.C.

With the win, the Redskins started their season at 1–0.

==== Week 2: vs. Arizona Cardinals ====
Week Two: Arizona Cardinals at Washington Redskins – Game summary

Quarter	1	2	3	4	Total
Cardinals	7	0	7	7	21
Redskins	0	10	0	12	22

at FedExField, Landover, Maryland

- Date: September 18
- Game time: 1:00 p.m. EDT
- Game weather: 66 °F (19 °C) (Cloudy)
- Game attendance: 76,330
- Referee: Pete Morelli
- TV announcers (Fox): Chris Myers and Tim Ryan

Game information

First quarter

Second quarter

Third quarter

Fourth quarter

Top passers

- ARI –
- WAS –

Top rushers

- ARI –
- WAS –

Top receivers

- ARI –
- WAS –

Top tacklers

- ARI –
- WAS –

With the win, the Redskins improved to 2–0. This would be the last time the team would win a game at home until hosting the Minnesota Vikings during the middle of the 2012 season.

==== Week 3: at Dallas Cowboys ====
Week Three: Washington Redskins at Dallas Cowboys – Game summary

Quarter	1	2	3	4	Total
Redskins	6	3	7	0	16
Cowboys	3	6	3	6	18

at Cowboys Stadium, Arlington, Texas

- Date: September 26
- Game time: 8:30 p.m. EDT/7:30 p.m. CDT
- Game weather: 90 °F (32 °C) (retractable roof open)
- Game attendance: 91,017
- Referee: Ed Hochuli
- TV announcers (ESPN): Mike Tirico, Ron Jaworski, Jon Gruden and Ed Werder

Game information

First quarter

- WAS – Graham Gano 46-yard field goal, Redskins 3–0, Drive: 10 plays, 42 yards, 4:54.
- DAL – Dan Bailey 41-yard field goal, Tied 3–3, Drive: 9 plays, 57 yards, 4:32.
- WAS – Graham Gano 46-yard field goal, Redskins 6–3, Drive: 3 plays, 1 yard, 1:36.

Second quarter

- DAL – Dan Bailey 27-yard field goal, Tied 6–6, Drive: 4 plays, 9 yards, 1:52.
- DAL – Dan Bailey 32-yard field goal, Cowboys 9–6, Drive: 8 plays, 54 yards, 3:57.
- WAS – Graham Gano 50-yard field goal, Tied 9–9, Drive: 10 plays, 48 yards, 2:25.

Third quarter

- WAS – Tim Hightower 1-yard pass from Rex Grossman (Graham Gano kick), Redskins 16–9, Drive: 9 plays, 76 yards, 5:31.
- DAL – Dan Bailey 41-yard field goal, Redskins 16–12, Drive: 7 plays, 57 yards, 3:41.

Fourth quarter

- DAL – Dan Bailey 23-yard field goal, Redskins 16–15, Drive: 9 plays, 76 yards, 4:28.
- DAL – Dan Bailey 40-yard field goal, Cowboys 18–16, Drive: 9 plays, 64 yards, 1:57.

Top passers

- WAS – Rex Grossman – 22/37, 250 yards, 1 touchdown, 1 interception
- DAL – Tony Romo – 22/36, 255 yards, 0 touchdowns, 1 interception

Top rushers

- WAS – Tim Hightower – 14 rushes, 41 yards
- DAL – Felix Jones – 14 rushes, 115 yards

Top receivers

- WAS – Santana Moss – 5 receptions, 70 yards
- DAL – Dez Bryant – 4 receptions, 63 yards

Top tacklers

- WAS – O.J. Atogwe, DeAngelo Hall – 6 tackles
- DAL – Gerald Sensabaugh – 6 tackles, 1 assist

Coming off their home win over the Cardinals, the Redskins flew to Cowboys Stadium for a Week 3 NFC East duel with the Dallas Cowboys on Monday night. Washington threw the game's opening punch in the first quarter with a 46-yard field goal from kicker Graham Gano. The Cowboys answered with kicker Dan Bailey getting a 41-yard field goal, while the Redskins replied with Gano's 27-yard field goal. Dallas would take the lead in the second quarter as Bailey made a 27-yard and a 32-yard field goal, yet the Redskins closed out the half with Gano's 50-yard field goal.

Washington began the third quarter with quarterback Rex Grossman finding running back Tim Hightower on a 1-yard touchdown pass. The Cowboys would end the third quarter with Bailey making a 41-yard field goal. Dallas regained the lead in the fourth quarter with Bailey booting a 23-yard and a 40-yard field goal. The 'Skins tried to rally, but the Cowboys' defense held on to preserve the win.

With the loss, the Redskins fell to 2–1.

==== Week 4: at St. Louis Rams ====
Week Four: Washington Redskins at St. Louis Rams – Game summary

Quarter	1	2	3	4	Total
Redskins	7	7	3	0	17
Rams	0	0	0	10	10

at Edward Jones Dome, St. Louis, Missouri

- Date: October 2
- Game time: 1:00 p.m. EDT/12:00 p.m. CDT
- Game weather: Played indoors (dome stadium)
- Game attendance: 56,113
- Referee: Walt Coleman
- TV announcers (Fox): Chris Myers & Tim Ryan

Game information

First quarter

Second quarter

Third quarter

Fourth quarter

Top passers

- WAS –
- STL –

Top rushers

- WAS –
- STL –

Top receivers

- WAS –
- STL –

Top tacklers

- WAS –
- STL –

With the win, the Redskins went into their bye week at 3–1.

==== Week 6: vs. Philadelphia Eagles ====
Week Six: Philadelphia Eagles at Washington Redskins – Game summary

Quarter	1	2	3	4	Total
Eagles	7	13	0	0	20
Redskins	0	3	3	7	13

at FedExField, Landover, Maryland

- Date: October 16
- Game time: 1:00 p.m. EDT
- Game weather: 68 °F (20 °C) (Sunny)
- Game attendance: 80,447
- Referee: Bill Leavy
- TV announcers (Fox): Sam Rosen, Brian Billick and Laura Okmin

Game information

First quarter

Second quarter

Third quarter

Fourth quarter

Top passers

- PHI – Michael Vick
- WAS – Rex Grossman

Top rushers

- PHI – Lesean McCoy
- WAS – Ryan Torain

Top receivers

- PHI – Jeremy Maclin
- WAS – Fred Davis

Top tacklers

- PHI – Kurt Coleman
- WAS – London Fletcher

With the loss, the Redskins fell to 3–2.

==== Week 7: at Carolina Panthers ====
Week Seven: Washington Redskins at Carolina Panthers – Game summary

Quarter	1	2	3	4	Total
Redskins	0	6	7	7	20
Panthers	3	6	14	10	33

at Bank of America Stadium, Charlotte, North Carolina

- Date: October 23
- Game time: 1:00 p.m. EDT
- Game weather: 62 °F (17 °C) (Sunny)
- Game attendance: 73,245
- Referee: Jerome Boger
- TV announcers (Fox): Chris Myers and Tim Ryan

Game information

First quarter

Second quarter

Third quarter

Fourth quarter

Top passers

- WAS –
- CAR –

Top rushers

- WAS –
- CAR –

Top receivers

- WAS –
- CAR –

Top tacklers

- WAS –
- CAR –

With the loss, the Redskins fell to 3–3.

==== Week 8: at Buffalo Bills ====
Bills Toronto Series

Week Eight: Washington Redskins at Buffalo Bills – Game summary

Quarter	1	2	3	4	Total
Redskins	0	0	0	0	0
Bills	7	6	7	3	23

at Rogers Centre, Toronto, Ontario, Canada

- Date: October 30
- Game time: 4:05 p.m. EDT
- Game weather: Played indoors (dome stadium)
- Game attendance: 51,579
- Referee: Terry McAulay
- TV announcers (Fox): Thom Brennaman, Troy Aikman, & Pam Oliver

Game information

First quarter

Second quarter

Third quarter

Fourth quarter

Top passers

- WAS –
- BUF –

Top rushers

- WAS –
- BUF –

Top receivers

- WAS –
- BUF –

Top tacklers

- WAS –
- BUF –

With the loss, the Redskins fell to 3–4.

==== Week 9: vs. San Francisco 49ers ====
Week Nine: San Francisco 49ers at Washington Redskins – Game summary

Quarter	1	2	3	4	Total
49ers	0	13	3	3	19
Redskins	0	3	0	8	11

at FedExField, Landover, Maryland

- Date: November 6
- Game time: 1:00 p.m. EST
- Game weather: 56 °F (13 °C) (Sunny)
- Game attendance: 78,032
- Referee: Gene Steratore
- TV announcers (Fox): Kenny Albert, Daryl Johnston, & Tony Siragusa

Game information

First quarter

- No scoring plays

Second quarter

- David Akers 52-yard Field Goal SF 3–0 12:43
- David Akers 34-yard Field Goal SF 6–0 1:50
- Bruce Miller 30-yard pass from Alex Smith (David Akers kick) SF 13–0 1:03
- Graham Gano 59-yard Field Goal SF 13–3 00:00

Third quarter

- David Akers 45-yard Field Goal SF 16–3 4:23

Fourth quarter

- David Akers 20-yard Field Goal SF 19–3 7:41
- Jabar Gaffney 9-yard pass from John Beck (John Beck pass to Leonard Hankerson) SF 19–11 1:10

Top passers

- SF – Alex Smith 17–24 for 200 yards 1 touchdown 0 interceptions
- WAS – John Beck 30–47 for 254 yards 1 touchdown 1 interception

Top rushers

- SF – Frank Gore 19 carries for 107 yards 0 touchdowns
- WAS – Roy Helu 10 carries for 41 yards 0 touchdowns

Top receivers

- SF – Michael Crabtree 5 receptions for 51 yards 0 touchdowns
- WAS – Roy Helu 14 receptions for 105 yards 0 touchdowns

Top tacklers

- SF – Patrick Willis 13 tackles 9 solo
- WAS – DeAngelo Hall 12 tackles 6 solo

Although the Redskins lost and fell to 3–5, it was during this game that kicker Graham Gano made a 59-yard field goal, which set an all time Washington Redskin franchise record.

==== Week 10: at Miami Dolphins ====
Week Ten: Washington Redskins at Miami Dolphins – Game summary

Quarter	1	2	3	4	Total
Redskins	3	3	3	0	9
Dolphins	7	3	3	7	20

at Sun Life Stadium, Miami Gardens, Florida

- Date: November 13
- Game time: 1:00 p.m. EST
- Game weather: 79 °F (26 °C) (Mostly Cloudy)
- Game attendance: 57,007
- Referee: Carl Cheffers
- TV announcers (Fox): Chris Myers & Tim Ryan

Game information

First quarter

Second quarter

Third quarter

Fourth quarter

Top passers

- WAS –
- MIA –

Top rushers

- WAS –
- MIA –

Top receivers

- WAS –
- MIA –

Top tacklers

- WAS –
- MIA –

With the loss, the Redskins fell to 3–6.

==== Week 11: vs. Dallas Cowboys ====
Week Eleven: Dallas Cowboys at Washington Redskins – Game summary

Quarter	1	2	3	4	OT	Total
Cowboys	7	3	0	14	3	27
Redskins	0	14	3	7	0	24

at FedExField, Landover, Maryland

- Date: November 20
- Game time: 1:00 p.m. EST
- Game weather: 60 °F (16 °C) (Cloudy)
- Game attendance: 80,122
- Referee: Ed Hochuli
- TV announcers (Fox): Kenny Albert, Daryl Johnston and Tony Siragusa

Game information

First quarter

Second quarter

Third quarter

Fourth quarter

Top passers

- DAL –
- WAS –

Top rushers

- DAL –
- WAS –

Top receivers

- DAL –
- WAS –

Top tacklers

- DAL –
- WAS –

With the loss, the Redskins fell to 3–7.

==== Week 12: at Seattle Seahawks ====
Week Twelve: Washington Redskins at Seattle Seahawks – Game summary

Quarter	1	2	3	4	Total
Redskins	7	0	0	16	23
Seahawks	0	7	3	7	17

at CenturyLink Field, Seattle, Washington

- Date: November 27
- Game time: 4:05 p.m. EST/1:05 p.m. PST
- Game weather: 52 °F (11 °C) (Rain)
- Game attendance: 66,007
- Referee: Clete Blakeman
- TV announcers (Fox): Ron Pitts, Jim Mora, Jr. and Drea Avent

Game information

First quarter

Second quarter

Third quarter

Fourth quarter

Top passers

- WAS –
- SEA –

Top rushers

- WAS –
- SEA –

Top receivers

- WAS –
- SEA –

Top tacklers

- WAS –
- SEA –

With the win, the Redskins improved to 4–7 and snapped their 6-game losing streak.

==== Week 13: vs. New York Jets ====
Week Thirteen: New York Jets at Washington Redskins – Game summary

Quarter	1	2	3	4	Total
Jets	7	3	3	21	34
Redskins	7	6	0	6	19

at FedExField, Landover, Maryland

- Date: December 4
- Game time: 1:00 p.m. EST
- Game weather: 53 °F (12 °C) (Sunny)
- Game attendance: 74,121
- Referee: John Parry
- TV announcers (CBS): Ian Eagle and Dan Fouts

Game information

First quarter

Second quarter

Third quarter

Fourth quarter

Top passers

- NYJ –
- WAS –

Top rushers

- NYJ –
- WAS –

Top receivers

- NYJ –
- WAS –

Top tacklers

- NYJ –
- WAS –

With the loss, the Redskins fell to 4–8.

==== Week 14: vs. New England Patriots ====
Week Fourteen: New England Patriots at Washington Redskins – Game summary

Quarter	1	2	3	4	Total
Patriots	14	6	14	0	34
Redskins	10	10	7	0	27

at FedExField, Landover, Maryland

- Date: December 11
- Game time: 1:00 p.m. EST
- Game weather: 40 °F (4 °C) (Sunny)
- Game attendance: 77,825
- Referee: Jeff Triplette
- TV announcers (CBS): Greg Gumbel and Dan Dierdorf

Game information

First quarter

Second quarter

Third quarter

Fourth quarter

Top passers

- NE –
- WAS –

Top rushers

- NE –
- WAS –

Top receivers

- NE –
- WAS –

Top tacklers

- NE –
- WAS –

With the loss, the Redskins fell to 4–9 and were officially eliminated from playoff contention.

==== Week 15: at New York Giants ====
Week Fifteen: Washington Redskins at New York Giants – Game summary

Quarter	1	2	3	4	Total
Redskins	3	14	3	3	23
Giants	0	3	0	7	10

at MetLife Stadium, East Rutherford, New Jersey

- Date: December 18
- Game time: 1:00 p.m. EST
- Game weather: 29 °F (−2 °C) (Sunny)
- Game attendance: 78,861
- Referee: Alberto Riveron
- TV announcers (Fox): Joe Buck, Troy Aikman and Pam Oliver

Game information

First quarter

Second quarter

Third quarter

Fourth quarter

Top passers

- WAS –
- NYG –

Top rushers

- WAS –
- NYG –

Top receivers

- WAS –
- NYG –

Top tacklers

- WAS –
- NYG –

With the win, the Redskins improved to 5–9 and swept the Giants for the first time since 1999. They would not do so again until 2021 as the Washington Football Team.

==== Week 16: vs. Minnesota Vikings ====
Week Sixteen: Minnesota Vikings at Washington Redskins – Game summary

Quarter	1	2	3	4	Total
Vikings	3	7	13	10	33
Redskins	0	10	10	6	26

at FedExField, Landover, Maryland

- Date: December 24
- Game time: 1:00 p.m. EST
- Game weather: 45 °F (7 °C) (Sunny)
- Game attendance: 68,370
- Referee: Tony Corrente
- TV announcers (Fox): Chris Myers, Tim Ryan and Jaime Maggio

Game information

First quarter

Second quarter

Third quarter

Fourth quarter

Top passers

- MIN –
- WAS –

Top rushers

- MIN –
- WAS –

Top receivers

- MIN –
- WAS –

Top tacklers

- MIN –
- WAS –

With the loss, the Redskins fell to 5–10.

==== Week 17: at Philadelphia Eagles ====
Week Seventeen: Washington Redskins at Philadelphia Eagles – Game summary

Quarter	1	2	3	4	Total
Redskins	0	0	7	3	10
Eagles	3	7	3	21	34

at Lincoln Financial Field, Philadelphia, Pennsylvania

- Date: January 1
- Game time: 1:00 p.m. EST
- Game weather: 53 °F (12 °C) (Sunny)
- Game attendance: 69,144
- Referee: Carl Cheffers
- TV announcers (Fox): Ron Pitts, Charles Davis, & Drea Avent

Game information

First quarter

Second quarter

Third quarter

Fourth quarter

Top passers

- WAS –
- PHI –

Top rushers

- WAS –
- PHI –

Top receivers

- WAS –
- PHI –

Top tacklers

- WAS –
- PHI –

With the loss, the Redskins finished the season 5–11.

=== Standings ===
NFC East
	W	L	T	PCT	DIV	CONF	PF	PA	STK
^{(4)} New York Giants	9	7	0	.563	3–3	5–7	394	400	W2
Philadelphia Eagles	8	8	0	.500	5–1	6–6	396	328	W4
Dallas Cowboys	8	8	0	.500	2–4	6–6	369	347	L2
Washington Redskins	5	11	0	.313	2–4	5–7	288	367	L2
