= List of New Mexico Lobos in the NFL draft =

This is a List of New Mexico Lobos football players in the NFL draft.

== Key ==
B	Back	K	Kicker	NT	Nose tackle
C	Center	LB	Linebacker	FB	Fullback
DB	Defensive back	P	Punter	HB	Halfback
DE	Defensive end	QB	Quarterback	WR	Wide receiver
DT	Defensive tackle	RB	Running back	G	Guard
E	End	T	Offensive tackle	TE	Tight end

== Selections ==
Year	Round	Pick	Player	Team	Position
1939	7	51	Bill Dwyer	Chicago Cardinals	B
1939	18	167	Dutch Niemant	Detroit Lions	B
1945	27	283	Bill Thompson	Philadelphia Eagles	T
1946	13	113	George Poppin	Pittsburgh Steelers	T
1948	19	174	Rudy Krall	Philadelphia Eagles	B
1949	12	112	Virgil Boeler	Detroit Lions	C
1952	27	317	Chuck Hill	Philadelphia Eagles	B
1953	14	169	Jack Barger	Detroit Lions	T
1953	28	327	Mike Prokopiak	Chicago Cardinals	B
1955	12	145	Jack Eaton	Cleveland Browns	T
1955	17	194	Larry White	Chicago Cardinals	C
1958	29	341	Glen Hakes	Chicago Bears	G
1960	7	73	Ron Morrison	Los Angeles Rams	T
1960	9	106	Don Perkins	Baltimore Colts	B
1963	15	200	George Heard	Philadelphia Eagles	E
1964	15	205	Cliff Stallings	St. Louis Cardinals	B
1965	16	212	Dave Hettema	San Francisco 49ers	T
1966	11	162	Stan Quintana	Minnesota Vikings	DB
1967	12	309	Ben Monroe	Philadelphia Eagles	QB
1968	9	222	Paul Smith	Denver Broncos	LB
1968	12	316	Emilio Vallez	Chicago Bears	LB
1969	13	336	Rene Matison	Dallas Cowboys	WR
1970	11	282	David Bookert	Los Angeles Rams	RB
1971	3	69	Sam Scarber	Dallas Cowboys	RB
1971	10	259	Rodney Wallace	Dallas Cowboys	DT
1973	9	221	Larry Dibbles	Minnesota Vikings	DE
1973	17	427	Fred Henry	Los Angeles Rams	RB
1974	6	134	Don Woods	Green Bay Packers	RB
1976	4	93	Steve Myer	Seattle Seahawks	QB
1976	17	477	Bob Berg	Buffalo Bills	K
1977	1	21	Robin Cole	Pittsburgh Steelers	LB
1977	5	137	Andy Frederick	Dallas Cowboys	T
1977	7	180	Bruce Herron	Miami Dolphins	LB
1977	9	234	Dave Green	Kansas City Chiefs	T
1979	8	195	Mike Williams	Kansas City Chiefs	RB
1980	3	81	Charles Baker	St. Louis Cardinals	LB
1980	4	106	Chris Combs	Houston Oilers	TE
1981	4	96	Brad Wright	Miami Dolphins	QB
1981	5	127	Ricky Martin	Pittsburgh Steelers	WR
1981	12	316	Bob Shupryt	Chicago Bears	LB
1984	7	178	Jimmie Carter	Detroit Lions	LB
1984	7	192	Derwin Williams	New England Patriots	WR
1985	10	269	Buddy Funck	Denver Broncos	QB
1990	6	140	Terance Mathis	New York Jets	WR
1991	12	329	Ron Shipley	Kansas City Chiefs	G
1995	3	70	David Sloan	Detroit Lions	TE
1995	3	80	Stoney Case	Arizona Cardinals	QB
1996	3	73	Winslow Oliver	Carolina Panthers	RB
1996	6	173	Charles Griffin	New England Patriots	TE
1998	3	80	Ramos McDonald	Minnesota Vikings	DB
1998	6	156	Scott McGarrahan	Green Bay Packers	DB
2000	1	9	Brian Urlacher	Chicago Bears	LB
2000	7	226	Casey Tisdale	New England Patriots	LB
2001	6	194	Joe Maese	Baltimore Ravens	C
2002	5	136	Jarrod Baxter	Houston Texans	RB
2005	4	134	Claude Terrell	St. Louis Rams	G
2005	6	176	Nick Speegle	Cleveland Browns	LB
2006	2	51	Ryan Cook	Minnesota Vikings	C
2006	7	216	Terrance Pennington	Buffalo Bills	T
2007	3	68	Quincy Black	Tampa Bay Buccaneers	LB
2008	4	106	Marcus Smith	Baltimore Ravens	WR
2009	4	112	Glover Quin	Houston Texans	DB
2009	6	200	DeAndre Wright	New York Giants	DB
2010	7	229	Erik Cook	Washington Redskins	G
2018	7	229	Jason Sanders	Miami Dolphins	K
2023	6	198	Jerrick Reed II	Seattle Seahawks	DB
2026	7	252	Keyshawn James-Newby	Philadelphia Eagles	DE

== Notable undrafted players ==
Note: No drafts held before 1936

Debut year	Player name	Position	Debut NFL/AFL team	Notes
1946	Ben Agajanian	K	Philadelphia Eagles	—
1967	Bobby Morgan	DB	Pittsburgh Steelers	—
1973	Ken Smith	TE	Cleveland Browns	—
1976	Ken Brown	C	New Orleans Saints	—
1977	Randy Rich	DB	Detroit Lions	—
1978	Preston Dennard	WR	Los Angeles Rams	—
1980	Walt Arnold	TE	Los Angeles Rams	—
1981	Frank Giddens	T	Philadelphia Eagles	—
1987	Ron Keller	K	Dallas Cowboys	—
1987	Jon Sutton	DB	New Orleans Saints	—
1987	Willie Turral	RB	Philadelphia Eagles	—
1989	John Duff	TE	Dallas Cowboys	—
1994	Eric Jack	DB	Atlanta Falcons	—
1994	Ray Wilson	S	New Orleans Saints	—
1997	Donald Sellers	WR	St. Louis Rams	—
1998	Billy Austin	S	St. Louis Rams	—
1999	Lennox Gordon	RB	Buffalo Bills	—
1999	Graham Leigh	QB	Arizona Cardinals	—
2001	Walter Bernard	CB	San Diego Chargers	—
2004	Billy Strother	LB	Washington Redskins	—
2006	Hank Baskett	WR	Minnesota Vikings	—
2006	DonTrell Moore	RB	New York Jets	—
2007	Rob Turner	G/C	New York Jets	—
2008	Travis Brown	WR	Seattle Seahawks	—
2009	Rodney Ferguson	RB	Tennessee Titans	—
2016	Jhurell Pressley	RB	Minnesota Vikings	—
2017	Dakota Cox	LB	Minnesota Vikings	—
2018	Lamar Jordan	WR	Atlanta Falcons	—
2019	D'Angelo Ross	CB	New England Patriots	—
