= Cibola High School (New Mexico) =

High school in New Mexico, US

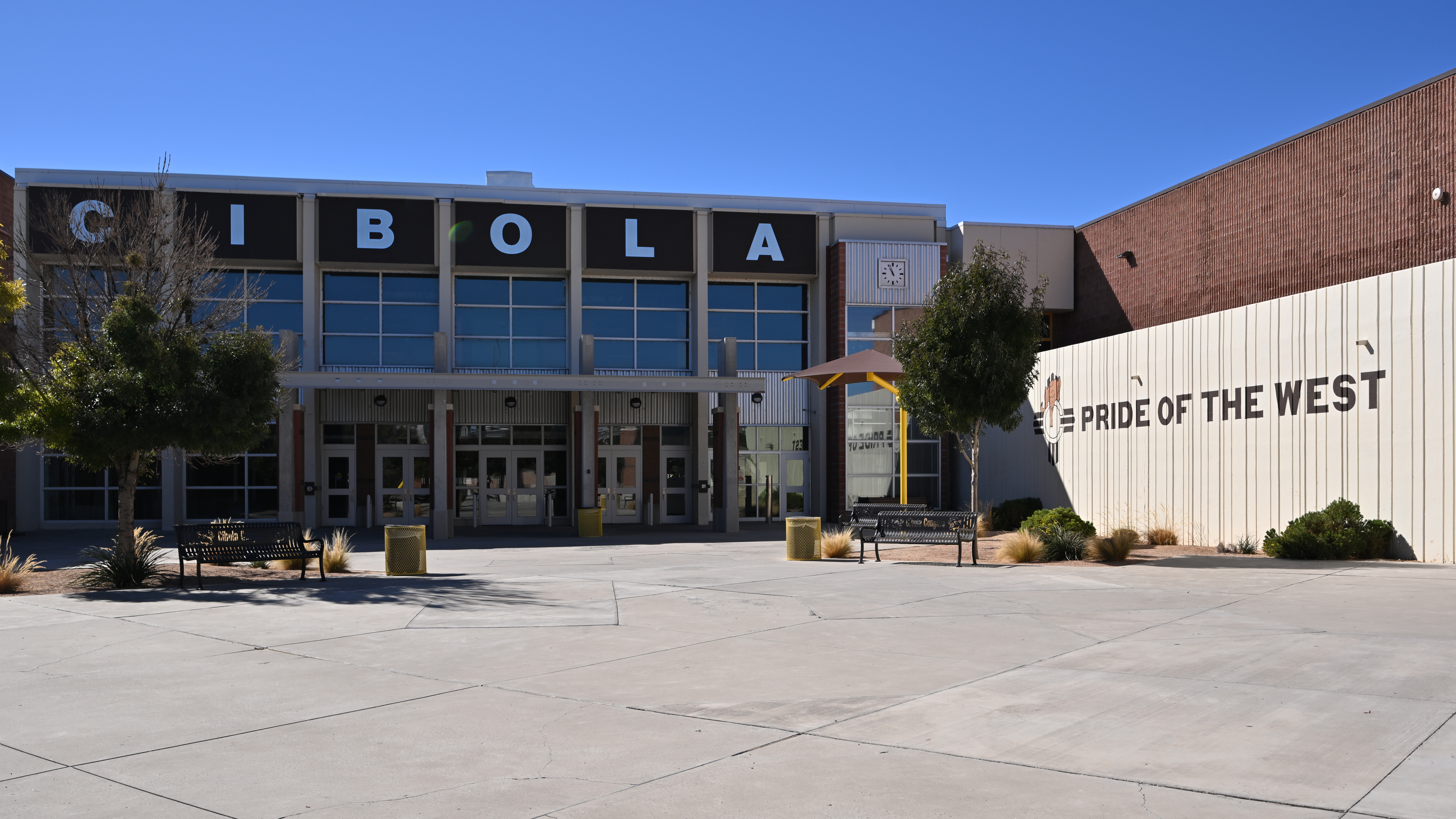

Location
- 1510 Ellison Dr. NW; Albuquerque, New Mexico 87114; United States; 35°12′17″N 106°39′48″W

Information
- Type: Public high school
- Established: 1974
- Principal: Kimberly Finke
- Staff: 92.00 (FTE)
- Enrollment: 1,622 (2023-2024)
- Student to teacher ratio: 17.63
- Campus: Suburban
- Colors: Gold, brown, and white
- Athletics conference: NMAA, 6A Dist. 1
- Mascot: Cougar
- Rival: Volcano Vista
- Website: cibola.aps.edu

Cibola High School (CHS) is a public senior high school located in northwest Albuquerque, New Mexico. It is part of the Albuquerque Public Schools District. Due to rapid population growth on the west side of Albuquerque, Cibola was the largest high school in the state of New Mexico until 2006, and was overcrowded with over 3,200 students and 62 portable classrooms. School enrollment was reduced in 2007 with the opening of a new high school on Albuquerque’s west side. Volcano Vista High School opened in the fall of 2007. The following year, in 2008, CHS underwent a massive remodel and expansion of the school. The current enrollment stands at 1,762.

== School grade ==
The NMPED (New Mexico Public Education department) replaced the No Child Left Behind Act and AYP testing with a new school grading formula, which took effect for the 2010-2011 school year. The grade is calculated using many forms of testing, and includes graduation rates.

School year	Grade from NMPED
2010–11	A

== Demographics ==
Ethnicity	This school	State average
White (not Hispanic)	58%	29%
Hispanic	33%	56%
American Indian/Alaskan Native	4%	11%
African American	2%	3%
Pacific Islander	3%	1%

== Athletics ==
Cibola competes in the New Mexico Activities Association (NMAA), as a class 6A school in District 1. In 2014, the NMAA realigned the state's schools in to six classifications and adjusted district boundaries. In addition to Cibola High School, the schools in District 1-6A include: V. Sue Cleveland High School, Volcano Vista High School, Rio Rancho High School and Santa Fe High School.

State championships
Season	Sport	Number of championships	Year
Fall	Volleyball	3	2014, 1981, 1974
Fall	Boys' cross country	2	2009, 2008
Fall	Girls' soccer	2	2016, 2015
Winter	Wrestling	1	1982
Winter	Boys' swimming and diving	1	2014
Spring	Baseball	1	1983
Spring	Softball	3	2009, 2008, 2007
Spring	Boys' golf	3	1994, 1991, 1990
Spring	Boys' track and field	2	2010, 2008
Spring	Girls' track and field	1	2003
Total		20	

== Notable alumni ==
- Alan Branch, NFL defensive lineman
- Raven Chacon, Pulitzer Prize winning composer
- Carlos Condit, mixed martial arts fighter competing in the UFC
- Erik Cook, NFL offensive lineman
- Ryan Cook, NFL offensive lineman
- Christian Cunningham (born 1997), basketball player in the Israeli Basketball Premier League
- Rosie Jones, professional golfer
- C. J. Maestas, former American artistic gymnast and member of the United States men's national artistic gymnastics team
- John Roskos, former Major League Baseball player (Florida Marlins, San Diego Padres)
- Gadi Schwartz, news correspondent
- Kevin A. Short, painter
- Melanie Stansbury, US House of Representatives (NM-1)
- Mike Vento, former Major League Baseball player (New York Yankees, Washington Nationals)
- Mikey Angelo, comedian, musician, and social media personality
- Xzibit, rapper, actor, and MTV host
- Lisandra Tena, actress
- Cole Christiansen, NFL linebacker
