= Willie Smith (offensive tackle, born 1986) =

American football player (born 1986)

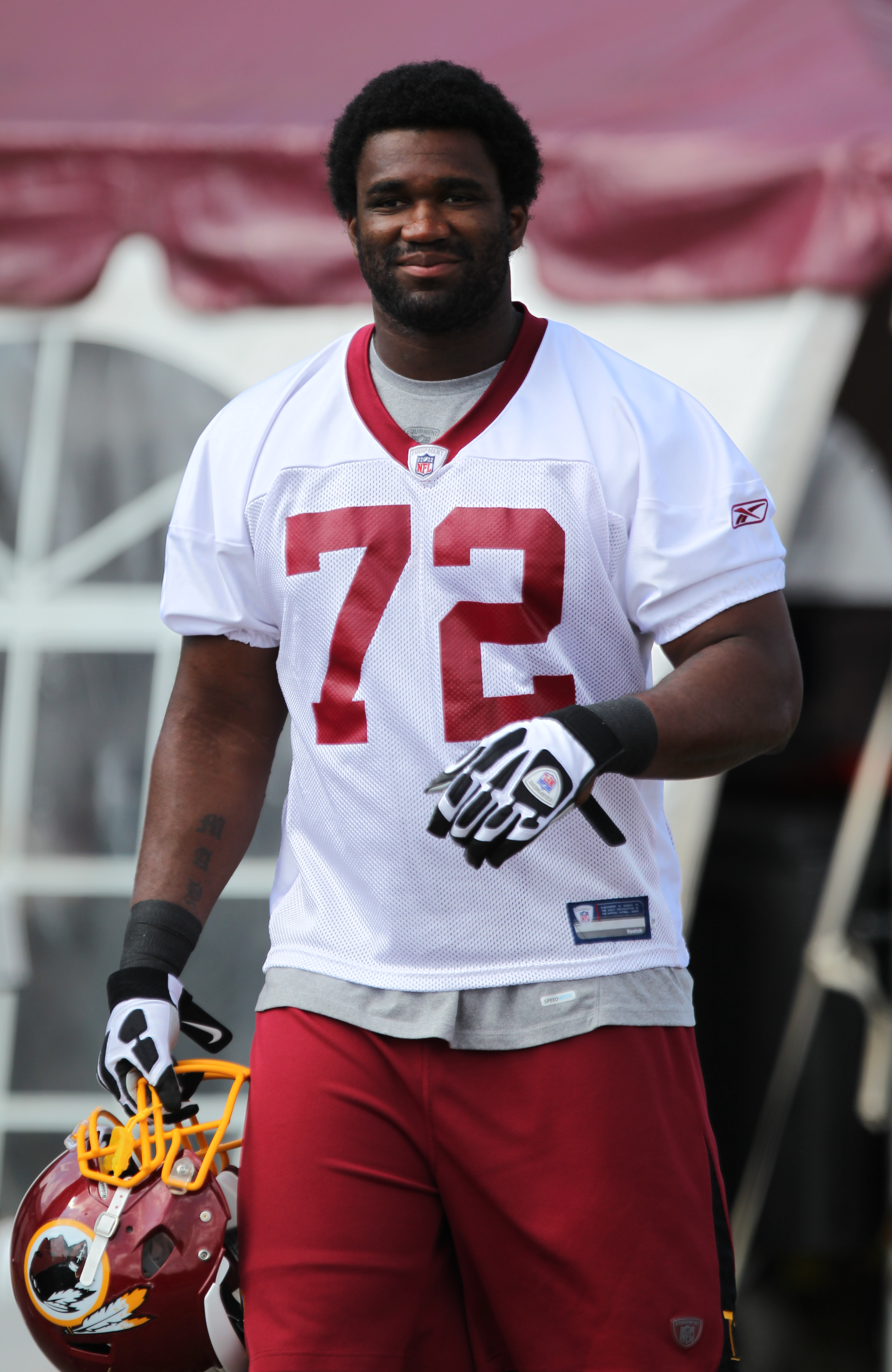
- Smith at Redskins training camp in 2011

No. 69, 79
- Position: Offensive tackle

Personal information
- Born: November 13, 1986 (age 39); Smithfield, North Carolina, U.S.
- Listed height: 6 ft 5 in (1.96 m)
- Listed weight: 310 lb (141 kg)

Career information
- High school: Kenly (NC) North Johnston
- College: East Carolina
- NFL draft: 2011: undrafted

Career history
- Washington Redskins (2011); Oakland Raiders (2012–2013); San Diego Chargers (2013–2014); Washington Redskins (2015)*; Carolina Panthers (2016)*
- * Offseason or practice squad member only

Career NFL statistics
- Games played: 29
- Games started: 11
- Stats at Pro Football Reference

Willie Junior Smith (born November 13, 1986) is an American former professional football player who was an offensive tackle in the National Football League (NFL). He was signed by the Washington Redskins as an undrafted free agent in 2011. He played college football for the East Carolina Pirates.

He was also a member of the Oakland Raiders, San Diego Chargers and Carolina Panthers.

== Professional career ==
Pre-draft measurables
Height	Weight	Arm length	Hand span	40-yard dash	10-yard split	20-yard split	20-yard shuttle	Three-cone drill	Vertical jump	Broad jump
6 ft 5 in (1.96 m)	310 lb (141 kg)	34 1/2	11 1/4	5.50 s	1.85 s	3.11 s	4.83 s	7.95 s	30.5 in (0.77 m)	8 ft 10 in (2.69 m)
All values from NFL Combine

=== Washington Redskins (first stint) ===
On July 28, 2011, the Washington Redskins signed Smith as an undrafted free agent. Due to the suspension of Trent Williams, he played his first professional game in Week 14 of the 2011 season, rotating the left tackle position with Sean Locklear. In Week 15 against the New York Giants, Smith would start his first game instead of Locklear. He continued to start as the left tackle for the rest of the 2011 season. Smith has received praise for his ability to defend against elite pass rushers Jason Pierre-Paul, Jared Allen, and Trent Cole, despite being a rookie.

During training camp in 2012, Smith split snaps at right tackle with Tyler Polumbus and Maurice Hurt after Jammal Brown was placed on the physically unable to perform (PUP) list. He was released on August 31, 2012 for final cuts before the start of the 2012 season.

=== Oakland Raiders ===
On September 1, 2012, Smith was claimed off waivers by the Oakland Raiders. On September 27, 2013, he was released.

=== San Diego Chargers ===
On November 18, 2013, Smith signed a two-year deal with the San Diego Chargers.

=== Washington Redskins (second stint) ===
Smith re-signed with the Redskins on June 2, 2015. He was released on August 31.

=== Carolina Panthers ===
On August 18, 2016, Smith signed with the Carolina Panthers. He was released by the Panthers on August 28, 2016.
