= Will Montgomery =

American football player (born 1983)

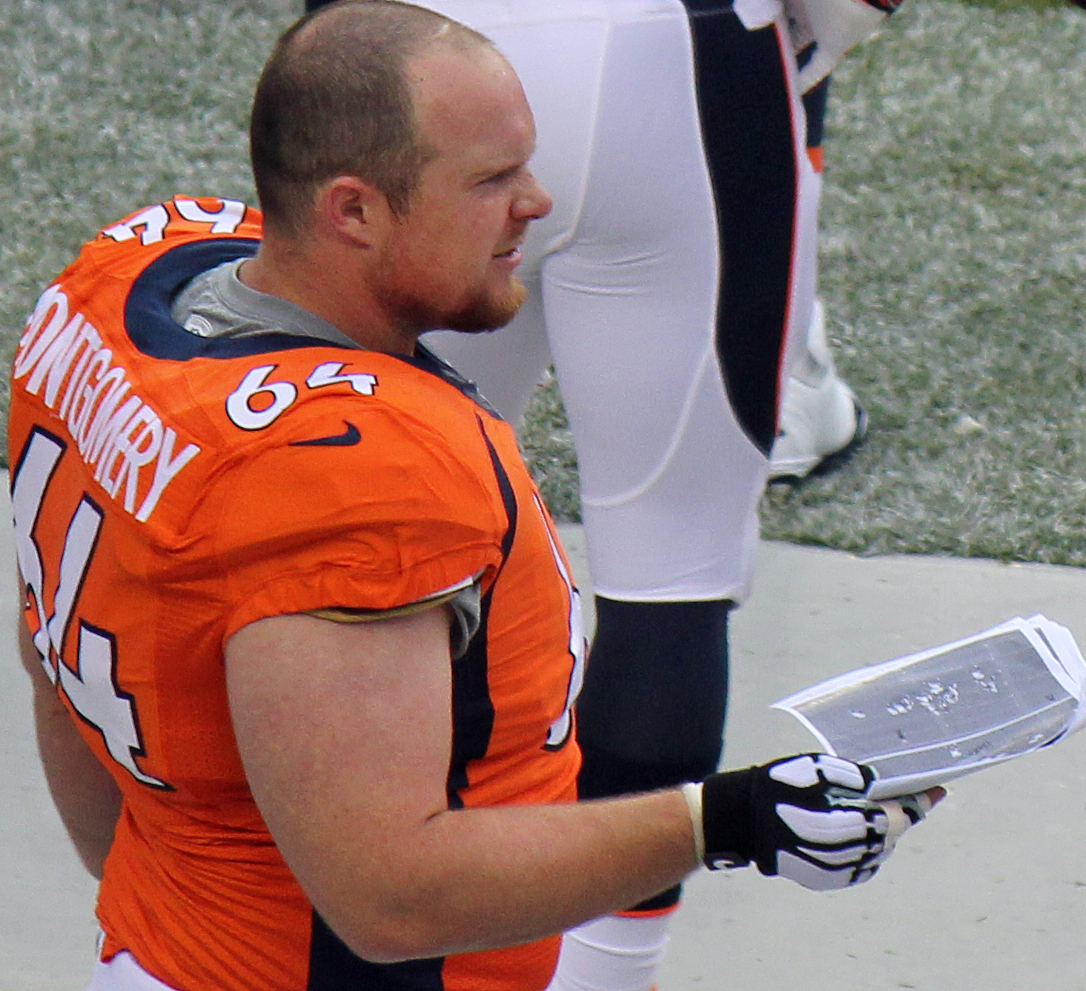
- Montgomery with the Denver Broncos in 2014

No. 66, 63, 64
- Position: Center

Personal information
- Born: February 13, 1983 (age 43); Brunswick, Maine, U.S.
- Listed height: 6 ft 3 in (1.91 m)
- Listed weight: 304 lb (138 kg)

Career information
- High school: Centreville (Clifton, Virginia)
- College: Virginia Tech
- NFL draft: 2006: 7th round, 234th overall pick

Career history
- Carolina Panthers (2006); New York Jets (2007–2008); Washington Redskins (2008–2013); Denver Broncos (2014); Chicago Bears (2015)

Awards and highlights
- First-team All-ACC (2005)

Career NFL statistics
- Games played: 110
- Games started: 75
- Stats at Pro Football Reference

William Michael Montgomery (born February 13, 1983) is an American former professional football player who was a center for 10 seasons in the National Football League (NFL). He played college football for the Virginia Tech Hokies and was selected by the Carolina Panthers in the seventh round of the 2006 NFL draft.

Montgomery also played for the New York Jets, Washington Redskins, Denver Broncos, and Chicago Bears.

== Early life ==
Montgomery attended Centreville High School in Clifton, Virginia and was a letterman in football, basketball, and baseball. In football, he won All-State honors as a senior defensive tackle.

== Professional career ==
Pre-draft measurables
Height	Weight	Arm length	Hand span	40-yard dash	10-yard split	20-yard split	20-yard shuttle	Three-cone drill	Vertical jump	Broad jump	Bench press
6 ft 3 in (1.91 m)	312 lb (142 kg)	32 in (0.81 m)	9 5/8 in (0.24 m)	4.98 s	1.71 s	2.88 s	4.43 s	7.30 s	29.5 in (0.75 m)	8 ft 8 in (2.64 m)	35 reps
All values from NFL Combine/Pro Day

In Montgomery's career, he has started in 54 contests as a center, 10 at right guard and 7 at left guard.

=== Carolina Panthers ===
Montgomery was selected by the Carolina Panthers in the seventh round (234th overall) of the 2006 NFL draft. He played a total of six games in the 2006 NFL season. The Panthers waived Montgomery on September 2, 2007.

=== New York Jets ===
Montgomery signed with the New York Jets on September 19, 2007. He was waived by the Jets on September 25, but re-signed on September 29, 2008. Montgomery was waived again on October 14, 2008.

=== Washington Redskins ===
==== 2008 season ====
Montgomery signed with the Washington Redskins on December 9, 2008, but saw no playing time in 2008 season.

==== 2009 season ====
In the 2009 season, he played in all 16 games, but had only three starts as right guard.

==== 2010 season ====
The Redskins re-signed Montgomery on March 13, 2010. In the 2010 season, he played a total of 13 games and was the starting right guard for the last six games of the season.

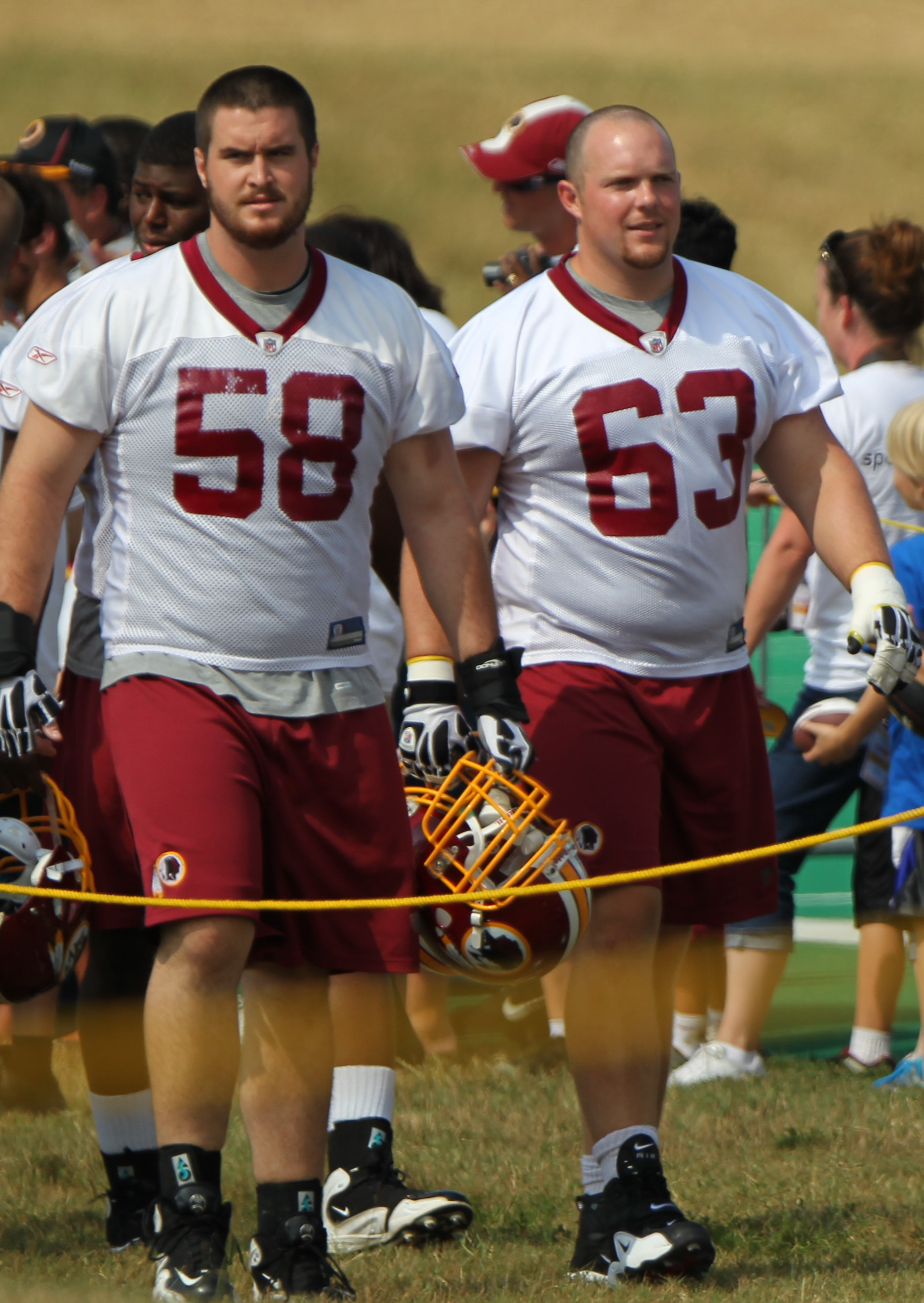
Montgomery with back-up, Erik Cook, at Redskins 2011 training camp.

==== 2011 season ====
In the 2011 season, Montgomery was moved from his original position of right guard to center. Although he became the starting center, he was moved to left guard after Kory Lichtensteiger suffered a torn ACL in Week 6. In Week 9 against the San Francisco 49ers, Montgomery moved back to center after Maurice Hurt took over as left guard. At the end of the season, he started in all 16 games for the first time in his entire career.

==== 2012 season ====
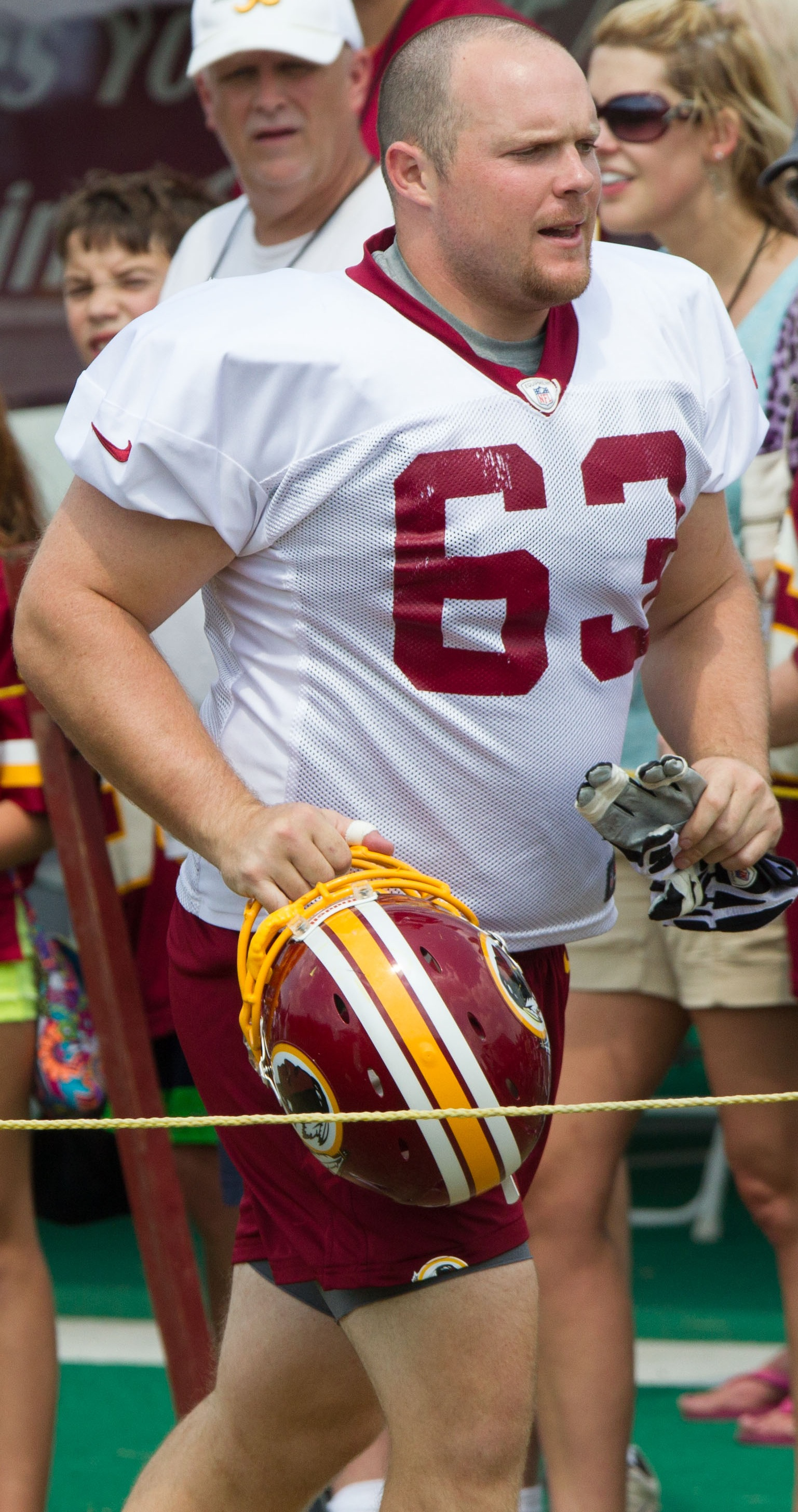
Montgomery at Redskins training camp in 2012.

Originally scheduled to be an unrestricted free agent in the 2012 season, Montgomery was re-signed by the Redskins to a four-year, $12 million contract. After the NFL cut $36 million from the Redskins' combined salary cap of the next two years, the Redskins restructured Montgomery's contract so $2 million of cap space was gained on March 16, 2012.

In the Week 13 game against the New York Giants, Montgomery jumped into a pile-on in an attempt to recover the ball that Alfred Morris fumbled. Linval Joseph tried to pull Montgomery out by yanking on his leg, but he reacted by kicking him in the groin. Joseph then stomped on Montgomery's stomach. On December 7, Montgomery was fined $10,000 for the incident. Late in the Week 15 game against the Cleveland Browns, he left the game after a player on the Browns team fell on his leg. The next day it was confirmed that he suffered a Grade 2 MCL sprain in his left leg. Montgomery was able to start in the next game against the Philadelphia Eagles.

==== 2013 season ====
Montgomery returned as the Redskins' starting center and not only started every game, but he played every snap.

On March 14, 2014, the Redskins informed Montgomery he was being released, saving the team $1.92 million in salary cap room.

=== Denver Broncos ===
On April 1, 2014, the Denver Broncos and Montgomery agreed to terms on a one-year contract. Montgomery started the final 8 games at center, helping Denver rank 8th in rushing yards (1,032) in the second half of the season.

=== Chicago Bears ===
On April 2, 2015, Montgomery and the Chicago Bears agreed to terms on a one-year contract. On October 5, 2015, Montgomery was placed on injured reserve.

== Personal ==
After retiring from football, Montgomery lost roughly around 80 pounds by December 2017.
