= Volcano Vista High School =

High School in Albuquerque, New Mexico

Coordinates: 35°10′41″N 106°44′01″W

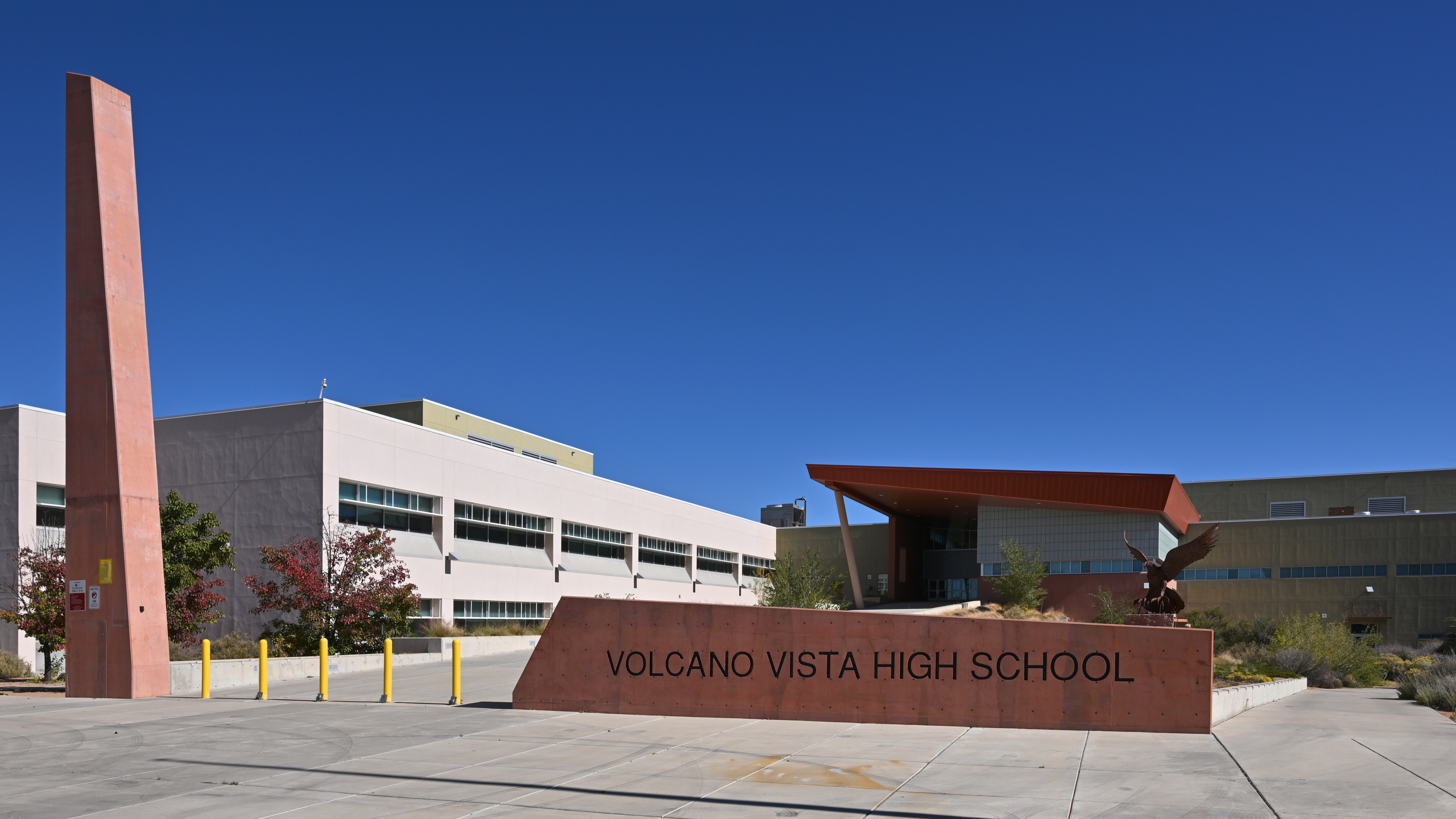

Location
- 8100 Rainbow Blvd NW, Albuquerque, New Mexico 87114; United States

Information
- Type: Public high school
- Established: 2007
- Principal: Melissa Sedillo
- Staff: 127.85 (FTE)
- Enrollment: 2,177 (2023-2024)
- Student to teacher ratio: 17.03
- Campus: Suburban, 20 acres
- Colors: Black; White; Platinum
- Athletics conference: NMAA, 6A Dist. 1
- Mascot: Hawk
- Rival: Cibola High School
- Website: vvhs.aps.edu

Volcano Vista High School (VVHS) is a public senior high school located on the West Mesa of Albuquerque, New Mexico within the Albuquerque Public Schools District; 2014 enrollment is 2,300. The school opened in August 2007 to 9th grade students, adding 10th and 11th grades in August 2008, and 12th grade in August 2009. The first students graduated in May 2010. School colors are black, white and platinum and their mascot is the Hawks. The specific species of hawk is cited to be a red-tailed hawk, as displayed in the school's main corridor.

== Academics ==
=== School grade ===
The NMPED (New Mexico Public Education department) replaced the No Child Left Behind Act and AYP testing with a new school grading formula, which took effect for the 2010–11 school years. The grade is calculated using many forms of testing, and includes graduation rates.

| School Year | Grade from NMPED |
|---|---|
| 2010-11 | B |
| 2011-12 | B |
| 2012-13 | A |
| 2013-14 | A |
| 2014-15 | B |
| 2015-16 | N/A |

=== Student body statistics ===
| Ethnicity | This school | State average |
|---|---|---|
| White (not Hispanic) | 40% | 29% |
| Hispanic | 55% | 56% |
| American Indian/Alaskan Native | 3% | 11% |
| African American | 1% | 3% |
| Pacific Islander | 2% | 1% |

== Athletics ==
VVHS competes in the New Mexico Activities Association (NMAA), as a class 6A school in District 1. In 2014, the NMAA realigned the state's schools in to six classifications and adjusted district boundaries. In addition to Volcano Vista High School, the schools in District 1-6A include Cibola High School, V. Sue Cleveland High School, Rio Rancho High School and Santa Fe High School.

VVHS has won 9 State Championships in NMAA sanctioned sports and events. VVHS competed in 4A from 2007–2010, 5A in 2011, and 6A in 2014. VVHS included a Bowling Team in September 2012.

NMAA STATE CHAMPIONSHIPS
| Season | Sport | Number of Championships | Year |
|---|---|---|---|
| Fall | Soccer, Boys | 1 | 2014 |
| Fall | Soccer, Girls | 1 | 2010 |
| Winter | Basketball, Girls | 5 | 2023, 2022, 2016, 2014, 2012 |
| Winter | Basketball, Boys | 3 | 2017, 2022, 2023 |
| Winter | Wrestling | 1 | 2010 |
| Spring | Softball | 2 | 2012, 2011 |
| Spring | Track & Field, Boys | 1 | 2015 |
| Total | | 11 | |

== Middle schools ==
LBJ Middle School is one of the middle schools which feeds into VVHS. Adjacent to VVHS, the Tony Hillerman Middle School opened in 2009.

== Notable alumni ==
- Justin Schmidt (2012), soccer player
- Brianna Martinez (2018), soccer player
- Diego Pavia (2020), college football quarterback
