= Alan Branch =

American football player (born 1984)

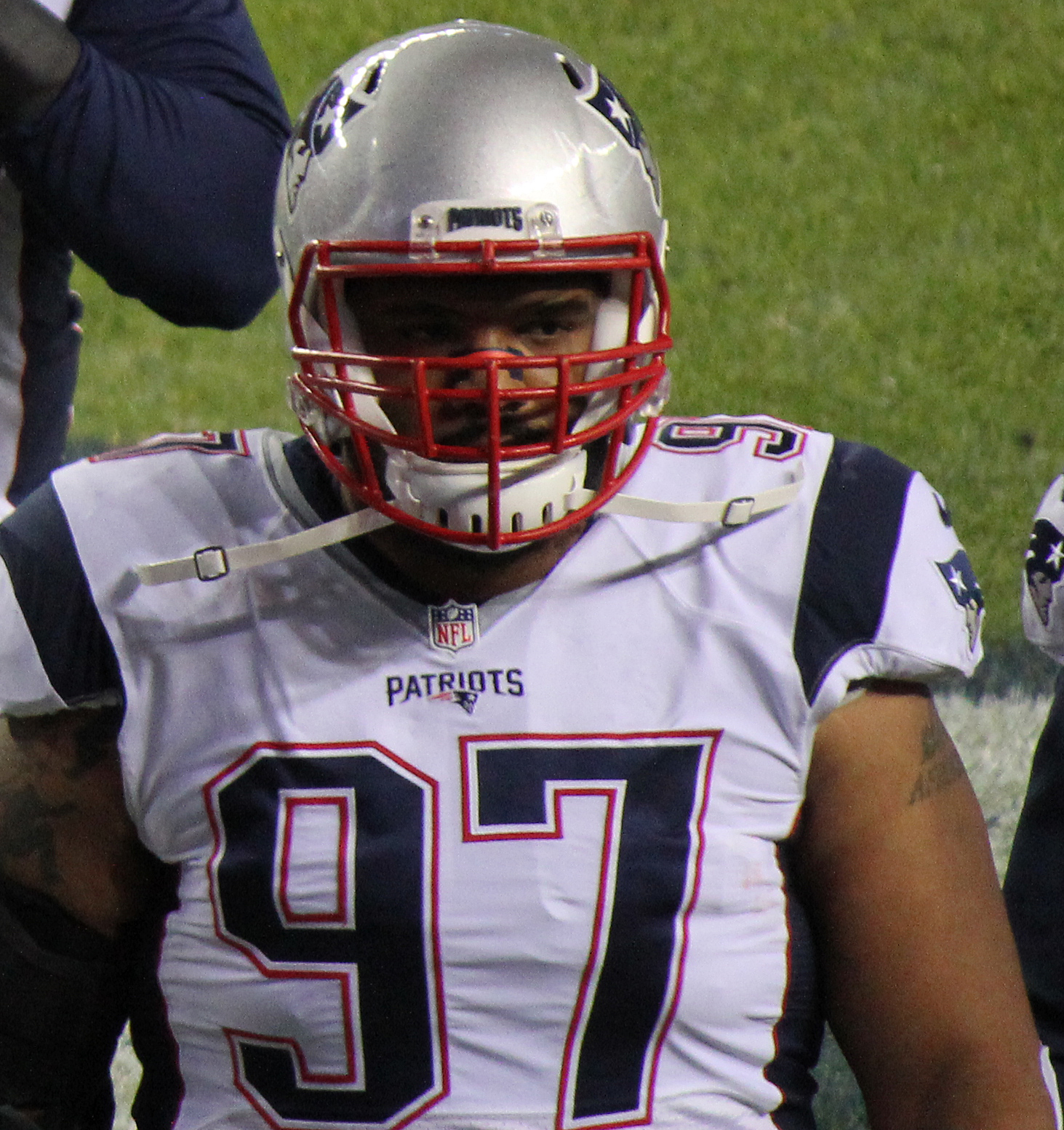
- Branch with the New England Patriots in 2015

No. 78, 99, 97, 90
- Position: Defensive tackle

Personal information
- Born: December 29, 1984 (age 41); Rio Rancho, New Mexico, U.S.
- Listed height: 6 ft 6 in (1.98 m)
- Listed weight: 350 lb (159 kg)

Career information
- High school: Cibola (Albuquerque, New Mexico)
- College: Michigan (2004–2006)
- NFL draft: 2007: 2nd round, 33rd overall pick

Career history
- Arizona Cardinals (2007–2010); Seattle Seahawks (2011–2012); Buffalo Bills (2013); New England Patriots (2014–2017)

Awards and highlights
- 2× Super Bowl champion (XLIX, LI); Second-team All-American (2006); First-team All-Big Ten (2006)

Career NFL statistics
- Total tackles: 284
- Sacks: 10.5
- Forced fumbles: 4
- Fumble recoveries: 1
- Pass deflections: 14
- Stats at Pro Football Reference

Alan Keith Branch (born December 29, 1984) is an American former professional football player who was a defensive tackle in the National Football League (NFL). He played college football for the Michigan Wolverines and was selected by the Arizona Cardinals in the second round of the 2007 NFL draft. He also played in the NFL for the Seattle Seahawks, Buffalo Bills, and New England Patriots.

== Early life ==
Branch attended Cibola High School in Albuquerque, New Mexico. In addition to playing on the defensive line, Branch also played tight end as well as running back and punt returner in high school. He scored three rushing touchdowns and two receiving touchdowns in his senior season and five punt return touchdowns for his career.

Branch was highly rated recruit and ranked as high as No. 6 nationally among defensive tackles.

Branch was also a three-year starter on the varsity basketball team, earning all-district honors as a sophomore and was second-team all-state as a junior.

High school awards

- Selected to play in 2004 U.S. Army All-American Bowl
- Gatorade Player of the Year in New Mexico
- All-State as a junior and senior
- On May 3, 2017, Branch was inducted to the Cibola High School Hall of Fame

== College career ==
Branch, along with fellow defensive all-star LaMarr Woodley, anchored one of the best defenses in college football in 2006. He had 57 tackles, 17 tackles for loss, and nine sacks in 35 career games at Michigan. He had his first interception and a fumble recovery against Ohio State on November 18, 2006. Branch played both defensive tackle and defensive end at Michigan.

He earned the following accolades while at Michigan:

- 2006 ESPN.com All-American Team
- 2006 All-Big Ten Conference First-team (coaches and media)

== Professional career ==
Pre-draft measurables
| Height | Weight | Arm length | Hand span | 40-yard dash | 10-yard split | 20-yard split | 20-yard shuttle | Three-cone drill | Vertical jump | Broad jump | Bench press |
|---|---|---|---|---|---|---|---|---|---|---|---|
| 6 ft 6 in (1.98 m) | 324 lb (147 kg) | 34 1/8 in (0.87 m) | 10 in (0.25 m) | 5.07 s | 1.75 s | 2.92 s | 4.79 s | 7.56 s | 27 1/2 in (0.70 m) | 8 ft 11 in (2.72 m) | 33 reps |

=== Arizona Cardinals ===
Branch was selected by the Arizona Cardinals with the 33rd overall pick in the second round of the 2007 NFL draft. The Cardinals acquired the pick from the Oakland Raiders. In the 2008 NFL season, the Cardinals reached Super Bowl XLIII, but lost 27–23 to the Pittsburgh Steelers.

=== Seattle Seahawks ===
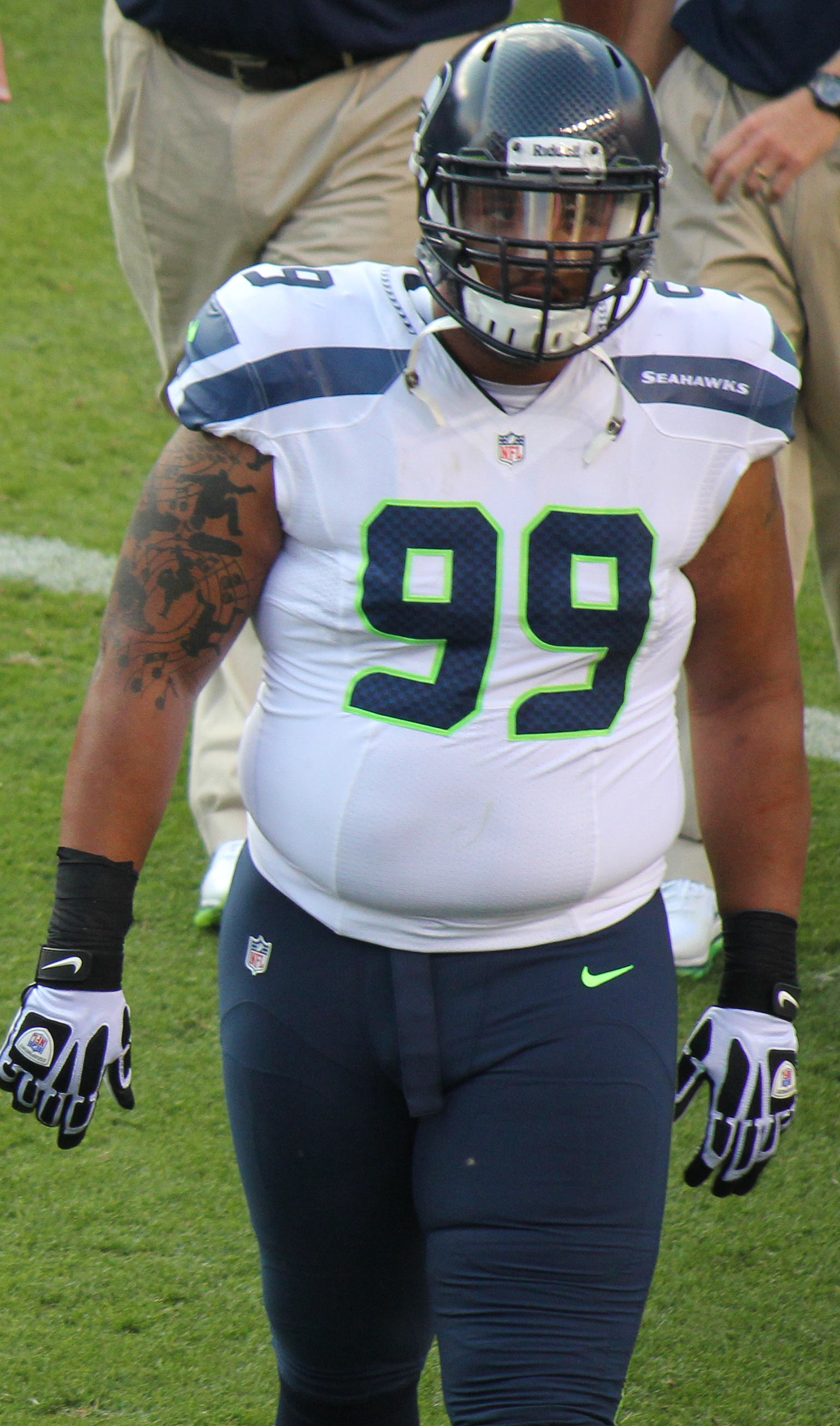
Branch in the 2012 preseason with the Seahawks.

The Seattle Seahawks signed Branch to a two-year contract on July 28, 2011.

=== Buffalo Bills ===
Branch signed a one-year contract with the Buffalo Bills on April 2, 2013.

On December 23, 2013, Branch signed a multi-year contract extension with the Bills.

On August 24, 2014, one day after being arrested for a DUI, Branch was cut from the team.

=== New England Patriots ===
On October 21, 2014, it was reported that Branch had signed a 1-year deal with the New England Patriots. The team officially announced the signing on October 29. On February 1, 2015, Branch won his first Super Bowl, defeating his former team, the Seattle Seahawks, by a score of 28–24.

On March 15, 2015, Branch re-signed with the Patriots on a two-year deal worth a maximum of $6.6 million.

On November 21, 2016, Branch was notified that he was facing a four-game suspension for violating the league's policy on substance abuse but did not have to serve any games after the league rescinded the suspension before his appeal was even heard. Branch helped the Patriots win 14 games and earn the top seed for the AFC playoffs.

On February 5, 2017, Branch was part of the Patriots team that won Super Bowl LI. In the game, the Patriots defeated the Atlanta Falcons by a score of 34–28 in overtime. The Patriots trailed 28–3 in the third quarter, but rallied all the way back to win the game, which featured the first overtime game in Super Bowl history and the largest comeback in the Super Bowl. Branch recorded three tackles, 0.5 sacks, and a crucial fumble recovery in the fourth quarter that contributed to the comeback.

On March 9, 2017, Branch signed a two-year, $12 million contract extension with the Patriots. Branch played 12 games in the 2017 season and recorded 12 tackles. Branch was inactive for the playoffs, but the Patriots still made it to the Super Bowl without him only to fall to the Philadelphia Eagles in Super Bowl LII.

On March 6, 2018, the Patriots declined the option on Branch's contract, making him a free agent in 2018.

== NFL career statistics ==
| Year | Team | GP | Comb | Solo | Asst | Sack | FF | FR | Yds | Int | Yds | Avg | Lng | TD | PD |
|---|---|---|---|---|---|---|---|---|---|---|---|---|---|---|---|
| 2007 | ARI | 11 | 9 | 8 | 1 | 0.0 | 0 | 0 | 0 | 0 | 0 | 0 | 0 | 0 | 0 |
| 2008 | ARI | 4 | 6 | 5 | 1 | 0.0 | 0 | 0 | 0 | 0 | 0 | 0 | 0 | 0 | 0 |
| 2009 | ARI | 16 | 18 | 14 | 4 | 2.0 | 0 | 0 | 0 | 0 | 0 | 0 | 0 | 0 | 2 |
| 2010 | ARI | 16 | 35 | 27 | 8 | 2.0 | 2 | 0 | 0 | 0 | 0 | 0 | 0 | 0 | 1 |
| 2011 | SEA | 15 | 34 | 21 | 13 | 3.0 | 0 | 0 | 0 | 0 | 0 | 0 | 0 | 0 | 2 |
| 2012 | SEA | 16 | 29 | 16 | 13 | 1.0 | 0 | 1 | 0 | 0 | 0 | 0 | 0 | 0 | 2 |
| 2013 | BUF | 16 | 39 | 21 | 18 | 0.0 | 0 | 0 | 0 | 0 | 0 | 0 | 0 | 0 | 1 |
| 2014 | NE | 8 | 13 | 8 | 5 | 0.0 | 0 | 0 | 0 | 0 | 0 | 0 | 0 | 0 | 1 |
| 2015 | NE | 16 | 35 | 22 | 13 | 1.0 | 2 | 0 | 0 | 0 | 0 | 0 | 0 | 0 | 2 |
| 2016 | NE | 16 | 49 | 26 | 23 | 1.5 | 1 | 0 | 0 | 0 | 0 | 0 | 0 | 0 | 3 |
| 2017 | NE | 12 | 12 | 12 | 0 | 0.0 | 0 | 0 | 0 | 0 | 0 | 0 | 0 | 0 | 0 |
| Career | | 146 | 279 | 180 | 99 | 10.5 | 5 | 1 | 0 | 0 | 0 | 0 | 0 | 0 | 15 |
