= Christian Cunningham =

American basketball player (born 1997)

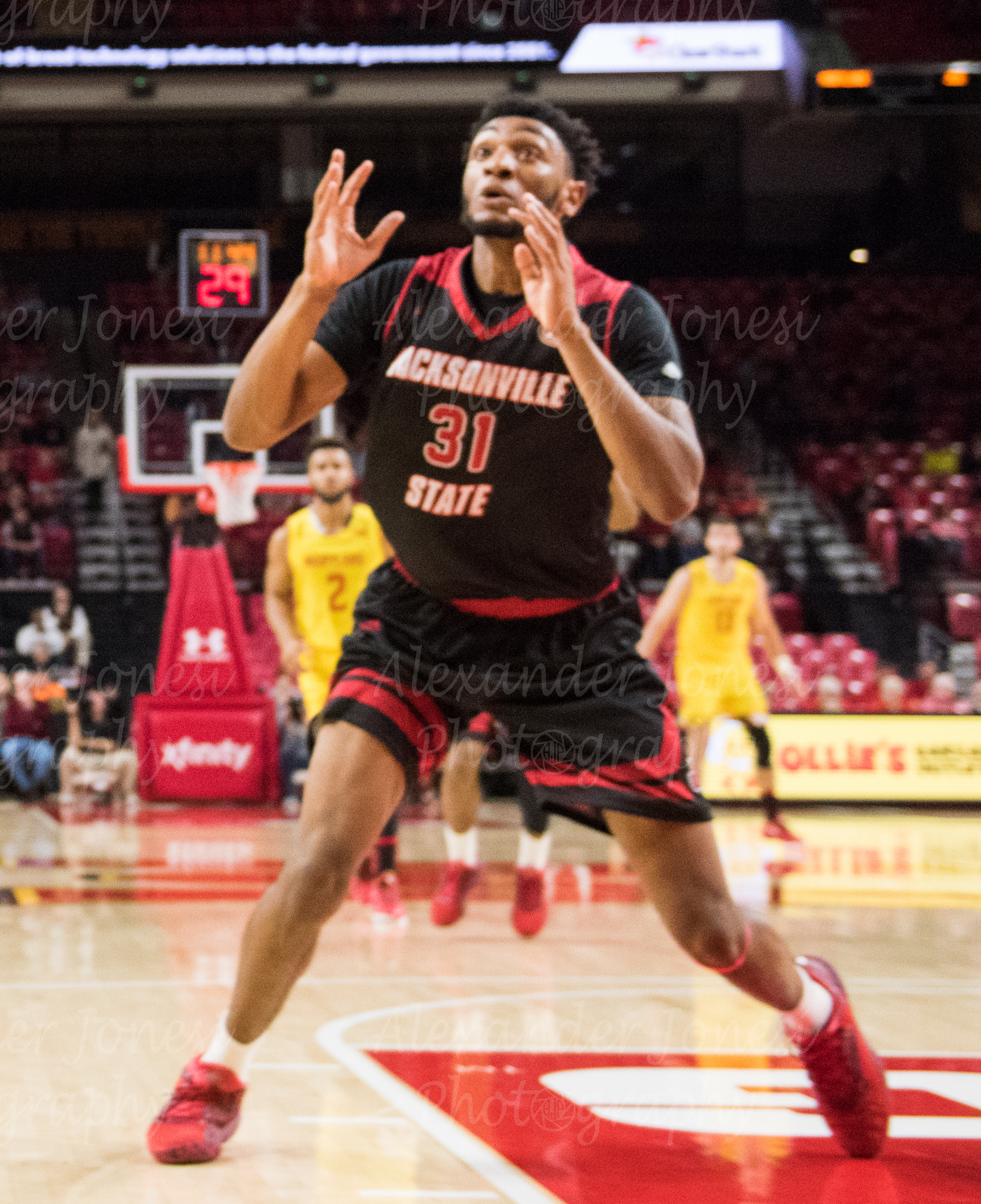

Kozuv
- Position: Forward
- League: Macedonian First League

Personal information
- Born: November 21, 1997 (age 28) El Paso, Texas, U.S.
- Listed height: 6 ft 7 in (2.01 m)
- Listed weight: 216 lb (98 kg)

Career information
- High school: Cibola (Albuquerque, New Mexico)
- College: Jacksonville State (2015–2019)
- NBA draft: 2019: undrafted
- Playing career: 2019–present

Career history
- 2019–2020: Selfoss Karfa
- 2020: Amicale Steesel
- 2020: Hapoel Be'er Sheva
- 2021: Ramat HaSharon
- 2021–2022: Kagoshima Rebnise
- 2024–2025: Fibwi Palma
- 2025–2026: Shonan United
- 2026–present: Kožuv

Christian Cianan Cunningham (born November 21, 1997) is an American basketball player for the Kožuv of the Macedonian First League. He plays the forward position.

== Biography ==
Cunningham was born in El Paso, Texas, and his hometown is Albuquerque, New Mexico. His parents are Viola and Paul Cunningham. He is 6 ft 7 in (201 cm) tall, and weighs 216 pounds (98 kg).

He attended Cibola High School ('15) in New Mexico. Cunningham played basketball for the Cibola Cougars, and was a first team all-district player in his junior year.

Cunningham attended Jacksonville State University ('19). He played basketball for the Jacksonville State Gamecocks. In his sophomore year in 2016–17, he ranked second in the Ohio Valley Conference in blocked shots per game (1.7), third in offensive rebounds (2.9), fourth in field goal percentage (61.3), and set the JSU NCAA Division-I single-season rebounding record (275) and block record (59). In his junior year in 2017–18 he led the Ohio Valley Conference in field goal percentage (.661) and blocked shots (57), and had 8.1 rebounds per game. In his senior season in 2018–19 he was named Preseason All-OVC and was second in the OVC in field-goal percentage (.624), and fourth in shots blocked per game (1.7) and offensive rebounds per game (3.0). He is Jacksonville State's all-time blocks leader (215), and its NCAA Division-I career rebounding leader (864) and field-goal percentage leader (.621).

In December 2020 Cunningham joined Hapoel Be'er Sheva in the Israeli Basketball Premier League.
