= Maurice Hurt =

American football player (born 1987)

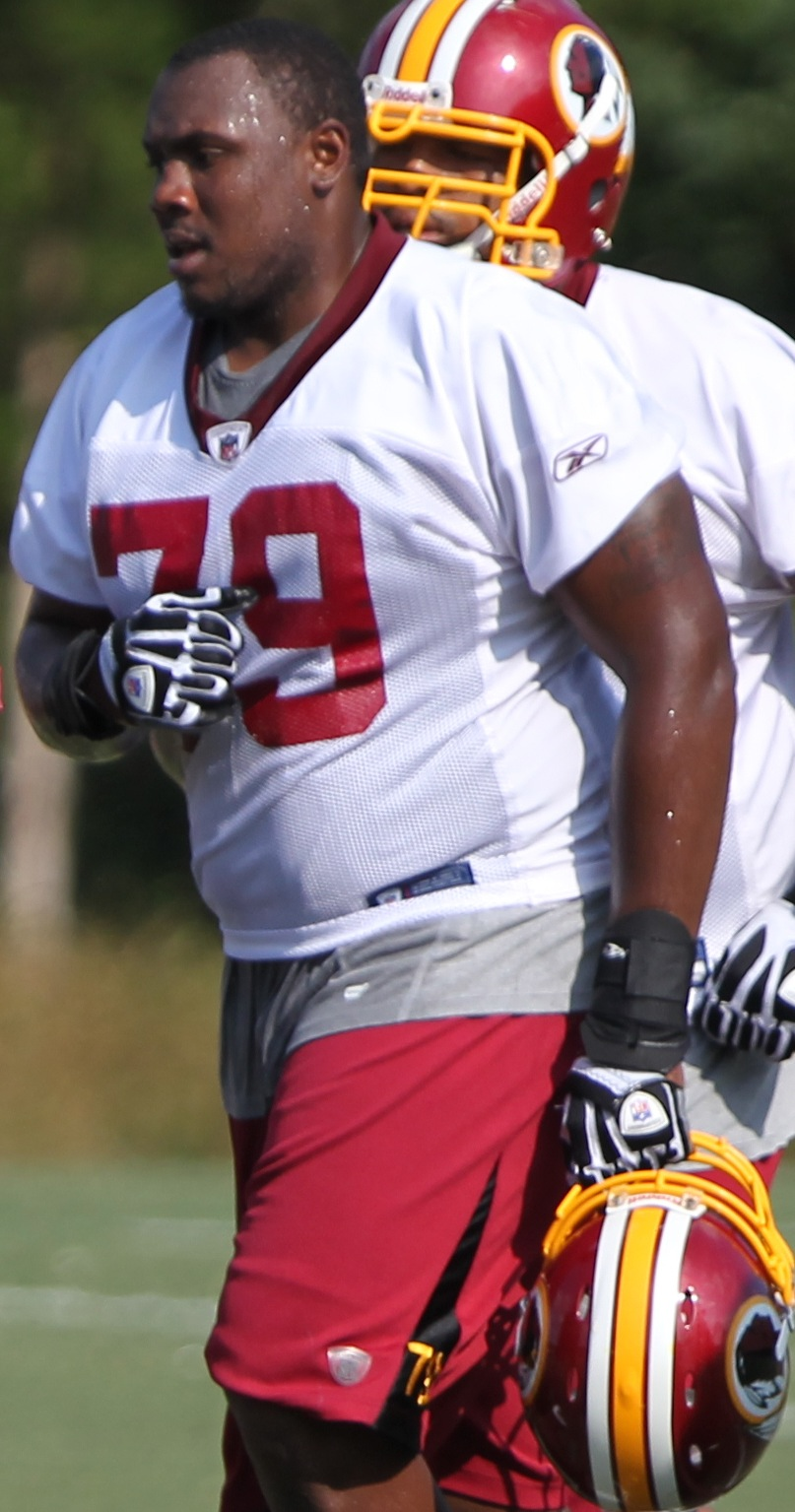
- Hurt with the Washington Redskins in 2011

No. 79
- Position: Guard

Personal information
- Born: September 8, 1987 (age 39); Milledgeville, Georgia, U.S.
- Listed height: 6 ft 3 in (1.91 m)
- Listed weight: 329 lb (149 kg)

Career information
- High school: Baldwin (Milledgeville)
- College: Florida
- NFL draft: 2011: 7th round, 217th overall pick

Career history
- Washington Redskins (2011–2013)

Awards and highlights
- BCS national champion (2007, 2009)

Career NFL statistics
- Games played: 21
- Games started: 9
- Stats at Pro Football Reference

Sparrow Maurice "Mo" Hurt, Jr. (born September 8, 1987) is an American former professional football player who was a guard in the National Football League (NFL). He played college football for the Florida Gators, and was a member of two BCS National Championship teams. He was selected by the Washington Redskins in the seventh round of the 2011 NFL draft.

== Early life ==
Hurt was born in Milledgeville, Georgia, and named for his father, Sparrow Maurice Hurt. He attended Baldwin High School in Milledgeville, and played high school football for the Baldwin Braves.

== College career ==
Hurt accepted an athletic scholarship to attend the University of Florida, where he played for coach Urban Meyer's Gators from 2006 to 2010. He played in three games as a true freshman in 2006, but was subsequently redshirted by his coaches. As a redshirt sophomore in 2008, he was a member of the Gators' SEC Championship team, and played in the 2009 BCS Championship Game in which the Gators defeated the Oklahoma Sooners 24–14.

== Professional career ==
Pre-draft measurables
| Height | Weight | Arm length | Hand span | Wingspan | 40-yard dash | 10-yard split | 20-yard split | 20-yard shuttle | Three-cone drill | Vertical jump | Broad jump | Bench press |
|---|---|---|---|---|---|---|---|---|---|---|---|---|
| 6 ft 2 5/8 in (1.90 m) | 318 lb (144 kg) | 34 1/8 in (0.87 m) | 9 in (0.23 m) | 6 ft 8 5/8 in (2.05 m) | 5.39 s | 1.93 s | 3.09 s | 4.90 s | 8.13 s | 29.0 in (0.74 m) | 8 ft 1 in (2.46 m) | 19 reps |
All values from NFL Combine/Pro Day

Hurt was selected in the seventh round with the 217th overall pick in the 2011 NFL draft by the Washington Redskins. He was waived on September 3, 2011, but signed to the practice squad on September 4, 2011. On October 19, 2011, Hurt was signed to the active roster. In Week 9 against San Francisco 49ers, Hurt made his NFL debut and first career start as left guard of the offensive line. Hurt continued to start as the left guard for the rest of the season replacing Kory Lictensteiger, who was out for the season due to tearing his ACL.

During the 2012 offseason, Hurt stated that he was getting practice reps at the tackle position. During training camp, he split snaps at left guard with Josh LeRibeus after Kory Lichtensteiger had arthroscopic surgery and split snaps at right tackle with Tyler Polumbus and Willie Smith after Jammal Brown was placed on the physically unable to perform (PUP) list. After playing as a reserve guard for most of the season, Hurt started at right tackle in Week 16 against the Philadelphia Eagles for Tyler Polumbus, who suffered a concussion in the previous game.

Hurt was placed on the Redskins PUP list on August 31, 2013, to allow him to recover from arthroscopic knee surgery, meaning he would miss at least the first six games of the 2013 season. The team moved him from the PUP list to injured reserve on December 4, 2013.

The Redskins waived him on August 30, 2014, for final roster cuts before the start of the 2014 season.

== See also ==
- 2000 Florida Gators football team
- List of Florida Gators in the NFL draft
- List of Washington Redskins players
