= Tyler Polumbus =

American football player (born 1985)

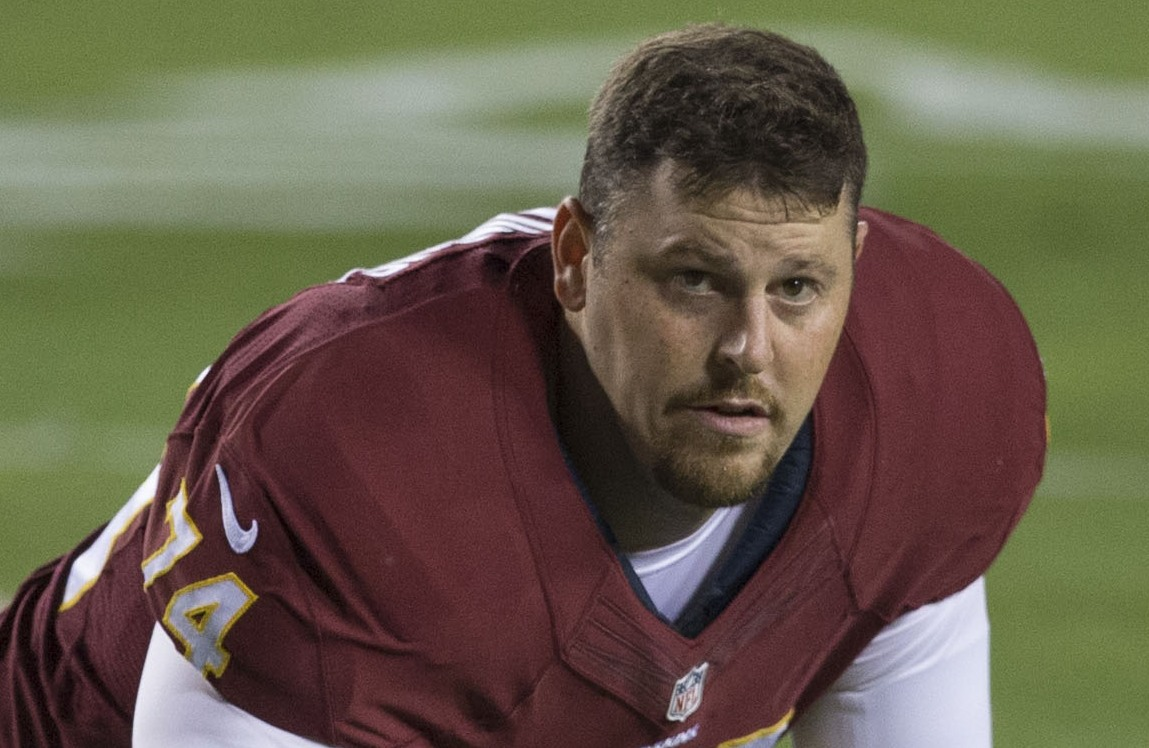
- Polumbus with the Washington Redskins in 2014

No. 74, 78, 76, 79
- Position: Offensive tackle

Personal information
- Born: April 10, 1985 (age 41); Denver, Colorado, U.S.
- Listed height: 6 ft 8 in (2.03 m)
- Listed weight: 308 lb (140 kg)

Career information
- High school: Cherry Creek (Greenwood Village, Colorado)
- College: Colorado (2003–2007)
- NFL draft: 2008: undrafted

Career history
- Denver Broncos (2008−2009); Detroit Lions (2010)*; Seattle Seahawks (2010−2011); Washington Redskins (2011−2014); Atlanta Falcons (2015); Denver Broncos (2015)
- * Offseason or practice squad member only

Awards and highlights
- Super Bowl champion (50)

Career NFL statistics
- Games played: 112
- Games started: 57
- Fumble recoveries: 2
- Stats at Pro Football Reference

Tyler Polumbus (born April 10, 1985) is an American former professional football player who was an offensive tackle in the National Football League (NFL). He was signed by the Denver Broncos as an undrafted free agent in 2008. He played college football for the Colorado Buffaloes.

In addition to the Broncos, Polumbus was also a member of the Detroit Lions, Seattle Seahawks, Washington Redskins, and Atlanta Falcons.

== Early life ==
Polumbus played football for Cherry Creek High School in Greenwood Village, Colorado. He was named a SuperPrep All-American in 2002.

== College career ==
From 2003 to 2007, Polumbus played at the University of Colorado Boulder. After his senior year with the Buffaloes, league coaches named him to the All-Big 12 second team.

== Professional career ==
Pre-draft measurables
Height	Weight	Arm length	Hand span	40-yard dash	10-yard split	20-yard split	20-yard shuttle	Three-cone drill	Vertical jump	Broad jump	Bench press
6 ft 7 1/2 in (2.02 m)	312 lb (142 kg)	32 in (0.81 m)	9 3/8 in (0.24 m)	5.13 s	1.78 s	2.90 s	4.83 s	7.59 s	33.0 in (0.84 m)	9 ft 4 in (2.84 m)	24 reps
All values from NFL Combine/Pro Day

=== Denver Broncos (first stint) ===
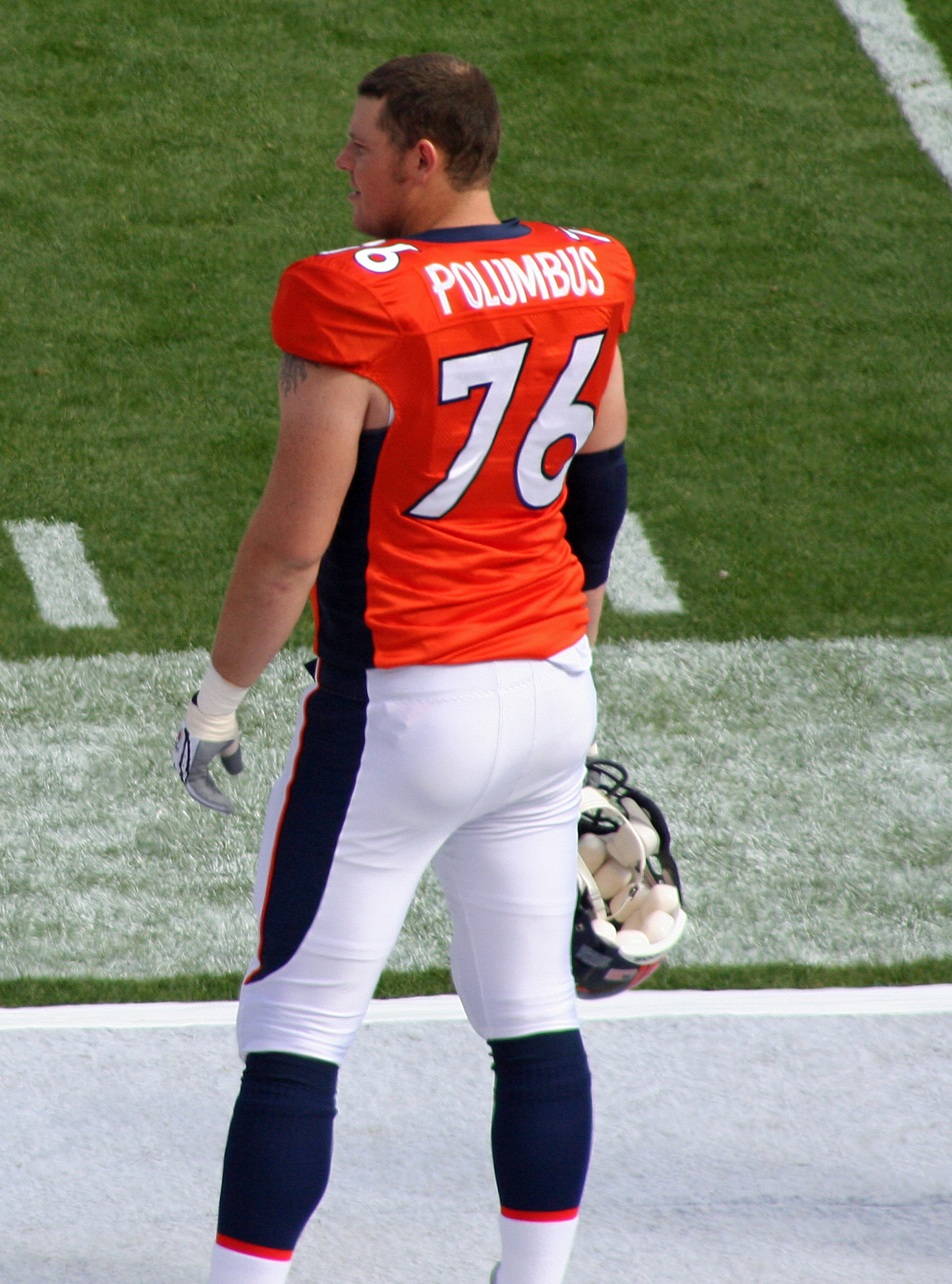
Polumbus during his first tenure with the Denver Broncos

On April 29, 2008, the Denver Broncos signed Polumbus as an undrafted free agent. He made his NFL debut in Week 1 against the Oakland Raiders. He finished the 2008 season playing in all 16 games as a backup lineman.

Polumbus had his first career start in Week 9 of the 2009 season against the Pittsburgh Steelers. By the end of the season, he had played in 15 games and started eight of them.

Polumbus was waived by the team on August 24, 2010. In 2024, Polumbus shared that the Seattle Seahawks and Houston Texans were interested in trading for him, but coach Josh McDaniels chose to forego the trade offers and waive him out of spite. Seattle would end up trading for him a few days later after he was claimed by Detroit.

=== Detroit Lions ===
Polumbus was claimed off waivers by the Detroit Lions on August 25, 2010.

=== Seattle Seahawks ===
On August 31, 2010, the Lions traded Polumbus to the Seattle Seahawks for an undisclosed draft pick. He started at left tackle his first two games in place of injured Russell Okung. He played in 15 games, starting 7 of them, by the end of the 2010 season.

After playing five games in the 2011 season, the Seahawks waived him on October 25, 2011.

=== Washington Redskins ===
On November 9, 2011, the Washington Redskins signed Polumbus to the 53-man roster. In Week 11 against the Dallas Cowboys, Polumbus would start as the left guard subbing in for Maurice Hurt. Polumbus would unexpectedly start as the right tackle in Week 15 after Jammal Brown suffered a groin injury during pre-game warmups. At the end of the 2011 season, he played a total of five games, starting four of them.

During 2012 training camp, Polumbus split snaps at right tackle with Maurice Hurt and Willie Smith after Jammal Brown was placed on the physically unable to perform (PUP) list. After starting at right tackle during the first three preseason games, he was officially announced as the starting right tackle for the opening of the 2012 season after Brown had hip surgery on August 27. On October 26, Polumbus was fined $7,875 for a leg whip in Week 7. In Week 15 against the Cleveland Browns, he was forced to leave the game early after suffering a concussion. He would miss the next game against the Philadelphia Eagles due to this concussion.

Set to become a free agent in the 2013 season, Polumbus agreed to a new two-year contract with the Redskins on March 18, 2013.

Polumbus began the 2014 season as the starting right offensive tackle. Before the Week 8 game against the Dallas Cowboys, it was announced by head coach Jay Gruden that Polumbus would be benched in favor of Tom Compton.

=== Atlanta Falcons ===
On May 14, 2015, the Atlanta Falcons signed Polumbus. On September 29, 2015, the Falcons released Polumbus.

=== Denver Broncos (second stint) ===
On October 1, 2015, just two days after being released by the Falcons, the Broncos signed Polumbus to a one-year deal.

On February 7, 2016, Polumbus was part of the Broncos team that won Super Bowl 50. In the game, the Broncos defeated the Carolina Panthers by a score of 24–10.

== Post-retirement ==
Polumbus currently operates a YouTube channel with 7.2k subscribers.

He also co-hosts a daily radio show in Denver, Colorado with Scott Hastings and Darren "DMac" McKee on KKSE 92.5 from noon to 3PM.
