= Kevin A. Short =

American painter and printmaker

Kevin Short
- Born: August 9, 1960 (age 57); San Diego, California, United States
- Known for: Painting, printmaking
- Notable work: Trestles, Santa Fe, Glare

Kevin A. Short (born August 9, 1960) is an American painter and printmaker, recognized for his modern landscapes of the Pacific Coast and American Southwest. He is considered an integral observer and portrayer of the surfing subculture. His use of heavy brushstrokes and vivid pigments are a recognizable trademark of his painting style.

Glare-Peace Alights and Wanders

== Biography ==
Kevin Short was brought up in a creative- and scientific-minded family, living originally along San Diego Bay, California, and later moving to Santa Barbara County. It was there that he developed the hobbies of sailing, surfing, and going to the beach. While riding his bicycle through town, he noticed surf posters with artwork by Rick Griffin stapled to the telephone poles, an early influence on the young artist.

A family move to Albuquerque, New Mexico became a formative influence in Short’s work: as a profound melancholy set in, he would find respite in painting and drawing the ocean. During these years, his feelings about living in the desert began to change. Becoming a hot air balloon pilot and viewing the New Mexico desert from above gave Short a new appreciation for his home. Though his parents were supportive of their son’s early artistic interests and obvious talent, Short’s desire to follow in his father’s footsteps as a scientist was his original vocational goal. This resolve was soon dashed, however, by conflicts with a high school chemistry teacher. At the encouragement of Dorothy Black, a student of Lorser Feitelson, Short decided to reset his goals and study at the Art Center College of Design in Pasadena. First, he studied painting at the University of New Mexico from 1978 to 1980, exploring Modernism and Abstract Expressionism. Outside of classes, he painted murals and worked for the US Department of Defense, generating artwork for the Airborne Laser Laboratory's Boeing NC-135.

In 1980, Short moved back to California to study at Pepperdine University in Malibu prior to entrance at the Art Center College of Design.

Before graduating from Art Center, he introduced himself to his childhood hero, Rick Griffin, and requested an apprenticeship. Griffin responded instead with an offer of friendship. He became a source of guidance and influence from this point in Short's life.

In 1984, Short graduated and began a career in painting advertisements for PepsiCo, Microsoft, Xerox, IBM, The Walt Disney Company, and various newspapers and magazines.

Moving back to the beach inspired Short to resume painting the ocean and other subject matter relating to surf subculture.

After being featured on the cover of The Surfer's Journal, Peter Stoessel of Blue Rain Gallery (Santa Fe, New Mexico) encouraged Short to re-explore his paintings of the Southwest. Short now works out of his studios in Southern California and Durango, Colorado.

Last Session at Trestles

In 2013 Short was selected for a retrospective of his work by the Carnegie Museum of Art in Ventura County, California. The retrospective exhibition “Diffusion- Paintings of Blinding Light" featured a collection of “glare” paintings.

In 2015 Short was selected for a retrospective of selected paintings by the California Surf Museum in Oceanside, California. The retrospective exhibition “Trestles" featured a collection of “A History of Trestles by Kevin Short” paintings.

In 2016 his piece Well Chosen Path was the featured "In the Land of Sunshine” exhibit at the Pasadena Museum of California Art, Pasadena, California.

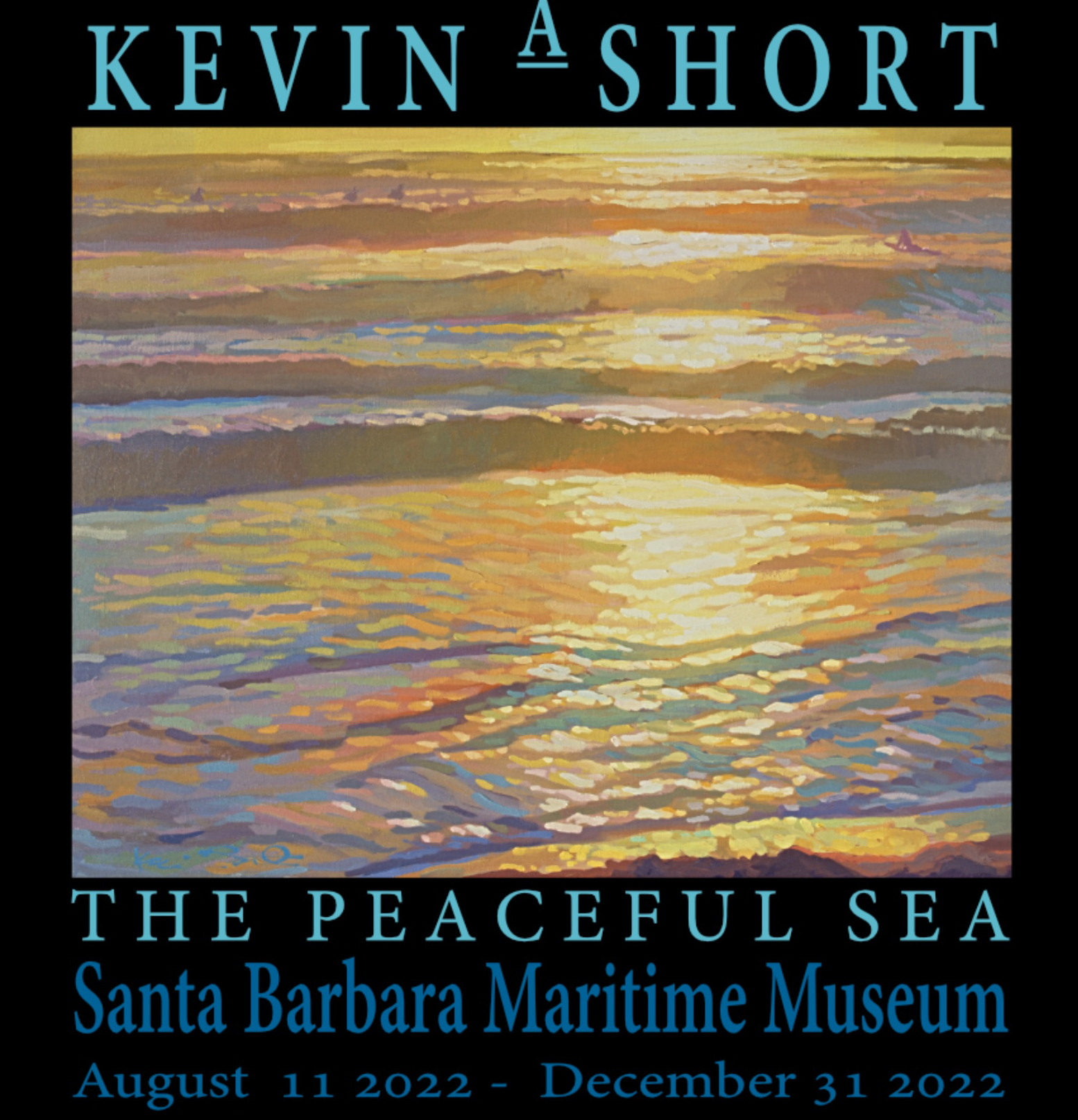
The Peaceful Sea

Short's long-awaited Santa Barbara retrospective opened in 2022 at The Santa Barbara Maritime Museum: "The Peaceful Sea" was an exhibition which featured 35 seascapes and ocean-themed landscapes.

The Albuquerque International Balloon Fiesta selected Short as the official poster artist for the 51st Annual Hot Air Balloon Fiesta of 2023.

Short's paintings are in the permanent collections of the Irvine Museum, Hilbert Museum of California Art, First Foundation Bank, Sprint Nextel Art Collection, U.S. Steel. and the Scripps Cardiac Center Collection.

== Education ==
In 1984 he earned a bachelor's degree at Art Center College of Design in Pasadena, California.

== Selected exhibitions ==
- One Man Show - Blue Rain Gallery, Santa Fe, New Mexico (2003)
- One Man Show - Parker Ranch Gallery, Waimea, Hawaii (2004)
- One Man Show - Blue Rain Gallery, Santa Fe, New Mexico (2007)
- Solo Exhibition- John Wayne Airport (2010)
- Retrospective - Carnegie Museum of Art in Ventura County, California.
- Selection - 100 Years of Plein Air Painting, Irvine Museum, Irvine, California (2014)
- One Man Show - Hamilton Galleries, Santa Monica, California (June 2015)
- Retrospective - California Surf Museum in Oceanside, California (September 2015)
- Selection - "In the Land of Sunshine” Pasadena Museum of California Art, Pasadena, California (2016)
- Retrospective - “The Peaceful Sea” Santa Barbara Maritime Museum, California (August 2022)
