= Ryan Cook (American football) =

American football player (born 1983)

No. 62, 63
- Position: Center

Personal information
- Born: May 8, 1983 (age 43); Albuquerque, New Mexico, U.S.
- Listed height: 6 ft 6 in (1.98 m)
- Listed weight: 325 lb (147 kg)

Career information
- High school: Cibola (Albuquerque)
- College: New Mexico (2001–2005)
- NFL draft: 2006: 2nd round, 51st overall pick

Career history
- Minnesota Vikings (2006–2010); Miami Dolphins (2011); Dallas Cowboys (2012–2013)

Awards and highlights
- 3× First-team All-MW (2003, 2004, 2005)

Career NFL statistics
- Games played: 90
- Games started: 51
- Fumble recoveries: 2
- Stats at Pro Football Reference

Ryan Cook (born May 8, 1983) is an American former professional football player who was a center for eight seasons in the National Football League (NFL). He played college football for the New Mexico Lobos and was selected in the second round of the 2006 NFL draft by the Minnesota Vikings. He also played for the Miami Dolphins and Dallas Cowboys.

== Early life ==
Cook played offensive tackle for Cibola High School under head coach Ben Shultz. He was a three-year letterman, and earned First Team All-City and Second Team All-State honors as a senior and Second Team All-City as a sophomore. He also accepted an invitation to play in the New Mexico North-South All-Star game.

== College career ==
Cook played for the University of New Mexico for the 2002–2005 seasons. Originally a walk-on, he received a scholarship in his second season. He earned All-Mountain West first team honors at center for three consecutive years, being the first center to do so in New Mexico's history.

In his career, he had 416 knockdown blocks, averaging 8.7 per game in 46 games. As a senior, he was also invited to play in the East-West Shrine Game and the Senior Bowl, accepting the invitation of the latter.

== Professional career ==
Pre-draft measurables
Height	Weight	Arm length	Hand span	40-yard dash	10-yard split	20-yard split	20-yard shuttle	Three-cone drill	Vertical jump	Broad jump	Bench press
6 ft 6 5/8 in (2.00 m)	328 lb (149 kg)	33 in (0.84 m)	9 5/8 in (0.24 m)	5.45 s	1.83 s	3.10 s	4.66 s	7.93 s	26.5 in (0.67 m)	8 ft 1 in (2.46 m)	28 reps
All values from NFL Combine

=== Minnesota Vikings ===
Cook was selected by the Minnesota Vikings in the second round (51st overall) of the 2006 NFL draft. He signed a four-year contract. In the 2007 and 2008 seasons, he was a regular starter at right tackle.

He lost his starting position in the 2009 season to rookie Phil Loadholt. On April 12, 2010, he signed a one-year contract as a restricted free agent and became a starter at right guard.

On August 4, 2011, Cook was re-signed to a two-year contract. On September 3, he was released in the final cuts before the start of the 2011 season.

=== Miami Dolphins ===
Cook signed with the Miami Dolphins as a free agent on September 5, 2011. During the season, he played as a backup center and guard. The next year, he was beaten out by rookie Josh Samuda for the backup center role.

On August 31, 2012, he was traded to the Dallas Cowboys, in exchange for a seventh round draft pick (#224-Kevin Dorsey).

=== Dallas Cowboys ===
After being with the team less than a week, he was forced to assume the starting center role when Phil Costa aggravated a back injury after the first series of the season opener. He became the starter for the rest of the season, after Costa suffered a partially dislocated ankle in the fifth game against the Carolina Panthers. In the 2013 training camp, he was placed on the injured reserve list after suffering a back injury.

== Personal life ==
Cook is the older brother of Erik Cook, a center who played for the Washington Redskins. Ryan is married to Laura Cook (owner dentist at SkyRidge Dental in Lakeway, Texas). Ryan has 4 children: Ashlyn, Colette, Quinn, and Griffin.
