= Erik Cook =

American football player (born 1987)

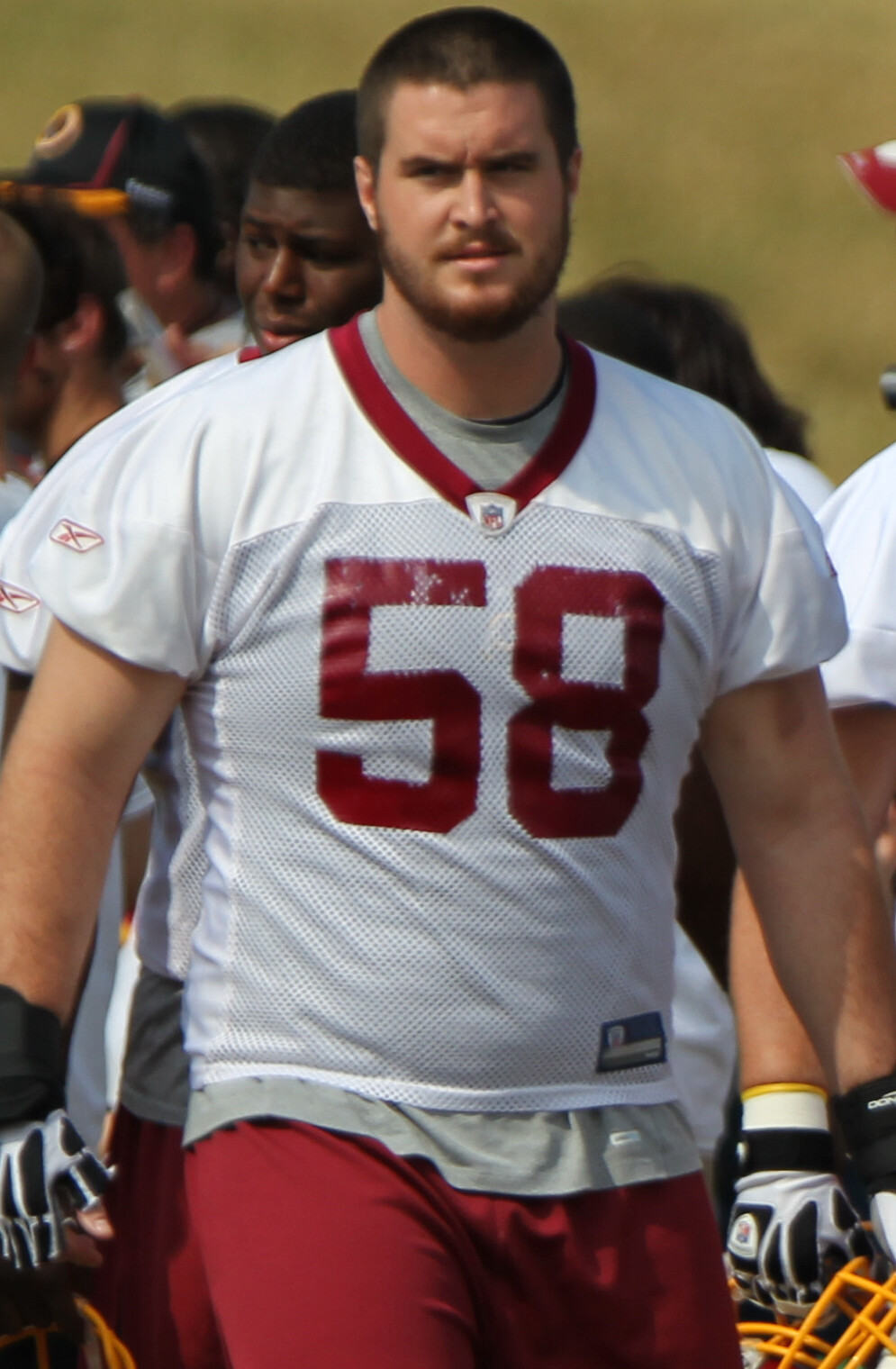
- Cook with the Washington Redskins in 2011

No. 58
- Position: Center

Personal information
- Born: July 5, 1987 (age 39); Albuquerque, New Mexico, U.S.
- Listed height: 6 ft 6 in (1.98 m)
- Listed weight: 308 lb (140 kg)

Career information
- High school: Cibola (Albuquerque)
- College: New Mexico
- NFL draft: 2010: 7th round, 229th overall pick

Career history
- Washington Redskins (2010–2011); New York Jets (2013)*
- * Offseason or practice squad member only

Awards and highlights
- First-team All-MW (2009); Second-team All-MW (2008)

Career NFL statistics
- Games played: 6
- Games started: 2
- Stats at Pro Football Reference

Erik Marvin Cook (born July 5, 1987) is an American former professional football player who was a center in the National Football League (NFL). He was selected by the Washington Redskins in the seventh round of the 2010 NFL draft. He played college football for the New Mexico Lobos.

== Professional career ==
=== Washington Redskins ===
Cook was selected by the Washington Redskins in the seventh round of the 2010 NFL draft. He was released by the team on September 4, 2010 and was signed to the practice squad the next day. On December 11, 2010, Cook was promoted to the active 53-man roster to fill the roster spot created by the suspension of Albert Haynesworth.

In the 2011 season, Cook made his NFL debut in Week 6 against the Philadelphia Eagles subbing in as the left guard after Kory Lichtensteiger tore his ACL. In Week 7, Cook would have his first career start, but as center while starting center, Will Montgomery, played left guard. The reason for this being that coaches felt that Cook was a better center than guard.

Cook was released on August 31, 2012 for final cuts before the start of the 2012 season.

=== New York Jets ===
Cook was signed by the New York Jets on August 4, 2013. He was released on August 31, 2013.

== Personal life ==
His older brother is Ryan Cook, a second round 2006 NFL draft pick who formerly played for the Dallas Cowboys.
