= Jammal Brown =

American football player (born 1981)

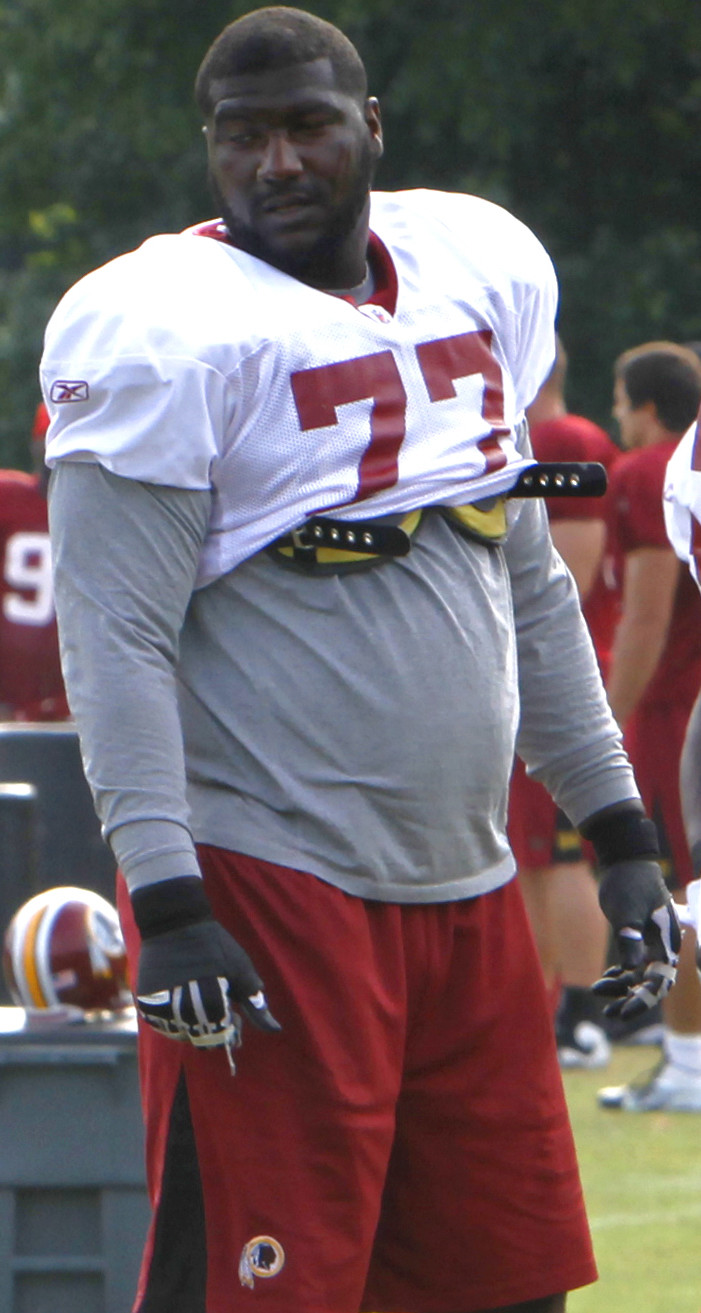
- Brown with the Washington Redskins in 2011

No. 70, 77
- Position: Offensive tackle

Personal information
- Born: March 30, 1981 (age 45); Waxahachie, Texas, U.S.
- Listed height: 6 ft 6 in (1.98 m)
- Listed weight: 317 lb (144 kg)

Career information
- High school: MacArthur (Lawton, Oklahoma)
- College: Oklahoma (2000–2004)
- NFL draft: 2005: 1st round, 13th overall pick

Career history
- New Orleans Saints (2005–2009); Washington Redskins (2010–2012)

Awards and highlights
- Super Bowl champion (XLIV); First-team All-Pro (2006); 2× Pro Bowl (2006, 2008); PFWA All-Rookie Team (2005); BCS national champion (2000); Outland Trophy (2004); Jim Parker Trophy (2004); Unanimous All-American (2004); First-team All-American (2003); 2× First-team All-Big 12 (2003, 2004); Second-team All-Big 12 (2002)

Career NFL statistics
- Games played: 85
- Games started: 84
- Fumble recoveries: 1
- Stats at Pro Football Reference

Jammal Filbert Brown (born March 30, 1981) is an American former professional football player who was an offensive tackle for seven seasons in the National Football League (NFL). He played college football for the Oklahoma Sooners, receiving unanimous All-American recognition. Brown was chosen by the New Orleans Saints in the first round of the 2005 NFL draft. He was selected for the Pro Bowl twice and won Super Bowl XLIV with the team. He also played for the Washington Redskins.

== Early life ==
Brown was born in Waxahachie, Texas. He attended MacArthur High School in Lawton, Oklahoma and was a letterman in football in the defensive lineman position. As a senior, he won all-state honors as a defensive lineman. He graduated from MacArthur High School in 2000.

== College career ==
Brown attended the University of Oklahoma, where he played for coach Bob Stoops's Oklahoma Sooners football team from 2000 to 2004. He had been recruited as a defensive tackle, but was switched to offensive tackle in his sophomore year, and quickly blossomed, and secured a starting spot on the Sooners' offensive line. As a senior in 2004, he won the Outland Trophy as the nation's most outstanding lineman. He was the anchor of an offensive line that paved the way for Adrian Peterson to set the record for most rushing yardage by a freshman in 2004. His contributions were key to the Sooners winning the 2004 Big 12 Championship. He was a first-team All-Big 12 selection in 2003 and 2004, he was an All-American in 2003 and a unanimous first-team All-American in 2004.

== Professional career ==
Brown, while on the Saints, at the Alamodome, with Army Medical Center amputee patients.

=== Pre-draft ===
Brown was regarded as one of the best offensive tackles available in the 2005 NFL draft, and drew comparisons to Jordan Gross.

Pre-draft measurables
Height	Weight	40-yard dash	10-yard split	20-yard split	20-yard shuttle	Three-cone drill	Vertical jump	Broad jump	Bench press	Wonderlic
6 ft 5 7/8 in (1.98 m)	316 lb (143 kg)	5.06 s	1.78 s	2.94 s	4.67 s	7.93 s	31 1/2 in (0.80 m)	9 ft 1 in (2.77 m)	26 reps	12
All values from NFL Combine

=== New Orleans Saints ===
Brown was selected by the New Orleans Saints with the 13th overall pick. Brown was the first Sooner offensive lineman taken in the draft since Stockar McDougle went to the Detroit Lions as the 20th overall pick in the 2000 NFL draft. Remarkably, Brown was the highest selection among OU offensive lineman since Stan West was the No. 8 pick by the Los Angeles Rams in 1950.

He was selected to attend the 2006 Pro Bowl alongside the player he protected, quarterback Drew Brees, after anchoring the line that got the Saints to the NFC Championship Game. Brown's prototypical size at left tackle makes him good at both run and pass blocking. He led the league in rushing average behind left tackle while only allowing 3 sacks. He was again selected with Brees to participate in the 2008 Pro Bowl.

A torn ACL kept Brown out of action in 2009. The emergence of Jermon Bushrod in his absence resulted in him losing his starting job and an eventual trade to the Washington Redskins.

=== Washington Redskins ===
Brown was traded to the Washington Redskins on June 19, 2010, for a third or a fourth round pick in the 2011 NFL draft, depending on which pick is sent to the Eagles as a part of the trade for quarterback, Donovan McNabb. The pick was used to select Martez Wilson. Brown was made the starting right tackle of the offensive line. At the end of 2010 season, he played in 15 games and started 14 of them.

On July 31, 2011, the Redskins re-signed Brown to a five-year, $20.25 million contract. As with the 2010 season, he was hampered by the hip surgery he received in 2009. In Week 15 of the 2011 season against the New England Patriots, he suffered a groin injury during pre-game warmups and was replaced by Tyler Polumbus. At the end of the 2011 season, Brown played and started a total of 12 games.

At the start of 2012 training camp, Brown was placed on the physically unable to perform list due to hip soreness on July 26, 2012. Despite initial reports saying he would not need to undergo surgery, Brown had hip surgery on August 27 and expected to miss four to six weeks while recovering. By the start of the 2012 season, he was kept on the PUP list meaning he would not be allowed to play in the first six games of the season. On November 28, the Redskins decided to leave him on the season-ending PUP list. Due to how Brown's contract was restructured last season, the last three years on his contract became void on February 8, 2013, which set him up to become an unrestricted free agent for 2013 season.
