= 2009 Florida Gators football team =

American college football season

2009 Florida Gators football

SEC Eastern Division champion Sugar Bowl champion

SEC Championship Game, L 13–32 vs. Alabama

Sugar Bowl, W 51–24 vs. Cincinnati
- Conference: Southeastern Conference
- Eastern Division

Ranking
- Coaches: No. 3
- AP: No. 3
- Record: 13–1 (8–0 SEC)
- Head coach: Urban Meyer (5th season)
- Offensive coordinator: Steve Addazio (1st season)
- Offensive scheme: Spread option
- Defensive coordinator: Charlie Strong (7th season)
- Base defense: 3–3–5
- MVPs: Tim Tebow; Joe Haden
- Captains: Brandon James; Joey Sorrentino; Brandon Spikes; Ryan Stamper; Tim Tebow
- Home stadium: Ben Hill Griffin Stadium

2009 Southeastern Conference football standings
	Conf.			Overall
Team	W		L	W		L
Eastern Division
No. 3 Florida x%	8	–	0	13	–	1
Georgia	4	–	4	8	–	5
Tennessee	4	–	4	7	–	6
Kentucky	3	–	5	7	–	6
South Carolina	3	–	5	7	–	6
Vanderbilt	0	–	8	2	–	10
Western Division
No. 1 Alabama x$#	8	–	0	14	–	0
No. 17 LSU	5	–	3	9	–	4
No. 20 Ole Miss	4	–	4	9	–	4
Arkansas	3	–	5	8	–	5
Auburn	3	–	5	8	–	5
Mississippi State	3	–	5	5	–	7
Championship: Alabama 32, Florida 13
# – BCS National Champion; $ – BCS representative as conference champion; % – BCS at-large representative; x – Division champion/co-champions; Rankings from AP Poll

The 2009 Florida Gators football team represented the University of Florida in the sport of American football during the 2009 college football season. The Gators competed in the Football Bowl Subdivision (FBS) of the National Collegiate Athletic Association (NCAA) and the Eastern Division of the Southeastern Conference (SEC), and played their home games at Ben Hill Griffin Stadium on the university's Gainesville, Florida campus. They were led by fifth-year head coach Urban Meyer, who coached the Gators to a first-place finish in the SEC East, a 51–24 Sugar Bowl victory over the Cincinnati Bearcats, and an overall win–loss record of 13–1 (.929).

With senior quarterback Tim Tebow and eleven defensive starters returning, the Gators had hoped to repeat as back-to-back national champions following their BCS National Championship at the end of the 2008 season. They finished with an undefeated 12–0 regular season, their first since 1995, but the Gators' 32–13 loss to the Alabama Crimson Tide in the SEC Championship Game derailed their national title hopes, and forced them to settle for a berth in the Sugar Bowl. At the conclusion of the 2009 season, the Gators were ranked No. 3 in both major polls.

On December 26, 2009, Gators athletic director Jeremy Foley announced that Urban Meyer would step down as the team's head coach for health and family reasons. The following day, Meyer stated that he would instead take an indefinite leave of absence, allowing him to resume his position as the head coach. Meyer returned to coach the Gators in spring practice in March 2010.

== Pre-season ==
On January 11, 2009, during the national championship celebration at the University of Florida, quarterback Tim Tebow announced his intention to return for his senior season, followed on January 15 by linebacker Brandon Spikes intention to return as well. With Spikes' return, the entire two-deep of the Gators defense was set to return for the 2009 season. One major loss was All-America wide receiver Percy Harvin, who opted to leave the University of Florida to enter the 2009 NFL draft.

The Gators also lost offensive coordinator and quarterback coach Dan Mullen, who became the head coach at Mississippi State following Sylvester Croom's resignation. Former offensive line coach Steve Addazio was named as Mullen's replacement, with Scot Loeffler hired to take on the role of quarterback coach.

The Gators played their spring scrimmage on April 18, 2009, with the Orange winning.

Florida was voted #1 in both the preseason USA Today Coaches' Poll and the AP Poll. The Gators received the highest ever percentage of preseason #1 votes in the history of the AP Poll, which began in 1950.

== Schedule ==
Date	Time	Opponent	Rank	Site	TV	Result	Attendance
September 5	7:00 p.m.	Charleston Southern*	No. 1	Ben Hill Griffin Stadium; Gainesville, FL	FSN	W 62–3	90,621
September 12	12:00 p.m.	Troy*	No. 1	Ben Hill Griffin Stadium; Gainesville, FL	SECN	W 56–6	90,349
September 19	3:30 p.m.	Tennessee	No. 1	Ben Hill Griffin Stadium; Gainesville, FL (rivalry)	CBS	W 23–13	90,894
September 26	6:00 p.m.	at Kentucky	No. 1	Commonwealth Stadium; Lexington, KY (rivalry)	ESPN2	W 41–7	71,011
October 10	8:00 p.m.	at No. 4 LSU	No. 1	Tiger Stadium; Baton Rouge, LA (rivalry, College GameDay)	CBS	W 13–3	93,129
October 17	2:30 pm	Arkansas	No. 1	Ben Hill Griffin Stadium; Gainesville, FL	CBS	W 23–20	90,508
October 24	7:30 p.m.	at Mississippi State	No. 2	Davis Wade Stadium; Starkville, MS	ESPN	W 29–19	57,178
October 31	3:30 p.m.	vs. Georgia	No. 1	Jacksonville Municipal Stadium; Jacksonville, FL (rivalry)	CBS	W 41–17	84,604
November 7	7:15 p.m.	Vanderbilt	No. 1	Ben Hill Griffin Stadium; Gainesville, FL	ESPN2	W 27–3	90,694
November 14	3:30 p.m.	at South Carolina	No. 1	Williams–Brice Stadium; Columbia, SC	CBS	W 24–14	79,297
November 21	12:30 p.m.	FIU*	No. 1	Ben Hill Griffin Stadium; Gainesville, FL	PPV	W 62–3	90,473
November 28	3:30 p.m.	Florida State*	No. 1	Ben Hill Griffin Stadium; Gainesville, FL (rivalry, College GameDay)	CBS	W 37–10	90,907
December 5	4:30 p.m.	vs. No. 2 Alabama	No. 1	Georgia Dome; Atlanta, GA (SEC Championship Game, rivalry,College GameDay)	CBS	L 13–32	75,514
January 1, 2010	8:30 p.m.	vs. No. 4 Cincinnati*	No. 5	Louisiana Superdome; New Orleans, LA (Sugar Bowl)	FOX	W 51–24	65,207
*Non-conference game; Rankings from AP Poll released prior to the game

== Rankings ==
Ranking movements Legend: ██ Increase in ranking ██ Decrease in ranking ( ) = First-place votes
	Week															
Poll	Pre	1	2	3	4	5	6	7	8	9	10	11	12	13	14	Final
AP	1 (58)	1 (56)	1 (56)	1 (55)	1 (55)	1 (54)	1 (50)	2 (20)	1 (30)	1 (38)	1 (39)	1 (36)	1 (36)	1 (46)	5	3
Coaches	1 (53)	1 (56)	1 (56)	1 (59)	1 (58)	1 (57)	1 (53)	1 (49)	1 (46)	1 (50)	1 (48)	1 (48)	1 (47)	1 (53)	5	3
Harris	Not released				1 (99)	1 (97)	1 (99)	1 (77)	1 (75)	1 (83)	1 (82)	1 (78)	1 (78)	1 (82)	5	Not released
BCS	Not released							1	1	1	1	1	1	1	5	Not released

== Game summaries ==
=== Charleston Southern ===
Quarter	1	2	3	4	Total
Buccaneers	0	3	0	0	3
#1 Gators	14	28	13	7	62

at Ben Hill Griffin Stadium, Gainesville, Florida

- Date: September 5, 2009
- Game time: 7:00 p.m. ET
- Game weather: 81 °F (27 °C) (Cloudy)
- Game attendance: 90,621
- Referee: Matt Moore
- TV: Sun/FSN

Game information

1st Quarter

- FLA – Jeffery Demps, 8-yard run (Jonathan Phillips kick), 11:05. Gators 7–0.
- FLA – Chris Rainey, 76-yard run (Jonathan Phillips kick), 4:34. Gators 14–0.

2nd Quarter

- FLA – Tim Tebow, 1-yard run (Jonathan Phillips kick), 14:22. Gators 21–0.
- FLA – Jeffery Demps, 23-yard run (Jonathan Phillips kick), 11:39. Gators 28–0.
- FLA – Aaron Hernandez, 28-yard pass from Tim Tebow (Jonathan Phillips kick), 7:55. Gators 35–0.
- CSU – John Paglia 38-yard field goal, 5:37. Gators 35–3.
- FLA – Brandon James 85-yard kickoff yard return (Jonathan Phillips kick), 5:24. Gators 42–3.

3rd Quarter

- FLA – Justin Williams 7-yard pass from John Brantley (PAT failed), 12:39. Gators 48–3.
- FLA – Cade Holliday 9-yard pass from John Brantley (Jonathan Phillips kick), 0:24. Gators 55–3.

4th Quarter

- FLA – Mike Gillislee 7-yard run (Jonathan Philips kick), 9:33. Gators 62–3.

In the season opener, the Gators met the Charleston Southern Buccaneers in Gainesville. In a game that was never close, the Gators won 62–3. John Brantley threw for 67 yards and 2 touchdowns.

=== Troy ===
Quarter	1	2	3	4	Total
Trojans	3	0	3	0	6
#1 Gators	7	28	14	7	56

at Ben Hill Griffin Stadium, Gainesville, Florida

- Date: September 12, 2009
- Game time: 12:20 p.m. ET
- Game weather: 81 °F (27 °C) (Light rain)
- Game attendance: 90,349
- Referee: Tom Ritter
- TV: SEC Network

Game information

1st Quarter

- FLA – Deonte Thompson, 6-yard pass from Tim Tebow (Jonathan Phillips kick), 6:39. Gators 7–0.
- TROY – Sam Glusman, 45-yard field goal, 0:51. Gators 7–3.

2nd Quarter

- FLA – Riley Cooper, 36-yard pass from Tim Tebow (Jonathan Phillips kick), 11:33. Gators 14–3.
- FLA – Tim Tebow, 4-yard run (Jonathan Phillips kick), 8:04. Gators 21–3.
- FLA – Deonte Thompson, 33-yard pass from Tim Tebow (Jonathan Phillips kick), 7:44. Gators 28–3.
- FLA – Jeffery Demps, 24-yard run (Jonathan Phillips kick), 4:03. Gators 35–3.

3rd Quarter

- FLA – Brandon James, 32-yard pass from Tim Tebow (Jonathan Phillips kick), 12:27. Gators 42–3.
- FLA – Chris Rainey 1-yard run (Caleb Sturgis kick), 8:38. Gators 49–3.
- TROY – Sam Glusman 42-yard field goal, 0:39. Gators 49–6.

4th Quarter

- FLA – Mike Gillislee 6-yard pass from John Brantley (Caleb Sturgis kick), 6:19. Gators 56–6.

The Florida Gators met the Troy Trojans in Gainesville, Florida. After a slow start, the Gators scored four times in the second quarter before cruising to a 56–6 victory.

=== Tennessee ===
Quarter	1	2	3	4	Total
Volunteers	3	3	0	7	13
#1 Gators	3	10	10	0	23

at Ben Hill Griffin Stadium, Gainesville, Florida

- Date: September 19, 2009
- Game time: 3:30 p.m. ET
- Game weather: 89 °F (32 °C) (Partly cloudy)
- Game attendance: 90,894
- Referee: Penn Wagers
- TV announcers (CBS): Verne Lundquist (play–by–play), Gary Danielson (color commentator), Tracy Wolfson (sideline reporter)

Game information

1st Quarter

- FLA – Caleb Sturgis, 37-yard field goal, 11:33. Gators 3–0.
- TENN – Daniel Lincoln, 24-yard field goal, 3:00. Tied 3–3.

2nd Quarter

- FLA – Tim Tebow, 1-yard run (Caleb Sturgis kick), 12:48. Gators 10–3.
- TENN – Daniel Lincoln, 20-yard field goal, 5:56. Gators 10–6.
- FLA – Caleb Sturgis, 29-yard field goal, 0:51. Gators 13–6.

3rd Quarter

- FLA – Caleb Sturgis, 35-yard field goal, 9:33. Gators 16–6.
- FLA – Jeffery Demps 7-yard run (Caleb Sturgis kick), 0:07. Gators 23–6.

4th Quarter

- TENN – Montario Hardesty 17-yard run (Daniel Lincoln kick), 8:11. Gators 23–13.

In what may have been the most talked about game all pre-season, the Florida Gators and Tennessee Volunteers met in Gainesville, Florida. Most of the pre-game talk surrounded comments made by Volunteers head coach Lane Kiffin. Despite Kiffin’s talk during his introductory press conference, of singing Rocky Top all night long after they beat Florida, Tennessee played very conservatively on offense and was kept out of the end zone until the fourth quarter, by which time they were down 23-6 and ended with the Gators holding on for a 23–13 victory.

=== Kentucky ===
Quarter	1	2	3	4	Total
#1 Gators	31	0	3	7	41
Wildcats	0	7	0	0	7

at Commonwealth Stadium, Lexington, Kentucky

- Date: September 26, 2009
- Game time: 6:00 p.m. ET
- Game weather: 70 °F (21 °C) (Mostly cloudy)
- Game attendance: 71,011
- Referee: Steve Shaw
- TV: ESPN2

Scoring Summary
Q	Team	Time	Scoring Play		Extra Point	Score		
Q	Team	Time	Scoring Play		Extra Point	+	FLA	KTY
1	FLA	11:13	FG	Caleb Sturgis 32 yd FG		3	3	0
1	FLA	7:11	TD	Tim Tebow, 3 yd run	Caleb Sturgis Kick	7	10	0
1	FLA	6:04	TD	Chris Rainey, Recovers blocked punt in end zone	Caleb Sturgis Kick	7	17	0
1	FLA	5:56	TD	Tim Tebow, 2 yd run	Caleb Sturgis Kick	7	24	0
1	FLA	0:00	TD	Aaron Hernandez, 44 yd pass from Tim Tebow	Caleb Sturgis Kick	7	31	0
2	KTY	2:44	TD	Ross Bogue 2 yd pass from Mike Hartline	Lones Seiber Kick	7	31	7
3	FLA	3:45	FG	Caleb Sturgis 32 yd FG		3	34	7
4	FLA	6:39	TD	Riley Cooper 8 yd pass from John Brantley	Caleb Sturgis Kick	7	41	7

In their first road game of the season, the Florida Gators traveled to Lexington, Kentucky to face the Wildcats. The Gators quickly took at 31–0 lead in the first quarter before going on to win 41–7. The biggest news story to come out of the game was a concussion suffered by Tim Tebow during the third quarter. Tebow spent the night in a Lexington hospital; returning two weeks later for Florida's 13–3 win at LSU.

=== LSU ===
Quarter	1	2	3	4	Total
#1 Gators	3	7	0	3	13
#4 Tigers	0	3	0	0	3

at Tiger Stadium, Baton Rouge, Louisiana

- Date: October 10, 2009
- Game time: 8:00 p.m. ET
- Game weather: 69 °F (21 °C) (Clear)
- Game attendance: 93,129
- Referee: Hubert Owens
- TV announcers (CBS): Verne Lundquist (play–by–play), Gary Danielson (color commentator), Tracy Wolfson (sideline reporter)

Game information

1st Quarter

- FLA – Caleb Sturgis, 28-yard field goal, 3:50. Gators 3–0.

2nd Quarter

- LSU – Josh Jasper, 18-yard field goal, 5:16. Tied 3–3.
- FLA – Riley Cooper, 24-yard pass from Tim Tebow (Caleb Sturgis kick), 0:50. Gators 10–3.

3rd Quarter

- None.

4th Quarter

- FLA – Caleb Sturgis, 32-yard field goal, 7:27. Gators 13–3.

Leading passers

- FLA – Tim Tebow – 11/16, 134 yards, 1 TD, 1 INT
- LSU – Jordan Jefferson – 11/17, 96 yards, 1 INT

Leading rushers

- FLA – Jeffery Demps – 16 rushes, 86 yards
- LSU – Charles Scott – 13 rushes, 53 yards

Leading receivers

- FLA – Aaron Hernandez – 6 receptions, 70 yards
- LSU – Brandon LaFell – 4 receptions, 44 yards

=== Arkansas ===
Quarter	1	2	3	4	Total
Razorbacks	0	10	3	7	20
#1 Gators	0	3	10	10	23

at Ben Hill Griffin Stadium, Gainesville, Florida

- Date: October 17, 2009
- Game time: 3:30 p.m. ET
- Game weather: 64 °F (18 °C) (Sunny)
- Game attendance: 90,508
- Referee: Marc Curles
- TV announcers (CBS): Verne Lundquist (play–by–play), Gary Danielson (color commentator), Tracy Wolfson (sideline reporter)

Game information

1st Quarter

- None.

2nd Quarter

- ARK – Broderick Green, 1-yard run (Alex Tejada kick), 3:00. Razorbacks 7–0.
- FLA – Caleb Sturgis, 30-yard field goal, 1:40. Razorbacks 7–3.
- ARK – Alex Tejada, 22-yard field goal, 0:00. Razorbacks 10–3.

3rd Quarter

- FLA – Caleb Sturgis, 51-yard field goal, 10:53. Razorbacks 10–6.
- FLA – Deonte Thompson, 77-yard pass from Tim Tebow (Caleb Sturgis kick), 2:59. Gators 13–10.
- ARK – Alex Tejada, 31-yard field goal, 0:07. Tied 13–13.

4th Quarter

- ARK – Greg Childs, 75-yard pass from Ryan Mallett (Alex Tejada kick), 9:40. Razorbacks 20–13.
- FLA – Jeffery Demps, 10-yard run (Caleb Sturgis kick), 7:27. Tied 20–20.
- FLA – Caleb Sturgis 27-yard field goal, 0:09. Gators 23–20.

=== Mississippi State ===
Quarter	1	2	3	4	Total
#2 Gators	3	10	3	13	29
Bulldogs	3	7	3	6	19

at Davis Wade Stadium, Starkville, Mississippi

- Date: October 24, 2009
- Game time: 7:30 p.m. ET
- Game weather: 60 °F (16 °C) (Clear)
- Game attendance: 57,178
- Referee: Penn Wagers
- TV announcers (ESPN): Brad Nessler (play-by-play), Todd Blackledge (color commentator) & Erin Andrews (sideline reporter)

Scoring Summary
Q	Team	Time	Scoring Play		Extra Point	Score		
Q	Team	Time	Scoring Play		Extra Point	+	FLA	MSU
1	MSU	9:05	FG	Derek DePasquale 43 yd FG		3	0	3
1	FLA	3:36	FG	Caleb Sturgis 21 yd FG		3	3	3
2	FLA	13:16	TD	Tim Tebow, 26 yd run	Caleb Sturgis Kick	7	10	3
2	FLA	7:15	FG	Caleb Sturgis, 21 yd FG		3	13	3
2	MSU	0:27	TD	Johnthan Banks, 100 yd interception return	Derek Depasquale Kick	7	13	10
3	MSU	9:32	FG	Derek Depasquale 31 yd FG		3	13	13
3	FLA	5:15	FG	Caleb Sturgis 27 yd FG		3	16	13
4	FLA	9:08	TD	Chris Rainey 8 yd run	FAILED	6	22	13
4	FLA	8:25	TD	Dustin Doe, 23 yd interception return	Caleb Sturgis Kick	7	29	13
4	MSU	3:51	FG	Johnthan Banks, 20 yd interception return	2PT FAILED	6	29	19

=== Georgia ===
Quarter	1	2	3	4	Total
Bulldogs	0	10	7	0	17
#1 Gators	14	10	7	10	41

at Jacksonville Municipal Stadium, Jacksonville, Florida

- Date: October 31, 2009
- Game time: 3:30 p.m. ET
- Game weather: 84 °F (29 °C) (Partly cloudy)
- Game attendance: 84,604
- Referee: Tom Ritter
- TV announcers (CBS): Verne Lundquist (play–by–play), Gary Danielson (color commentator), Tracy Wolfson (sideline reporter)

Scoring Summary
Q	Team	Time	Scoring Play		Extra Point	Score		
Q	Team	Time	Scoring Play		Extra Point	+	UGA	FLA
1	FLA	12:21	TD	Riley Cooper, 22 yd pass from Tim Tebow	Caleb Sturgis Kick	7	0	7
1	FLA	3:20	TD	Riley Cooper, 29 yd pass from Tim Tebow	Caleb Sturgis Kick	7	0	14
2	UGA	13:45	FG	Blair Walsh 49 yd FG		3	3	14
2	UGA	10:40	TD	Aron White, 26 yd pass from Joe Cox	Blair Walsh Kick	7	10	14
2	FLA	4:47	FG	Caleb Sturgis 56 yd FG		3	10	17
2	FLA	1:32	TD	Tim Tebow, 23 yd run	Caleb Sturgis Kick	7	10	24
3	FLA	13:30	TD	Tim Tebow, 5 yd run	Caleb Sturgis Kick	7	10	31
3	UGA	6:17	TD	Michael Moore, 4 yd pass from Joe Cox	Blair Walsh Kick	7	17	31
4	FLA	7:42	FG	Caleb Sturgis 44 yd FG		3	17	34
4	FLA	6:24	TD	Brandon Spikes, 5 yd interception return	Caleb Sturgis Kick	7	17	41

=== Vanderbilt ===
Quarter	1	2	3	4	Total
Commodores	0	0	3	0	3
#1 Gators	3	10	7	7	27

at Ben Hill Griffin Stadium, Gainesville, Florida

- Date: November 7, 2009
- Game time: 7:15 p.m. ET
- Game weather: 67 °F (19 °C) (Clear)
- Game attendance: 90,694
- Referee: Steve Shaw
- TV: ESPN2

Scoring Summary
Q	Team	Time	Scoring Play		Extra Point	Score		
Q	Team	Time	Scoring Play		Extra Point	+	VAN	FLA
1	FLA	1:00	FG	Caleb Sturgis, 27 yd FG		3	0	3
2	FLA	12:43	TD	Jeffery Demps, 25 yd run	Caleb Sturgis Kick	7	0	10
2	FLA	6:08	FG	Caleb Sturgis 45 yd FG		3	0	13
3	VAN	8:40	FG	Ryan Fowler, 32 yd FG		3	3	13
3	FLA	1:52	TD	Tim Tebow, 1 yd run	Caleb Sturgis Kick	7	3	20
4	FLA	1:32	TD	David Nelson, 8 yd pass from Tim Tebow	Caleb Sturgis Kick	7	3	27

=== South Carolina ===
Quarter	1	2	3	4	Total
#1 Gators	10	7	0	7	24
Gamecocks	7	7	0	0	14

at Williams-Brice Stadium, Columbia, South Carolina

- Date: November 14, 2009
- Game time: 3:30 p.m.
- Game weather: 73 °F (23 °C) (Sunny)
- Game attendance: 79,297
- Referee: Hubert Owens
- TV announcers (CBS): Verne Lundquist (play–by–play), Gary Danielson (color commentator), Tracy Wolfson (sideline reporter)

Scoring Summary
Q	Team	Time	Scoring Play		Extra Point	Score		
Q	Team	Time	Scoring Play		Extra Point	+	FLA	SC
1	FLA	12:04	FG	Riley Cooper, 68 yd pass from Tim Tebow	Caleb Sturgis Kick	7	7	0
1	SC	5:51	TD	Brian Maddox, 1 yd run	Spencer Lanning Kick	7	7	7
1	FLA	1:18	FG	Caleb Sturgis, 32 yd FG		3	10	7
2	FLA	10:28	TD	Emmanuel Moody, 17 yd run	Caleb Sturgis Kick	7	17	7
2	SC	2:10	TD	Weslye Saunders 9 yd pass from Stephen Garcia	Spencer Lanning Kick	7	17	14
3	No scoring in 3rd Quarter							
4	FLA	13:25	TD	Tim Tebow 1 yd run	Caleb Sturgis Kick	7	24	14

=== Florida International ===
Quarter	1	2	3	4	Total
Golden Panthers	0	3	0	0	3
#1 Gators	14	21	14	13	62

at Ben Hill Griffin Stadium, Gainesville, Florida

- Date: November 21, 2009
- Game time: 12:30 p.m. ET
- Game weather: 71 °F (22 °C) (Sunny)
- Game attendance: 90,473
- Referee: Hubert Owens
- TV: PPV

Scoring Summary
Q	Team	Time	Scoring Play		Extra Point	Score		
Q	Team	Time	Scoring Play		Extra Point	+	FIU	FLA
1	FLA	13:10	TD	Brandon Spikes, 41 yd interception return	Caleb Sturgis Kick	7	0	7
1	FLA	9:18	TD	Tim Tebow, 55 yd run	Caleb Sturgis Kick	7	0	14
2	FLA	13:39	TD	Chris Rainey, 27 yd pass from Tim Tebow	Caleb Sturgis Kick	7	0	21
2	FLA	9:41	TD	Chris Rainey, 22 yd run	Caleb Sturgis Kick	7	0	28
2	FLA	1:38	TD	Jeffery Demps, 3 yd run	Caleb Sturgis Kick	7	0	35
2	FIU	0:29	FG	Dustin Rivest 37 yd FG		3	3	35
3	FLA	13:38	TD	Riley Cooper, 18 yd pass from Tim Tebow	Caleb Sturgis Kick	7	3	42
3	FLA	4:06	TD	Omarius Hines 20 yd pass from John Brantley	Caleb Sturgis Kick	7	3	49
4	FLA	11:10	TD	Justin Williams, 16 yd pass from John Brantley	Caleb Sturgis Kick	7	3	56
4	FLA	2:28	TD	Frankie Hammond Jr. 31 yd pass from John Brantley	PAT Blocked	6	3	62

=== Florida State ===
Quarter	1	2	3	4	Total
Seminoles	0	0	3	7	10
#1 Gators	7	17	6	7	37

at Ben Hill Griffin Stadium, Gainesville, Florida

- Date: November 28, 2009
- Game time: 3:30 p.m. ET
- Game weather: 65 °F (18 °C) (Partly cloudy)
- Game attendance: 90,907
- Referee: Matt Austin
- TV announcers (CBS): Verne Lundquist (play–by–play), Gary Danielson (color commentator), Tracy Wolfson (sideline reporter)

Game information

1st Quarter

- FLA – Aaron Hernandez, 18-yard pass from Tim Tebow (Caleb Sturgis kick), 6:48. Gators 7–0.

2nd Quarter

- FLA – Caleb Sturgis, 37-yard field goal, 14:55. Gators 10–0.
- FLA – Tim Tebow, 18-yard run (Caleb Sturgis kick), 3:59. Gators 17–0.
- FLA – Aaron Hernandez, 37-yard pass from Tim Tebow (Caleb Sturgis kick), 1:07. Gators 24–0.

3rd Quarter

- FLA – Riley Cooper, 39-yard pass from Tim Tebow (PAT blocked), 11:27. Gators 30–0.
- FSU – Dustin Hopkins, 20-yard field goal, 0:00. Gators 30–3.

4th Quarter

- FLA – Tim Tebow, 1-yard run (Caleb Sturgis kick), 10:18. Gators 37–3.
- FSU – Jarmon Fortson, 9-yard pass from E. J. Manuel (Dustin Hopkins kick), 8:11. Gators 37–10.

In the regular season finale, the Gators blew by the Seminoles 37–10. A new attendance record at Ben Hill Griffin Stadium was set with 90,907 present.

=== SEC Championship Game vs. Alabama ===
Quarter	1	2	3	4	Total
#1 Gators	3	10	0	0	13
#2 Crimson Tide	9	10	7	6	32

at Georgia Dome, Atlanta

- Date: December 5, 2009
- Game time: 4:00 p.m. ET
- Game weather: None (Domed stadium)
- Game attendance: 75,514
- Referee: Matt Austin
- TV announcers (CBS): Verne Lundquist (play–by–play), Gary Danielson (color commentator), Tracy Wolfson (sideline reporter)

Game information

1st Quarter

- ALA – Leigh Tiffin, 48-yard field goal, 10:37. Crimson Tide 3–0.
- ALA – Mark Ingram II, 7-yard run (PAT failed), 5:33. Crimson Tide 9–0.
- FLA – Caleb Sturgis, 48-yard field goal, 0:28. Crimson Tide 9–3.

2nd Quarter

- ALA – Leigh Tiffin, 34-yard field goal, 6:03. Crimson Tide 12–3.
- FLA – David Nelson, 23-yard pass from Tim Tebow (Caleb Sturgis kick), 4:31. Crimson Tide 12–10.
- ALA – Mark Ingram, 3-yard run (Leigh Tiffin kick), 3:32. Crimson Tide 19–10.
- FLA – Caleb Sturgis 32-yard field goal, 1:18. Crimson Tide 19–13.

3rd Quarter

- ALA – Colin Peek 17-yard pass from Greg McElroy (Leigh Tiffin kick), 9:53. Crimson Tide 26–13.

4th Quarter

- ALA – Mark Ingram 1-yard run (2PT attempt failed), 13:49. Crimson Tide 32–13.

Leading passers

- FLA – Tim Tebow – 20/35, 247 yards, 1 TD, 1 INT
- ALA – Greg McElroy – 12/18, 239 yards, 1 TD

Leading rushers

- FLA – Tim Tebow – 10 rushes, 63 yards
- ALA – Mark Ingram II – 28 rushes, 113 yards, 3 TD

Leading receivers

- FLA – Aaron Hernandez – 8 receptions, 85 yards
- ALA – Marquis Maze – 5 receptions, 96 yards

In a rematch of last year's SEC Championship Game, the Crimson Tide handed the Gators their only loss of the season. Alabama running back Mark Ingram II scored three touchdowns in the 32–13 win.

=== Sugar Bowl vs. Cincinnati ===
Quarter	1	2	3	4	Total
#5 Gators	9	21	14	7	51
#4 Bearcats	0	3	7	14	24

at Louisiana Superdome, New Orleans, Louisiana

- Date: January 1, 2010
- Game time: 8:30 p.m. ET
- Game weather: None (Domed stadium)
- Game attendance: 65, 207
- Referee: Jack Folliard (Pac-10)
- TV announcers (Fox): Thom Brennaman (play–by–play), Brian Billick (color commentator)

== Personnel ==
=== Depth chart ===
(revised 12-2–09)

Defense

S
Will Hill
Dee Finley

FS
Major Wright
Josh Evans

WLB	MLB	SLB
⋅	Brandon Spikes	⋅
Jelani Jenkins	Brandon Beal	⋅

SS
Ahmad Black
Will Hill

CB
Joe Haden
Markihe Anderson

DE	NT	DE
Jermaine Cunningham	Jaye Howard	Carlos Dunlap
William Green	Justin Trattou	Justin Trattou

CB
Janoris Jenkins
Wondy Pierre-Louis

Offense

WR
Riley Cooper
Justin Williams

WR
Deonte Thompson
Frankie Hammond, Jr.

LT	LG	C	RG	RT
Carl Johnson	James Wilson	Maurkice Pouncey	Mike Pouncey	Marcus Gilbert
Matt Patchan	Corey Hobbs	Sam Robey	Maurice Hurt	David Young

TE
Aaron Hernandez
Josh Postell

WR
David Nelson
Omarius Hines

QB
Tim Tebow
John Brantley

Key reserves
KR Chris Rainey
QB Jordan Reed
TB Emmanuel Moody

RB
Jeff Demps
Chris Rainey

Special teams
PK Jonathan Phillips
PK Caleb Sturgis
P Chas Henry
P David Lerner
KR Brandon James
PR Brandon James
H Chas Henry

=== Roster ===
2009 Florida Gators roster
Quarterbacks: 12 John Brantley – (redshirt) Sophomore; 14 Andrew Blaylock – (redshirt) Junior; 15 Tim Tebow – Senior; 16 Jordan Reed – Freshman; Running backs: 3 Chris Rainey – (redshirt) Sophomore; 21 Emmanuel Moody – (redshirt) Junior; 23 Mike Gillislee – Freshman; 29 Christopher Scott – (redshirt) Junior; 37 Vincent Brown – (redshirt) Sophomore; 44 Ean McQuay – (redshirt) Sophomore; 48 Marquis Hannah – (redshirt) Junior; Athlete: 2 Jeff Demps – Sophomore; 25 Brandon James – Senior; Fullbacks: 37 Marcus Nemeth – Freshman; 42 Steven Wilks – (redshirt) Sophomore; 45 T.J. Pridemore – (redshirt) Freshman; 48 Rick Burgess – Senior; Wide receivers: 3 Brandon Frazier – (redshirt) Junior; 4 Andre Debose – (redshirt) Freshman; 6 Deonte Thompson – (redshirt) Sophomore; 7 Justin Williams – (redshirt) Junior; 9 Carl Moore – Senior; 11 Riley Cooper – Senior; 18 T.J. Lawrence – (redshirt) Freshman; 22 Cade Holliday – (redshirt) Senior; 39 Joey Sorrentino – (redshirt) Senior; 82 Omarius Hines – (redshirt) Freshman; 83 David Nelson – (redshirt) Senior; 85 Frankie Hammond Jr. – (redshirt) Freshman; 89 Stephen Alli – Freshman; Tight ends: 80 Desmond Parks – Freshman; 81 Aaron Hernandez – Junior; 84 Christopher Coleman – (redshirt) Senior; 87 Josh Postell – (redshirt) Freshman	Offensive line: 50 Sam Robey – (redshirt) Freshman; 55 Mike Pouncey – Junior; 56 Maurkice Pouncey – Junior; 57 Carl Johnson – (redshirt) Junior; 58 Nick Alajajian – Freshman; 58 Christopher Guido – Freshman; 60 William Steinmann – Sophomore; 61 Gary Beemer – (redshirt) Junior; 62 Hayden Chance – Freshamn; 63 Cole Gilliam – Freshman; 64 Kyle Koehne – Freshman; 66 James Wilson – (redshirt) Sophomore; 67 Jon Halapio – Freshman; 70 Shawn Schmieder – (redshirt) Junior; 71 Matt Patchan – Sophomore; 72 Jonotthan Harrison – Freshman; 73 Xavier Nixon – Freshman; 74 Maurice Hurt – (redshirt) Junior; 76 Marcus Gilbert – (redshirt) Junior; 78 David Young – (redshirt) Freshman; 79 Corey Hobbs – (redshirt) Junior; Defensive line: 6 Jaye Howard – (redshirt) Sophomore; 8 Carlos Dunlap – Junior; 34 Lerentee McCray – Sophomore; 44 Duke Lemmens – Junior; 47 Brandon Antwine – (redshirt) Junior; 49 Jermaine Cunningham – Senior; 57 Samuel Johnson – (redshirt) Freshman; 62 Lamar Abel – (redshirt) Sophomore; 65 Glen Watson – (redshirt) Freshman; 90 Lawrence Marsh – (redshirt) Junior; 91 Earl Okine – (redshirt) Freshman; 93 Kedric Johnson – Freshman; 94 Justin Trattou – Junior; 95 Gary Brown – Freshman; 96 William Green – Sophomore; 97 Edwin Herbert – Junior; 98 Troy Epps – Senior; 99 Omar Hunter – (redshirt) Freshman	Linebackers: 16 A.J. Jones – (redshirt) Junior; 26 Lorenzo Edwards – Junior; 30 Chris Pintano – (redshirt) Junior; 32 Dustin Doe – Senior; 33 Scott Peek – (redshirt) Freshman; 40 Brandon Hicks – Junior; 41 Ryan Stamper – (redshirt) Senior; 43 Jelani Jenkins – Freshman; 46 Michael Ross – (redshirt) Freshman; 51 Brandon Spikes – Senior; 52 Jon Bostic – Freshman; 54 Brandon Beal – Sophomore; Defensive backs: 23 Corey Henderson – (redshirt) Sophomore; 24 Josh Evans – Freshman; 34 Reginald Hopkins – (redshirt) Sophomore; 42 Miguel Carodine – (redshirt) Junior; Cornerbacks: 1 Janoris Jenkins – Sophomore; 4 Wondy Pierre-Louis – Senior; 5 Joe Haden – Junior; 14 Markihe Anderson – Senior; 27 Adrian Bushell – (redshirt) Freshman; 28 Jeremy Brown – Freshman; 36 Moses Jenkins – Junior	Safeties: 10 Will Hill – Sophomore; 13 Dee Finley – Freshman; 20 Dorian Munroe – (redshirt) Senior; 21 Major Wright – Junior; 35 Ahmad Black – Junior; 46 Cody Worton – (redshirt) Junior; Punters: 17 Chas Henry – Junior; 40 David Lerner – (redshirt) Freshman; Kickers: 19 Caleb Sturgis – Sophomore; 38 Jonathan Phillips – (redshirt) Senior; Long snappers: 47 John Crofoot – Freshman; 50 Cody Hampton – (redshirt) Freshman; 53 Mike Williamson – (redshirt) Senior; 58 Christopher Guido – Freshman; 59 John Fairbanks – (redshirt) Junior

=== Coaching staff ===
2009 Florida Gators coaching staff

Head Coach: Urban Meyer

Offensive coaches

- Assistant head coach/offensive coordinator/offensive line: Steve Addazio
- Quarterbacks: Scot Loeffler
- Running backs: Kenny Carter
- Wide receivers/recruiting coordinator: Billy Gonzales
- Tight ends: Brian White

Defensive coaches

- Associate head coach/defensive coordinator/linebackers: Charlie Strong
- Assistant defensive coordinator/safeties: Chuck Heater
- Assistant head coach/defensive line: Dan McCarney
- Cornerbacks: Vance Bedford

== Statistics ==
=== Team ===
	Gators	Opponents
Scoring	502	174
Points per game	35.9	12.4
First downs	314	208
Rushing	158	84
Passing	142	103
Penalty	14	21
Total offense	6410	3536
Avg per play	7.0	4.2
Avg per game	457.9	252.6
Fumbles–Lost	17–11	19–3
Penalties–Yards	95–735	78–638
Avg per game	52.5	45.6

	Gators	Opponents
Punts–Yards	34–1,476	81–3,253
Avg per punt	43.4	40.2
Time of possession/Game	30:45	29:15
3rd down conversions	87/177	58/194
4th down conversions	11/17	11/22
Touchdowns scored	63	18
Field goals–Attempts	22–31	17–21
PAT–Attempts	58–63	15–16
Total attendance	634,446	300,615
Games/Avg per game	7/90,635	7/75,131

=== Scores by quarter ===
Quarter	1	2	3	4	Total
Opponents	25	63	22	27	137
Gators	112	164	87	91	454

=== Offense ===
==== Rushing ====
Name	CAR	YDS	YPC	Long	TD
Tebow	217	910	4.2	55	14
Demps	99	745	7.5	62	7
Rainey	89	575	6.5	76	5
Moody	58	378	6.5	32	3
Gillislee	31	267	8.6	52	1
James	20	109	5.4	25	0
Brantley	13	67	5.2	23	0
Scott	9	26	2.9	13	0
Hernandez	1	16	16.0	16	0
Cooper	1	14	14.0	14	0
Blaylock	4	6	1.5	9	0
Brown	3	1	0.3	2	0
Thompson	1	-2	-2.0	0	0
Total	555	3,105	5.6	76	30
Opponents	449	1,397	3.1	42	6

==== Passing ====
Name	GP-GS	Cmp-Att-Int	Pct	Yds	TD
Tebow	14–14	213-314-5	67.8%	2,895	21
Brantley	7–0	36–48–0	75%	410	7
Cooper	14–0	0-1-0	0%	0	0
Total		249-364-5	68.4%	3,305	28
Opponents		208-396-20	52.5%	2,139	10

==== Receiving ====
Name	REC	YDS	YPR	Long	TD
Hernandez	68	850	12.5	64	5
Cooper	51	961	18.8	80	9
Nelson	25	291	11.6	30	2
Thompson	24	343	14.3	77	4
James	24	215	9.0	32	1
Hines	14	172	12.3	25	1
Rainey	10	161	16.1	33	1
Demps	8	52	6.5	11	0
Moody	8	45	5.6	18	0
Holliday	6	102	17.0	33	1
Williams	6	50	8.3	16	2
Hammond	4	57	14.2	31	1
Gillislee	1	6	6.0	6	1
Total	249	3,305	13.3	80	28
Opponents	208	2,139	10.3	75	10

== Players drafted into the NFL ==
Round	Pick	Player	Position	NFL club
1	7	Joe Haden	CB	Cleveland Browns
1	18	Maurkice Pouncey	C	Pittsburgh Steelers
1	25	Tim Tebow	QB	Denver Broncos
2	53	Jermaine Cunningham	DE	New England Patriots
2	54	Carlos Dunlap	DE	Cincinnati Bengals
2	62	Brandon Spikes	LB	New England Patriots
3	75	Major Wright	S	Chicago Bears
4	113	Aaron Hernandez	TE	New England Patriots
5	159	Riley Cooper	WR	Philadelphia Eagles
