= 2010 Sugar Bowl =

2010 Allstate Sugar Bowl
- BCS Bowl Game; 76th Sugar Bowl
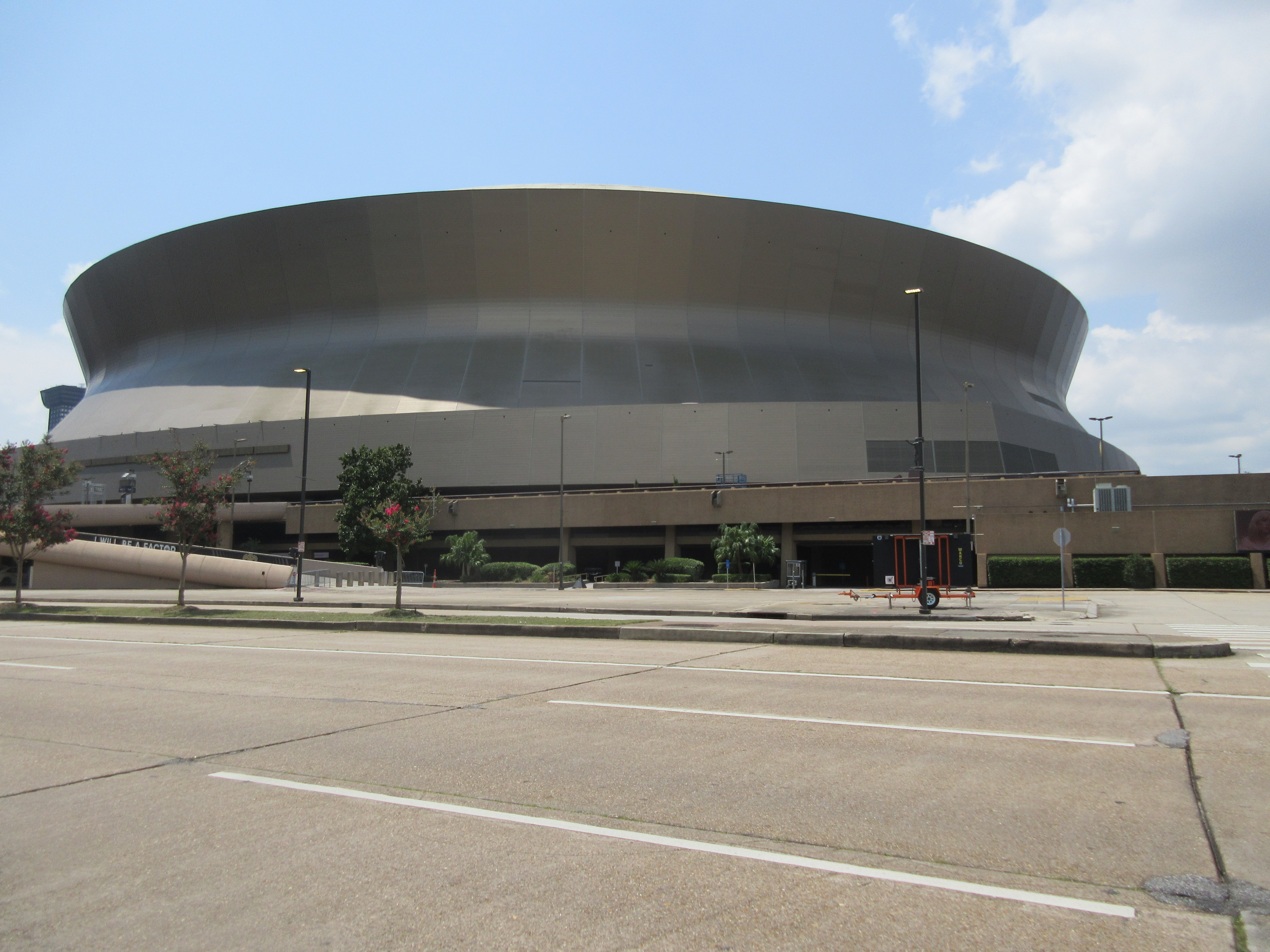
- The Louisiana Superdome in New Orleans, Louisiana, hosted the Sugar Bowl.
Cincinnati Bearcats	Florida Gators
(12–0)	(12–1)
Big East	SEC
24	51
Head coach: Jeff Quinn (interim)	Head coach: Urban Meyer
AP / Coaches / BCS; 4 / 4 / 3	AP / Coaches / BCS; 5 / 5 / 5
	1	2	3	4	Total
Cincinnati	0	3	7	14	24
Florida	9	21	14	7	51
- Date: January 1, 2010
- Season: 2009
- Stadium: Louisiana Superdome
- Location: New Orleans, Louisiana
- MVP: Tim Tebow - Florida QB
- Favorite: Florida by 12½
- National anthem: Lady Antebellum
- Referee: Jack Folliard (Pac-10)
- Halftime show: Pride of the Sunshine (Florida band); University of Cincinnati Marching Band
- Attendance: 65,207
- Payout: US$18 million

United States TV coverage
- Network: FOX
- Announcers: Thom Brennaman (play-by-play); Brian Billick (color)
- Nielsen ratings: 8.5 (15.5 million)

The 2010 Allstate Sugar Bowl was an American college football bowl game that was part of the Bowl Championship Series (BCS) for the 2009 NCAA Division I FBS football season and was the 76th Sugar Bowl. The Florida Gators defeated the Cincinnati Bearcats 51–24 behind a record-setting performance by senior quarterback Tim Tebow.

== Background ==
The contest was played on Friday, January 1, 2010, in the Louisiana Superdome in New Orleans, Louisiana between the Florida Gators, who had been undefeated on the season until losing to #2 Alabama in the SEC Championship Game and the Cincinnati Bearcats, winners of the Big East Conference. The Bearcats were coached by Offensive coordinator Jeff Quinn on an interim basis after Head Coach Brian Kelly left Cincinnati to take the head coaching position at Notre Dame on December 10, 2009. This would be Quinn's only game as head coach for Cincinnati, as he had already accepted the head coaching position of the University of Buffalo's football team effective after the Sugar Bowl.

This was Florida's eighth trip to the Sugar Bowl, having gone 2–5 in their previous seven appearances, the last being a 37–20 loss to Miami in 2001. For Cincinnati, this was their first appearance in the Sugar Bowl and their second in a BCS bowl game. The teams had met only once before - in 1984, when the Gators defeated the Bearcats 48–17 at Florida Field. Florida's head coach Urban Meyer played college football at Cincinnati and was a member of that 1984 Cincinnati team.

=== Meyer's leave of absence ===
Several days before the game, Florida head coach Urban Meyer announced that he would take an indefinite leave of absence after the Sugar Bowl due to health and family reasons, leading to much speculation about his future at Florida. In the post-game press conference, however, Meyer said that he "planned to be the coach of the Gators", and after spending more time with his family over the following weeks, he resumed his duties as Florida's head coach.

== Game result ==
Florida quarterback Tim Tebow led the Gators to a 30–3 halftime lead and a 51–24 victory. Florida's offense set several Sugar Bowl records in the contest that still stand as of the 2018 edition. The Gators' 659 total yards were the most in Sugar Bowl history, and Tim Tebow set Sugar Bowl and Bowl Championship Series records with 482 passing yards and 533 total yards. Tebow's 320 first half passing yards also set a Sugar Bowl record, as did his 12 consecutive completions to start the game. Cincinnati wide receiver and returner Mardy Gilyard also broke Sugar Bowl records for return yards in the game.

== Scoring summary ==
Scoring Play	Score
1st Quarter
FLA — Tim Tebow 7-yard pass to Aaron Hernandez (Caleb Sturgis kick blocked), 6:13	FLA 6–0
FLA — Caleb Sturgis 40-yard field goal, 1:20	FLA 9–0
2nd Quarter
FLA — Tim Tebow 7-yard pass to Deonte Thompson (Caleb Sturgis kick), 9:07	FLA 16–0
FLA — Emmanuel Moody 6-yard run (Caleb Sturgis kick), 7:05	FLA 23–0
CIN — Jake Rogers 47-yard field goal, 3:11	FLA 23–3
FLA — Tim Tebow 80-yard pass to Riley Cooper (Caleb Sturgis kick), 3:02	FLA 30–3
3rd Quarter
FLA — Emmanuel Moody 2-yard run (Caleb Sturgis kick), 11:13	FLA 37–3
CIN — Marcus Waugh 2-yard pass from Tony Pike (Jake Rogers kick), 4:46	FLA 37–10
FLA — Tim Tebow 4-yard rush (Caleb Sturgis kick), 2:06	FLA 44–10
4th Quarter
CIN — Armon Binns 3-yard pass from Tony Pike (Jake Rogers kick), 10:07	FLA 44–17
FLA — Chris Rainey 6-yard rush (Caleb Sturgis kick), 7:05	FLA 51–17
CIN — Kazeem Alli 6-yard pass from Tony Pike (Jake Rogers kick), 3:43	FLA 51–24
