= Florida–LSU football rivalry =

American college football rivalry

- Florida Gators LSU Tigers
- First meeting: September 25, 1937; LSU, 19–0
- Latest meeting: September 13, 2025; LSU, 20–10
- Next meeting: 2027

Statistics
- Total meetings: 72
- All-time series: Florida leads, 34–32–3 (3 LSU wins vacated)
- Largest victory: Florida, 58–3 (1993)
- Longest win streak: Florida, 9 (1988–1996)
- Current win streak: LSU, 1 (2025–present)

Locations of UF and LSU

The Florida–LSU football rivalry is an American college football rivalry between the Florida Gators football team of the University of Florida and LSU Tigers football team of Louisiana State University. Although both universities were founding members of the Southeastern Conference (SEC) in December 1932, the Gators and Tigers did not meet on the gridiron until 1937 and met relatively infrequently until becoming annual opponents in 1971. When the SEC instituted divisional play in 1992, Florida was placed in the SEC Eastern Division and LSU in the Western Division, and Florida and LSU were selected as permanent cross-division rivals, and they rivalry remained an annual affair through several league changes until another revision to the expanded SEC's scheduling practices interrupted the series after the 2025 meeting. The Gators and Tigers have combined to win four national championships and five SEC titles over the past two decades.

== Series trends and results ==
Florida and LSU were charter members of the SEC when the conference was established in 1932 but only met twice on the gridiron over the subsequent two decades. The Gators and Tigers played much more regularly through the 1950s and 1960s and met annually in 55 consecutive seasons from 1971–2025.

Florida leads the tally 34–32–3, with 3 LSU wins vacated. Though each school has enjoyed periods of dominance, the rivalry has been remarkably evenly matched over the long term.

LSU led 21–17–3 when the SEC split into eastern and western divisions for the 1992 season. Though the Tigers and Gators were placed in opposite divisions, the conference preserved the rivalry as an annual cross-division matchup, and Florida won eight of the next nine meetings under head coach Steve Spurrier. LSU became much more competitive in the series and in general under head coach Les Miles, and the two schools combined to win four national championships in six seasons from 2003 through 2008.

The Gators hold the longest win streak in the rivalry with nine straight victories from 1988 to 1996, while LSU established their longest series streak in 2023 by winning their fifth straight.

=== Game results ===
Florida victories	LSU victories	Tie games	Vacated wins

No.	Date	Location	Winning team		Losing team	
1	September 25, 1937	Baton Rouge, LA	LSU	19	Florida	0
2	October 25, 1941	Baton Rouge, LA	LSU	10	Florida	7
3	October 24, 1953	Gainesville, FL	Tie	21	Tie	21
4	October 23, 1954	Baton Rouge, LA	LSU	20	#18 Florida	7
5	October 15, 1955	Gainesville, FL	Florida	18	LSU	14
6	October 27, 1956	Baton Rouge, LA	Florida	21	LSU	6
7	October 26, 1957	Gainesville, FL	Florida	22	#10 LSU	14
8	October 25, 1958	Baton Rouge, LA	#3 LSU	10	Florida	7
9	October 24, 1959	Gainesville, FL	#1 LSU	9	Florida	0
10	October 22, 1960	Baton Rouge, LA	Florida	13	LSU	10
11	October 28, 1961	Gainesville, FL	#7 LSU	23	Florida	20
12	October 27, 1962	Baton Rouge, LA	#6 LSU	23	Florida	13
13	October 26, 1963	Gainesville, FL	LSU	14	Florida	0
14	December 5, 1964	Baton Rouge, LA	Florida	20	#7 LSU	6
15	October 2, 1965	Gainesville, FL	Florida	14	#5 LSU	7
16	October 22, 1966	Baton Rouge, LA	#8 Florida	28	LSU	7
17	October 7, 1967	Gainesville, FL	LSU	37	Florida	6
18	October 9, 1971	Baton Rouge, LA	#16 LSU	48	Florida	7
19	October 25, 1972	Gainesville, FL	Tie	3	Tie	3
20	October 6, 1973	Baton Rouge, LA	#10 LSU	24	Florida	3
21	October 5, 1974	Gainesville, FL	#13 Florida	24	LSU	14
22	October 4, 1975	Baton Rouge, LA	#20 Florida	34	LSU	6
23	October 2, 1976	Gainesville, FL	#19 Florida	28	#11 LSU	23
24	October 1, 1977	Baton Rouge, LA	LSU	36	#9 Florida	14
25	October 7, 1978	Gainesville, FL	#11 LSU	34	Florida	21
26	October 6, 1979	Baton Rouge, LA	#17 LSU	20	Florida	3
27	October 4, 1980	Gainesville, FL	LSU	24	#19 Florida	7
28	October 3, 1981	Baton Rouge, LA	Florida	24	LSU	10
29	October 2, 1982	Gainesville, FL	LSU	24	#4 Florida	13
30	October 1, 1983	Baton Rouge, LA	#12 Florida	31	#16 LSU	17
31	September 8, 1984	Gainesville, FL	Tie	21	Tie	21
32	October 5, 1985	Baton Rouge, LA	#11 Florida	20	#8 LSU	0
33	October 4, 1986	Gainesville, FL	#18 LSU	28	Florida	17
34	October 3, 1987	Baton Rouge, LA	#7 LSU	13	#19 Florida	10
35	October 1, 1988	Gainesville, FL	#17 Florida	19	#14 LSU	6
36	October 7, 1989	Baton Rouge, LA	Florida	16	LSU	13
37	October 6, 1990	Gainesville, FL	#10 Florida	34	LSU	8

No.	Date	Location	Winning team		Losing team	
38	October 5, 1991	Baton Rouge, LA	#13 Florida	16	LSU	0
39	October 10, 1992	Gainesville, FL	#23 Florida	28	LSU	21
40	October 9, 1993	Baton Rouge, LA	#5 Florida	58	LSU	3
41	October 8, 1994	Gainesville, FL	#1 Florida	42	LSU	18
42	October 7, 1995	Baton Rouge, LA	#3 Florida	28	#21 LSU	10
43	October 12, 1996	Gainesville, FL	#1 Florida	56	#12 LSU	13
44	October 11, 1997	Baton Rouge, LA	#14 LSU	28	#1 Florida	21
45	October 10, 1998	Gainesville, FL	#6 Florida	22	#11 LSU	10
46	October 9, 1999	Baton Rouge, LA	#8 Florida	31	LSU	10
47	October 7, 2000	Gainesville, FL	#12 Florida	41	LSU	9
48	October 6, 2001	Baton Rouge, LA	#2 Florida	44	#18 LSU	15
49	October 12, 2002	Gainesville, FL	#18 LSU	36	#16 Florida	7
50	October 11, 2003	Baton Rouge, LA	Florida	19	#6 LSU	7
51	October 9, 2004	Gainesville, FL	#24 LSU	24	#12 Florida	21
52	October 15, 2005	Baton Rouge, LA	#10 LSU	21	#11 Florida	17
53	October 7, 2006	Gainesville, FL	#5 Florida	23	#9 LSU	10
54	October 6, 2007	Baton Rouge, LA	#1 LSU	28	#9 Florida	24
55	October 11, 2008	Gainesville, FL	#11 Florida	51	#4 LSU	21
56	October 10, 2009	Baton Rouge, LA	#1 Florida	13	#4 LSU	3
57	October 9, 2010	Gainesville, FL	#12 LSU	33	#14 Florida	29
58	October 8, 2011	Baton Rouge, LA	#1 LSU	41	#17 Florida	11
59	October 6, 2012	Gainesville, FL	#12 Florida	14	#3 LSU	6
60	October 12, 2013	Baton Rouge, LA	#10 LSU^{*}	17	#17 Florida	6
61	October 11, 2014	Gainesville, FL	LSU^{*}	30	Florida	27
62	October 17, 2015	Baton Rouge, LA	#6 LSU^{*}	35	#8 Florida	28
63	November 19, 2016†	Baton Rouge, LA	#21 Florida	16	#16 LSU	10
64	October 7, 2017	Gainesville, FL	LSU	17	#21 Florida	16
65	October 6, 2018	Gainesville, FL	#22 Florida	27	#5 LSU	19
66	October 12, 2019	Baton Rouge, LA	#5 LSU	42	#7 Florida	28
67	December 12, 2020	Gainesville, FL	LSU	37	#6 Florida	34
68	October 16, 2021	Baton Rouge, LA	LSU	49	#20 Florida	42
69	October 15, 2022	Gainesville, FL	LSU	45	Florida	35
70	November 11, 2023	Baton Rouge, LA	#18 LSU	52	Florida	35
71	November 16, 2024	Gainesville, FL	Florida	27	#22 LSU	16
72	September 13, 2025	Baton Rouge, LA	#3 LSU	20	Florida	10
Series: Florida leads 34–32–3
* 2013–2015 LSU wins were vacated by NCAA. † Game postponed and moved to Baton Rouge, due to Hurricane Matthew

== Notable games ==
=== 1937: First meeting ===
The first game in the series was a 19–0 victory for LSU at Tiger Stadium on September 25, 1937. It was the opening game of the season and played in front of a crowd of 15,000. LSU was the defending SEC champion, while Florida was coming off a 4–6 season in 1936. Both teams were coached by men who were later inducted into the College Football Hall of Fame: Bernie Moore for LSU and Josh Cody for Florida. Tigers sophomore quarterback Young Bussey provided most of the team's offense, scoring two touchdowns and kicking the only successful extra point. One of LSU's three pass completions in the game was a 40-yard strike from Bussey to future Hall of Fame end Ken Kavanaugh that put them at the Florida 2-yard line. Two other pass attempts were intercepted by Florida's Walter "Tiger" Mayberry, a star on both offense and defense. LSU out-gained Florida in rushing yards 273–51, passing yards 73–0 (Florida attempted only one pass in the game, which fell incomplete), and converted 18 first downs to Florida's 3.

=== 1960: Wristband robbery ===
The Tigers were favored in 1960 in Baton Rouge. On the first play from scrimmage, Florida quarterback Larry Libertore ran for a 66-yard touchdown. Throughout the rest of the first half, Florida's offense stalled and LSU quarterback Jimmy Field effectively moved the ball, using plays from his wristband. But in the second quarter, with LSU up 10–7, the Gators sent a nine-man blitz against Field. He never saw it coming, and a sea of Gators piled on top of him. When he came out of the mass of bodies, his play-calling wristband was gone. The Gators then held Field to just 12 yards passing in the second half, with a lone first down. The Gators came back to win 13–10, Billy Cash kicking two field goals, and after the game a Gator coach gave the wristband to an official, saying one of his players had found it on the field.

=== 1964: Hurricane delay I ===
During the buildup to the 1964 game in Baton Rouge, LSU was a Sugar Bowl favorite. Florida, though unranked, was led by an up-and-coming young player (and future Heisman Trophy winner) named Steve Spurrier. Then, after being delayed several weeks to the season finale due to Hurricane Hilda, the game ended up being anticlimactic with the Gators rolling to a 20–6 win over the No. 7 Tigers. Particularly noteworthy is the fact that it was Spurrier's first win over LSU – the first of a long win streak that he would have over the Tigers as a player and head coach.

=== 1989: College football's first "overtime" game ===
This game was jokingly referred to as an "overtime" game in Steve Harvey's nationally syndicated "Bottom Ten" column. After LSU hit a field goal to tie it at 13 with 1:19 left, Florida drove from their 20 to LSU's 27. Emmitt Smith was tackled at the LSU 24 inbounds with 18 seconds left. Florida scrambled to get back to the line of scrimmage to snap the ball, which they did with 3 seconds left. Kyle Morris managed to throw it out of bounds with 1 second left, but the clock still ran out, almost exactly like what happened at the end of the 2009 Big 12 Championship Game between #3 Texas and #22 Nebraska. Fireworks were set off over Tiger Stadium in celebration for holding off a late Gator comeback, even though it was right as Florida was sending its special teams unit onto the field. The second was added back to the clock, allowing Arden Czyzewski to attempt, and hit, a 41-yard field goal as time expired to win it 16–13. The unexpected setback sent LSU into a losing streak and its first losing season since they went 4–7 as well in 1983. The manner in which LSU lost the game helped push them into the top spot of that week's Bottom Ten.

=== 1997: LSU's revenge ===
The previous season, the Gators won the national championship and thrashed LSU 56–13, and they came into the game favored. But it was LSU who jumped out to a big early lead, scoring two touchdowns in the first 8 minutes on runs by Herb Tyler and Tommy Banks. The Gators came right back with two touchdown runs by Fred Taylor, each of which capped off an 80-yard drive.

Then, Doug Johnson threw an ill-advised pass, and Cedric Donaldson picked it off and returned it for a touchdown to give LSU a 21–14 lead. The Gators' frustration mounted when another Johnson pass was picked off, this time by Mark Roman, and when Herb Tyler scored another touchdown to give LSU a 28–14 lead with 11:40 to go, the Gators appeared to be in big trouble.

Undaunted, Johnson responded with a 13-play, 78-yard drive that ended with Fred Taylor getting into the end zone to make it 28–21. LSU did nothing with their next possession, and Doug Johnson began moving the ball downfield again. He then faced a rush on a third and two and threw up a Hail Mary which was intercepted by Raion Hill. The Tigers held on for the 28–21 upset. Kevin Faulk appeared on the next week's cover of Sports Illustrated.

=== 2003: LSU's only loss ===
The beleaguered Gators, under second year coach Ron Zook, took on #6 LSU and coach Nick Saban with freshman Chris Leak making his third start at quarterback for Florida.

The Gators were off to their worst start since 1979, with a 3–3 record to begin the year. The previous week, Florida lost to Ole Miss at home and Zook was already on the hot seat. However, Leak would help the Gators turn their season around. He shrugged off six sacks, the Tiger Stadium noise and a pressing defense to lead the Gators to a 19–7 victory over LSU with two separate touchdown passes to running backs Ran Carthon and Ciatrick Fason out of the backfield. Florida also got a massive game out of their defense, including cornerback Keiwan Ratliff, who had two interceptions and shut LSU down. This shocking loss in Death Valley would be the Tigers' only defeat of the season, as Saban would go on to win his first BCS National Championship and his only title with LSU.

=== 2006: Tebow's series debut ===
The 9th ranked Tigers visited the 5th ranked eventual national champion Gators favored by a point and a half. Early in the first quarter, JaMarcus Russell connected with Jacob Hester for a touchdown.

However, Florida's freshman quarterback Tim Tebow would help the Gators turn the tide. While the Gators' starting QB was senior Chris Leak, coach Urban Meyer had been rotating Tebow, a highly touted recruit, into the huddle for a few series every game. Tebow made the most of his opportunities against LSU, accounting for three touchdowns, including his first career passing touchdown on "the jump pass" to tight end Tate Casey. The Gators won 23–10 and went on to win the BCS National Championship.

=== 2007: 5-for-5 on 4th down ===
The 9th-ranked defending national champion Gators traveled to Baton Rouge to take on the top-ranked eventual national champion Tigers. During the week, an LSU fan put out Tim Tebow’s cell phone number, and he got thousands of threatening messages from LSU fans prior to the game. Early on, it appeared that Florida was heading for a big win when they raced out to a 10–0 lead. After scoring the touchdown, Tebow mocked the LSU crowd by mimicking a phone call. The two teams then traded scores, scoring two touchdowns each to make it 24–14 late in the third quarter.

LSU rallied behind Matt Flynn to score a touchdown to cut it to 24–21. Then they stopped Tebow and got the ball back with just a few minutes left. They faced a fourth and two in their own territory, and got the first down. Not even a minute later, they faced another fourth and two and again converted.

From the Florida 12-yard line, once again, the Tigers faced a fourth and 1. But rather than kick the game-tying field goal, Les Miles ordered a dive play. And for the fifth time in the game, the Tigers converted. LSU took the lead when running back Jacob Hester scored a TD with 1:09 left and hung on for a 28–24 win. The Tigers, though they would finish the season with two losses, went on to win the BCS National Championship.

=== 2010: The fake field goal ===
In a back-and-forth game, LSU pulled ahead 26–14 early in the 4th quarter. But Andre Debose answered with a kickoff return for a touchdown, and following a defensive stand by the Gators, Florida got the ball with 7 minutes left and trailing 26–21. A long drive ended when running back Mike Gillislee ran into the end zone with three minutes left. Quarterback John Brantley completed the two-point conversion to Omarius Hines to increase the Gator lead to 29–26 with just under 3 minutes left.

LSU's Jarrett Lee then led a drive that found LSU at the Gator 36-yard line with 34 seconds to go. LSU coach Les Miles ordered a 53-yard field goal attempt by Josh Jasper. Holder Derek Helton blindly pitched the ball over his head on a fake field goal. It hit the ground, but took a perfect bounce right into the arms of Jasper, who picked it up and crossed the first down line.

Lee then threw a 28-yard pass to Terrence Toliver to the Florida 3-yard line with 18 seconds left. After spiking the ball, then an incomplete pass, Lee tossed the game winner to Toliver with 6 seconds left; LSU won 33–29.

=== 2016: Hurricane delay II ===
This game was originally scheduled to be played in Gainesville on October 8, but due to Hurricane Matthew, the game was canceled. After much deliberation between Florida Athletic Director Jeremy Foley, LSU Athletic Director Joe Alleva and SEC Commissioner Greg Sankey, both schools agreed to play the game on November 19 in Baton Rouge, with Florida hosting the 2017 (originally scheduled to play in Baton Rouge) and 2018 matchups in Gainesville.

The first half was a defensive battle, with LSU leading 7–3. The Tigers drove the ball inside the Florida 5-yard line to start the second half but came away with zero points after a fumbled snap on a short field goal attempt resulted in a desperation throw by the holder that fell incomplete in the end zone. The Gators immediately took advantage of that LSU miscue on the very next play by scoring a 98-yard touchdown pass on first down from graduate transfer quarterback Austin Appleby to freshman receiver Tyrie Cleveland, who shook off an LSU defender while speeding to the end zone to take a 10–7 lead. After an exchange of punts, LSU scored a field goal to tie the game at 10. Florida kicker Eddy Piñeiro then made a pair of field goals to give the Gators a 16–10 lead late in the fourth quarter, the second field goal being set up by an LSU lost fumble on a kickoff return.

After driving down the field with less than a minute left, LSU had first-and-goal at UF's 6-yard line with 38 seconds left. The Tigers picked up 5 yards on the first two plays, both handoffs to running back Derrius Guice but were stuffed at the 1-yard line on third-and-goal on a full back handoff. With its final timeout, LSU stopped the clock with 3 seconds left. On the final play of the game, LSU lined up in the goal-line formation. From the snap, the play looked broken, with transfer quarterback Danny Etling spinning to the right on what appeared to be a handoff. However, running back Derrius Guice was late off of the snap, forcing Etling to pitch the ball backwards to the 6-yard line. Guice attempted to find a hole, starting to run right but cutting back left and diving through the air from the two yard line, but was met by Gators defensive back Marcell Harris and defensive linemen Cece Jefferson and Jordan Sherit, who wrapped up his legs, stopping him at the goal line. While coming down, Guice fumbled the ball but it was recovered by Gators cornerback Quincy Wilson at the half yard line. Florida players and staff stormed the field in celebration after pulling off what would be considered the biggest upset of its season. Linebacker Rayshad Jackson and wide receiver Antonio Callaway celebrated by running through the end zone with a Gator flag in hand. Florida head coach Jim McElwain became the first coach in conference history to lead his team to the conference championship game in his first two seasons.

=== 2020: Shoe throw ===
Florida, ranked No. 6 and 8–1, faced an unranked 3–5 LSU team at home in a game that had been postponed due to a COVID-19 outbreak on the Gators football team. The game was expected to be a blowout win for Florida, favored by more than three touchdowns. However, the game would end up being close throughout. Tied at 34 near the end of the fourth quarter and with the fog becoming extremely thick in The Swamp, Florida stopped LSU on third down. Before the Tigers could punt the ball, however, as Kole Taylor's shoe came off, Florida cornerback Marco Wilson proceeded to grab it and throw it twenty yards downfield. This resulted in an unsportsmanlike conduct penalty, giving LSU a first down to keep their drive alive. Cade York hit a career-long 57-yard field goal to give LSU a 37–34 lead with 23 seconds left. Florida had a chance to force overtime in the final seconds, but Evan McPherson's 51-yard field goal attempt sailed wide left to seal LSU's upset of the Gators, effectively ending their chances at the College Football Playoff. Wilson was heavily criticized online.

== See also ==
- List of NCAA college football rivalry games
