= List of Cincinnati Bearcats football seasons =

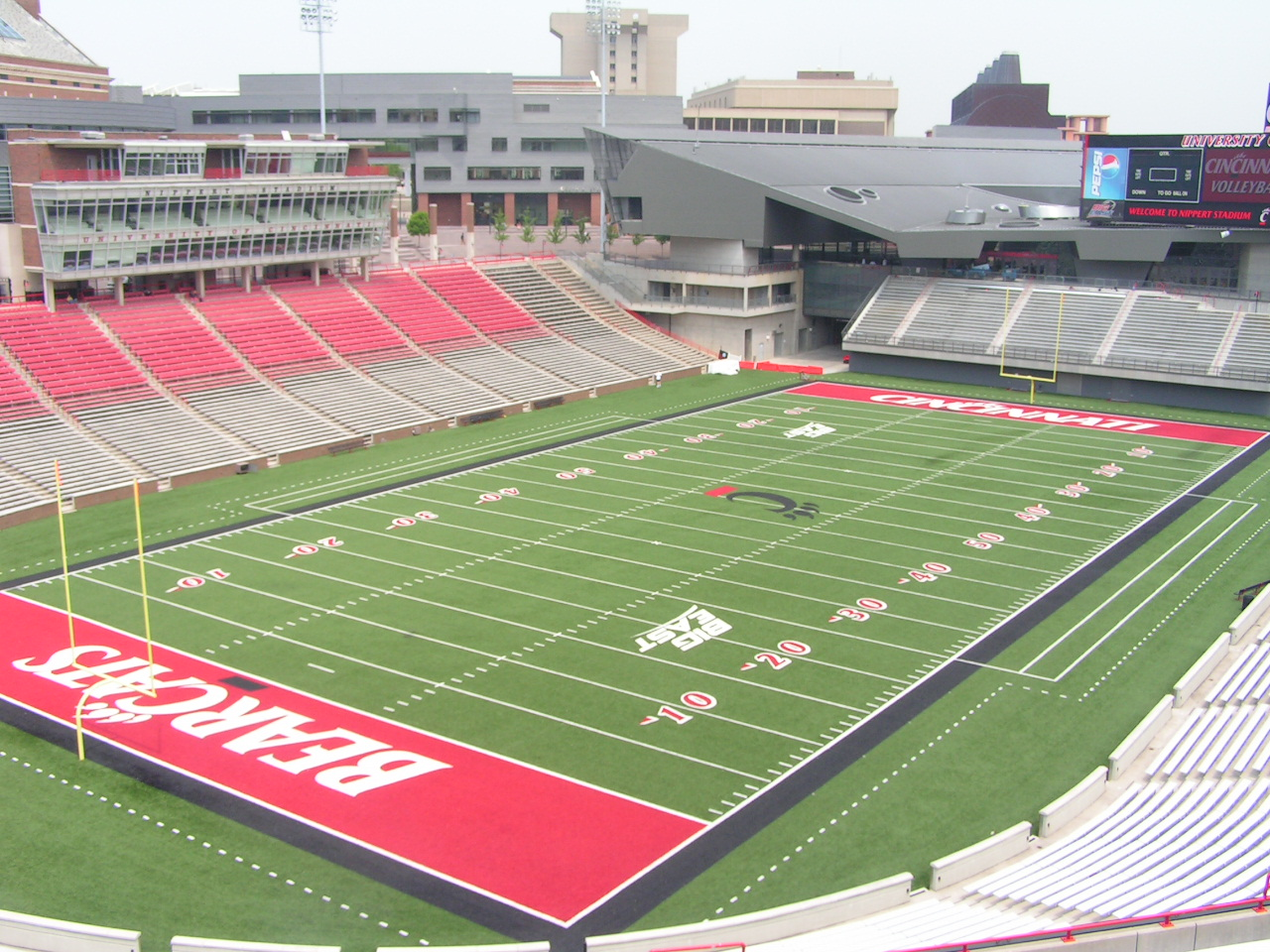
The Bearcats have played at Nippert Stadium since 1924.

This is a list of seasons completed by the Cincinnati Bearcats football team of the National Collegiate Athletic Association (NCAA) Division I Football Bowl Subdivision (FBS). Since the team's creation in 1885, the Bearcats have participated in more than 1,200 officially sanctioned games, including 16 bowl games.

The Bearcats have been a member of numerous athletic conferences. From 1910 through 1924, the Bearcats was a member of the Ohio Athletic Conference. In 1925, the team joined the defunct Buckeye Intercollegiate Athletic Association, where it won 2 conference championships. From 1947 to 1952, the Bearcats was a member of the Mid-American Conference. From 1957 though 1969, Cincinnati competed in the Missouri Valley Conference, where it won two conference championships. As one of the founding members, the Bearcats competed in Conference USA from 1995 through 2004. In 2005, Cincinnati joined the Big East, its first time in a conference with an automatic BCS bowl bid. After the fracturing of the Big East in 2012, the football-playing remnants of the conference, including Cincinnati, rebranded themselves as the American Athletic Conference (AAC), which they competed in until moving to the Big 12 Conference in 2023. The Bearcats have also previously played as a football "I-A" independent between 1970–1995 Throughout their history, the Bearcats have captured all or a share of 14 conference titles, despite these long bouts of gridiron nomadism.

== Seasons ==
Conference champions *	Division champions ‡	Bowl game berth ^

Season	Coach(es)	Conference	Division	Season results					Bowl result	Final ranking	
Season	Coach(es)	Conference	Division	Conference finish	Division finish	Wins	Losses	Ties (Note: Overtime rules in college football were introduced in 1996, making ties impossible in the period since.)	Bowl result	AP Poll	Coaches Poll
Cincinnati Bearcats
1885	—	Ind	—	—	—	1	0	1	—	N/A	N/A
1886	—	Ind	—	—	—	2	0	0	—	N/A	N/A
1887	—	Ind	—	—	—	1	0	0	—	N/A	N/A
1888	—	Ind	—	—	—	1	0	1	—	N/A	N/A
1889	—	Ind	—	—	—	1	1	0	—	N/A	N/A
1890	—	Ind	—	—	—	2	1	1	—	N/A	N/A
1891	—	Ind	—	—	—	4	2	1	—	N/A	N/A
1892	—	Ind	—	—	—	1	2	0	—	N/A	N/A
1893	—	Ind	—	—	—	0	6	0	—	N/A	N/A
1894	W. Durant Berry	Ind	—	—	—	3	3	0	—	N/A	N/A
1895	W. Durant Berry	Ind	—	—	—	3	3	0	—	N/A	N/A
1896	William A. Reynolds	Ind	—	—	—	4	3	1	—	N/A	N/A
1897	Tom Fennell	Ind	—	—	—	9	1	1	—	N/A	N/A
1898	Frank Cavanaugh	Ind	—	—	—	6	1	2	—	N/A	N/A
1899	Daniel A. Reed	Ind	—	—	—	5	2	0	—	N/A	N/A
1900	Daniel A. Reed	Ind	—	—	—	3	4	1	—	N/A	N/A
1901	Henry S. Pratt	Ind	—	—	—	1	3	1	—	N/A	N/A
1902	Anthony Chez	Ind	—	—	—	4	2	2	—	N/A	N/A
1903	Anthony Chez	Ind	—	—	—	1	8	0	—	N/A	N/A
1904	Amos Foster	Ind	—	—	—	7	1	0	—	N/A	N/A
1905	Amos Foster	Ind	—	—	—	4	3	0	—	N/A	N/A
1906	William Foley	Ind	—	—	—	0	7	2	—	N/A	N/A
1907	No team	N/A	—	N/A	N/A	N/A	N/A	N/A	N/A	N/A	N/A
1908	Ralph Inott	Ind	—	—	—	1	4	1	—	N/A	N/A
1909	Robert Burch	Ind	—	—	—	4	3	1	—	N/A	N/A
1910	Robert Burch	OAC	—	—	—	6	3	0	—	N/A	N/A
1911	Robert Burch	OAC	—	2nd	—	6	2	1	—	N/A	N/A
1912	Lowell Dana	OAC	—	3rd	—	3	4	1	—	N/A	N/A
1913 *	Lowell Dana	OAC	—	1st *	—	5	3	1	—	N/A	N/A
1914 *	George Little	OAC	—	1st *	—	6	3	0	—	N/A	N/A
1915	George Little	OAC	—	5th	—	4	5	0	—	N/A	N/A
1916	Ion Cortright	OAC	—	5th	—	0	8	1	—	N/A	N/A
1917	Frank Marty	OAC	—	5th	—	0	6	0	—	N/A	N/A
1918	Boyd Chambers	OAC	—	2nd	—	3	0	2	—	N/A	N/A
1919	Boyd Chambers	OAC	—	5th	—	3	4	1	—	N/A	N/A
1920 *	Boyd Chambers	OAC	—	1st *	—	4	5	0	—	N/A	N/A
1921	Boyd Chambers	OAC	—	5th	—	2	6	0	—	N/A	N/A
1922	George McLaren	OAC	—	4th	—	1	7	1	—	N/A	N/A
1923 *	George McLaren	OAC	—	1st *	—	6	3	0	—	N/A	N/A
1924 *	George McLaren	OAC	—	1st *	—	2	6	1	—	N/A	N/A
1925	George McLaren	OAC	—	4th	—	4	5	0	—	N/A	N/A
1926	George McLaren	Buckeye	—	—	—	3	5	1	—	N/A	N/A
1927	George Babcock	Buckeye	—	—	—	2	5	2	—	N/A	N/A
1928	George Babcock	Buckeye	—	6th	—	1	8	0	—	N/A	N/A
1929	George Babcock	Buckeye	—	—	—	4	4	1	—	N/A	N/A
1930	George Babcock	Buckeye	—	3rd	—	5	4	0	—	N/A	N/A
1931	Dana M. King	Buckeye	—	—	—	5	4	0	—	N/A	N/A
1932	Dana M. King	Buckeye	—	—	—	7	2	0	—	N/A	N/A
1933 *	Dana M. King	Buckeye	—	1st *	—	7	2	0	—	N/A	N/A
1934 *	Dana M. King	Buckeye	—	1st *	—	6	2	1	—	N/A	N/A
1935	Russ Cohen	Buckeye	—	2nd	—	7	2	0	—	N/A	N/A
1936	Russ Cohen	Buckeye	—	—	—	1	5	3	—	—	N/A
1937	Russ Cohen, Wade Woodworth	Buckeye	—	—	—	0	10	0	—	—	N/A
1938	Joseph A. Meyer	Ind	—	—	—	4	5	0	—	—	N/A
1939	Joseph A. Meyer	Ind	—	—	—	4	3	2	—	—	N/A
1940	Joseph A. Meyer	Ind	—	—	—	5	3	1	—	—	N/A
1941	Joseph A. Meyer	Ind	—	—	—	6	3	0	—	—	N/A
1942	Joseph A. Meyer	Ind	—	—	—	8	2	0	—	—	N/A
1943	No team	N/A	—	—	—	N/A	N/A	N/A	N/A	N/A	N/A
1944	No team	N/A	—	—	—	N/A	N/A	N/A	N/A	N/A	N/A
1945	Ray Nolting	Ind	—	—	—	4	4	0	—	—	N/A
1946	Ray Nolting	Ind	—	—	—	9	2	0	Won 1947 Sun Bowl vs. VPI, 18–6 ^	—	N/A
1947 *	Ray Nolting	MAC	—	1st *	—	7	3	0	—	—	N/A
1948	Ray Nolting	MAC	—	2nd	—	3	6	1	—	—	N/A
1949 *	Sid Gillman	MAC	—	1st *	—	7	4	0	Won 1949 Glass Bowl vs. Toledo, 33–13 ^	—	N/A
1950	Sid Gillman	MAC	—	2nd	—	8	4	0	Lost 1951 Sun Bowl vs. West Texas State, 13–14 ^	—	—
1951 *	Sid Gillman	MAC	—	1st *	—	10	1	0	—	—	—
1952 *	Sid Gillman	MAC	—	1st *	—	8	1	1	—	—	—
1953	Sid Gillman	Ind	—	—	—	9	1	0	—	—	—
1954	Sid Gillman	Ind	—	—	—	8	2	0	—	—	—
1955	George Blackburn	Ind	—	—	—	1	6	2	—	—	—
1956	George Blackburn	Ind	—	—	—	4	5	0	—	—	—
1957	George Blackburn	MVC	—	4th	—	5	4	1	—	—	—
1958	George Blackburn	MVC	—	2nd	—	6	2	2	—	—	—
1959	George Blackburn	MVC	—	5th	—	5	4	1	—	—	—
1960	George Blackburn	MVC	—	3rd	—	4	6	0	—	—	—
1961	Charles Studley	MVC	—	3rd	—	3	7	0	—	—	—
1962	Charles Studley	MVC	—	3rd	—	2	8	0	—	—	—
1963 *	Charles Studley	MVC	—	1st *	—	6	4	0	—	—	—
1964 *	Charles Studley	MVC	—	1st *	—	8	2	0	—	—	—
1965	Charles Studley	MVC	—	3rd	—	5	5	0	—	—	—
1966	Charles Studley	MVC	—	3rd	—	3	7	0	—	—	—
1967	Homer Rice	MVC	—	3rd	—	3	6	0	—	—	—
1968	Homer Rice	MVC	—	3rd	—	5	4	1	—	—	—
1969	Ray Callahan	MVC	—	3rd	—	4	6	0	—	—	—
1970	Ray Callahan	Ind	—	—	—	7	4	0	—	—	—
1971	Ray Callahan	Ind	—	—	—	7	4	0	—	—	—
1972	Ray Callahan	Ind	—	—	—	2	9	0	—	—	—
1973	Tony Mason	Ind	—	—	—	4	7	0	—	—	—
1974	Tony Mason	Ind	—	—	—	7	4	0	—	—	—
1975	Tony Mason	Ind	—	—	—	6	5	0	—	—	—
1976	Tony Mason	Ind	—	—	—	9	2	0	—	—	—
1977	Ralph Staub	Ind	—	—	—	5	4	2	—	—	—
1978	Ralph Staub	Ind	—	—	—	5	6	0	—	—	—
1979	Ralph Staub	Ind	—	—	—	2	9	0	—	—	—
1980	Ralph Staub	Ind	—	—	—	2	9	0	—	—	—
1981	Mike Gottfried	Ind	—	—	—	6	5	0	—	—	—
1982	Mike Gottfried	Ind	—	—	—	6	5	0	—	—	—
1983	Watson Brown	Ind	—	—	—	4	6	1	—	—	—
1984	Dave Currey	Ind	—	—	—	2	9	0	—	—	—
1985	Dave Currey	Ind	—	—	—	5	6	0	—	—	—
1986	Dave Currey	Ind	—	—	—	5	6	0	—	—	—
1987	Dave Currey	Ind	—	—	—	4	7	0	—	—	—
1988	Dave Currey	Ind	—	—	—	3	8	0	—	—	—
1989	Tim Murphy	Ind	—	—	—	1	9	1	—	—	—
1990	Tim Murphy	Ind	—	—	—	1	10	0	—	—	—
1991	Tim Murphy	Ind	—	—	—	4	7	0	—	—	—
1992	Tim Murphy	Ind	—	—	—	3	8	0	—	—	—
1993	Tim Murphy	Ind	—	—	—	8	3	0	—	—	—
1994	Rick Minter	Ind	—	—	—	2	8	1	—	—	—
1995	Rick Minter	Ind	—	—	—	6	5	0	—	—	—
1996	Rick Minter	C-USA	—	3rd	—	6	5	—	—	—	—
1997	Rick Minter	C-USA	—	4th	—	8	4	—	Won 1997 Humanitarian Bowl vs. Utah State, 35–19 ^	—	—
1998	Rick Minter	C-USA	—	7th	—	2	9	—	—	—	—
1999	Rick Minter	C-USA	—	9th	—	3	8	—	—	—	—
2000	Rick Minter	C-USA	—	2nd	—	7	5	—	Lost 2000 Motor City Bowl vs. Marshall, 14–25 ^	—	—
2001	Rick Minter	C-USA	—	2nd	—	7	5	—	Lost 2001 Motor City Bowl vs. Toledo, 16–23 ^	—	—
2002 *	Rick Minter	C-USA	—	1st *	—	7	7	—	Lost 2002 New Orleans Bowl vs. North Texas, 19–24 ^	—	—
2003	Rick Minter	C-USA	—	9th	—	5	7	—	—	—	—
2004	Mark Dantonio	C-USA	—	2nd	—	7	5	—	Won 2004 Fort Worth Bowl vs. Marshall, 32–14 ^	—	—
2005	Mark Dantonio	Big East	—	T–6th	—	4	7	—	—	—	—
2006	Mark Dantonio, Brian Kelly	Big East	—	T–4th	—	8	5	—	Won 2007 International Bowl vs. Western Michigan, 27–24 ^	—	—
2007	Brian Kelly	Big East	—	T–3rd	—	10	3	—	Won 2007 PapaJohns.com Bowl vs. Southern Mississippi, 31–21 ^	17	20
2008 *	Brian Kelly	Big East	—	1st *	—	11	3	—	Lost 2009 Orange Bowl vs. Virginia Tech, 7–20 ^	17	17
2009 *	Brian Kelly, Jeff Quinn	Big East	—	1st *	—	12	1	—	Lost 2010 Sugar Bowl vs. Florida, 24–51 ^	8	9
2010	Butch Jones	Big East	—	7th	—	4	8	—	—	—	—
2011 *	Butch Jones	Big East	—	T–1st *	—	10	3	—	Won 2011 Liberty Bowl vs. Vanderbilt, 31–24 ^	25	21
2012 *	Butch Jones, Steve Stripling	Big East	—	T–1st *	—	10	3	—	Won 2012 Belk Bowl vs. Duke, 48–34 ^	RV	22
2013	Tommy Tuberville	AAC	—	3rd	—	9	4	—	Lost 2013 Belk Bowl vs. North Carolina, 17–39 ^	—	—
2014 *	Tommy Tuberville	AAC	—	T–1st *	—	9	4	—	Lost 2014 Military Bowl vs. Virginia Tech, 17–33 ^	—	—
2015	Tommy Tuberville	AAC	East	—	3rd	7	6	—	Lost 2015 Hawaii Bowl vs. San Diego State, 7–42 ^	—	—
2016	Tommy Tuberville	AAC	East	—	T–4th	4	8	—	—	—	—
2017	Luke Fickell	AAC	East	—	T–4th	4	8	—	—	—	—
2018	Luke Fickell	AAC	East	—	3rd	11	2	—	Won 2018 Military Bowl vs. Virginia Tech, 35–31 ^	24	23
2019 ‡	Luke Fickell	AAC	East	2nd	1st ‡	11	3	—	Won 2020 Birmingham Bowl vs. Boston College, 38–6 ^	21	21
2020 *	Luke Fickell	AAC	—	1st *	—	9	1	—	Lost 2021 Peach Bowl vs. Georgia, 21–24 ^	8	8
2021 *	Luke Fickell	AAC	—	1st *	—	13	1	—	Lost 2021 Cotton Bowl Classic vs. Alabama, 6–27 (CFP Semifinal) ^	4	4
2022	Luke Fickell, Kerry Coombs	AAC	—	3rd	—	9	4	—	Lost 2022 Fenway Bowl vs. Louisville, 7–24 ^	—	—
2023	Scott Satterfield	Big 12	—	14th	—	3	9	—	—	—	—
2024	Scott Satterfield	Big 12	—	T–11th	—	5	7	—	—	—	—
2025	Scott Satterfield	Big 12	—	T–7th	—	7	6	—	Lost 2026 Liberty Bowl vs. Navy, 13–35 ^	—	—
Total						674	621	50	(through 2025 season)		
