= Justin Williams (American football) =

American football player (born 2006)

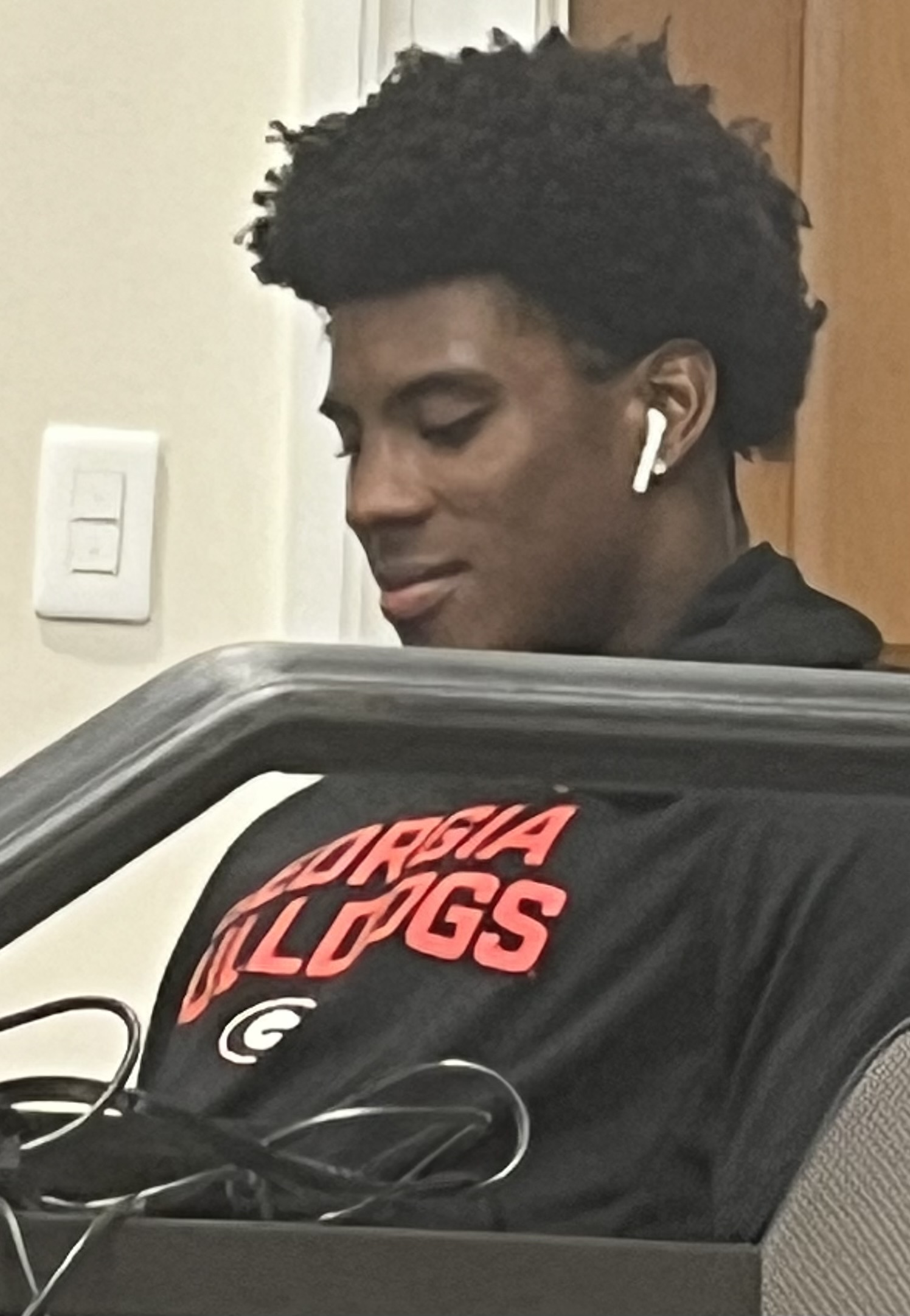
- Williams in 2025

No. 19 – Georgia Bulldogs
- Position: Linebacker
- Class: Junior

Personal information
- Born: January 30, 2006 (age 20)
- Listed height: 6 ft 2 in (1.88 m)
- Listed weight: 225 lb (102 kg)

Career information
- High school: Oak Ridge (Montgomery County, Texas)
- College: Georgia (2024–present)
- Stats at ESPN

Justin Williams (born January 30, 2006) is an American college football linebacker for the Georgia Bulldogs of the Southeastern Conference (SEC).

== Early life ==
Williams is from Conroe, Texas. He started playing football at age six, following after several of his older brothers. He attended Oak Ridge High School where he played football and was a top linebacker. As a junior, he recorded 105 tackles, 18 tackles-for-loss (TFLs) and 8 1/2 sacks while being named the Texas 13-6A Defensive Player of the Year. He then had 105 tackles, 37 TFLs, 8 1/2 sacks and seven forced fumbles as a senior while being named the All-Greater Houston Defensive Player of the Year. A five-star recruit, a top-15 prospect nationally and the number one-ranked linebacker in the class of 2024, he committed to play college football for the Georgia Bulldogs.

== College career ==
Williams was used as a backup as a freshman, mainly appearing on special teams. He played in 12 games, recording two tackles and one tackle-for-loss during the 2024 season.
