= Caleb Sturgis =

American football player (born 1989)

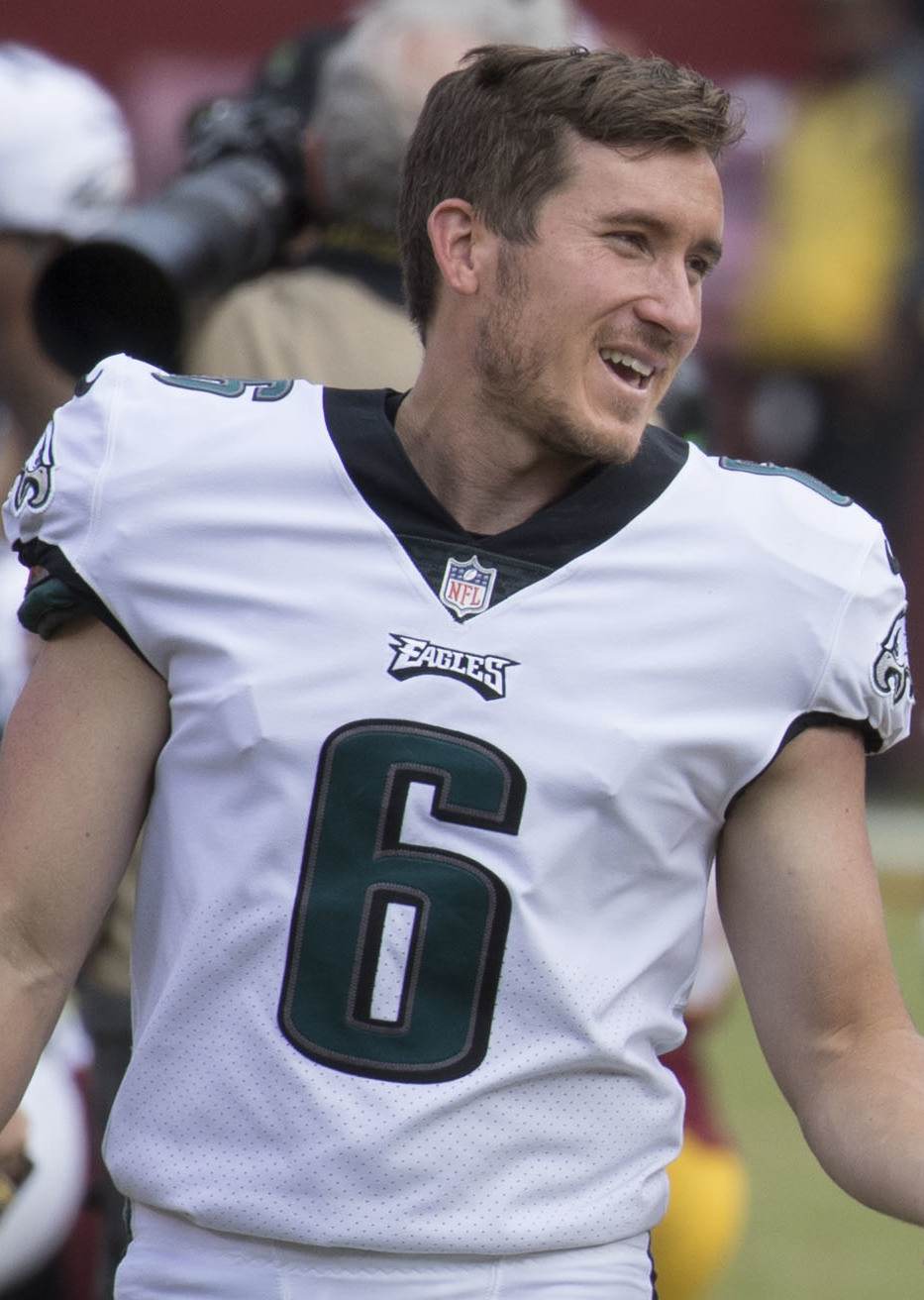
- Sturgis with the Philadelphia Eagles in 2017

No. 6, 9
- Position: Placekicker

Personal information
- Born: August 9, 1989 (age 37); St. Augustine, Florida, U.S.
- Listed height: 5 ft 9 in (1.75 m)
- Listed weight: 192 lb (87 kg)

Career information
- High school: St. Augustine
- College: Florida (2008–2012)
- NFL draft: 2013: 5th round, 166th overall pick

Career history
- Miami Dolphins (2013–2014); Philadelphia Eagles (2015–2017); Los Angeles Chargers (2018)

Awards and highlights
- Super Bowl champion (LII); PFWA All-Rookie Team (2013); BCS national champion (2008); SEC Special Teams Player of the Year (2012); First-team All-American (2012); Second-team All-American (2011); 2× First-team All-SEC (2011, 2012)

Career NFL statistics
- Field goals made: 120
- Field goal attempts: 150
- Field goal %: 80.0
- Longest field goal: 55
- Touchbacks: 162
- Stats at Pro Football Reference

Caleb James Sturgis (born August 9, 1989) is an American former professional football player who was a placekicker in the National Football League (NFL). He played college football for the Florida Gators, setting team records for field goals completed in a season and a career, and was recognized as a first-team All-American. He was selected by the Miami Dolphins in the fifth round of the 2013 NFL draft.

== Early life ==
Sturgis was born in St. Augustine, Florida. He attended St. Augustine High School, where he played for the St. Augustine Yellow Jackets high school football team. During his senior season, he completed 13 of 25 field goal attempts and 63 of 64 extra-point attempts. He was named to the Class 3A all-state first-team at the placekicker position. Sturgis also played on his high school soccer team.

== College career ==
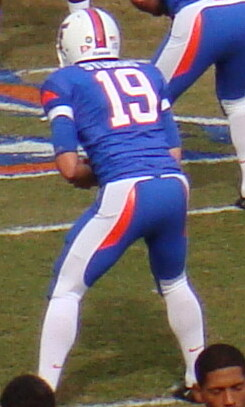
Sturgis with the Florida Gators in 2009

Sturgis accepted an athletic scholarship to attend the University of Florida in Gainesville, Florida, and played for coach Urban Meyer and coach Will Muschamp's Florida Gators football teams from 2008 to 2012. As a true freshman in 2008, he handled kickoffs for the Gators, and averaged 63.7 yards on 90 total kicks. He did not attempt a field goal as a freshman. The Gators won the 2009 BCS National Championship Game.

Sturgis made 22 of 30 field goal attempts in 2009. Against the Georgia Bulldogs, he made a 56-yard field goal, which was the longest field goal in the Southeastern Conference (SEC) that season and was also a career-long for him. He completed one of two field goal attempts in the 2010 Sugar Bowl, which Florida won. In 2010, Sturgis made two of four field goal attempts in four games before he suffered a back injury that ended his season. He was given a medical redshirt.

In 2011, Sturgis made 22 of 26 field goal attempts. His 22 completed field goals were the third-best total in the nation and the best in the SEC. He was named to the All-SEC first-team and was a Lou Groza Award finalist. He made his only field goal attempt in a 2012 Gator Bowl win. Sturgis made 24 of 28 field goal attempts in 2012. His 24 completed field goals led the SEC and set a new team record. Sturgis was a Lou Groza Award finalist. He made his only field goal attempt in the 2013 Sugar Bowl, which Florida lost.

In his career as a Florida Gator, Sturgis made 70 of 88 field goal attempts (79.5%) and 130 of 136 extra-point attempts (95.6%). His 70 completed field goals and 88 field goal attempts are both team records. He also averaged 64.4 yards on 343 kickoffs, with 67 touchbacks. Sturgis graduated from the University of Florida with a Bachelor of Science degree in Sport Management in 2011, and Master of Science degree in Management in 2012.

== Professional career ==
Pre-draft measurables
Height	Weight	Arm length	Hand span
5 ft 9 7/8 in (1.77 m)	188 lb (85 kg)	30 in (0.76 m)	8 3/4 in (0.22 m)

=== Miami Dolphins ===
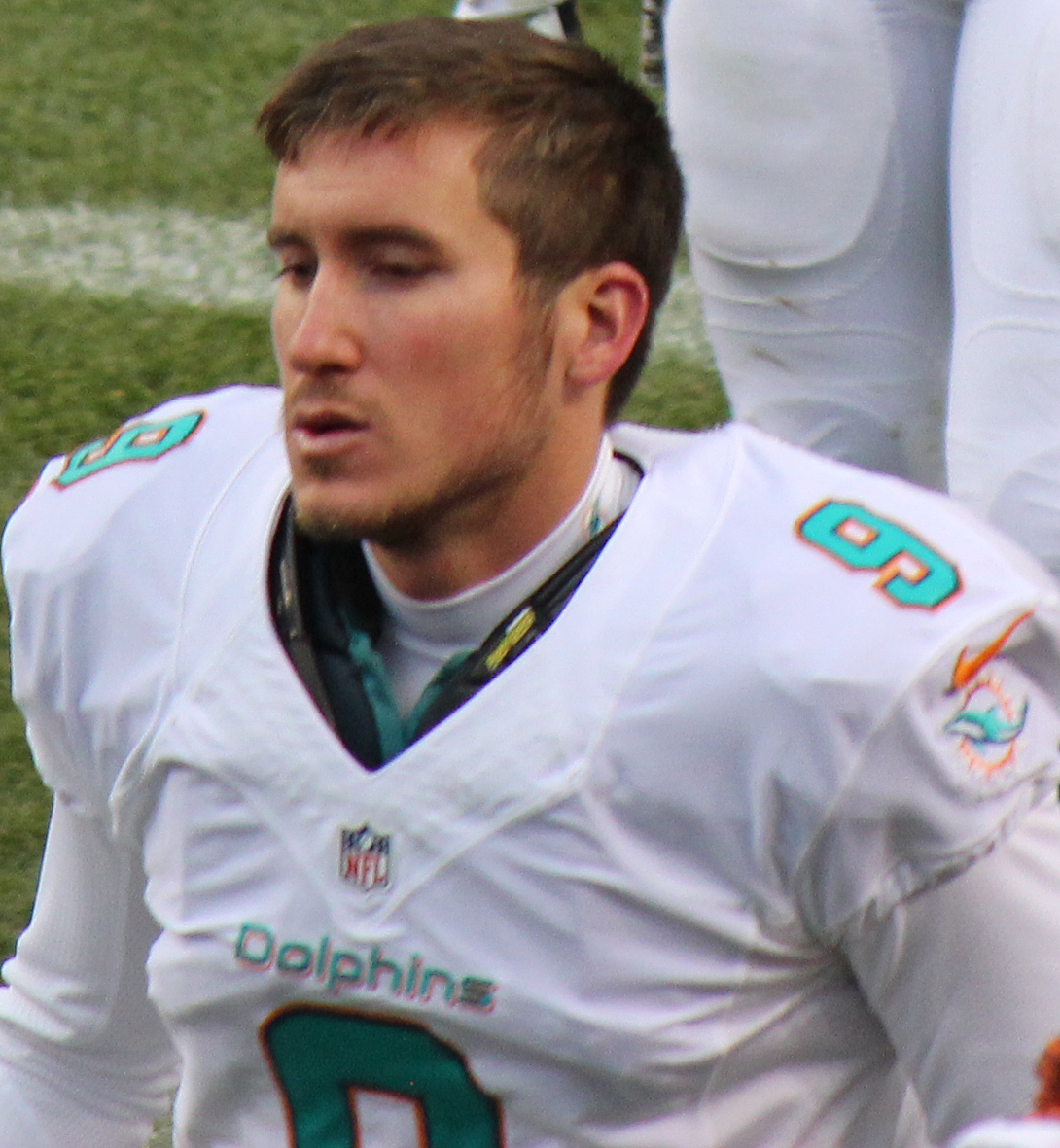
Sturgis with the Miami Dolphins, 2014

In the 2013 NFL draft, Sturgis was selected by the Miami Dolphins in the fifth round, as the 166th overall pick. He was the first placekicker taken in the draft.

On August 14, 2013, Sturgis became the starter for the 2013 season after a short-lived competition with Dan Carpenter and with the latter being released that day. In his professional debut, Sturgis did not miss any of his 3 field goal attempts. In Week 5 against the Baltimore Ravens, Sturgis tried to send the game into overtime when he attempted a 57-yard field goal near the end of fourth quarter as the Dolphins lost 26–23. In Week 9 against the Cincinnati Bengals, Sturgis kicked a 44-yard field goal to tie the game at 20 with 11 seconds to go in regulation as the Dolphins won 22–20 in overtime. He was named to the PFWA All-Rookie Team.

Sturgis was released by the team on September 5, 2015, and was replaced by Andrew Franks.

=== Philadelphia Eagles ===
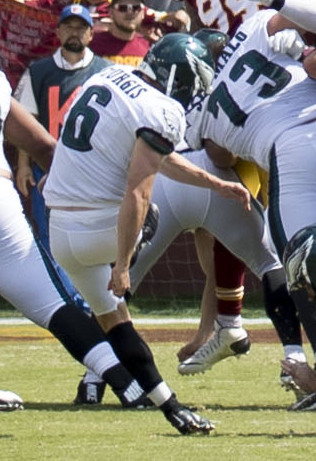
Sturgis kicking a field goal against the Washington Redskins, 2017

On September 28, 2015, Sturgis signed with the Philadelphia Eagles, following a season-ending injury to Cody Parkey.

In his first game with the Eagles, Sturgis missed a 30-yard field goal attempt and an extra point attempt, which could have turned the scoreboard in favor of the Eagles as they went on to lose 23–20 to the Washington Redskins. After the game Sturgis took responsibility, saying "the rest of the team gave such a good effort today. [They] played so well. It's tough knowing I didn't do my part. I just went out there and missed. Hurt the team. It's on me." After the game, head coach Chip Kelly decided Sturgis is better than anyone else they could sign. "We looked at what's out there," Kelly said. "I think the state of kicking in the league now is not very good. There's been a lot of changes. ...We feel in terms of what's available out there, we're going to stick with Caleb." In his second game with the Eagles, Sturgis missed another extra point, but was able to make all four of his field goals including one that broke a 7–7 second quarter tie in a 39–17 victory over the New Orleans Saints. However, Kelly did not show much confidence in his kicker as he went for it two times on fourth and long early in the game.

On September 7, 2016, Sturgis signed a one-year extension worth $900,000 to remain with the Eagles after beating out Parkey in training camp.

On September 10, 2017, in the season opening 30–17 victory over the Washington Redskins, Sturgis converted three field goals, a 50-yarder, a 42-yarder, and a 37-yarder. However, Sturgis suffered a hip injury in the game and was placed on injured reserve on September 12, 2017. Without Sturgis, the Eagles won Super Bowl LII against the New England Patriots.

=== Los Angeles Chargers ===
On March 16, 2018, Sturgis signed a two-year contract with the Los Angeles Chargers. He won the Chargers starting kicking job after beating out Roberto Aguayo. Sturgis was released by the Chargers on November 5, 2018, after missing a field goal and two extra points in Week 9.

== Personal life ==
Sturgis married Kimberly Davidson, a former University of Florida cheerleader, in July 2014. Sturgis has five siblings. His older brother, Nathan Sturgis, played in Major League Soccer. One of his younger brothers, Mark, was also a placekicker at Saint Augustine High, following in his brother's footsteps. His father, Smiley Sturgis, is a pastor.

As of 2018, Sturgis coached at Kohl's Kicking Camps, a training camp.

== See also ==
- 2012 College Football All-America Team
- List of Florida Gators football All-Americans
- List of Florida Gators in the NFL draft
- List of SEC Most Valuable Players
- List of University of Florida alumni
