= Omarius Hines =

American football player (born 1989)

Profile
- Position: Tight end/wide receiver

Personal information
- Born: December 18, 1989 (age 36); Corsicana, Texas, U.S.
- Listed height: 6 ft 0 in (1.83 m)
- Listed weight: 215 lb (98 kg)

Career information
- College: Florida
- NFL draft: 2013: undrafted

Career history
- Baltimore Ravens (2013)*; Green Bay Packers (2013)*
- * Offseason or practice squad member only

Omarius Hines (born December 18, 1989) is an American former football wide receiver.

== College career ==
Hines played college football as a tight end and wide receiver for the University of Florida Gators football team from 2009 to 2012. At Florida, he caught 64 passes for 801 yards.

== Professional career ==
=== Baltimore Ravens ===
On April 27, 2013, he signed with the Baltimore Ravens as an undrafted free agent.

On July 22, 2013, Hines was waived by the Baltimore Ravens.

=== Green Bay Packers ===
On July 29, 2013, Hines was signed by the Green Bay Packers.

On August 25, 2013, Hines was released by the Green Bay Packers.
