= Emmanuel Moody =

German gridiron football player (born 1987)

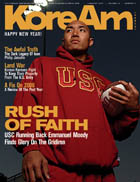
- Moody on the January 2007 cover of KoreAm

No. 21
- Position: Running back

Personal information
- Born: February 21, 1987 (age 39); Heidelberg, Germany
- Listed height: 6 ft 1 in (1.85 m)
- Listed weight: 211 lb (96 kg)

Career information
- High school: Coppell (Coppell, Texas, U.S.)
- College: USC (2006); Florida (2007–2010)
- NFL draft: 2011: undrafted

Career history
- Buffalo Bills (2011)*; Dresden Monarchs (2013); Vikings Vienna (2014); Boston Brawlers (2014)
- * Offseason or practice squad member only

Awards and highlights
- BCS national champion (2009)
- Stats at Pro Football Reference

Emmanuel Moody (born February 21, 1987) is an American former professional football running back. He was signed by the Buffalo Bills as an undrafted free agent in 2011. He played college football for the University of Florida (UF) Gators football team winning a national championship. In 2013, he played in Germany for the Dresden Monarchs. He played in 2014 with the Vienna Vikings in Austrian Football League.

== Early life ==
Moody was born to Young Sun (née Chang) as the youngest of three children, raised in the Dallas, Texas, area. His father left the family early, leaving him to be raised by his mother and his grandmother, Han Soon Chang. And Moody's uncle began helping him practice and train for football after seeing how well he performed in pee wee football.

Physically a late bloomer, coaches initially hesitated to put him in the running back role that he desired. When his family moved to the suburb of Coppell, Texas, Coppell High School already had a highly regarded senior running back, one of the best in school history, and asked the sophomore Moody to spend a season at wide receiver. After insistence by himself and his uncle, Moody was allowed to play running back at the junior varsity level. During that time, Moody grew taller and put on 25 pounds. His junior season saw him rise to the varsity team where he finished the season with 1,319 yards and 12 touchdowns. His abilities attracted interest from a number of prominent college football programs, notably Texas, Miami and Southern California. Moody originally verbally committed to Texas, but USC linebacker coach Ken Norton was able to eventually persuade Moody to change his commitment to the Trojans, enticing him to the challenge of competing against a number of other talented running backs.

== College career ==
=== University of Southern California (2006–2007) ===
Moody started his college career at the University of Southern California in Los Angeles. As a true freshman, Moody was the second leading rusher in the 2006 season, gaining 560 yards on 79 carries in a rotating platoon of running backs. He was named the Pacific-10 Conference Freshman of the Year in 2006.

In the summer before the 2007 season, he was featured as one of three USC running backs on the regional cover of Sports Illustrated's college football preview edition.

The Trojans entered their 2007 fall training camp with a high number of scholarship running backs (10), all of which were highly touted recruits; in August, midway through camp, Moody announced he was transferring from USC. Looking to be a featured player, Moody stated he had "felt forgotten" coming into training camp because of an ankle injury that forced him to sit out the Trojans' last four games of the 2006 season and a hamstring injury that caused him to sit out nearly all of spring practice; he then bruised his knee at a mid-camp scrimmage and had to sit out further. After looking at several schools, including Oklahoma State and North Carolina, Moody transferred to the University of Florida.

=== University of Florida (2007–2010) ===
As required by NCAA transfer rules, Moody was forced to sit out the 2007 season with the Florida Gators; but was permitted to practice with the scout team. Welcomed by a team that needed a power running back to relieve quarterback Tim Tebow, Moody had some difficulties adapting to the spread offense used by the Gators. He had 58 carries for 417 yards in the 2008 season, 58 carries for 378 yards in the 2009 season, and 66 carries for 265 yards in 2010, scoring four total rushing touchdowns in his three seasons as a Gator. Moody participated in the Gator Pro Day but was not drafted in the 2011 NFL draft.

== Professional career ==
=== Buffalo Bills ===
On April 30, 2011, Moody signed with the Buffalo Bills. He was released on October 21.

=== Europe ===
In 2013 Moody signed in Europe with the Dresden Monarchs in the German Football League. Playing three games and rushing 11 times for 84 yards and one touchdown.

In 2014 Moody signed with the Vienna Vikings in Austrian Football League. In seven games, Moody had 417 yards on 71 carries and scored six touchdowns. He also had nine receptions for 118 yards.

== Personal life ==
Moody was born in Heidelberg, Germany, to Young Sun Chang Moody and Eugene Moody Sr., and is of Korean descent through his mother. He was raised primarily in the Dallas suburb of Coppell, Texas, by his mother and extended family, including his grandmother Han Soon Chang, sister Angela, brother Eugene Jr., and uncle Inho Chang, who helped coach and train him during his youth. As a child, Moody has said he sometimes encountered stereotypes about Asian athletes while playing football.

In the same interview, Moody discussed his Christian faith, saying he was “saved” at a church retreat with the Korean Central United Methodist Church in Houston. He explained that he viewed football as a way to “glorify God’s name” and hoped to use his athletic career as a platform to inspire others. ,
