= John Brantley =

American football player (born 1989)

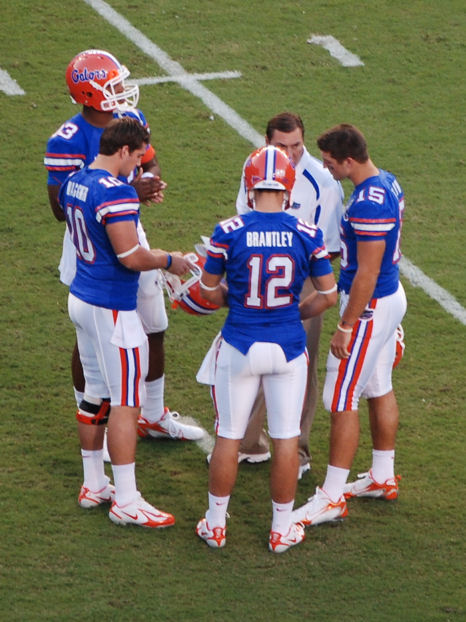
- Brantley (front center) during his freshman year with Tim Tebow, Bryan Waggener (#10), and Cam Newton (#13)

No. 12
- Position: Quarterback

Personal information
- Born: March 3, 1989 (age 37); Ocala, Florida, U.S.
- Listed height: 6 ft 3 in (1.91 m)
- Listed weight: 219 lb (99 kg)

Career information
- High school: Trinity Catholic (Ocala)
- College: Florida
- NFL draft: 2012: undrafted

Career history
- Baltimore Ravens (2012)*
- * Offseason or practice squad member only

Awards and highlights
- BCS national champion (2008)

John Brantley, IV (born March 3, 1989) is an American former football quarterback. He played college football at Florida from 2008 to 2011. He was signed by the Baltimore Ravens after going undrafted in the 2012 NFL draft but was released before the start of the season.

Brantley has family connections to the University of Florida. His father, John Brantley, III, also played quarterback there in the late 1970s and his uncle, Scot Brantley, played linebacker for the Gators and went on to the NFL.

== Early life ==
Brantley attended Trinity Catholic High School in Ocala, Florida.

As a sophomore, Brantley threw for 1,201 yards, 17 touchdowns and one interception, while sharing time with senior Seth Varnadore. During his junior season, he threw for 2,835 yards, 41 touchdowns and five interceptions, leading Trinity Catholic to the Florida Class 2B state title. Brantley finished his high school career with an FHSAA record 99 touchdown passes, breaking the previous state mark of 98, held by Tim Tebow. Following his high school career, Brantley was invited to play in the 2007 U.S. Army All-American Bowl.

Brantley was chosen as the 2006 Gatorade National Player of the Year for football and was judged a four star recruit by Scout.com.

=== Recruiting process ===
After a trip to Austin to see the University of Texas, Brantley committed to the Longhorns. In a later interview with FloridaFB.com, Brantley reiterated his commitment to Texas, stating that he felt it was "a real special thing to be headed out there [Texas]."

The other schools on Brantley's shortlist included Alabama, Louisville, Oklahoma, and Florida.

In December 2006, Rivals.com reported that Brantley would de-commit from Texas to follow in the footsteps of his uncle at the University of Florida. He later signed his letter of intent, and enrolled in Gainesville in 2007.

== College career ==
Brantley redshirted his first season with the Gators in 2007, before competing with Cam Newton for the backup job as a redshirt freshman in the 2008 season. Brantley first saw playing time in the season opener against Hawaii, and would go in as the backup after the starters were pulled in several conference games. He appeared in nine games, with pass attempts in seven of them. Brantley finished the 2008 season going 18 for 28 passing for 235 yards, three touchdowns, and one interception.

Brantley earned media attention during the 2009 season after starting quarterback Tim Tebow suffered a concussion in a September 26 game against Kentucky. It was speculated Brantley would make the first start of his Gator career in Baton Rouge at LSU, but Tebow was cleared to play on the day of the game.

In Florida's spring game of 2010, he completed 15 of 19 passes for 201 yards and two touchdowns.

Brantley was the starting quarterback in the Gators' 2011 season. He injured his ankle in the October 1 game against Alabama and missed the following two games.

== Professional career ==
Brantley signed as an undrafted free agent with the Baltimore Ravens on April 28, 2012 after going undrafted in the 2012 NFL draft. He was waived on August 1, 2012.
