= Mr. Two Bits =

American football cheerleader (1922–2019)

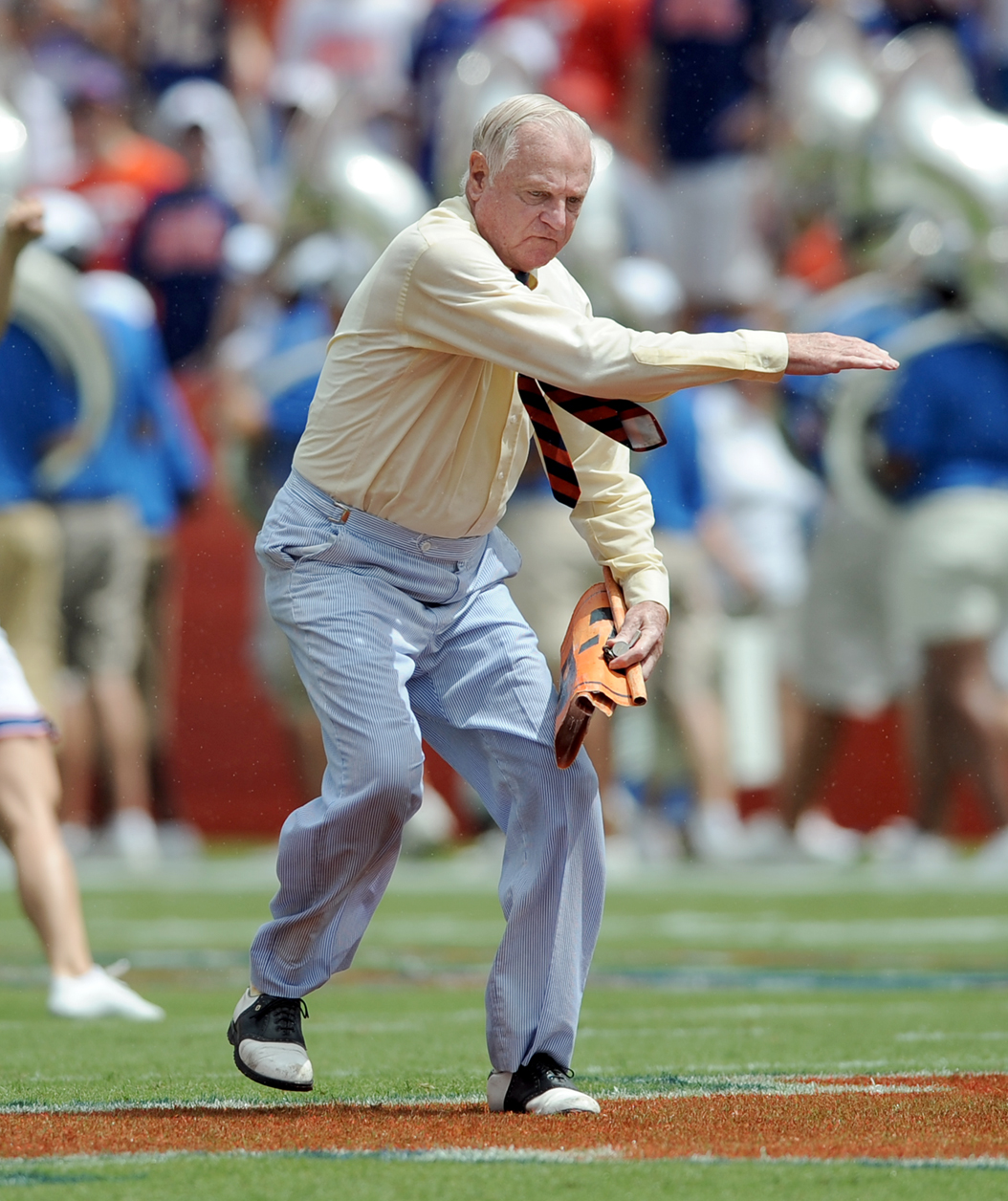
- "Mr. Two Bits" leading a pre-game cheer
- Born: July 17, 1922; Atlanta, Georgia, U.S.
- Died: July 2, 2019 (aged 96); Tampa, Florida, U.S.
- Occupations: Insurance salesman Amateur cheerleader
- Spouse: Jane Edmondson

George E. Edmondson Jr. (July 17, 1922 – July 2, 2019) was an insurance salesman from Tampa, Florida who was known to the University of Florida community as "Mr. Two Bits". Edmondson was a fan of the Florida Gators football team, for which he led a traditional "Two Bits' cheer" at football games beginning in 1949. Though he began the practice in an unofficial capacity, it eventually became so popular among fans at Florida Field that he was invited to lead the cheer from midfield before games, which he did from the mid-1970s until 2008. Citing health concerns, he retired from the role after the 2008 season and died in 2019.

Beginning in 2009, a series of University of Florida students and famous alumni have taken over the Mr. Two Bits role during pregame festivities at Ben Hill Griffin Stadium, which higher profile "Guest Mr. Two-Bits" usually tapped to lead the cheer before higher profile games. Edmondson's cheer and distinctive orange-and-blue-striped tie became so popular that they have been used by the university as a symbol of alumni support.

== Early life ==
George Edmondson was born in Atlanta, Georgia, and his family moved to Tampa, Florida when he was an infant. He attended The Citadel military school for two years, but with the beginning of World War II, he enlisted in the United States Navy and eventually became a pilot flying Grumman F6F Hellcat carrier-based fighter planes in the Pacific theater of war.

== Mr. Two Bits ==
After the war, Edmondson returned to Tampa and worked in the insurance business. The Two Bits tradition began spontaneously in 1949, when a friend gave him a ticket to see The Citadel play against the Florida Gators in Gainesville in the season-opening game for both teams. The Gators had lost five of their last six games the previous year and were not expected to do any better. When the fans booed the players and the coach even before the opening kickoff, Edmondson decided to boost their morale by leading them in a cheer about adding up bits (a "bit" is an eighth of a dollar, so eight of them would indeed total one dollar). The Gators won the game, and fans were so enthusiastic about Edmondson's cheer that he returned the next Saturday to lead it again.

Edmondson bought season tickets for the Gators' 1950 football campaign and continued to lead the two-bits cheer. Eventually, he began leaving his seat to wander throughout the stands of Florida Field, leading the cheer in seating sections around the stadium. Edmondson continued leading the cheer at almost every Gator home game and selected road and bowl games over the next several decades. Beginning In the late 1970s, the university invited him to lead the entire crowd in the two-bits cheer from midfield as part of pregame festivities.

Edmondson was never paid for his services, and even after becoming an integral part of Florida's gameday traditions, he insisted on paying for his tickets like any other fan. In the early 1980s, Tampa Bay Buccaneers owner Hugh Culverhouse offered to pay Edmondson "real well" to lead the Two Bits cheer at his hometown Bucs games. Edmondson declined the offer, saying, "What I do for the Gators is from the heart, not from the pocketbook."

Edmondson announced his retirement from cheerleading at the end of the 1998 football season and received a game ball from head coach Steve Spurrier during an on-field ceremony before the last home game. However, he continued to occasionally lead the Two Bits cheer from his seat in the stands, and was eventually talked into once again leading the cheer from the field before each home game. He retired for good at the end of the 2008 season, and the university held another pregame ceremony before the last home game against The Citadel, the same team the Gators were playing when Edmondson began the tradition 60 seasons earlier. Edmondson did not perform the cheer again following his second retirement, saying at the time that "at 86 years of age, I've got to slow down. Nothing is forever." Edmondson and his wife, Jane, attended a few Gator home games in the season after his retirement, but thereafter watched the contests on television from their home in Tampa.

=== Cheer ===
Edmondson used a similar routine whether he led his cheer from the stands or from the field. During the game, he would walk through the stands, wait for a break in the action, then draw attention to himself and silence the crowd by holding up a small orange and blue sign reading "2 Bits" and blowing a whistle. (He used a bugle during his first few years, but found a whistle to be easier to carry.) Once the surrounding fans quieted down, Mr. Two Bits prompted them to yell each line of the cheer with arm waves and fist pumps, encouraging them to roar after the last line.

When performing during pre-game festivities, Mr. Two Bits would be introduced and energetically jog to midfield wearing his signature outfit. Then, using the same whistle and sign and even more vigorous arm waving, he would lead the entire Florida Field crowd in the cheer. Usually, his routine came just before the entrance of the Gator football team and the opening kickoff.

As performed at the University of Florida, the Two Bits cheer is as follows: "Two Bits! Four Bits! Six Bits! A Dollar! All for the Gators, stand up and holler!"

=== Outfit ===
During his time as Mr. Two Bits, Edmonson wore a distinctive outfit consisting of a long-sleeved yellow dress shirt, an orange and blue tie, white-and-blue-striped seersucker pants, and black-and-white saddle shoes to every Gator game. This was standard attire for college football fans when he started performing the cheer in the late 1940s, and he continued to wear his "lucky" outfit to stand out in the crowd after his cheer became popular.

In recent years, the university has used the combination of Edmonson's yellow shirt and orange-and-blue-striped tie as a symbol of school spirit. It was most notably used in February 2019, when UF promoted its "Stand Up & Holler" university fund drive by mailing thousands of striped-tie stickers to alumni and university boosters and prominently displaying the tie around campus.

=== Legacy ===
Edmondson was well known to generations of Florida fans. Though he was never a University of Florida student, the school named him an honorary alumnus in 2005, and he claimed it as his new alma mater. He was inducted into the University of Florida Athletic Hall of Fame as an "honorary letter winner" in 1992. When he died on July 2, 2019, at the age of 96, his death received coverage in national sports media.

George and Jane Edmondson established the Mr. Two Bits Scholarship Fund, which benefits a University of Florida cheerleader every year.

== Celebrity Mr. Two-Bits ==
After Edmondson's 2008 retirement, costumed mascot Albert the Alligator donned a special Mr. Two Bits outfit to lead a pregame two-bits cheer from the field. Since 2013, Albert has been joined during pregame festivities by a famous alumnus or a student contest winner to serve as a "Celebrity Mr. Two Bits" for the day. These special guests usually wear similar clothing to that worn by the original Mr. Two Bits, and lead the crowd in the cheer in a similar whistle-blowing and arm-waving fashion. A few of the guest Mr. Two Bits have also wandered through the stands to lead various sections in the cheer like Edmondson once did.

Most Celebrity Mr. Two-Bits honorees have been popular former Gator athletic stars. The list includes Heisman Trophy-winning quarterback Danny Wuerffel, All-American and NFL Pro Bowler Cris Collinsworth, professional golfer Chris Dimarco, Olympic medal-winning swimmer Dara Torres, and members of Florida's back-to-back NCAA champion basketball team. Heisman Trophy winning player and national championship winning coach Steve Spurrier was the Celebrity Mr. Two Bits at the first game of the 2016 season, when the field was rechristened "Steve Spurrier – Florida Field" in his honor. Since 2014, a current UF student has been selected to be the guest Mr. Two Bits for one game per season. Also since 2014, the guest Mr. Two Bits for a home game near to Veterans Day has been a veteran with close ties to the university.

2013 Honorary Mr. Two Bits
8/31	Toledo	Errict Rhett
9/21	Tennessee	Danny Wuerffel
10/5	Arkansas	Chris DiMarco
11/9	Vanderbilt	Chris Doering
11/23	Georgia Southern	Wes Chandler
11/30	Florida State	Carlos Alvarez

2014 Honorary Mr. Two Bits
9/6	Eastern Michigan	Josh Comiter (UF Student)
9/13	Kentucky	Thaddeus Bullard (Titus O'Neill)
10/11	LSU	Stacey Nelson & Hannah Rogers
10/18	Missouri	Lito Sheppard
11/15	South Carolina	Matt Elam
11/22	Eastern Kentucky	Bill Ebersole (UF alumnus, World War II veteran)

2015 Honorary Mr. Two Bits
9/5	New Mexico State	Bill Carr
9/12	East Carolina	Michael Cizek (UF student)
9/26	Tennessee	Alex Brown
10/3	Ole Miss	Dominique Easley
11/7	Vanderbilt	Matt LaPorta
11/21	FAU	Sgt. Corey Garmon (Army veteran)
11/28	Florida State	Kent Fuchs

2016 Honorary Mr. Two Bits
9/3	UMass	Steve Spurrier
9/10	Kentucky	2006 National Champion UF Men's Basketball Team
9/17	North Texas	Christopher Yanes (UF student)
10/15	Missouri	Brandon Siler
11/12	South Carolina	Christian Taylor & Kerron Clement

2017 Honorary Mr. Two Bits
9/16	Tennessee	Caeleb Dressel
9/30	Vanderbilt	Jordan Walker & Ryan Colon (UF students)
10/7	LSU	Alex Faedo
10/14	Texas A&M	Dara Torres
11/18	UAB	Bill Wood (UF athlete, Korean War veteran)
11/25	Florida State	Jimmy DuBose

2018 Honorary Mr. Two Bits
9/1	Charleston Southern	Cris Collinsworth
9/8	Kentucky	Bridget Sloan
9/15	Colorado State	Jonathan Frish (UF student)
10/6	LSU	Louis Murphy
11/3	Missouri	Angela McGinnis
11/10	South Carolina	Brady Singer
11/17	Idaho	Dave Kratzer (Retired UF employee & US Army veteran)

2019 Honorary Mr. Two Bits
9/7	UT Martin	The Edmondson family (1st game after death of George Edmondson)
9/21	Tennessee	Grant Holloway
9/28	Towson	Austin Barton (UF student)
10/5	Auburn	Brittany & Billy Horschel
11/9	Vanderbilt	Ike Hilliard
11/30	Florida State	Percy Harvin

2020 Honorary Mr. Two Bits
10/3	South Carolina	Stuart Hall (COVID-19 Survivor, Cameron Hall's Father - UF Soccer Midfielder)
10/31	Missouri	Jack Youngblood
11/14	Arkansas	Sandra Torres-Pintos (Marine Corps veteran)
11/28	Kentucky	David Steinfeldt (UF student)
12/12	LSU	Laura Rutledge

2021 Honorary Mr. Two Bits
9/4	FAU	Leonard George & Willie Jackson
9/18	Alabama	Bradley Beal
9/25	Tennessee	Sue Halfacre, Cherrietta Prince, & Nancy Thayer (Women's sports pioneers at UF)
10/9	Vanderbilt	2020 Olympic medalists Caeleb Dressel, Bobby Finke, Natalie Hinds, Grant Holloway, Mark Kolozsvary, Taylor Manson, Aubree Munro, & Kieran Smith
11/13	Samford	Joshua Avera, Brandon Roberts, & Eric Stafeld (UF ROTC)
11/27	Florida State	Lomas Brown

2022 Honorary Mr. Two Bits
9/3	Utah	Reidel Anthony
9/10	Kentucky	Mike Holloway
9/17	USF	Ben Shelton
10/2	Eastern Washington	Todd Eckstein & Kendra Vincent (Alachua County Teachers of the Year)
10/8	Missouri	Chandler Parsons
10/15	LSU	Mick Hubert
11/12	South Carolina	Meghan Kilpatrick, Jack McBrayer, Daniel Tomberg, & Maddie Kuennen (UF ROTC)

2023 Honorary Mr. Two Bits
9/9	McNeese State	Fred Biondi
9/16	Tennessee	Trey Burton
9/23	Charlotte	Dr. Karen Kearney (2023 Alachua County Teacher of the Year)
10/7	Vanderbilt	Lauren Embree
11/4	Arkansas	Eric Pugh, Alexander Quinones, Gabrielle Sasson, & Julian Trerotola (UF ROTC)
11/25	Florida State	Brandon Spikes

2024 Honorary Mr. Two Bits
8/31	Miami	Jevon Kearse
9/7	Samford	Dwynette Smith (2024 Alachua County Teacher of the Year)
9/14	Texas A&M	Emmitt Smith
10/5	UCF	2024 Olympians from UF
10/19	Kentucky	John L. Williams
11/16	LSU	Rex Grossman
11/23	Ole Miss	Major Wright

2025 Honorary Mr. Two Bits
8/30	LIU	Ahmad Black
9/6	USF	Monica Benson (2025 Alachua County Teacher of the Year)
10/4	Texas	Keanu Neal
10/18	Mississippi State	Lauren Haeger
11/22	Tennessee	Jemalle Cornelius
11/29	FSU	Noah Brindise

2026 Honorary Mr. Two Bits
9/5	FAU	Ciatrick Fason
9/12	Campbell	Barbara Brock (2026 Alachua County Teacher of the Year)
9/26	Ole Miss	Louis Oliver
10/10	South Carolina	Vernon Maxwell & Andrew Moten
11/7	Oklahoma	Jarvis Moss
11/21	Vanderbilt	Ron Coleman

== See also ==
- List of University of Florida Athletic Hall of Fame members
