= Trey Burton =

American football player (born 1991)

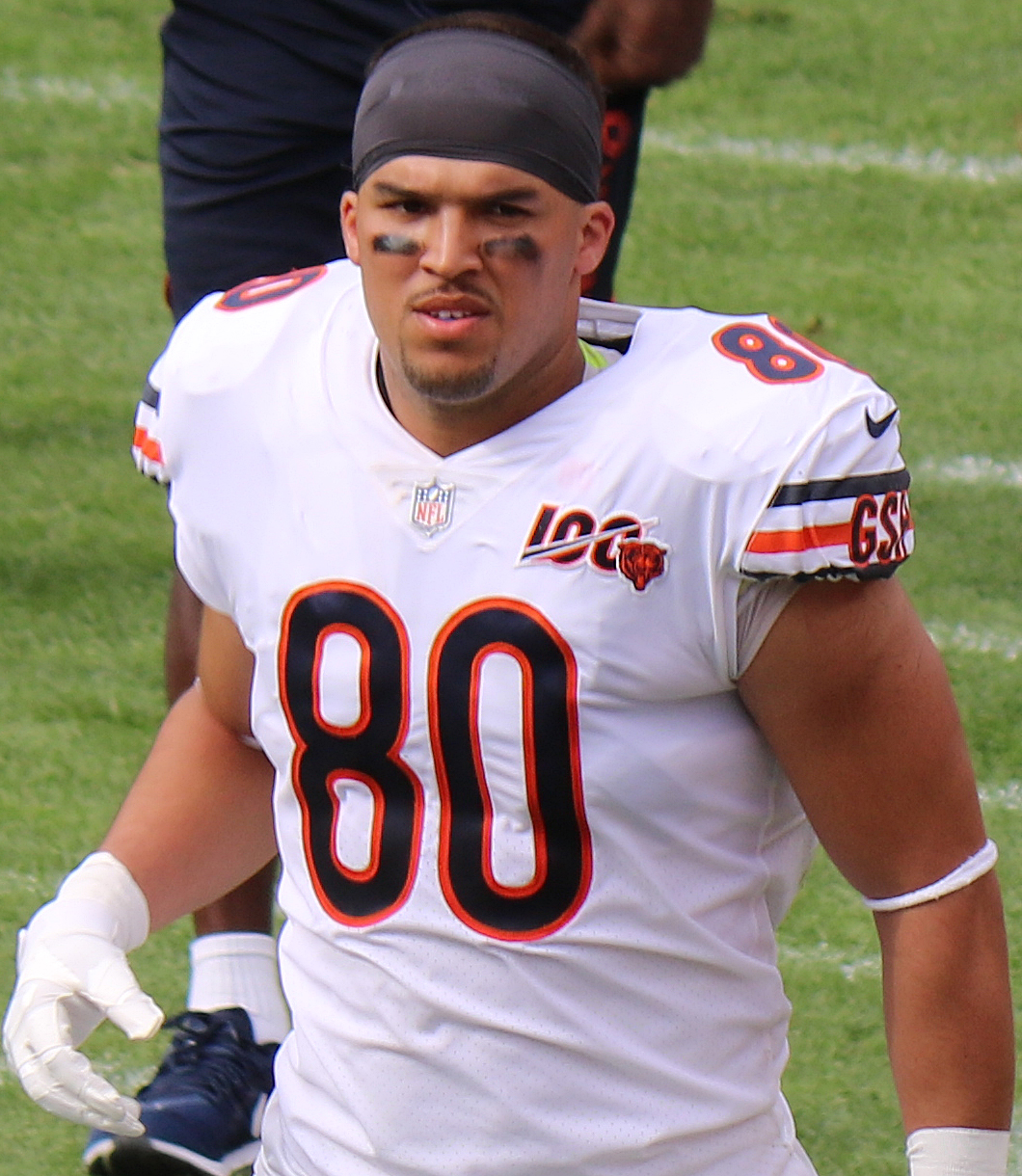
- Burton with the Chicago Bears in 2019

No. 47, 88, 80
- Position: Tight end

Personal information
- Born: October 29, 1991 (age 35); Venice, Florida, U.S.
- Listed height: 6 ft 2 in (1.88 m)
- Listed weight: 238 lb (108 kg)

Career information
- High school: Venice
- College: Florida (2010–2013)
- NFL draft: 2014: undrafted

Career history
- Philadelphia Eagles (2014–2017); Chicago Bears (2018–2019); Indianapolis Colts (2020)

Awards and highlights
- Super Bowl champion (LII); PFWA All-Rookie Team (2014)

Career NFL statistics
- Receptions: 159
- Receiving yards: 1,532
- Total touchdowns: 15
- Stats at Pro Football Reference

Lawrence Godfrey "Trey" Burton III (born October 29, 1991) is an American former professional football player who was a tight end in the National Football League (NFL) for seven seasons. He played college football for the Florida Gators and was signed by the Philadelphia Eagles as an undrafted rookie free agent in 2014, and he won Super Bowl LII with the team in his final season with the Eagles, including helping execute the Philly Special. Burton also played for the Chicago Bears and the Indianapolis Colts.

== Early life ==
Burton was born in Venice, Florida. He attended Venice High School, where he was a standout dual-threat quarterback for the Venice Indians high school football team. As the Indians starting junior quarterback in 2008, he completed 80 of 133 pass attempts for 1,399 yards and 12 touchdowns, while rushing for 919 yards and 24 touchdowns. As a senior in 2009, he passed for 1,876 yards with 18 touchdowns and only one interception, and rushed for 821 yards and 22 touchdowns, leading the team to a 9–2 record. He was a first-team all-state selection both years.

== College career ==
Burton accepted an athletic scholarship to attend the University of Florida, where he played for coach Urban Meyer and coach Will Muschamp's Florida Gators football teams from 2010 to 2013. Originally recruited as a quarterback in Urban Meyer's spread offense, he played several positions for the Gators, including wide receiver, tight end, fullback and quarterback. As a freshman in 2010, he broke Tim Tebow's team record for touchdowns in a single game with six in a 48–14 victory over Kentucky. In 50 career games with Florida, he had 720 rushing yards, 976 receiving yards, and 20 total touchdowns.

=== Statistics ===
Year	School	G	Rushing				Receiving			
Year	School	G	Att	Yds	Avg	TD	Rec	Yds	Avg	TD
2010	Florida	13	75	349	4.7	11	32	210	6.6	1
2011	Florida	13	37	125	3.4	3	19	149	7.8	1
2012	Florida	12	29	190	6.6	2	18	172	9.6	1
2013	Florida	12	12	56	4.7	0	38	445	11.7	1
Career	Total	50	153	720	4.7	16	107	976	9.1	4

== Professional career ==
=== Pre-draft ===
Burton received an invitation to the NFL combine and attended as one of 22 collegiate tight ends. His multiple positions through college made it difficult for scouts and analysts to determine what position he would play professionally. Standing at 6'2", he tied Tennessee State's A. C. Leonard as the shortest tight ends at the combine and was the lightest by 11 lbs. Burton finished with the fastest 40-yard dash time, tied for second in the three-cone drill, and fourth in the short shuttle among his position group at the combine. On March 17, 2014, Burton opted to participate at Florida's pro day, along with Dominique Easley, Solomon Patton, Loucheiz Purifoy, Marcus Roberson, Jon Halapio, Jonotthan Harrison, Ronald Powell, Jaylen Watkins, and two other teammates. He performed the vertical jump (33"), broad jump (9'5"), short shuttle (4.31), three-cone drill (7.01), and running back drills for the representatives and scouts from 32 NFL teams. Burton lowered his time in the short shuttle and three-cone drill, while also increasing his broad and vertical jumps from the combine. At the conclusion of the pre-draft process, Burton was projected to be a seventh round pick or be a priority undrafted free agent by NFL draft experts and analysts. He was ranked as the 39th best wide receiver prospect in the draft by NFLDraftScout.com.

Pre-draft measurables
Height	Weight	Arm length	Hand span	40-yard dash	10-yard split	20-yard split	20-yard shuttle	Three-cone drill	Vertical jump	Broad jump	Bench press
6 ft 2 1/8 in (1.88 m)	224 lb (102 kg)	31 in (0.79 m)	9 3/8 in (0.24 m)	4.62 s	1.62 s	2.69 s	4.32 s	7.14 s	30 in (0.76 m)	9 ft 4 in (2.84 m)	22 reps
All values from NFL Combine

=== Philadelphia Eagles ===
==== 2014 ====
Burton was not selected in the 2014 NFL draft. On May 10, 2014, the Philadelphia Eagles signed him as an undrafted free agent to a three-year, $1.53 million contract that includes $20,000 guaranteed and a signing bonus of $7,500. Throughout training camp, Burton competed for a roster spot against James Casey, Emil Igwenagu, and Blake Annen. He caught nine passes for 100-yards and a touchdown in four preseason games. Head coach Chip Kelly named Burton the fourth tight end on the Eagles' depth chart, behind Zach Ertz, Brent Celek, and James Casey. The Eagles initially had three roster spots for tight ends, but decided to make Burton the fourth after determining it was too risky to place him on waivers.

He made his professional debut in the Philadelphia Eagles' season-opening 34–17 win against the Jacksonville Jaguars. On October 12, 2014, Burton had five carries for 10 rushing yards during their 27–0 victory over the New York Giants. He was inactive for the Eagles' Week 14 loss to the Seattle Seahawks after suffering a hamstring injury. On December 28, 2014, Burton returned a punt recovery for a 27-yard touchdown after tight end James Casey blocked a punt attempt by the Giants' punter Steve Weatherford in the third quarter of a 34–26 victory over the New York Giants. This was Burton's first career touchdown and his only score of the 2014 season. Burton completed his rookie season with a total of four combined tackles on special teams and five carries for 10-yards and a touchdown in 15 games and zero starts. He primarily played on special teams and showed a lot of production throughout the season. Burton was named to the PFWA NFL All-Rookie team as a special teams player.

==== 2015 ====
Burton entered training camp competing for a roster spot against Eric Tomlinson, Andrew Gleichert, and Justin Tukes. He was expected to receive an expanded role on special teams and offense after James Casey was released. On August 29, 2015, Burton caught four passes for 21-yards and two touchdown receptions during a 39–26 preseason victory at the Green Bay Packers. He became the first Eagles' player to have two touchdown receptions in a single preseason game since former Eagles' tight end Clay Harbor in 2012. Burton was able to showcase his abilities after having increased playing time after Zach Ertz missed the preseason after suffering a core muscle injury. He was named the third tight end behind Ertz and Celek to begin the 2015 season.

On November 26, 2015, Burton recorded his first career reception and finished with two catches for 49-yards, though the Eagles lost 45–14 at the Detroit Lions. He was a key special teams contributor and led them with 19 combined tackles and also caught three receptions for 54 receiving yards in 16 games and zero starts.

==== 2016 ====
Under new head coach Doug Pederson, Burton was poised to have a larger role on the offense for the 2016 season. Throughout training camp, Burton was used in three tight end sets and at H-back. He competed for a roster spot against Chris Pantale, Dillon Gordon, and M. J. McFarland. The Eagles tested multiple players at fullback, but opted to instead use Burton as an H-Back in those situations. He was named the third tight end to start the regular season, behind Ertz and Celek.

He was inactive for the Philadelphia Eagles' season-opening 29–10 victory over the Cleveland Browns after suffering a calf injury. During the game, Zach Ertz displaced his rib and was expected to be inactive the following game with Burton as his replacement. On September 19, 2016, Burton caught five passes for 49-yards and scored his first career touchdown reception during a 29–14 victory at the Chicago Bears. On October 16, 2016, Burton earned his first career start and made one catch for a seven-yard gain as the Eagles lost 27–20 at the Washington Redskins. During a Week 14 matchup against the Redskins, Burton caught a season-high seven passes for 65 receiving yards in the Eagles 27–22 loss. He also filled in at longsnapper after Jon Dorenbos and emergency longsnapper Brent Celek both suffered injuries. He snapped for a field goal by Caleb Sturgis and helped the Eagles take a 22–21 lead. Burton completed the 2016 season with 37 receptions for 327 receiving yards and a touchdown in four starts and 15 games. He played a career-high 233 offensive snaps (29%) and had both a forced fumble and fumble recovery on special teams.

==== 2017: Super Bowl LII season ====
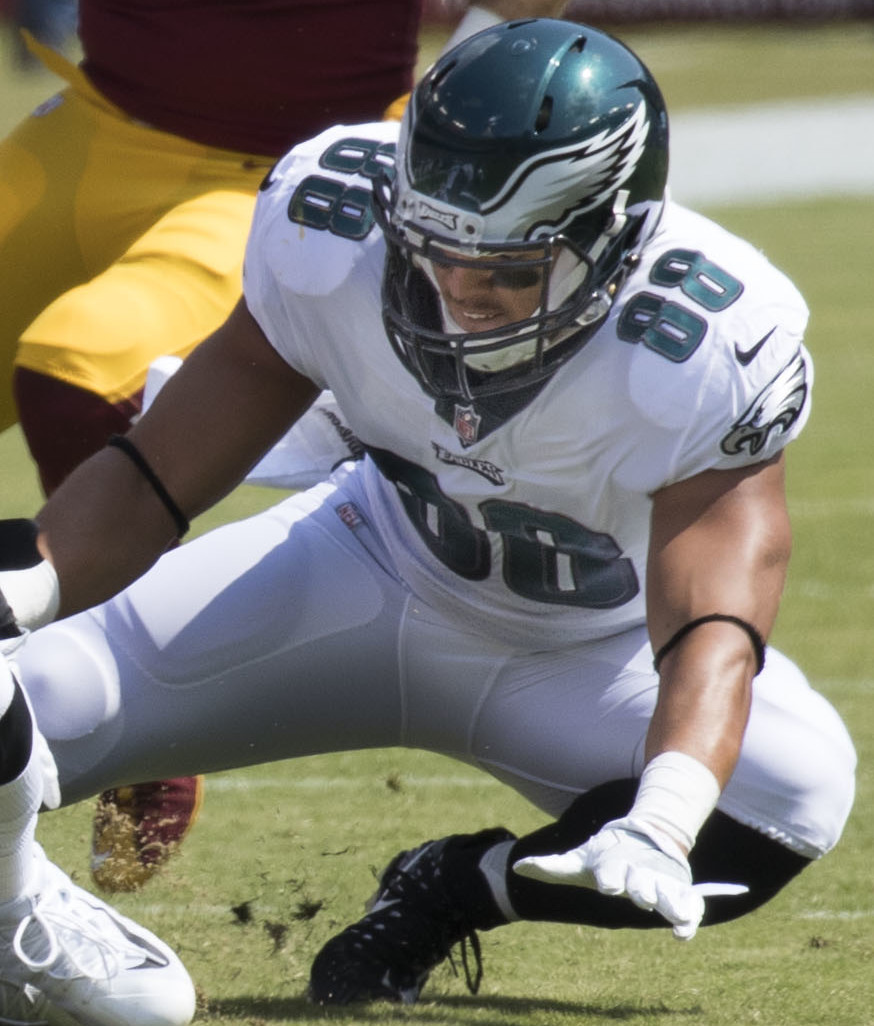
Burton with the Eagles in 2017

On March 7, 2017, the Eagles placed a second round restricted free agent tender on Burton. After receiving no offers, the Philadelphia Eagles signed him to his tender on April 3, 2017. He will receive a non-guaranteed salary of $2.74 million that corresponds with his second round tender.

On May 25, 2017, it was reported that Burton has opted to switch his jersey number from No. 47 to No. 88. He explained that his original number (47) was assigned to him so he could also play running back and tight end. He was slated to be the third tight end behind Ertz and Celek to start the regular season.

He played in the Philadelphia Eagles season-opening 30–17 victory over the Washington Redskins and recovered a fumble on a muffed punt by Redskins' wide receiver Jamison Crowder. On October 8, 2017, he caught two passes for 16-yards and made his second career touchdown reception on a 15-yard pass from Carson Wentz during a 34–7 victory over the Arizona Cardinals. On December 10, 2017, Burton recorded five receptions for 71 receiving yards and two touchdown receptions in the Eagles' NFC East Championship clinching 43–35 victory at the Los Angeles Rams.

In Super Bowl LII against the New England Patriots, Burton threw a touchdown pass on the famous Philly Special trick play to quarterback Nick Foles with 34 seconds remaining in the first half. The Eagles went on to win the Super Bowl 41–33. The Philly Special is now one of the most well known plays in Super Bowl history.

=== Chicago Bears ===
==== 2018 ====
On March 14, 2018, Burton signed a four-year, $32 million contract with the Chicago Bears. On September 9, he made his Bears debut, catching one pass for 15 yards against the Green Bay Packers. The next week against the Seattle Seahawks, Burton caught his first touchdown pass as a Bear. On September 30, Burton caught two passes for 86 yards and a touchdown against the Tampa Bay Buccaneers. The next week he caught another touchdown pass against the Miami Dolphins, his third of the season. In week 7 against the New England Patriots, Burton had 9 receptions for a career-high 126 yards and a touchdown. On November 4, Burton caught two passes for 28 yards and a touchdown against the Buffalo Bills.

He did not play in the Bears' playoff game against the Eagles after suffering a groin injury the night before. The Bears would lose to his former team 16–15.

Burton finished the season with 54 catches for 569 yards and six touchdowns. He received an overall grade of 69.5 from Pro Football Focus in 2018, which ranked as the 22nd highest grade among all qualifying tight ends, and was named as Pro Bowl alternate.

==== 2019 ====
On September 5, 2019, it was announced that Burton would be out with a groin strain in week 1 against the Green Bay Packers. Without Burton, the Bears lost to the Packers by a score of 10–3. Although he returned a week later for the Denver Broncos game, he continued to struggle with the groin injury throughout the season.

On November 16, he was placed on injured reserve, ending his year. He had 14 receptions for 84 yards in 2019. Burton's injury struggles continued when he had hip surgery in December.

On April 17, 2020, the Bears released Burton two years into his four-year deal, with a "failed physical" designation.

=== Indianapolis Colts ===
Burton signed with the Indianapolis Colts on April 22, 2020. Burton was reunited with Indianapolis Colts' head coach Frank Reich who he had previously played for while Reich was the Philadelphia Eagles' offensive coordinator. He was placed on injured reserve on September 7, 2020. He was activated on October 3, 2020. In Week 6, against the Cincinnati Bengals, he had four receptions for 58 receiving yards and a receiving touchdown to go along with a one-yard rushing touchdown in the 31–27 victory. After a week 7 bye, Burton rushed for a two-yard touchdown against the Detroit Lions in week 8. It was his second rushing touchdown in consecutive games. Burton became a free agent after the season and was not re-signed.

== Personal life ==
Burton is a Christian. Burton is married and has three children.

Burton has a younger brother named Clay Burton who also played tight end at Florida from 2012 to 2014. He went undrafted in the 2015 NFL draft and joined the Buffalo Bills shortly after, where he was released after his first training camp.

His grandfather Larry Burton, was an Olympic runner (1972 Olympics) and an All-American wide receiver for the Purdue Boilermakers; he spent five seasons in the NFL.
