= 2010 Florida Gators football team =

American college football season

2010 Florida Gators football

Outback Bowl champion

Outback Bowl, W 37–24 vs. Penn State
- Conference: Southeastern Conference
- Eastern Division
- Record: 8–5 (4–4 SEC)
- Head coach: Urban Meyer (6th season)
- Offensive coordinator: Steve Addazio (2nd season)
- Offensive scheme: Spread option
- Defensive coordinator: Teryl Austin (1st season)
- Base defense: 4–3
- Captains: Ahmad Black; A. J. Jones; Duke Lemmens; Mike Pouncey; Justin Trattou
- Home stadium: Ben Hill Griffin Stadium

2010 Southeastern Conference football standings
	Conf.			Overall
Team	W		L	W		L
Eastern Division
No. 22 South Carolina x	5	–	3	9	–	5
Florida	4	–	4	8	–	5
Georgia	3	–	5	6	–	7
Tennessee	3	–	5	6	–	7
Kentucky	2	–	6	6	–	7
Vanderbilt	1	–	7	2	–	10
Western Division
No. 1 Auburn x$#	8	–	0	14	–	0
No. 12 Arkansas %	6	–	2	10	–	3
No. 8 LSU	6	–	2	11	–	2
No. 10 Alabama	5	–	3	10	–	3
No. 15 Mississippi State	4	–	4	9	–	4
Ole Miss*	1	–	7	4	–	8
Championship: Auburn 56, South Carolina 17
# – BCS National Champion; $ – BCS representative as conference champion; % – BCS at-large representative; x – Division champion/co-champions; * Ole Miss vacated all wins due to NCAA violations.; Rankings from AP Poll

The 2010 Florida Gators football team represented the University of Florida in the sport of American football during the 2010 college football season. The Gators competed in the Football Bowl Subdivision (FBS) of the National Collegiate Athletic Association (NCAA) and the Eastern Division of the Southeastern Conference (SEC), and played their home games at Ben Hill Griffin Stadium on the university's Gainesville, Florida campus. The season was the sixth and final campaign for coach Urban Meyer, who led the Gators to a 37–24 Outback Bowl victory over coach Joe Paterno's Penn State Nittany Lions, and an overall win–loss record of 8–5 (.615).

== Preseason ==
In the annual Orange and Blue Spring Game, the blue team won 27–24. Quarterback John Brantley was 15/19 and threw for 201 yards and two touchdowns. Trey Burton was 12/18 for 120 yards, 1 INT, 1 TD, 123 yards on 10 carries with 2 TDs.

== Schedule ==
Date	Opponent	Rank	Site	TV	Result	Attendance
September 4	Miami (OH)*	No. 4	Ben Hill Griffin Stadium; Gainesville, FL	ESPN	W 34–12	90,178
September 11	South Florida*	No. 8	Ben Hill Griffin Stadium; Gainesville, FL	SECN	W 38–14	90,612
September 18	at Tennessee	No. 10	Neyland Stadium; Knoxville, TN (rivalry)	CBS	W 31–17	102,455
September 25	Kentucky	No. 9	Ben Hill Griffin Stadium; Gainesville, FL (rivalry)	ESPNU	W 48–14	90,547
October 2	at No. 1 Alabama	No. 7	Bryant–Denny Stadium; Tuscaloosa, AL (rivalry)	CBS	L 6–31	101,821
October 9	No. 12 LSU	No. 14	Ben Hill Griffin Stadium; Gainesville, FL (rivalry)	ESPN	L 29–33	90,721
October 16	Mississippi State^{†}	No. 22	Ben Hill Griffin Stadium; Gainesville, FL	ESPNU	L 7–10	90,517
October 30	vs. Georgia		EverBank Field; Jacksonville, FL (rivalry)	CBS	W 34–31 ^{OT}	84,444
November 6	at Vanderbilt		Vanderbilt Stadium; Nashville, TN	SECN	W 55–14	33,848
November 13	No. 22 South Carolina	No. 24	Ben Hill Griffin Stadium; Gainesville, FL	ESPN	L 14–36	90,885
November 20	Appalachian State*		Ben Hill Griffin Stadium; Gainesville, FL	ESPN3	W 48–10	90,119
November 27	at No. 22 Florida State*		Doak Campbell Stadium; Tallahassee, FL (rivalry)	ABC	L 7–31	82,324
January 1, 2011	vs. Penn State*		Raymond James Stadium; Tampa, FL (Outback Bowl)	ABC	W 37–24	60,574
*Non-conference game; ^{†}Homecoming; Rankings from AP Poll released prior to the game

Sources: 2012 Florida Football Media Guide, and GatorZone.com.

== Rankings ==
Ranking movements Legend: ██ Increase in ranking ██ Decrease in ranking — = Not ranked RV = Received votes
	Week															
Poll	Pre	1	2	3	4	5	6	7	8	9	10	11	12	13	14	Final
AP	4	8	10	9	7	14	22	—	RV	RV	24	—	—	—		
Coaches	3	6	7	8	7	12	22	—	—	RV	24	—	—	—		
Harris	Not released						22	RV	RV	RV	23	—	—	—		Not released
BCS	Not released							—	—	—	22	—	—	—		Not released

== Game summaries ==
=== Miami (OH) ===
	1	2	3	4	Total
RedHawks	3	3	3	3	12
#4 Gators	0	21	0	13	34

=== South Florida ===
	1	2	3	4	Total
Bulls	7	0	7	0	14
#8 Gators	0	7	21	10	38

=== Tennessee ===
	1	2	3	4	Total
#10 Gators	0	7	17	7	31
Volunteers	3	0	7	7	17

=== Kentucky ===
	1	2	3	4	Total
Wildcats	0	7	7	0	14
#9 Gators	14	7	13	14	48

=== Alabama ===
	1	2	3	4	Total
#7 Gators	0	3	3	0	6
#1 Crimson Tide	3	21	7	0	31

=== LSU ===
	1	2	3	4	Total
#12 Tigers	3	17	0	13	33
#14 Gators	0	14	0	15	29

=== Mississippi State ===
	1	2	3	4	Total
Bulldogs	10	0	0	0	10
#22 Gators	0	0	7	0	7

=== Georgia ===
First College Football overtime game in Jacksonville, Florida

	1	2	3	4	OT	Total
Gators	0	21	0	10	3	34
Bulldogs	0	7	3	21	0	31

=== Vanderbilt ===
	1	2	3	4	Total
Gators	7	34	14	0	55
Commodores	0	0	7	7	14

=== South Carolina ===
	1	2	3	4	Total
#22 Gamecocks	9	6	7	14	36
#24 Gators	7	0	0	7	14

=== Appalachian State ===
	1	2	3	4	Total
Mountaineers	0	0	3	7	10
Gators	21	7	14	6	48

=== Florida State ===
	1	2	3	4	Total
Gators	7	0	0	0	7
#22 Seminoles	3	21	7	0	31

== Personnel ==
=== Depth chart ===
(revised 10–30–10)

Defense

FS
Will Hill
Josh Evans
⋅

WLB	MLB	SLB
⋅	Jon Bostic	⋅
Brandon Hicks	Jelani Jenkins	⋅
⋅	⋅	⋅

SS
Ahmad Black
Matt Elam
⋅

CB
Janoris Jenkins
Joshua Shaw
Jaylen Watkins

DE	DT	DT	DE
Duke Lemmens	Terron Sanders	Omar Hunter	Justin Trattou
William Green	Jaye Howard	Lawrence Marsh	Earl Okine
Ronald Powell	Dominique Easley	Sharrif Floyd	Lerentee McCray

CB
Jeremy Brown
Moses Jenkins
Cody Riggs

Offense

WR
Deonte Thompson
Carl Moore
⋅

WR
Omarius Hines
Andre Debose
⋅

LT	LG	C	RG	RT
Xavier Nixon	Carl Johnson	Mike Pouncey	Maurice Hurt	Marcus Gilbert
Matt Patchan	Maurice Hurt	Sam Robey	Jon Halapio	David Young
⋅	⋅	⋅	⋅	⋅

TE
Jordan Reed
Desmond Parks
Gerald Christian

WR
Carl Moore
Frankie Hammond Jr.
⋅

QB
John Brantley
Trey Burton
Jordan Reed

RB
Jeffery Demps
Emmanuel Moody
Mike Gillislee

Special teams
PK Caleb Sturgis
PK Chas Henry
P Chas Henry
P David Lerner
KR Jeffery Demps
PR Janoris Jenkins
LS John Fairbanks
H Chas Henry

=== Roster ===
2010 Florida Gators roster
Quarterbacks: 12 John Brantley – (redshirt) Junior; 8 Trey Burton – Freshman; 10 Tyler Murphy – Freshman; 18 Ryan Parrish – Freshman; 14 Chandler Carr – Freshman; Running backs: 2 Jeff Demps – Junior; 21 Emmanuel Moody – (redshirt) Senior; 23 Mike Gillislee – Sophomore; 33 Mack Brown – Freshman; 44 Ean McQuay – (redshirt) Junior; 86 Phillip Bellino – Freshman; 28 Deandre Goins – Freshman; 37 Ben Sams – Freshman; 20 Malcolm Jones – Freshman; Fullbacks: 42 Steven Wilks – (redshirt) Junior; 45 T. J. Pridemore – (redshirt) Sophomore; Wide receivers: 3 Chris Rainey – (redshirt) Junior; 2 Cameron Parker – (redshirt) Freshman; 5 Chris Dunkley – Freshman; 6 Deonte Thompson – (redshirt) Junior; 7 Justin Williams – (redshirt) Senior; 9 Carl Moore – (redshirt) Senior; 18 T. J. Lawrence – (redshirt) Sophomore; 81 Robert Clark – Freshman; 82 Omarius Hines – (redshirt) Sophomore; 83 Solomon Patton – Freshman; 84 Quinton Dunbar – Freshman; 85 Frankie Hammond Jr. – (redshirt) Sophomore; 87 Josh Postell – (redshirt) Sophomore; 89 Stephen Alli – (redshirt) Freshman; Tight ends: 11 Jordan Reed – (redshirt) Freshman; 32 Gerald Christian – Freshman; 86 Will Hiler – Freshman; 80 Desmond Parks – (redshirt) Freshman; 88 Micheal McFarland – Freshman	Offensive line: 50 Sam Robey – (redshirt) Sophomore; 55 Mike Pouncey – Senior; 57 Carl Johnson – (redshirt) Senior; 58 Nick Alajajian – Sophomore; 60 William Steinmann – Junior; 62 Tucker Blanton – Freshman; 63 Cole Gilliam – (redshirt) Freshman; 64 Kyle Koehne – (redshirt) Freshman; 66 James Wilson – (redshirt) Junior; 67 Jon Halapio – (redshirt) Freshman; 71 Matt Patchan – Junior; 72 Jonotthan Harrison – (redshirt) Freshman; 73 Xavier Nixon – Sophomore; 74 Maurice Hurt – (redshirt) Senior; 75 Chaz Green – Freshman; 76 Marcus Gilbert – (redshirt) Senior; 77 Ian Silberman – Freshman; 78 David Young – (redshirt) Sophomore; Defensive line: 6 Jaye Howard – (redshirt) Junior; 7 Ronald Powell – Freshman; 34 Lerentee McCray – Junior; 44 Duke Lemmens – Senior; 47 Brandon Antwine – (redshirt) Senior; 48 Neiron Ball – Freshman; 57 Samuel Johnson – (redshirt) Sophomore; 65 Glen Watson – (redshirt) Sophomore; 58 Dominique Easley – Freshman; 61 Gary Beemer – (redshirt) Senior; 68 Leon Orr – Freshman; 70 Shawn Schmeider – (redshirt) Senior; 73 Sharrif Floyd – Freshman; 85 Lynden Trail – Freshman; 90 Lawrence Marsh – (redshirt) Senior; 91 Earl Okine – (redshirt) Sophomore; 92 Terron Sanders – (redshirt) Senior; 93 Kedric Johnson – (redshirt) Freshman; 94 Justin Trattou – Senior; 96 William Green – Junior; 99 Omar Hunter – (redshirt) Sophomore	Linebackers: 13 Dee Finley – Sophomore; 16 A. J. Jones – (redshirt) Senior; 23 Chris Martin – (redshirt) Freshman; 25 Gideon Ajagbe – Freshman; 26 Lorenzo Edwards – Senior; 33 Scott Peek – (redshirt) Sophomore; 40 Brandon Hicks – Senior; 43 Jelani Jenkins – (redshirt) Freshman; 46 Michael Ross – (redshirt) Sophomore; 49 Darrin Kitchens – Freshman; 51 Micheal Taylor – Freshman; 95 Hygens Succes – Sophomore; 45 Christian Estevez – Freshman; 59 Osmanny Gomez – Freshman; 52 Jon Bostic – Sophomore; Cornerbacks: 1 Janoris Jenkins – Junior; 14 Jaylen Watkins – Freshman; 23 Corey Henderson – (redshirt) Junior; 8 Jeremy Brown – (redshirt) Sophomore; 29 Joshua Shaw – Freshman; 31 Brian Biada – (redshirt) Freshman; 31 Cody Riggs – Freshman; 36 Moses Jenkins – Senior; 37 Brandon Sanders – Freshman; Safeties: 10 Will Hill – Junior; 22 Matt Elam – Freshman; 24 Josh Evans – (redshirt) Freshman; 35 Ahmad Black – Senior; 21 Brenden Bice – Junior; 34 Tim Clark – (redshirt) Freshman; 42 Miguel Carodine – (redshirt) Senior	Punters: 17 Chas Henry – Senior; 40 David Lerner – (redshirt) Sophomore; Kickers: 19 Caleb Sturgis – Junior; 47 John Crofoot – (redshirt) Freshman; 86 Eric Strack – (redshirt) Freshman; 98 Zack Brust –Junior; Long snappers: 50 Cody Hampton – (redshirt) Sophomore; 59 Christopher Guido – (redshirt) Freshman; 59 John Fairbanks – (redshirt) Senior

=== Coaching staff ===
Name	Current Responsibilities	Joined Staff	Alma mater
Urban Meyer	Head Coach	2005	Cincinnati
Steve Addazio	Offensive coordinator Offensive line	2005	Central Connecticut State
Zach Azzanni	Wide Receivers	2010	Central Michigan
Stan Drayton	Running backs	2010	Allegheny
D. J. Durkin	Outside linebackers Special Teams	2010	Bowling Green
Teryl Austin	Defensive coordinator	2010	Pittsburgh
Chuck Heater	Co-defensive coordinator Defensive backs	2005	Michigan
Scot Loeffler	Quarterbacks	2009	Michigan
Dan McCarney	Assistant head coach Defensive line	2008	Iowa
Brian White	Tight ends	2009	Harvard
Coleman Hutzler	Special teams coordinator Linebackers	2010	Middlebury

== Players drafted into the NFL ==
Round	Pick	Player	Position	NFL Club
1	15	Mike Pouncey	C	Miami Dolphins
2	63	Marcus Gilbert	OT	Pittsburgh Steelers
5	151	Ahmad Black	S	Tampa Bay Buccaneers
7	217	Maurice Hurt	OT	Washington Redskins
