= Justin Trattou =

American football player (born 1988)

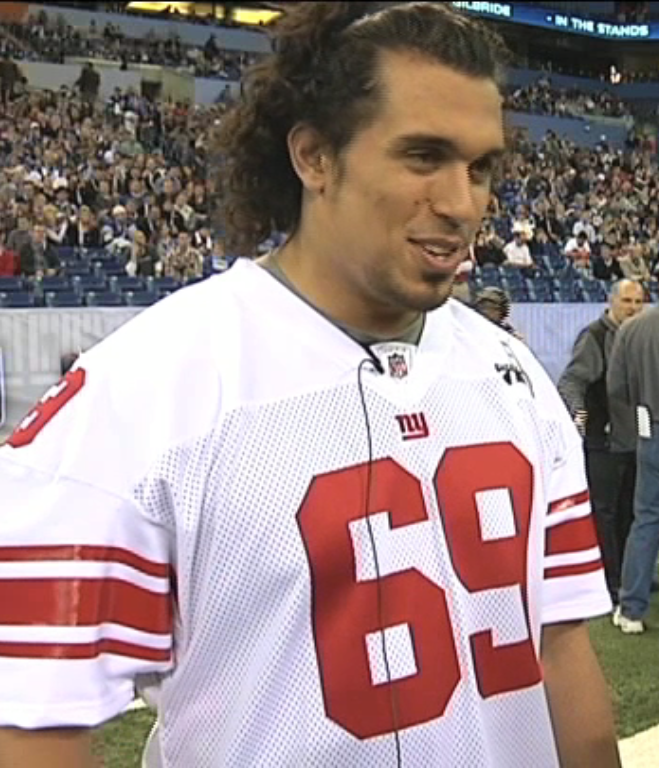
- Trattou at Super Bowl XLVI media day

No. 69, 94
- Position: Defensive end

Personal information
- Born: August 28, 1988 (age 38); Maywood, New Jersey, U.S.
- Listed height: 6 ft 4 in (1.93 m)
- Listed weight: 258 lb (117 kg)

Career information
- High school: Don Bosco Prep (Ramsey, New Jersey)
- College: Florida
- NFL draft: 2011: undrafted

Career history
- New York Giants (2011–2013); Minnesota Vikings (2013–2016); Tampa Bay Buccaneers (2017)

Awards and highlights
- Super Bowl champion (XLVI); BCS national champion (2009)

Career NFL statistics
- Total tackles: 42
- Interceptions: 2
- Stats at Pro Football Reference

Justin Trattou (born August 28, 1988) is an American former professional football player who was a defensive end in the National Football League (NFL). He played college football for the Florida Gators. He was signed by the New York Giants as an undrafted free agent in 2011. He later played with the Minnesota Vikings and Tampa Bay Buccaneers, retiring from the NFL in 2018. He was part of championship teams at all three levels of his career in football.

== Early life ==
Trattou was born in Maywood, New Jersey. He lived in Franklin Lakes, New Jersey and attended Don Bosco Preparatory High School in Ramsey, where he was named all-state during both his junior and senior years. He collected 65 tackles, eight sacks and an interception as a sophomore. He helped lead Don Bosco to the state final his junior year by recording 96 tackles and totaling 11 sacks. As a senior playing for the Don Bosco Ironmen high school football team, he tallied 82 tackles and 17 sacks, and helped lead Don Bosco to a perfect 12–0 record and its first state title since 2003. He was chosen as a U.S. Army All-American and was also honored at the High School Heisman ceremony.

Regarded as a four-star recruit by Rivals.com, Trattou was ranked fourth among New Jersey’s Top 30 prospects. He was rated fourth among defensive ends by Scout.com. He was also selected to be on the ESPN 150 list. He chose Florida over Notre Dame and committed on January 25, 2007. He also had scholarship offers from Ohio State, Boston College and Penn State, among others.

== College career ==
Trattou accepted an athletic scholarship to attend the University of Florida, where he played for coach Urban Meyer's Florida Gators football team from 2007 to 2010. He played in 52 games at Florida, including 31 starts. For his career, he amassed 121 tackles (75 solo, 47 assisted), 26.0 tackles for loss, 8.5 sacks, three interceptions, one forced fumble, one fumble recovery, one pass breakup and three pass deflections.

During his sophomore season, the Gators won a Southeastern Conference (SEC) championship and the 2009 BCS National Championship Game. As a senior team captain in 2010, he memorably returned an interception thirty-five yards for a touchdown, and was the recipient of the Gators' Fergie Ferguson Award, recognizing "the senior football player who displays outstanding leadership, character and courage." In his four seasons as a Gator, he played in fifty-two games, and started thirty-one of them, including all thirteen games during his senior year.

== Professional career ==
Pre-draft measurables
Height	Weight	40-yard dash	10-yard split	20-yard split	20-yard shuttle	Three-cone drill	Vertical jump	Bench press
6 ft 3 in (1.91 m)	249 lb (113 kg)	4.72 s	1.62 s	2.77 s	4.47 s	7.12 s	34 in (0.86 m)	22 reps
All values from Pro Day

=== New York Giants ===
The New York Giants signed Trattou as an undrafted free agent in 2011, and he appeared in six regular season games during his rookie season. He was waived/injured on August 16, 2012, and subsequently reverted to injured reserve on August 18.

=== Minnesota Vikings ===
On October 9, 2013, Trattou was signed by the Minnesota Vikings. On December 14, Trattou was re-signed by the Minnesota Vikings.

On September 20, 2015, Trattou got his first career interception against the Detroit Lions during a Vikings 26–16 victory.

=== Tampa Bay Buccaneers ===
On July 28, 2017, Trattou signed with the Tampa Bay Buccaneers. He was placed on injured reserve on August 28.

== Personal life ==
Trattou majored in sports management at the University of Florida and was named twice to SEC's academic honor roll.
