= List of Florida Gators starting quarterbacks =

This list of Florida Gators starting quarterbacks includes members of the Florida Gators football team who have started at the quarterback position in one or more regular season or post-season games. The Florida Gators represent the University of Florida in the sport of American football, and they compete in the Football Bowl Subdivision (FBS) of the National Collegiate Athletic Association (NCAA) and the Eastern Division of the Southeastern Conference (SEC). Florida Gators quarterbacks have led their teams to 689 wins, forty post-season bowl games, eight SEC championships, and three consensus national championships.

Three Gators quarterbacks have won the Heisman Trophy: Steve Spurrier (1966), Danny Wuerffel (1996), and Tim Tebow (2007). Five have been recognized as first-team All-Americans: Spurrier (1966), John Reaves (1971), Wuerffel (1996), Rex Grossman (2000), and Tebow (2007). Eighteen have been inducted into the University of Florida Athletic Hall of Fame, including sixteen recognized as "Gator Greats" for their college sports careers, and two as "Distinguished Lettermen" for their post-college career achievements. Two former Gators quarterbacks have returned to lead the Gators as their head coach: Doug Dickey (1970–78) and Steve Spurrier (1990–2001).

== Main starting quarterbacks ==
=== 1906 to 1911 ===
The following players were the predominant quarters for the Gators each season the team was a non-conference independent team, following the birth of Florida football.

Name	Years started	Notability	References
Charlie Thompson	1906–1908	The university's first quarterback.	
Charlie Bartleson	1908	He ran in the touchdown to tie Stetson. Freshman Dummy Taylor added the extra point to win 6–5.	
Chippy Edgerton	1909–1910		
Bob W. Shackleford	1910–1911	Once picked second-team for an all-time Florida team in 1927, Shackleford was the quarterback on the 1911 team first dubbed "Gators" and which dubbed itself the "champions of South Carolina." He was later Rex Farrior's law partner.	

=== 1912 to 1921 ===
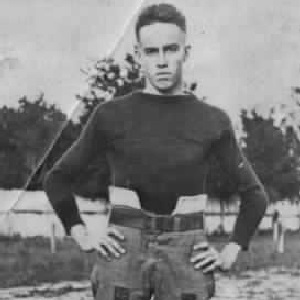
Rammy Ramsdell

The following quarterbacks were the predominant quarters for the Gators each season after they joined the Southern Intercollegiate Athletic Association until the establishment of the Southern Conference.

Name	Years started	Notability	References
Harvey Hester	1912	"Harvey" scored 7 touchdowns in the 144–0 win over Florida-Southern in 1913. He coached Wofford in 1915.	
George Mosley	1913		
Rammy Ramsdell	1913–1915	University of Florida Athletic Hall of Fame. Once picked at the position for an all-time Florida team in 1927. The first scholarship athlete at UF.	
Artie Fuller	1916–1917	Fuller was a fullback before he was a quarterback.	
Horace Loomis	1917		
?	1918	Due to World War I and the Spanish flu, the Gators played just one game, against Camp Johnston. No game reports have surfaced.	
B. Anderson	1919–1920	Rondo Hatton was Anderson's backup.	
T. Hoyt Carlton	1920–1921		
Bill Renfroe	1921		
George Stanley	1921		

=== 1922 to 1932 ===
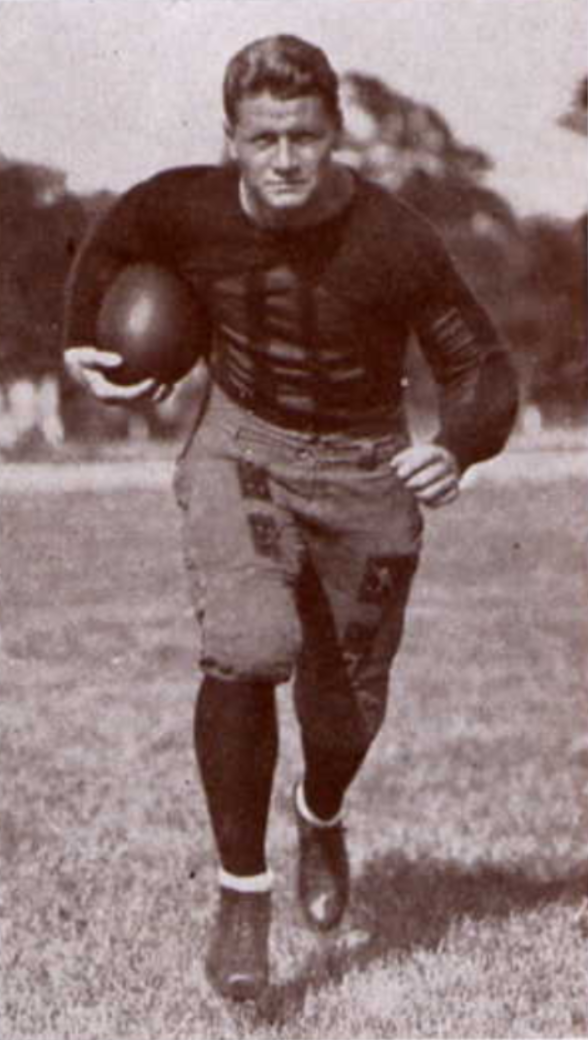
Edgar Jones

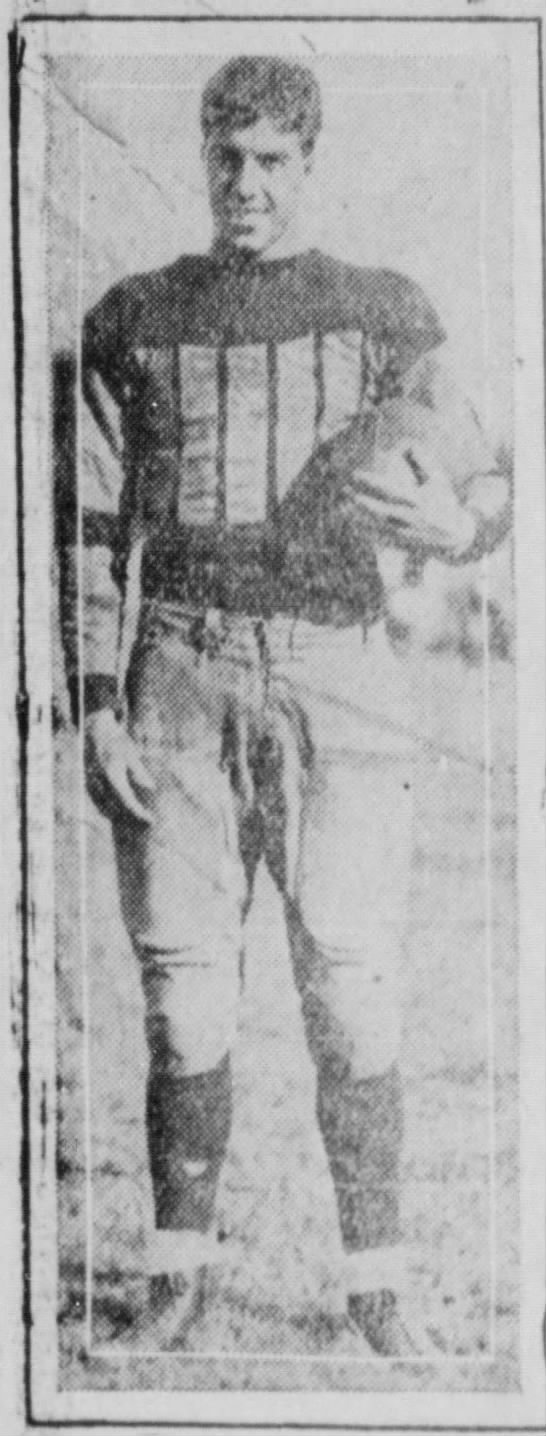
Clyde Crabtree

The following quarterbacks were the predominant quarters for the Gators each season after the establishment of the Southern Conference until the establishment of the Southeastern Conference.

Name	Years started	Notability	References
Joseph Barchan	1922		
Stewart Pomeroy	1922	He started against Harvard.	
Edgar C. Jones	1923–1925	He scored all of UF's points in the 16 to 6 upset victory to close the season in 1923 over conference leading Alabama. In 1925, Jones set a Florida Gators football single-season scoring record (108 points) that stood for 44 years. Twice All-Southern. University of Florida Athletic Hall of Fame. He was the university's athletic director from 1930 to 1936.	
Johnnie Murphree	1924		
Spic Stanley	1925		
Goof Bowyer	1926–1928	Captain of 1928 team which led the nation in scoring with 336 points. He was later a coach, including the Gators' backfield coach in 1933. University of Florida Athletics Hall of Fame.	
Carl Brumbaugh	1927	Member of "Phantom Four" backfield of 1928 which led the nation in scoring. National Football League player.	
Speedy Walker	1927	University of Florida Athletics Hall of Fame	
Clyde Crabtree	1927–1929	"Cannonball" was head of the "Phantom Four" backfield of 1928 which led the nation in scoring. He was ambidextrous and could pass or punt equally well with either hand or foot, while on the run or stationary. All-Southern. University of Florida Athletic Hall of Fame. National Football League player.	
Monk Dorsett	1930–1932		

=== 1933 to present ===
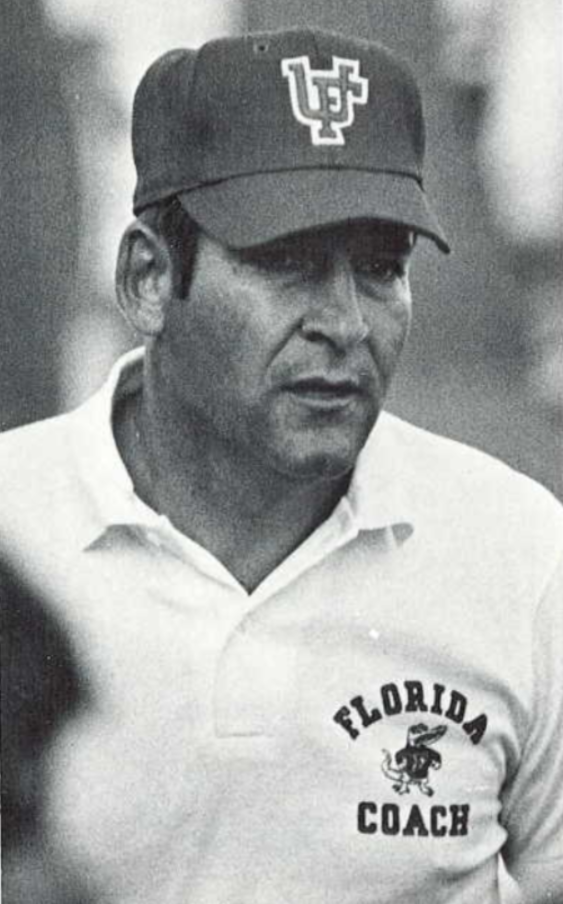
Doug Dickey

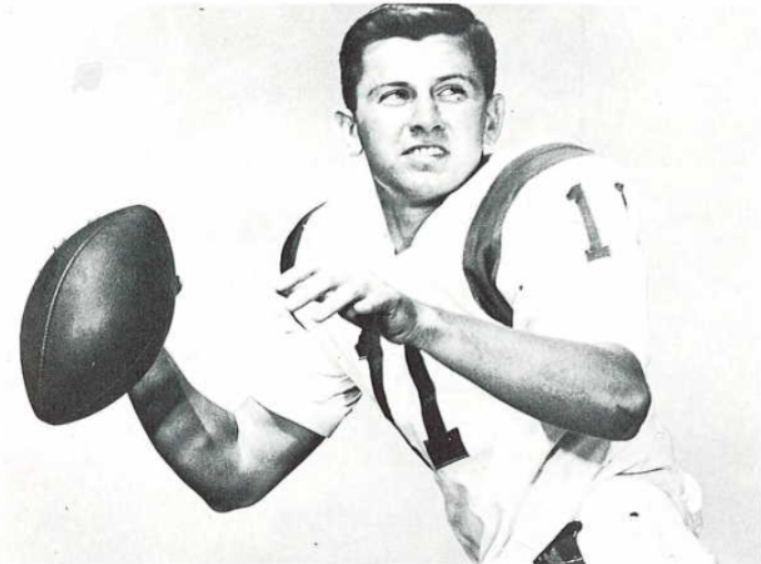
Steve Spurrier

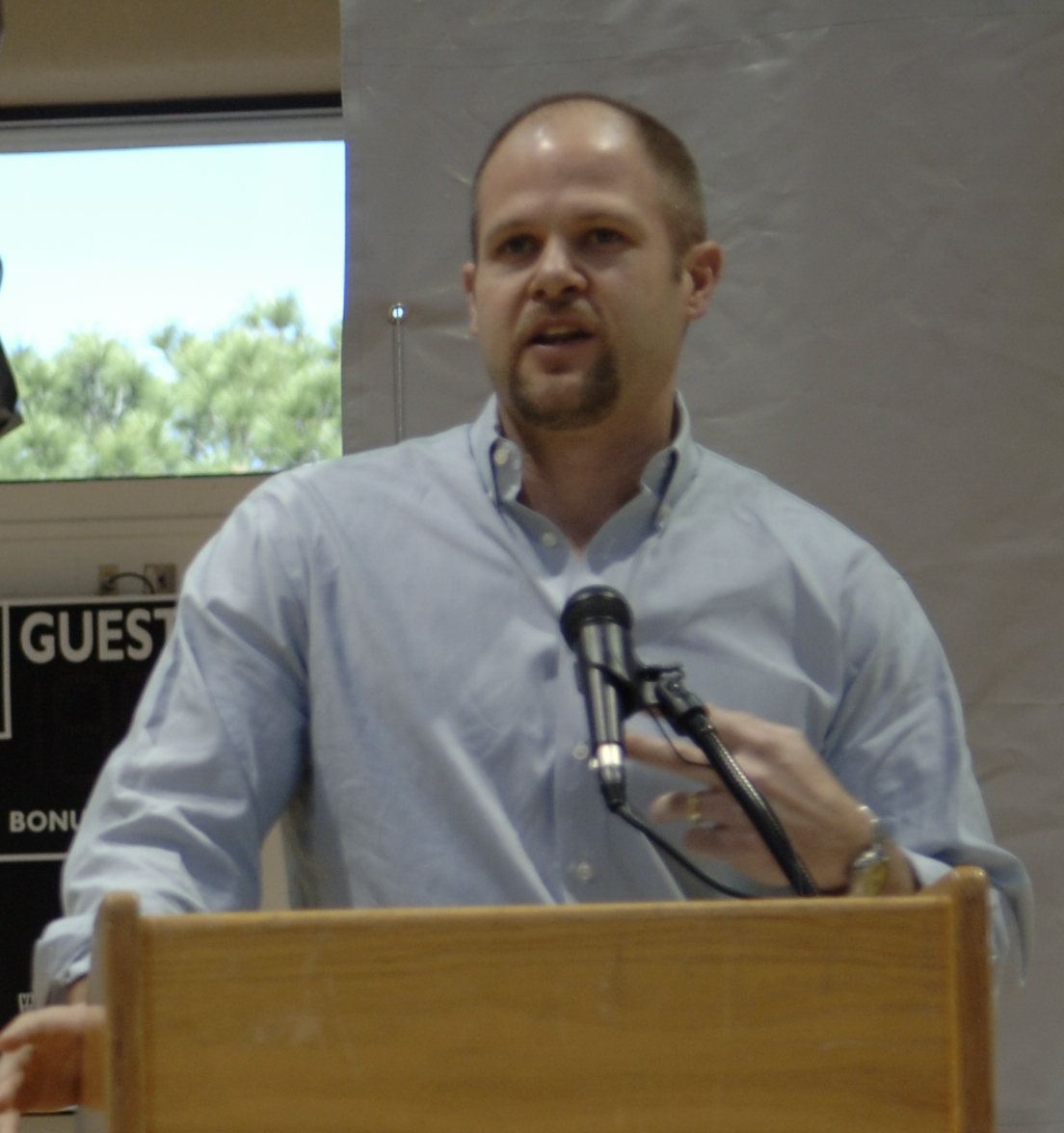
Danny Wuerffel

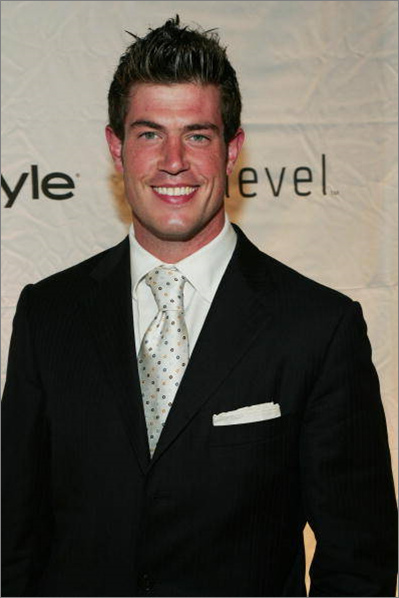
Jesse Palmer

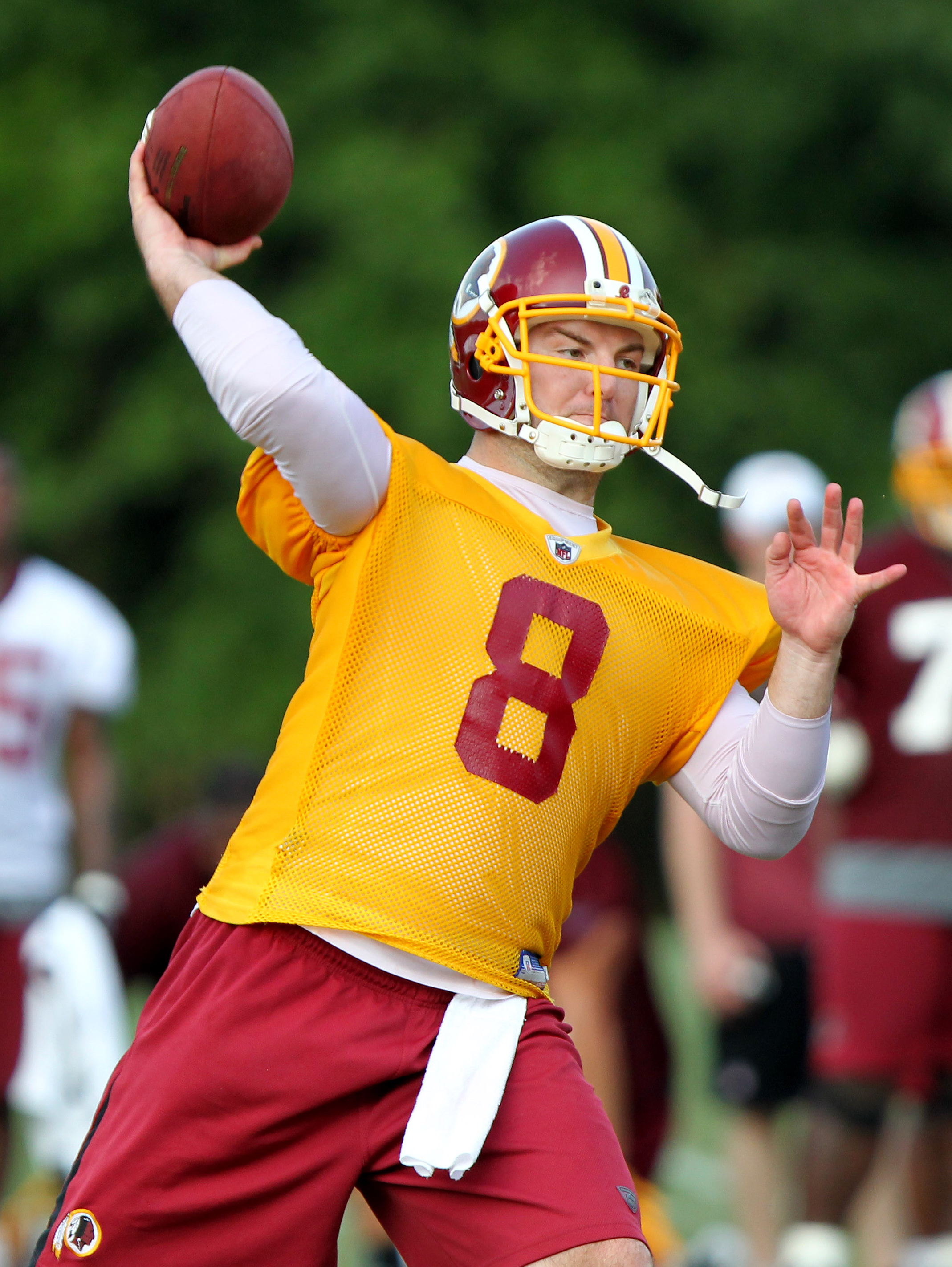
Rex Grossman practicing with the Washington Redskins

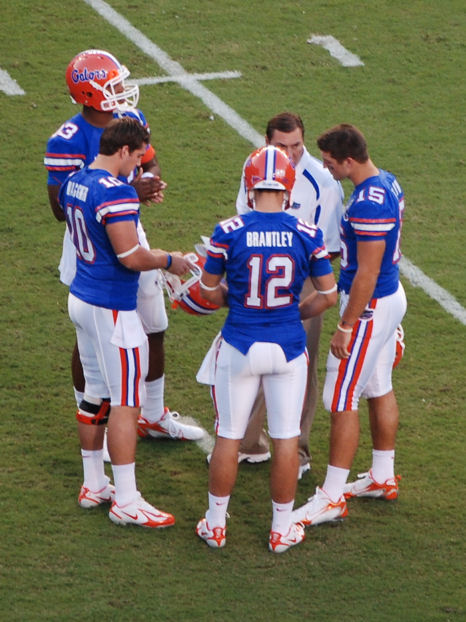
QBs in 2007. Tebow is on the right. Brantley in the center.

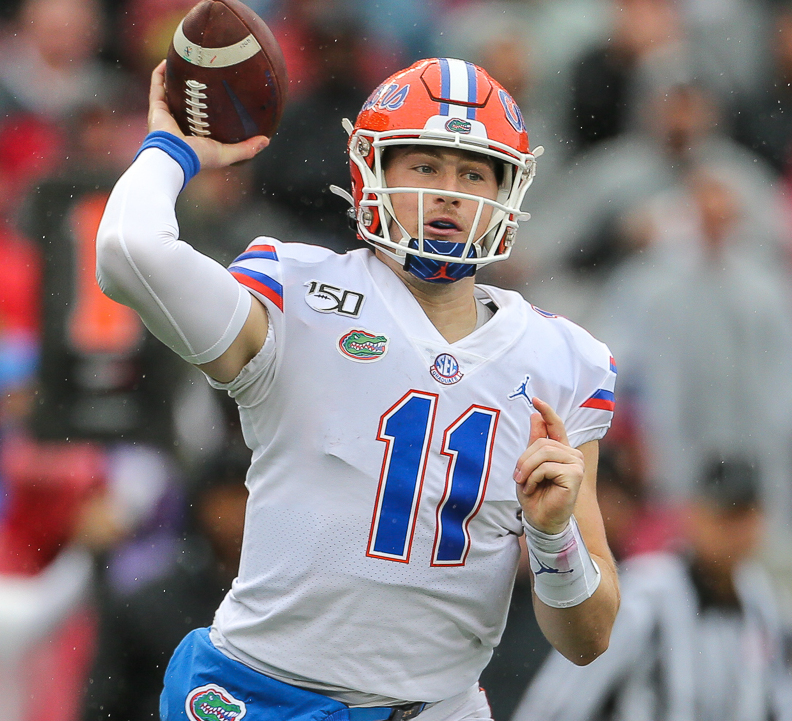
Kyle Trask

The following quarterbacks were the starters and/or leading passer for the Gators each season since joining the Southeastern Conference in 1933.

Name	Years started	Notability	References
Sam Davis	1933	The Tampa native was the first captain and quarterback since Bowyer. Davis was then rated the greatest all-around athlete ever to come out of Plant High School.	
Wally Brown	1934	2nd-team All-SEC.	
Ken Eppert	1935		
Bill Stephens	1935		
Bob Ivey	1936	His backup was Tiger Mayberry.	
Ed Manning	1936		
Paul Brock	1936		
Jack Blalock	1937–1938	Replaced Brock.	
Tex Hanna	1939		
Bill Latsko	1940–1942	Grandfather of Billy Latsko.	
Buddy Carte	1944	From Tampa. He was in the backfield with UF Hall of Fame member Bobby Forbes.	
Earl Scarborough	1945	From Jacksonville, he later coached the freshman team.	
Angus Williams	1945, 1948–1950	Led the "Golden Era" teams which defeated Georgia in 1949. He was later a well known insurance executive in Tampa.	
Billy Parker	1946	Wendell "Billy" Parker spent 30 years as an educator and 20 years on the Duval County School Board. The Gators failed to win a single game in 1946, but Parker led the nation's 7th best passing attack.	
Doug Belden	1947–1948		
Haywood Sullivan	1950–1951	University of Florida Athletic Hall of Fame. The first sophomore in SEC history to throw for more than 1,000 yards in a season. Major League Baseball player, manager, general manager, and club owner with the Boston Red Sox. Boston Red Sox Hall of Fame.	
Rick Casares	1952	University of Florida Athletic Hall of Fame; played multiple running back positions.	
Doug Dickey	1952–1953	Climbed from seventh-string to starter after Sullivan left for the Major Leagues. Dickey also coached Florida from 1970 to 1978. Long time AD at Univ. of Tennessee. Tennessee Sports Hall of Fame. University of Florida Athletic Hall of Fame. College Football Hall of Fame.	
Dick Allen	1954; 1959		
Bobby Lance	1955		
Jimmy Dunn	1956–1958	University of Florida Athletic Hall of Fame.	
Larry Libertore	1960–1962	University of Florida Athletic Hall of Fame.	
Tom Batten	1961		
Tom Shannon	1962–1964	University of Florida Athletic Hall of Fame.	
Steve Spurrier	1964–1966	Coached UF to its first national championship in 1996, and was its first Heisman Trophy winner in 1966. Recognized by The Gainesville Sun as the second greatest player from the first century of the Gators football program. University of Florida Athletic Hall of Fame.	
Jack Eckdahl	1967-1968	After the third game of the season against LSU in 1967 Eckdahl had a season ending injury, breaking his leg in practice.	
Larry Rentz	1967–1968		
John Reaves	1969–1971	First-team All-SEC (1969). First-team All-American (1971). Florida–Georgia Hall of Fame. University of Florida Athletic Hall of Fame. National Football League player. Finished Florida career as all-time NCAA leader in passing yards. Played 11 seasons in the NFL and two in the USFL.	
Chan Gailey	1972	Current offensive coordinator for the Miami Dolphins. Former head coach of the Dallas Cowboys and the Buffalo Bills.	
David Bowden	1972–1973		
Don Gaffney	1973–1975	He was the first African-American to play quarterback for the Florida Gators football team of the University of Florida, and was later elected to the Florida House of Representatives.	
Jimmy Fisher	1975–1976		
Bill Kynes	1976	Son of James W. Kynes. University of Florida Athletic Hall of Fame. Ended football career early to become a Rhodes Scholar.	
Terry LeCount	1977		
Tim Groves	1978–1979		
John Brantley, III	1978	Father of John Brantley.	
Tyrone Young	1979		
Johnell Brown	1979		
Larry Ochab	1979–1980		
Bob Hewko	1980–1982	Recruited by Steve Spurrier. Started first 3 games of 1980 season, helping to lead major turnaround under offensive coordinator Mike Shanahan. Injured knee in third game and replaced by Wayne Peace.	
Wayne Peace	1980–1983	University of Florida Athletic Hall of Fame.	
Kerwin Bell	1984–1987	SEC Player of the Year (1984). First-team All-SEC (1985). Honorable mention All-American (1985, 1986). University of Florida Athletic Hall of Fame. Florida–Georgia Hall of Fame. Went on to be successful college coach; currently head coach at Valdosta State.	
Rodney Brewer	1986	Also played on Gator baseball team; spent four years with the St. Louis Cardinals in Major League Baseball.	
Kyle Morris	1988–1989		
Herbert Perry	1988	Also a key member of the baseball team. Played nine seasons in Major League Baseball. Grew up in same small town (Mayo, Florida) as predecessor Kerwin Bell.	
Lex Smith	1989		
Donald Douglas	1989	Transferred to the University of Houston.	
Shane Matthews	1990–1992	Led UF to its first official SEC championship (1991). First Team All-SEC (1990-92). SEC Player of the Year (1990, 1991). SEC Player of the Year (1990, 1991). Second-team All-American (1992). Florida–Georgia Hall of Fame. University of Florida Athletic Hall of Fame.	
Terry Dean	1993–1994	Threw six touchdown passes against Louisiana-Lafayette.	
Danny Wuerffel	1993–1996	Led UF to its first national championship in 1996. 1996 Heisman Trophy Winner. College Football Hall of Fame. Florida–Georgia Hall of Fame. University of Florida Athletic Hall of Fame.	
Eric Kresser	1995	Transferred to Marshall University, where he threw to Randy Moss. National and Canadian Football League player.	
Doug Johnson	1997–1999	Florida–Georgia Hall of Fame. Played five seasons in the NFL, mostly for Atlanta. Drafted by Tampa Bay Rays and played portions of two seasons in their minor league system.	
Noah Brindise	1997	Started his career as a walk-on.	
Jesse Palmer	1997–2000	ESPN college football analyst. Contestant on ABC's The Bachelor. NFL player.	
Rex Grossman	2000–2002	Consensus All-American. 2001 Heisman Trophy runner-up. Associated Press Player of the Year. Recognized by the Gainesville Sun in 2006 as the No. 10 all-time Gator. University of Florida Athletic Hall of Fame.	
Brock Berlin	2001	Transferred to Miami.	
Ingle Martin	2003	Transferred to Furman. Spent four seasons with five different NFL teams 2006-2009, played for New York of the UFL in 2009.	
Chris Leak	2003–2006	Led the Gators to the 2006 BCS National Championship, also named MVP. Florida career leader in passing yards (11,213).	
Tim Tebow	2007–2009	Part of two National and SEC Championships (2006, 2008). Twice All-American, thrice All-SEC. 2007 Heisman Trophy winner. SEC Offensive Player of the Year (2008). At the end of his college career, Tebow held five NCAA, 14 SEC, and 28 UF statistical records. He was the SEC's all-time leader in career passing efficiency (170.8), completion percentage (67.1%), passing touchdown to interception ratio (5.5 to 1), rushing yards by a quarterback (2947), rushing touchdowns (any position) (57), and total touchdowns responsible for (145). Played three seasons in NFL. Played minor league baseball for the New York Mets. Signed with the Jacksonville Jaguars as a tight end, released August 2021.	
John Brantley	2010–2011	Son of John Brantley, III.	
Jacoby Brissett	2011–2012	Transferred to North Carolina State.	
Jeff Driskel	2012–2014	Transferred to Louisiana Tech. Drafted and signed by the Boston Red Sox but never played professional baseball.	
Tyler Murphy	2013	Transferred to Boston College.	
Skyler Mornhinweg	2013	Son of Marty Mornhinweg. Transferred to Columbia.	
Treon Harris	2014–2015	Transferred to Tennessee State in 2016.	
Will Grier	2015	Suspended for PEDs. Transferred to West Virginia.	
Luke Del Rio	2016-2017	Son of Jack Del Rio. Transferred from Oregon State. Offensive quality control coach in the NFL for Washington.	
Austin Appleby	2016	Graduate transfer from Purdue.	
Feleipe Franks	2017-2019	Transferred to Arkansas.	
Malik Zaire	2017	Graduate transfer from Notre Dame.	
Kyle Trask	2019–2020	Started nine games in 2019 and all ten games in 2020. Holds UF single-season passing touchdowns record (40). Drafted by the Super Bowl Champion Tampa Bay Buccaneers in the 2021 draft, 64th overall pick in round 2.	
Emory Jones	2021	Transferred to Arizona State.	
Anthony Richardson	2021–2022	Played in rotation with Emory Jones in 2021. Drafted #4 overall in the 2023 NFL draft.	
Jack Miller III	2022	Transfer from Ohio State. Started the Las Vegas Bowl.	
Graham Mertz	2023–2024	Transfer from Wisconsin.	
Max Brown	2023	Transferred to Charlotte.	
DJ Lagway	2024–2025	Transferred to Baylor.	
Aaron Philo	2026-	Transfer from Georgia Tech	

== Bibliography ==
- McEwen, Tom (1974). The Gators: A Story of Florida Football. Huntsville, Alabama: The Strode Publishers. ISBN 0-87397-025-X.
