= Ahmad Black =

American football player (born 1988)

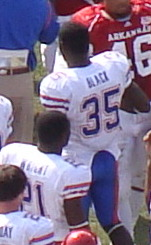
- Black with the Florida Gators in 2008

No. 43
- Position: Safety

Personal information
- Born: December 12, 1988 (age 37); Lakeland, Florida, U.S.
- Listed height: 5 ft 9 in (1.75 m)
- Listed weight: 184 lb (83 kg)

Career information
- High school: Lakeland
- College: Florida
- NFL draft: 2011: 5th round, 151st overall pick

Career history
- Tampa Bay Buccaneers (2011–2013)

Awards and highlights
- BCS national champion (2009); First-team All-American (2010); First-team All-SEC (2010); Second-team All-SEC (2008)

Career NFL statistics
- Total tackles: 53
- Forced fumbles: 2
- Fumble recoveries: 1
- Pass deflections: 5
- Interceptions: 2
- Stats at Pro Football Reference

Ahmad Black (born December 12, 1988) is an American former professional football player who was a safety for the Tampa Bay Buccaneers of the National Football League (NFL). He played college football for the Florida Gators, and was a member of a BCS National Championship team. Black was selected by the Buccaneers in the fifth round of the 2011 NFL draft. Black officially retired from the NFL on April 9, 2017.

== Early life ==
Black was born in Lakeland, Florida, and he attended Lawton Chiles Middle Academy and later Lakeland High School. As a sophomore playing for the Florida Class 5A high school football powerhouse Lakeland Dreadnaughts, he recorded 71 tackles and 10 interceptions, and 71 tackles with six interceptions as a junior. As a Dreadnaught senior, Black recorded 82 tackles and four interceptions.

== College career ==
Black accepted an athletic scholarship to attend the University of Florida in Gainesville, Florida, where he played for coach Urban Meyer's Florida Gators football team from 2007 to 2010.

As a freshman, Black played in seven games as a cornerback for the Gators and recorded seven tackles. As a sophomore in 2008, Black started all 14 games at strong safety and made 59 tackles and seven interceptions for 191 return yards and two touchdowns, and was recognized as a second-team All-Southeastern Conference (SEC) selection. Black caught his seventh interception in the Gators' 24–14 win over the Oklahoma Sooners in the 2009 BCS National Championship Game.

Following his senior season in 2010, he was a first-team All-SEC selection and received first-team All-American honors from Rivals.com and second-team honors from the Associated Press. To end his college career, he had two interceptions, returning one 80 yards for a touchdown against Penn State in the Outback Bowl, earning Player of the Game honors.

== Professional career ==
Pre-draft measurables
Height	Weight	Arm length	Hand span	Wingspan	40-yard dash	10-yard split	20-yard split	20-yard shuttle	Three-cone drill	Vertical jump	Broad jump	Bench press
5 ft 9 1/2 in (1.77 m)	184 lb (83 kg)	31 in (0.79 m)	9 7/8 in (0.25 m)	6 ft 1 5/8 in (1.87 m)	4.74 s	1.62 s	2.69 s	4.12 s	6.77 s	36.5 in (0.93 m)	9 ft 11 in (3.02 m)	18 reps
All values from NFL Combine/Pro Day

Black was selected in the fifth round of the 2011 NFL draft with the 151st overall pick by the Tampa Bay Buccaneers. He was cut on September 3, 2011, re-signed to the Buccaneers' practice squad two days later, and later activated to the active roster. As a rookie, he appeared in four games during the 2011 regular season, with five tackles and a recovered fumble. On October 1, 2013, he was released again by the Buccaneers, and was eligible for free agency after clearing waivers.

== NFL statistics ==
Year	Team	Games		Tackles				Fumbles			Interceptions					
Year	Team	G	GS	Comb	Total	Ast	Sack	FF	FR	Yds	Int	Yds	Avg	Lng	TD	PD
2011	TAM	04	00	5	3	2	0.0	0	1	0	0	0	0	0	0	0
2012	TAM	16	01	36	30	6	0.0	1	0	0	2	34	17	34	0	5
2013	TAM	04	02	12	8	4	0.0	0	0	0	0	0	0	0	0	0
Career		24	3	53	41	12	0.0	1	1	0	2	34	17	34	0	5

== Post-NFL career ==
On May 23, 2021, Black was named the defensive backs coach at Mulberry High School in Mulberry, Florida. On March 2, 2022, Black was named the defensive backs/safeties coach at Lakeland High School in Lakeland, Florida.

Black currently is employed by Lakeland Regional Health and advocates for healthcare in the Polk County community.

== Personal life ==
On November 6, 2012, the Tampa Bay Times reported that Black was cited by police for possession of less than 20 grams of marijuana.

== See also ==
- List of Florida Gators football All-Americans
- List of Florida Gators in the NFL draft
