= Ronald Powell =

American football player (1991–2024)

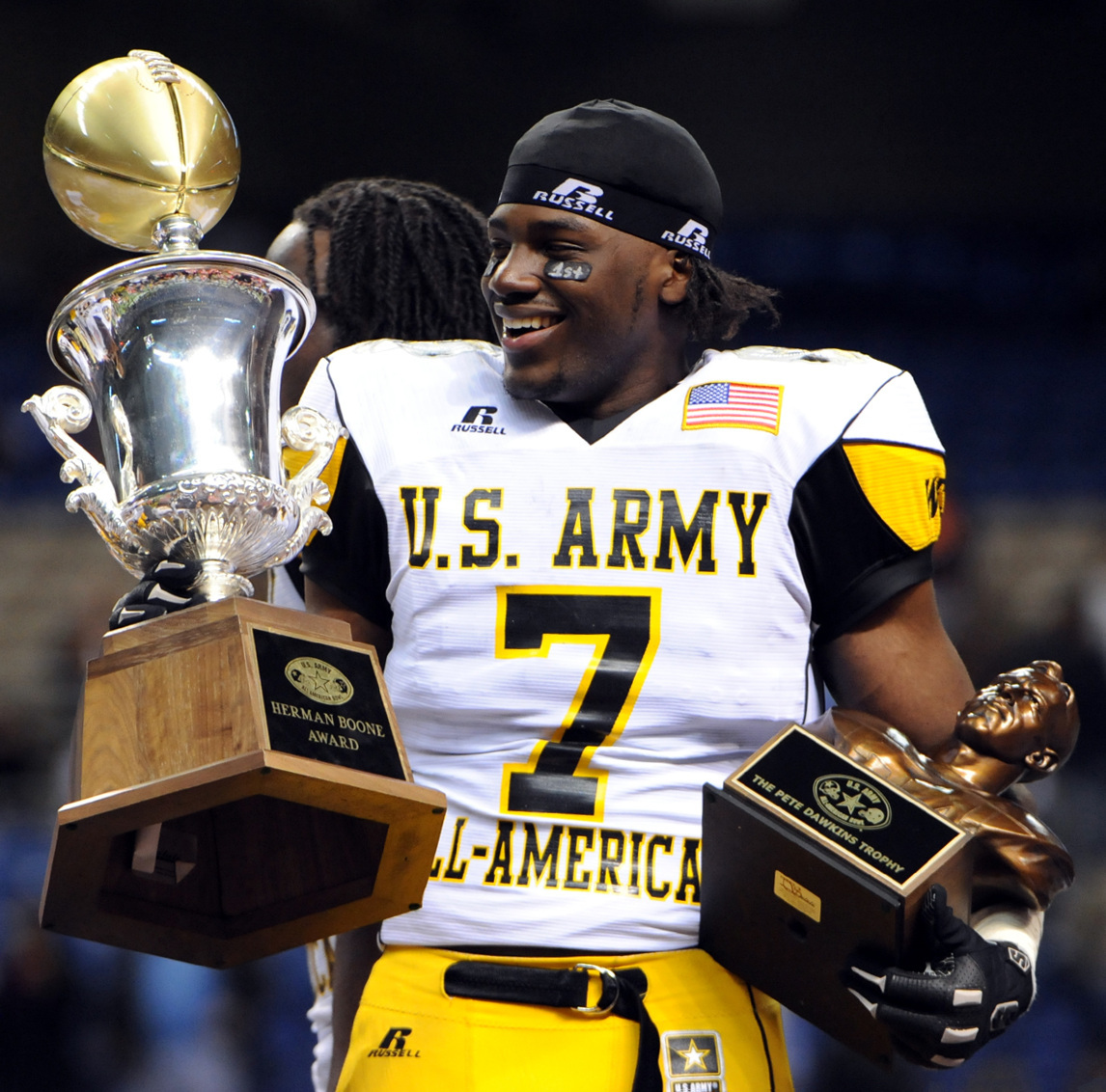
- Powell at the 2010 U.S. Army All-American Bowl

No. 56
- Position: Linebacker

Personal information
- Born: May 14, 1991; Riverside, California, U.S.
- Died: January 15, 2024 (aged 32)
- Listed height: 6 ft 3 in (1.91 m)
- Listed weight: 237 lb (108 kg)

Career information
- High school: Rancho Verde (Moreno Valley, California)
- College: Florida (2010–2014)
- NFL draft: 2014: 5th round, 169th overall pick

Career history
- New Orleans Saints (2014); Tampa Bay Buccaneers (2015)*; Chicago Bears (2016)*; Seattle Seahawks (2016); Orlando Apollos (2019)
- * Offseason or practice squad member only

Career NFL statistics
- Total tackles: 2
- Stats at Pro Football Reference

Ronald Fredrick Powell (May 14, 1991 – January 15, 2024) was an American professional football player who was a linebacker for the New Orleans Saints of the National Football League (NFL). He played college football for the Florida Gators. He was selected by the Saints in the fifth round of the 2014 NFL draft.

== Early life ==
A native of Moreno Valley, California, Powell attended Rancho Verde High School, where he played defensive end, linebacker and tight end. In his senior season, he totaled over 80 tackles, 13 sacks and 28 tackles for losses on defense, while averaging over 15 yards per catch on offense. He was named a High School All-American by USA Today, Parade and EA Sports. He was selected to play in the 2010 U.S. Army All-American Bowl, where he was voted MVP.

Regarded as a five-star college recruit by Rivals.com, Powell was listed as the No. 1 prospect (regardless of position) in the class of 2010.

== College career ==
Powell accepted an athletic scholarship to attend the University of Florida in Gainesville, Florida, where he was a member of coach Urban Meyer and coach Will Muschamp's Florida Gators football teams from 2010 to 2013. As a freshman in 2010, he played in 13 games and made one start. In his sophomore year, he became a regular starter for the Gators, playing and starting in 12 games. In an injury-plagued junior year, he tore his left ACL two different times, first in the spring Orange and Blue game, and again during rehabilitation. For the 2012 season, he earned a medical redshirt. In 2013, Powell played in 11 games and started in eight.

== Professional career ==
Pre-draft measurables
| Height | Weight | Arm length | Hand span | 40-yard dash | 10-yard split | 20-yard split | Vertical jump | Broad jump | Bench press |
|---|---|---|---|---|---|---|---|---|---|
| 6 ft 3 1/8 in (1.91 m) | 237 lb (108 kg) | 32 1/2 in (0.83 m) | 9 3/8 in (0.24 m) | 4.65 s | 1.62 s | 2.71 s | 35.5 in (0.90 m) | 9 ft 6 in (2.90 m) | 24 reps |
All values from NFL Combine/Pro Day

=== New Orleans Saints ===
Powell was listed as the 15th-ranked OLB and projected to be a fifth-round pick in the 2014 NFL draft. The New Orleans Saints drafted Powell in the fifth round with the 169th overall pick. He played in 14 games during the 2014 season. The Saints released him on September 1, 2015; after he cleared waivers, he was placed on the Saints' injured reserve list.

=== Tampa Bay Buccaneers ===
Powell was signed to the practice squad of the Tampa Bay Buccaneers on November 4, 2015.

=== Chicago Bears ===
On September 21, 2016, Powell was signed to the Bears' practice squad.

=== Seattle Seahawks ===
On December 13, 2016, Powell was signed by the Seahawks off the Bears' practice squad.

On August 10, 2017, Powell was waived/injured by the Seahawks and placed on injured reserve. He was released on August 16, 2017.

=== Orlando Apollos ===
In 2018, Powell signed with the Orlando Apollos of the Alliance of American Football for the 2019 season. He was placed on the waived/injured list on January 9, 2019. The league ceased operations in April 2019.

== Death ==
Powell died on January 15, 2024, at the age of 32.

== See also ==
- List of Florida Gators in the NFL draft
