= Solomon Patton =

American football player (born 1990)

No. 86
- Positions: Wide receiver, kick returner

Personal information
- Born: October 17, 1990 (age 36); Mobile, Alabama, U.S.
- Listed height: 5 ft 9 in (1.75 m)
- Listed weight: 177 lb (80 kg)

Career information
- High school: Murphy (Mobile)
- College: Florida
- NFL draft: 2014: undrafted

Career history
- Tampa Bay Buccaneers (2014); Arizona Cardinals (2014)*; Tampa Bay Buccaneers (2014); Denver Broncos (2015)*; Winnipeg Blue Bombers (2016)*
- * Offseason or practice squad member only

Awards and highlights
- Second-team All-SEC (2013)

Career NFL statistics
- Rushing yards: 19
- Return yards: 528
- Stats at Pro Football Reference

Solomon Patton Jr. (born October 17, 1990) is an American former professional football player who was a wide receiver for the Tampa Bay Buccaneers of the National Football League (NFL). He played college football for the Florida Gators. He was signed by the Buccaneers as an undrafted free agent in 2014. He was also a member of the NFL's Arizona Cardinals and Denver Broncos.

== Early life ==
Patton attended Murphy High School in Mobile, Alabama, where he played football and ran track. As a sophomore, he hauled in 66 receptions for 950 yards and nine touchdowns. As a junior in 2008, he was named to the ASWA All-State 6A first-team after recording 845 receiving yards and 12 touchdowns. In his final year, he had 30 rushes for 371 yards and three touchdowns and caught 71 passes for 891 yards and seven touchdowns. He also averaged 38.8 yards on five kickoff returns. Following his senior season, he was invited to play in the Alabama/Mississippi All-Star Game.

Patton was also a track & field star at Murphy. At the 2008 AHSAA 4A-6A Championship, he recorded a personal-best time of 10.67 seconds in the 100-meter dash on his way to a first-place finish. As a senior, he participated in the long jump and posted a leap of 6.58 meters (21'6") at the McT Jump-N-Throw. He also ran the 200-meter dash in 21.64 seconds at the Mobile Challenge Invitational, placing third.

Regarded as a four-star recruit by Rivals.com, Patton was rated a four-star prospect and the No. 36 wide receiver in the nation by Scout.com.

== College career ==
Patton attended the University of Florida, where he played for coach Urban Meyer and coach Will Muschamp's Gators football teams from 2010 to 2013. During his four-year college career he played in 43 games for the Gators, started eight of them, recording 52 receptions for 635 yards and six touchdowns. He also was a return specialist and set the team record for highest kick-return average in a season with 29.2.

== Professional career ==
=== Tampa Bay Buccaneers ===
Patton signed with the Tampa Bay Buccaneers as an undrafted free agent after the 2014 NFL draft. With the Buccaneers Patton had 18 kick returns for 416 yards and a long of 28 and 10 punt returns for 112 yards and a long of 33. Patton was waived by the Tampa Bay Buccaneers on October 21, 2014.

=== Arizona Cardinals ===
Patton was signed by the Arizona Cardinals on October 25, 2014.

=== Denver Broncos ===
Patton was claimed off waivers by the Denver Broncos on May 12, 2015. He was released by the Broncos on August 28, 2015.

=== Winnipeg Blue Bombers ===
On March 14, 2016, Solomon Patton agreed to a contract with the Winnipeg Blue Bombers of the Canadian Football League.

== See also ==
- List of Florida Gators in the NFL draft
