= Dominique Easley =

American football player (born 1992)

No. 74, 99, 91
- Position: Defensive tackle

Personal information
- Born: April 28, 1992 (age 34); Staten Island, New York, U.S.
- Listed height: 6 ft 2 in (1.88 m)
- Listed weight: 263 lb (119 kg)

Career information
- High school: Curtis (Staten Island)
- College: Florida (2010–2013)
- NFL draft: 2014: 1st round, 29th overall pick

Career history
- New England Patriots (2014–2015); Los Angeles Rams (2016–2018)

Awards and highlights
- Super Bowl champion (XLIX)

Career NFL statistics
- Total tackles: 64
- Sacks: 6.5
- Forced fumbles: 2
- Pass deflections: 2
- Interceptions: 1
- Stats at Pro Football Reference

Dominique Easley (born April 28, 1992) is an American former professional football player who was a defensive tackle in the National Football League (NFL). He played college football for the Florida Gators. He was selected by the New England Patriots in the first round of the 2014 NFL draft.

== Early life ==
Easley attended Curtis High School in Staten Island, New York, where he played football and competed in track. In football, he was selected to play in the 2010 Under Armour All-America Game in St. Petersburg, Florida, where he announced his commitment to attend the University of Florida.

Easley also competed in track & field as a junior. At the 2009 PSAL Borough Championships, he won the shot put event, with a throw of 40 ft, and placed 10th in the 55-meter dash, with a time of 7.44 seconds. He took 8th in the shot put at the 2009 PSAL City Champs, with a PR of 43 ft 7 in.

Considered a five-star recruit by ESPN.com, Easley was listed as the No. 1 defensive tackle in the nation in 2010.

== College career ==
Easley accepted an athletic scholarship to attend the University of Florida, where he played for coach Urban Meyer and coach Will Muschamp's Florida Gators football teams from 2010 to 2013.

As a true freshman in 2010, Easley played sparingly, playing in six games and totaling four tackles. In 2011, he started all 12 regular-season games, before suffering a torn ACL against Florida State. He recorded a total of 37 tackles on the season, finishing tied for fifth on the team with 7.5 tackles for a loss. In 2012, he played in and started eleven games, missing two games due to injury. He collected 26 tackles on the season, including 8.5 tackles for a loss and a team leading four quarterback sacks, while adding a fumble recovery. In 2013, Easley's senior season was cut short after tearing his ACL in practice leading up to the Kentucky game. He totaled five tackles, including two for a loss.

On September 30, 2013, just a few days after it was reported he would miss the rest of the college football season, Easley announced he would forgo his remaining eligibility and enter the NFL draft.

== Professional career ==
Pre-draft measurables
Height	Weight	Arm length	Hand span	40-yard dash	Bench press
6 ft 1 3/4 in (1.87 m)	288 lb (131 kg)	32 7/8 in (0.84 m)	9 3/4 in (0.25 m)	4.93 s	26 reps
All values from NFL Combine

=== New England Patriots ===
Easley was selected by the New England Patriots in the first round (29th overall) of the 2014 NFL draft. The team signed him to a four-year contract on June 23, 2014. According to Ian Rapoport, the contract was for $7.3 million.

On September 7, 2014, Easley played in his first NFL regular season game, a 33–20 road loss to the Miami Dolphins. He would record his first career interception (off former Patriot Matt Cassel) the following week during a 30–7 win over the Minnesota Vikings. On December 17, the Patriots placed Easley on injured reserve, with a knee injury. In 11 games of his rookie season, Easley finished with 9 tackles, 1 sack, 1 pass defended, and 1 interception.

Without Easley, the Patriots won Super Bowl XLIX after they defeated the defending champion Seattle Seahawks 28–24.

After the departure of longtime starter Vince Wilfork, Easley began the 2015 season as one of the Patriots' starting defensive tackles. On December 15, 2015, the Patriots placed Easley on injured reserve with a quadriceps injury, ending his season. He ended the season with 15 tackles and two sacks.

In an unexpected move, the Patriots released Easley on April 13, 2016.

=== Los Angeles Rams ===
On May 17, 2016, Easley signed a one-year contract with the Los Angeles Rams after working out with the team. He played in all 16 games for the Rams in 2016, recording 35 tackles, 3.5 sacks, one pass deflected and two forced fumbles.

On March 7, 2017, the Rams placed an original round (first-round) tender on Easley. On May 4, Easley signed his tender with the Rams. During training camp, Easley suffered a torn ACL, his third, experiencing tears in both knees in college. He was ruled out for the 2017 season.

On March 19, 2018, Easley signed a one-year contract to remain with the Rams. On October 3, Easley was placed on injured reserve after undergoing another knee surgery. Without Easley, the Rams reached Super Bowl LIII where they lost 13–3 to Easley's former team the New England Patriots.

== Personal life ==
Easley's mother is of Haitian descent.

Dominique has one older brother David Easley and one younger sister Destinee Easley who is a student at the New York Film Academy in Burbank, California.

Easley is a Muslim. He declared on his Twitter account that he converted to Islam on March 13, 2015.

On February 16, 2022, Easley was a part of the Jeannis Family on Family Feud.

== See also ==
- List of Florida Gators in the NFL draft
- List of Los Angeles Rams players
- List of New England Patriots players
