= 1987 Washington Redskins season =

NFL team season (won Super Bowl)

- Owner: Jack Kent Cooke
- General manager: Bobby Beathard
- President: John Kent Cooke
- Head coach: Joe Gibbs
- Offensive coordinator: Joe Bugel
- Defensive coordinator: Richie Petitbon
- Home stadium: RFK Stadium

Results
- Record: 11–4
- Division place: 1st NFC East
- Playoffs: Won Divisional Playoffs (at Bears) 21–17; Won NFC Championship (vs. Vikings) 17–10; Won Super Bowl XXII (vs. Broncos) 42–10
- All-Pros: 5: WR Gary Clark (1st team); OT Joe Jacoby (1st team); DE Charles Mann (2nd team); CB Darrell Green (1st team); CB Barry Wilburn (1st team)
- Pro Bowlers: 3: WR Gary Clark; DE Charles Mann; CB Darrell Green

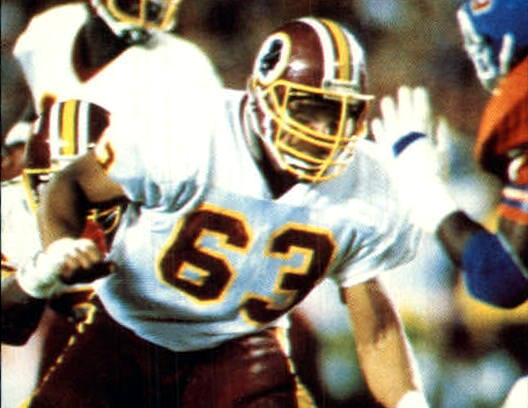
Redskins guard Raleigh McKenzie covering an opponent on the Broncos during Super Bowl XXII.

The 1987 Washington Redskins season was the franchise's strike season. The 56th season in the National Football League (NFL), their 52nd in Washington, D.C., and their seventh under head coach Joe Gibbs. The season was a shortened season due to the 1987 NFL strike.

The team had finished second in the NFC East the previous season with a 12–4 record. Games to be played during the third week of the season were canceled, and replacement players were used to play games from weeks 4 through 6; every union member on the team joined the strike, making them the only team to have no one break. The replacement team was dubbed by fans as the Washington Scabskins.

The Redskins won the NFC East with an 11–4 record. The Redskins defeated the Denver Broncos 42–10 to win Super Bowl XXII. It was the Redskins' second Super Bowl win in six seasons, and coincidentally, their second Super Bowl win in a strike season.

Redskins quarterback Doug Williams became the first black quarterback to start in a Super Bowl and was the only one to have emerged victorious until Russell Wilson won Super Bowl XLVIII with the Seattle Seahawks.

By virtue of the Redskins' 17–10 victory over Minnesota in the NFC title game, head coach Joe Gibbs earned his 10th playoff victory. He surpassed the legendary Vince Lombardi, who had retired after his 9th playoff victory and (coincidentally) later coached the Redskins for one season. Also ironic was the rumor that, following a disastrous 5-9-1 season, Green Bay would hire Gibbs to replace the dismissed Forrest Gregg. However, after the game, Gibbs would deny that he was interested.

== Offseason ==
=== NFL draft ===
1987 Washington Redskins draft
| Round | Pick | Player | Position | College | Notes |
| 2 | 30 | Brian Davis | CB | Nebraska | from Indianapolis |
| 2 | 48 | Wally Kleine | OT | Notre Dame | from LA Raiders |
| 5 | 117 | Timmy Smith | RB | Texas Tech | |
| 6 | 144 | Steve Gage | S | Tulsa | |
| 6 | 164 | Ed Simmons | OT | Eastern Washington | |
| 7 | 192 | Johnny Thomas | CB | Baylor | |
| 8 | 219 | Clarence Vaughn | S | Northern Illinois | |
| 9 | 248 | Alfred Jenkins | RB | Arizona | |
| 10 | 274 | Ted Wilson | WR | UCF | |
| 11 | 304 | Laron Brown | WR | Texas | |
| 12 | 331 | Ray Hitchcock | C | Minnesota | |
Made roster

=== Undrafted free agents ===
1987 undrafted free agents of note
| Player | Position | College |
|---|---|---|
| Darrick Brilz | Offensive tackle | Oregon State |
| Mark Carlson | Offensive tackle | Southern Connecticut State |
| Eric Coyle | Center | Colorado |
| Keith Radecic | Center | Penn State |
| Ed Rubbert | Quarterback | Louisville |
| Ted Romney | Offensive tackle | Missouri |
| Norries Wilson | Offensive tackle | Minnesota |

== Personnel ==
=== Staff / Coaches ===
1987 Washington Redskins staff
| Front office: Owner – Jack Kent Cooke; Executive Vice President - John Kent Cooke; Senior Vice President - Gerard T. Gabrys; Director of Player Personnel - Dick Daniels; Director of Pro Scouting - Kirk Mee; General manager – Bobby Beathard; Assistant General Manager - Bobby Mitchell; Assistant General Manager - Charley Casserly; Administrative assistant – Bill Hickman; Head coaches: Head coach – Joe Gibbs; Offensive coaches: Offensive coordinator – Dan Henning; Quarterbacks – Jerry Rhome; Running backs – Don Breaux; Wide receivers – Charley Taylor; Assistant wide receivers – Dan Henning; Tight ends – Rennie Simmons; Offensive line – Joe Bugel | Defensive coaches: Co-defensive coordinator – Larry Peccatiello; Co-defensive coordinator – Richie Petitbon; Defensive line – LaVern Torgeson; Special teams coaches: Special teams coordinator – Chuck Banker; Strength and conditioning: Strength coach – Joe Diange; Conditioning coach – Dan Riley |

=== NFL replacement players ===
After the league decided to use replacement players during the NFLPA strike, the following team was assembled:

1987 Washington Redskins replacement roster
| Quarterbacks: 15 Tony Robinson; 16 Ed Rubbert; -- Kevin Sisk; 11 Jack Stanley; Running backs: -- Von Allen; 31 Allen Harvin; -- Walter Holman; -- Ricky Jemison; 21 Tim Jessie; 20 Lionel Vital; Wide receivers: 30 Anthony Allen; 84 Keiron Bigby; 83 Richard Johnson; -- Mike Miller; -- Mike Rice; 88 Derrick Shepard; -- Carl Williams; 80 Ted Wilson; Tight ends: 89 Glenn Dennison; 87 K. D. Dunn; 83 Craig McEwen; -- Kevin Starks; 85 Dave Truitt; 48 Marvin Williams; -- Glenn Bodnar | Offensive linemen: 75 Darrick Brilz G; 79 Mark Carlson T; 54 John Cowne C; 56 Eric Coyle C; 76 Frank Frazier G; 62 Phil Pettey G; 61 Willard Scissum T; -- Don Tucker; 60 Mike Wooten; Defensive linemen: 95 Dan Benish; 96 Alec Gibson; 99 Ted Karras Jr.; 94 Anthony Sagnella DT; -- Robert Scott; 67 Steve Thompson DT | Linebackers: -- Jeff Braswell; 92 Derek Bunch; 57 Anthony Copeland; 90 Bobby Curtis; -- Jon Kimmel; 50 Carlton Rose; 91 Tony Settles; 59 Eric Wilson; 58 Dave Windham; Defensive backs: 22 Danny Burmeister S; 36 Joe Cofer SS; 25 Dave Etherly CB; 37 Charles Jackson SS; -- Eric Jeffries; 34 Garry Kimble CB; 39 Skip Lane FS; 46 Mike Mitchell CB; -- Dennis Woodberry; Special teams: 8 Brendan Toibin K; 2 Jack Weil P |

=== Roster ===
1987 Washington Redskins roster
| Quarterbacks (QB): 11 Mark Rypien; 10 Jay Schroeder; 17 Doug Williams; Running backs (RB): 29 Reggie Branch; 24 Kelvin Bryant; 35 Keith Griffin; 38 George Rogers; 36 Timmy Smith; Wide receivers (WR): 89 Anthony Allen; 84 Gary Clark; 83 Ricky Sanders; 89 Clarence Verdin; 80 Eric Yarber; Tight ends (TE): 88 Joe Caravello; 86 Clint Didier; 82 Anthony Jones; 87 Terry Orr; 85 Don Warren | Offensive linemen (OL): 53 Jeff Bostic C; 68 Russ Grimm C; 66 Joe Jacoby LT; 61 Rick Kehr G; 73 Mark May RT; 63 Raleigh McKenzie G; 69 R.C. Thielemann G; Defensive linemen (DL): 65 Dave Butz DT; 77 Darryl Grant DT; 78 Dean Hamel DT; 64 Steve Hamilton DE; 74 Markus Koch DE; 72 Dexter Manley DE; 71 Charles Mann DE | Linebackers (LB): 50 Ravin Caldwell OLB; 51 Monte Coleman OLB; 54 Kurt Gouveia MLB; 55 Mel Kaufman OLB; 57 Rich Milot MLB; 52 Neal Olkewicz MLB; Defensive backs (DB): 23 Todd Bowles FS; 34 Brian Davis CB; 32 Vernon Dean CB; 48 Steve Gage FS; 28 Darrell Green CB; 41 Tim Morrison CB; 40 Alvin Walton SS; 45 Barry Wilburn CB; 46 Dennis Woodberry CB; Special teams (ST): 12 Steve Cox P; 58 David Jones LS; 6 Ali Haji-Sheikh K | Reserve: 4 Jess Atkinson K (IR); 95 Dan Benish DT (IR); 75 Darrick Brilz G (IR); 79 Mark Carlson T (IR); -- Anthony Copeland LB (IR); 56 Eric Coyle C (IR); 59 Ray Hitchcock C (IR); -- Wally Kleine T (IR); 67 Kit Lathrop DE (IR); -- Craig McEwen TE (IR); 60 Dan McQuaid T (IR); 81 Art Monk WR (IR); 97 Albert Reese TE (IR); -- Kenneth Robinson LB (IR); 76 Ed Simmons T (IR); -- Chris Spachman DT (IR); 47 Johnny Thomas CB (IR); 31 Clarence Vaughn S (IR); Rookies in italics |

== Preseason ==
| Week | Date | Opponent | Result | Record | Venue | Recap |
|---|---|---|---|---|---|---|
| 1 | August 14 | Pittsburgh Steelers | W 23–17 | 1–0 | Robert F. Kennedy Memorial Stadium | Recap |
| 2 | August 22 | vs Green Bay Packers | W 33–0 | 2–0 | Camp Randall Stadium | Recap |
| 3 | August 29 | at Tampa Bay Buccaneers | L 10–17 | 2–1 | Tampa Stadium | Recap |
| 4 | September 5 | at Los Angeles Rams | W 26–14 | 3–1 | Anaheim Stadium | Recap |

== Regular season ==
In 1987, Redskins starting QB Jay Schroeder got injured early in the opening game against the Eagles and was replaced by Williams, who led the team to victory. In his NFL debut, replacement player Ed Rubbert passed for 334 yards. Rubbert also threw three touchdown passes to Anthony Allen. Allen would have 255 receiving yards.

=== Schedule ===
| Week | Date | Opponent | Result | Record | Venue | Recap |
|---|---|---|---|---|---|---|
| 1 | September 13 | Philadelphia Eagles | W 34–24 | 1–0 | Robert F. Kennedy Memorial Stadium | Recap |
| 2 | September 20 | at Atlanta Falcons | L 20–21 | 1–1 | Atlanta–Fulton County Stadium | Recap |
| - | September 27 | New England Patriots | Cancelled due to the 1987 NFL strike † | | | |
| 3 | October 4 | St. Louis Cardinals | W 28–21 | 2–1 | Robert F. Kennedy Memorial Stadium | Recap |
| 4 | October 11 | at New York Giants | W 38–12 | 3–1 | Giants Stadium | Recap |
| 5 | October 19 | at Dallas Cowboys | W 13–7 | 4–1 | Texas Stadium | Recap |
| 6 | October 25 | New York Jets | W 17–16 | 5–1 | Robert F. Kennedy Memorial Stadium | Recap |
| 7 | November 1 | at Buffalo Bills | W 27–7 | 6–1 | Rich Stadium | Recap |
| 8 | November 8 | at Philadelphia Eagles | L 27–31 | 6–2 | Veterans Stadium | Recap |
| 9 | November 15 | Detroit Lions | W 20–13 | 7–2 | Robert F. Kennedy Memorial Stadium | Recap |
| 10 | November 23 | Los Angeles Rams | L 26–30 | 7–3 | Robert F. Kennedy Memorial Stadium | Recap |
| 11 | November 29 | New York Giants | W 23–19 | 8–3 | Robert F. Kennedy Memorial Stadium | Recap |
| 12 | December 6 | at St. Louis Cardinals | W 34–17 | 9–3 | Busch Memorial Stadium | Recap |
| 13 | December 13 | Dallas Cowboys | W 24–20 | 10–3 | Robert F. Kennedy Memorial Stadium | Recap |
| 14 | December 20 | at Miami Dolphins | L 21–23 | 10–4 | Joe Robbie Stadium | Recap |
| 15 | December 26 | at Minnesota Vikings | W 27–24 (OT) | 11–4 | Hubert H. Humphrey Metrodome | Recap |

== Regular season summaries ==
=== Week 1: vs. Philadelphia Eagles ===
Week 1: Philadelphia Eagles at Washington Redskins – Game summary

| Quarter | 1 | 2 | 3 | 4 | Total |
|---|---|---|---|---|---|
| Eagles | 0 | 10 | 14 | 0 | 24 |
| Redskins | 10 | 7 | 7 | 10 | 34 |

at RFK Stadium, Washington, D.C.

- Date: September 13
- Game time: 1:00 p.m. EDT
- Game weather: 74 °F (23 °C)
- Game attendance: 52,128
- Referee: Dick Jorgensen
- TV announcers (CBS): Verne Lundquist and John Madden
- Box score

Game information

First quarter

- WAS – Jess Atkinson 27-yard field goal, 11:30. Redskins 3–0.
- WAS – Art Monk 6-yard pass from Doug Williams (Jess Atkinson kick), 4:18. Redskins 10–0.

Second quarter

- PHI – Mike Quick 30-yard pass from Randall Cunningham (Paul McFadden kick), 10:58. Redskins 10–7.
- PHI – Paul McFadden 43-yard field goal, 5:32. Tied 10–10.
- WAS – George Rogers 1-yard run (Steve Cox kick), 0:38. Redskins 17–10.

Third quarter

- WAS – Reggie Branch 1-yard run (Steve Cox kick), 11:12. Redskins 24–10.
- PHI – Randall Cunningham 2-yard run (Paul McFadden kick), 4:19. Redskins 24–17.
- PHI – Reggie White 70-yard fumble return (Paul McFadden kick), 0:08. Tied 24–24.

Fourth quarter

- WAS – Art Monk 39-yard pass from Doug Williams (Steve Cox kick), 14:53. Redskins 31–24.
- WAS – Steve Cox 40-yard field goal, 5:20. Redskins 34–24.

Top passers

- PHI – Randall Cunningham – 21/36, 269 yards, TD, 2 INT
- WAS – Doug Williams – 17/27, 272 yards, 2 TD

Top rushers

- PHI – Michael Haddix – 14 rushes, 60 yards
- WAS – Kelvin Bryant – 7 rushes, 32 yards

Top receivers

- PHI – John Spagnola – 6 receptions, 61 yards
- WAS – Gary Clark – 8 receptions, 102 yards

=== Week 2 (Sunday, September 20, 1987): at Atlanta Falcons ===
Week 2: Washington Redskins at Atlanta Falcons – Game summary

| Quarter | 1 | 2 | 3 | 4 | Total |
|---|---|---|---|---|---|
| Redskins (1–1) | 7 | 0 | 6 | 7 | 20 |
| Falcons (1–1) | 7 | 0 | 7 | 7 | 21 |

at Atlanta–Fulton County Stadium • Atlanta, Georgia

- Date: September 20, 1987
- Game time: 1:00 p.m. EDT
- Game weather: 70 °F (21 °C), relative humidity 67%, wind 10 miles per hour (16 km/h; 8.7 kn)
- Game attendance: 50,982
- Referee: Ben Dreith
- TV announcers (CBS): Verne Lundquist (play-by-play) and Dick Vermeil (color commentator)

| Team | Category | Player | Statistics |
|---|---|---|---|
| WSH | Passing | Doug Williams | 18/30, 198 YDS, 3 TDs, 2 INTs |
| WSH | Rushing | Keith Griffin | 14 CAR, 73 YDS |
| WSH | Receiving | Kelvin Bryant | 6 REC, 76 YDS, TD |
| ATL | Passing | Scott Campbell | 17/34, 271 YDS, 2 TDs, INT |
| ATL | Rushing | Gerald Riggs | 23 CAR, 130 YDS, TD |
| ATL | Receiving | Ken Whisenhunt | 6 REC, 68 YDS |

Scoring summary

| Quarter | Time | Drive | | | Team | Scoring information | Score | |
| Quarter | Time | Plays | Yards | TOP | Team | Scoring information | WSH | ATL |
|---|---|---|---|---|---|---|---|---|
| 1 | 7:11 | | | | Redskins | Bryant 17-yard touchdown reception from Williams, Haji-Sheikh kick good | 7 | 0 |
| 1 | 1:29 | | | | Falcons | Dixon 22-yard touchdown reception from Campbell, Luckhurst kick good | 7 | 7 |
| 3 | 8:56 | | | | Redskins | Clark 18-yard touchdown reception from Williams, Haji-Sheikh kick no good | 13 | 7 |
| 3 | 5:13 | | | | Falcons | Bailey 23-yard touchdown reception from Campbell, Luckhurst kick good | 13 | 14 |
| 4 | 11:48 | | | | Redskins | Monk 6-yard touchdown reception from Williams, Haji-Sheikh kick good | 20 | 14 |
| 4 | 6:47 | | | | Falcons | Riggs 4-yard touchdown run, Luckhurst kick good | 20 | 21 |
| "TOP" = time of possession. For other American football terms, see Glossary of American football. | | | | | | | 20 | 21 |

- Point spread: Redskins –6½
- Over/under: 41.5 (under)
- Time of game:

| Redskins | Game statistics | Falcons |
|---|---|---|
| 21 | First downs | 18 |
| 32–145 | Rushes–yards | 29–125 |
| 198 | Passing yards | 271 |
| 18–30–2 | Passes | 17–34–1 |
| 1–8 | Sacked–yards | 1–2 |
| 190 | Net passing yards | 269 |
| 325 | Total yards | 394 |
| 111 | Return yards | 77 |
| 5–51.6 | Punts | 6–46.5 |
| 2–1 | Fumbles–lost | 2–0 |
| 5–54 | Penalties–yards | 8–50 |
| 33:02 | Time of possession | 26:58 |

Individual stats

Redskins Passing
| | C/ATT^{1} | Yds | TD | INT | Sk | Yds | LG^{3} | Rate |
|---|---|---|---|---|---|---|---|---|
| Williams | 18/30 | 198 | 3 | 2 | 1 | 9 | 35 | 85.1 |

Redskins Rushing
| | Car^{2} | Yds | TD | LG^{3} |
|---|---|---|---|---|
| Griffin | 14 | 73 | 0 | 13 |
| Bryant | 15 | 70 | 0 | 12 |
| Branch | 1 | 3 | 0 | 3 |
| Williams | 1 | 3 | 0 | 3 |
| Monk | 1 | −4 | 0 | −4 |

Redskins Receiving
| | Rec^{4} | Yds | TD | LG^{3} |
|---|---|---|---|---|
| Bryant | 6 | 76 | 1 | 35 |
| Sanders | 4 | 45 | 0 | 14 |
| Clark | 3 | 52 | 1 | 29 |
| Monk | 2 | 12 | 1 | 6 |
| Dennison | 2 | 8 | 0 | 5 |
| Yarber | 1 | 5 | 0 | 5 |

Redskins Kicking
| | FGM–FGA | XPM–XPA |
|---|---|---|
| Haji-Sheikh | 0–1 | 2–3 |

- Missed Field Goals: Haji-Sheikh 33

Redskins Punting
| | Pnt | Yds | Y/P | Lng | Blck |
|---|---|---|---|---|---|
| Cox | 5 | 258 | 51.6 | | |

Redskins Kick Returns
| | Ret | Yds | Y/Rt | TD | Lng |
|---|---|---|---|---|---|
| Griffin | 3 | 28 | 9.3 | 0 | 0 |

Redskins Punt Returns
| | Ret | Yds | Y/Rt | TD | Lng |
|---|---|---|---|---|---|
| Yarber | 4 | 61 | 15.3 | 0 | 0 |

Redskins Sacks
| | Sacks |
|---|---|
| Hamilton | 1.0 |

Redskins Interceptions
| | Int | Yds | TD | LG | PD |
|---|---|---|---|---|---|
| Wilburn | 1 | 22 | 0 | 22 | 0 |

=== Week 3: vs. New England Patriots (Canceled) ===
The Redskins were scheduled to host the New England Patriots, but a players' strike was called following the conclusion of week 2. The week 3 slate of games were cancelled as a result. Games would resume the following week with team rosters mostly made up of replacement players.

=== Week 4: vs. St. Louis Cardinals ===
Week 4: St. Louis Cardinals at Washington Redskins – Game summary

| Quarter | 1 | 2 | 3 | 4 | Total |
|---|---|---|---|---|---|
| Cardinals | 0 | 7 | 7 | 7 | 21 |
| Redskins | 7 | 7 | 14 | 0 | 28 |

at RFK Stadium, Washington, D.C.

- Date: October 4
- Game time: 1:00 p.m. EDT
- Game weather: 50 °F (10 °C)
- Game attendance: 27,728
- Referee: Jerry Seeman
- TV announcers (CBS): Tim Ryan and Joe Theismann
- Box score

Game information

First quarter

- WAS – Anthony Allen 34-yard pass from Ed Rubbert (Brendan Toibin kick), 1:20. Redskins 7–0.

Second quarter

- STL – Earl Ferrell 1-yard run (Jason Staurovsky kick), 9:28. Tied 7–7.
- WAS – Anthony Allen 88-yard pass from Ed Rubbert (Brendan Toibin kick), 9:05. Redskins 14–7.

Third quarter

- STL – Earl Ferrell 1-yard run (Jason Staurovsky kick), 8:01. Tied 14–14.
- WAS – Lionel Vital 8-yard run (Brendan Toibin kick), 5:24. Redskins 21–14.
- WAS – Anthony Allen 48-yard pass from Ed Rubbert (Brendan Toibin kick), 2:02. Redskins 28–14.

Fourth quarter

- STL – Pete Noga 60-yard interception return (Jason Staurovsky kick), 12:17. Redskins 28–21.

Top passers

- STL – Shawn Halloran – 16/35, 258 yards
- WAS – Ed Rubbert – 14/24, 334 yards, 3 TD, INT

Top rushers

- STL – Earl Ferrell – 27 rushes, 87 yards, 2 TD
- WAS – Lionel Vital – 27 rushes, 82 yards, TD

Top receivers

- STL – J. T. Smith – 6 receptions, 116 yards
- WAS – Anthony Allen – 7 receptions, 255 yards, 3 TD

In the first game since the start of the strike, Washington hosted divisional rival St. Louis. The Cardinals' roster had a few players that crossed the picket line, while the Redskins' roster was completely made up of replacement players. Wide receiver Anthony Allen finished the game with 255 receiving yards, breaking the franchise record for receiving yards in a single game.

=== Week 5: at New York Giants ===
Week 5: Washington Redskins at New York Giants – Game summary

| Quarter | 1 | 2 | 3 | 4 | Total |
|---|---|---|---|---|---|
| Redskins | 3 | 21 | 7 | 7 | 38 |
| Giants | 3 | 0 | 9 | 0 | 12 |

at Giants Stadium, East Rutherford, New Jersey

- Date: October 11
- Game time: 4:00 p.m. EDT
- Game weather: 52 °F (11 °C)
- Game attendance: 9,123
- Referee: Tom Dooley
- TV announcers (CBS): Pat Summerall and John Madden
- Box score

Game information

First quarter

- NYG – George Benyola 45-yard field goal, 11:48. Giants 3–0.
- WAS – Obed Ariri 22-yard field goal, 6:57. Tied 3–3.

Second quarter

- WAS – Wayne Wilson 1-yard run (Obed Ariri kick), 9:50. Redskins 10–3.
- WAS – Lionel Vital 22-yard run (Obed Ariri kick), 5:05. Redskins 17–3.
- WAS – Wayne Wilson 3-yard run (Obed Ariri kick), 1:15. Redskins 24–3.

Third quarter

- NYG – Edwin Lovelady 23-yard pass from Mike Busch (kick failed), 10:54. Redskins 24–9.
- WAS – Wayne Wilson 64-yard pass from Ed Rubbert (Obed Ariri kick), 9:36. Redskins 31–9.
- NYG – George Beynola 20-yard field goal, 6:02. Redskins 31–12.

Fourth quarter

- WAS – Tim Jessie 14-yard run (Obed Ariri kick), 1:55. Redskins 38–12.

Top passers

- WAS – Ed Rubbert – 11/23, 176 yards, TD
- NYG – Mike Busch – 14/41, 183 yards, TD, INT

Top rushers

- WAS – Lionel Vital – 27 rushes, 128 yards, TD
- NYG – Van Williams – 12 rushes, 36 yards

Top receivers

- WAS – Anthony Allen – 4 receptions, 51 yards
- NYG – Lewis Bennett – 4 receptions, 66 yards

=== Week 6: at Dallas Cowboys ===
Week 6: Washington Redskins at Dallas Cowboys – Game summary

| Quarter | 1 | 2 | 3 | 4 | Total |
|---|---|---|---|---|---|
| Redskins | 3 | 0 | 7 | 3 | 13 |
| Cowboys | 0 | 0 | 7 | 0 | 7 |

at Texas Stadium, Irving, Texas

- Date: October 19
- Game time: 9:00 p.m. EDT/8:00 p.m. CDT
- Game weather: 67 °F (19 °C)
- Game attendance: 60,415
- Referee: Pat Haggerty
- TV announcers (ABC): Frank Gifford and Dan Dierdorf
- Box score

Game information

First quarter

- WAS – Obed Ariri 19-yard field goal, 8:49. Redskins 3–0.

Second quarter

- No scoring plays

Third quarter

- WAS – Ted Wilson 16-yard run (Obed Ariri kick), 10:35. Redskins 10–0.
- DAL – Kelvin Edwards 23-yard pass from Danny White (Kerry Brady kick), 8:10. Redskins 10–7.

Fourth quarter

- WAS – Obed Ariri 39-yard field goal, 6:13. Redskins 13–7.

Top passers

- WAS – Tony Robinson – 11/15, 152 yards, 2 INT
- DAL – Danny White – 21/36, 262 yards, TD, INT

Top rushers

- WAS – Lionel Vital – 26 rushes, 136 yards
- DAL – Tony Dorsett – 19 rushes, 81 yards

Top receivers

- WAS – Craig McEwen – 7 receptions, 108 yards
- DAL – Kelvin Edwards – 6 receptions, 104 yards, TD

Days before the game, the players' strike was ended. However, the replacement players were still in use week six due to an owner-induced deadline for the regular players to return, with the union missing the deadline. Washington traveled to Dallas to take on the Cowboys on ABC's Monday Night Football in what would be the last game to feature the replacement players. The Redskins' roster consisted entirely of replacement players while the Cowboys had several players that crossed the picket line, including star defensive tackle Randy White and running back Tony Dorsett. With the strike over, Washington was only one of two franchises to not have any players cross the picket line, with the other being the Philadelphia Eagles.

The Redskins would sign some of the replacement players to the regular roster. Players of note include wide receiver Anthony Allen and tight end Craig McEwen.

=== Week 7: vs. New York Jets ===
Week 7: New York Jets at Washington Redskins – Game summary

| Quarter | 1 | 2 | 3 | 4 | Total |
|---|---|---|---|---|---|
| Jets | 0 | 3 | 10 | 3 | 16 |
| Redskins | 0 | 7 | 0 | 10 | 17 |

at RFK Stadium, Washington, D.C.

- Date: October 25
- Game time: 1:00 p.m. EST
- Game weather: 56 °F (13 °C)
- Game attendance: 53,497
- Referee: Dick Hantak
- TV announcers (NBC): Marv Albert and Joe Namath
- Box score

Game information

First quarter

- No scoring plays

Second quarter

- WAS – Gary Clark 20-yard pass from Jay Schroeder (Ali Haji-Sheikh kick), 11:21. Redskins 7–0.
- NYJ – Pat Leahy 33-yard field goal, 2:25. Redskins 7–3.

Third quarter

- NYJ – Pat Leahy 23-yard field goal, 7:39. Redskins 7–6.
- NYJ – Mickey Shuler 15-yard pass from Ken O'Brien (Pat Leahy kick), 0:06. Jets 13–7.

Fourth quarter

- NYJ – Pat Leahy 21-yard field goal, 10:38. Jets 16–7.
- WAS – Kelvin Bryant 2-yard pass from Jay Schroeder (Ali Haji-Sheikh kick), 5:15. Jets 16–14.
- WAS – Ali Haji-Sheikh 28-yard field goal, 0:54. Redskins 17–16.

Top passers

- NYJ – Ken O'Brien – 18/27, 174 yards, TD, INT
- WAS – Jay Schroeder – 15/38, 275 yards, 2 TD, INT

Top rushers

- NYJ – Roger Vick – 4 rushes, 29 yards
- WAS – Keith Griffin – 20 rushes, 79 yards

Top receivers

- NYJ – Al Toon – 9 receptions, 97 yards
- WAS – Kelvin Bryant – 4 receptions, 67 yards, TD

In the first game with its regular players since week 2, Washington hosted the New York Jets. Washington's offense struggled throughout most of the game, with fans booing the team and demanding that the replacement players be put into the game. The Redskins would come back in the fourth quarter to defeat the Jets 17–16, with kicker Ali Haji-Sheikh kicking the game-winning field goal with just under a minute left to play.

=== Week 8 (Sunday, November 1, 1987): at Buffalo Bills ===
Week 8: Washington Redskins at Buffalo Bills – Game summary

| Quarter | 1 | 2 | 3 | 4 | Total |
|---|---|---|---|---|---|
| Redskins (6–1) | 3 | 14 | 10 | 0 | 27 |
| Bills (3–4) | 0 | 0 | 0 | 7 | 7 |

at Rich Stadium • Orchard Park, New York

- Date: November 1, 1987
- Game time: 1:00 p.m. EST
- Game weather: 44 °F (7 °C), relative humidity 74%, wind 7 miles per hour (11 km/h; 6.1 kn)
- Game attendance: 71,640
- Referee: Jerry Markbreit
- TV announcers (CBS): Dick Stockton (play-by-play) and Terry Bradshaw (color commentator)

| Team | Category | Player | Statistics |
|---|---|---|---|
| WSH | Passing | Jay Schroeder | 11/18, 132 YDS, 2 TDs |
| WSH | Rushing | George Rogers | 30 CAR, 125 YDS |
| WSH | Receiving | Art Monk | 5 REC, 38 YDS |
| BUF | Passing | Jim Kelly | 25/43, 292 YDS, 1 TD, 3 INTs |
| BUF | Rushing | Robb Riddick | 6 CAR, 19 YDS |
| BUF | Receiving | Andre Reed | 8 REC, 108 YDS, 1 TD |

Scoring summary

| Quarter | Time | Drive | | | Team | Scoring information | Score | |
| Quarter | Time | Plays | Yards | TOP | Team | Scoring information | WSH | BUF |
|---|---|---|---|---|---|---|---|---|
| 1 | 10:45 | | | | Redskins | 30-yard field goal by Haji-Sheikh | 3 | 0 |
| 2 | 14:53 | | | | Redskins | Bryant 12-yard touchdown reception from Schroeder, Haji-Sheikh kick good | 10 | 0 |
| 2 | 7:06 | | | | Redskins | Schroeder 13-yard touchdown run, Haji-Sheikh kick good | 17 | 0 |
| 3 | 10:02 | | | | Redskins | Bryant 7-yard touchdown reception from Schroeder, Haji-Sheikh kick good | 24 | 0 |
| 3 | 2:29 | | | | Redskins | 33-yard field goal by Haji-Sheikh | 27 | 0 |
| 4 | 14:57 | | | | Bills | Reed 17-yard touchdown reception from Kelly, Norwood kick good | 27 | 7 |
| "TOP" = time of possession. For other American football terms, see Glossary of American football. | | | | | | | 27 | 7 |

- Point spread: Redskins –3½
- Over/under: 45.0 (under)
- Time of game:

| Redskins | Game statistics | Bills |
|---|---|---|
| 24 | First downs | 14 |
| 53–299 | Rushes–yards | 10–21 |
| 132 | Passing yards | 292 |
| 11–18–0 | Passes | 25–43–3 |
| 2–25 | Sacked–yards | 3–33 |
| 107 | Net passing yards | 259 |
| 406 | Total yards | 280 |
| 92 | Return yards | 74 |
| 5–44.4 | Punts | 5–41.6 |
| 2–1 | Fumbles–lost | 2–1 |
| 6–45 | Penalties–yards | 7–55 |
| 40:58 | Time of possession | 19:02 |

Individual stats

Redskins Passing
| | C/ATT^{1} | Yds | TD | INT | Sk | Yds | LG^{3} | Rate |
|---|---|---|---|---|---|---|---|---|
| Scheoeder | 11/18 | 132 | 2 | 0 | 2 | 25 | 51 | 120.6 |

Redskins Rushing
| | Car^{2} | Yds | TD | LG^{3} |
|---|---|---|---|---|
| Rogers | 30 | 125 | 0 | 14 |
| Smith | 7 | 54 | 0 | 16 |
| Monk | 3 | 54 | 0 | 26 |
| Bryant | 9 | 46 | 0 | 15 |
| Schroeder | 3 | 15 | 1 | 13 |
| Griffin | 1 | 5 | 0 | 5 |

Redskins Receiving
| | Rec^{4} | Yds | TD | LG^{3} |
|---|---|---|---|---|
| Monk | 5 | 38 | 0 | 11 |
| Bryant | 3 | 19 | 2 | 12 |
| Clark | 2 | 72 | 0 | 51 |
| Rogers | 1 | 3 | 0 | 35 |

Redskins Kicking
| | FGM–FGA | XPM–XPA |
|---|---|---|
| Haji-Sheikh | 2–2 | 3–3 |

Redskins Punting
| | Pnt | Yds | Y/P | Lng | Blck |
|---|---|---|---|---|---|
| Cox | 5 | 222 | 44.4 | | |

Redskins Kick Returns
| | Ret | Yds | Y/Rt | TD | Lng |
|---|---|---|---|---|---|
| Griffin | 1 | 15 | 15.0 | 0 | 0 |

Redskins Punt Returns
| | Ret | Yds | Y/Rt | TD | Lng |
|---|---|---|---|---|---|
| Yarber | 2 | 25 | 12.5 | 0 | 0 |

Redskins Sacks
| | Sacks |
|---|---|
| Manley | 2.0 |
| Milot | 1.0 |

Redskins Interceptions
| | Int | Yds | TD | LG | PD |
|---|---|---|---|---|---|
| Coleman | 1 | 28 | 0 | 28 | 0 |
| Bowles | 1 | 24 | 0 | 24 | 0 |
| Wilburn | 1 | 0 | 0 | 0 | 0 |

=== Week 9: at Philadelphia Eagles ===
Week 9: Washington Redskins at Philadelphia Eagles – Game summary

| Quarter | 1 | 2 | 3 | 4 | Total |
|---|---|---|---|---|---|
| Redskins | 7 | 14 | 0 | 6 | 27 |
| Eagles | 7 | 10 | 0 | 14 | 31 |

at Veterans Stadium, Philadelphia, Pennsylvania

- Date: November 8
- Game time: 1:00 p.m. EST
- Game weather: 52 °F (11 °C)
- Game attendance: 63,609
- Referee: Fred Wyant
- TV announcers (CBS): Dick Stockton and Terry Bradshaw
- Box score

Game information

First quarter

- PHI – Anthony Toney 3-yard run (Paul McFadden kick), 8:50. Eagles 7–0.
- WAS – George Rogers 3-yard run (Ali Haji-Sheikh kick), 3:41. Tied 7–7.

Second quarter

- WAS – Art Monk 19-yard pass from Jay Schroeder (Ali Haji-Sheikh kick), 8:56. Redskins 14–7.
- WAS – Darrell Green 26-yard fumble return (Ali Haji-Sheikh kick), 5:25. Redskins 21–7.
- PHI – Paul McFadden 37-yard field goal, 2:33. Redskins 21–10.
- PHI – Mike Quick 6-yard pass from Randall Cunningham (Paul McFadden kick), 0:14. Redskins 21–17.

Third quarter

- No scoring plays

Fourth quarter

- PHI – Mike Quick 32-yard pass from Randall Cunningham (Paul McFadden kick), 7:13. Eagles 24–21.
- WAS – Gary Clark 47-yard pass from Jay Schroeder (kick failed), 2:29. Redskins 27–24.
- PHI – Gregg Garrity 40-yard pass from Randall Cunningham (Paul McFadden kick), 1:06. Eagles 31–27.

Top passers

- WAS – Jay Schroeder – 16/46, 265 yards, 2 TD, 2 INT
- PHI – Randall Cunningham – 18/31, 268 yards, 3 TD, 3 INT

Top rushers

- WAS – George Rogers – 19 rushes, 80 yards, TD
- PHI – Anthony Toney – 20 rushes, 87 yards, TD

Top receivers

- WAS – Kelvin Bryant – 5 receptions, 57 yards
- PHI – Anthony Toney – 6 receptions, 38 yards

=== Week 10: vs. Detroit Lions ===
Week 10: Detroit Lions at Washington Redskins – Game summary

| Quarter | 1 | 2 | 3 | 4 | Total |
|---|---|---|---|---|---|
| Lions | 3 | 0 | 10 | 0 | 13 |
| Redskins | 0 | 17 | 3 | 0 | 20 |

at RFK Stadium, Washington, D.C.

- Date: November 15
- Game time: 1:00 p.m. EST
- Game weather: 49 °F (9 °C)
- Game attendance: 53,593
- Referee: Ben Dreith
- TV announcers (CBS): Verne Lundquist and Dick Vermeil
- Box score

Game information

First quarter

- DET – Eddie Murray 40-yard field goal, 7:16. Lions 3–0.

Second quarter

- WAS – Ali Haji-Sheikh 33-yard field goal, 14:51. Tied 3–3.
- WAS – Kelvin Bryant 16-yard pass from Doug Williams (Ali Haji-Sheikh kick), 2:27. Redskins 10–3.
- WAS – Gary Clark 42-yard pass from Doug Williams (Ali Haji-Sheikh kick), 0:27. Redskins 17–3.

Third quarter

- DET – Eddie Murray 41-yard field goal, 11:18. Redskins 17–6.
- WAS – Ali Haji-Sheikh 41-yard field goal, 5:37. Redskins 20–6.
- DET – Karl Bernard 2-yard run (Eddie Murray kick), 1:51. Redskins 20–13.

Top passers

- DET – Chuck Long – 23/37, 249 yards, 4 INT
- WAS – Doug Williams – 11/18, 161 yards, 2 TD

Top rushers

- DET – James Jones – 16 rushes, 53 yards
- WAS – George Rogers – 9 rushes, 56 yards

Top receivers

- DET – Jeff Chadwick – 7 receptions, 94 yards
- WAS – Kelvin Bryant – 5 receptions, 42 yards, TD

=== Week 11: vs. Los Angeles Rams ===
Week 11: Los Angeles Rams at Washington Redskins – Game summary

| Quarter | 1 | 2 | 3 | 4 | Total |
|---|---|---|---|---|---|
| Rams | 14 | 9 | 7 | 0 | 30 |
| Redskins | 9 | 7 | 3 | 7 | 26 |

at RFK Stadium, Washington, D.C.

- Date: November 23
- Game time: 9:00 p.m. EST
- Game weather: 38 °F (3 °C)
- Game attendance: 53,614
- TV announcers (ABC): Frank Gifford and Dan Dierdorf
- Box score

Game information

First quarter

- LAR – Mike Wilcher 35-yard fumble return (Mike Lansford kick). Rams 7–0.
- WAS – Art Monk 17-yard pass from Doug Williams (kick failed). Rams 7–6.
- WAS – Ali Haji-Sheikh 22-yard field goal. Redskins 9–7.
- LAR – Ron Brown 95-yard kickoff return (Mike Lansford kick). Rams 14–9.

Second quarter

- LAR – Mike Lansford 37-yard field goal. Rams 17–9.
- LAR – Charles White 1-yard run (kick failed). Rams 23–9.
- WAS – Doug Williams 1-yard run (Ali Haji-Sheikh kick). Rams 23–16.

Third quarter

- WAS – Ali Haji-Sheikh 29-yard field goal. Rams 23–19.
- LAR – Ron Brown 26-yard pass from Jim Everett (Mike Lansford kick). Rams 30–19.

Fourth quarter

- WAS – Art Monk 5-yard pass from Doug Williams (Ali Haji-Sheikh kick). Rams 30–26.

Top passers

- LAR – Jim Everett – 7/13, 106 yards, TD, INT
- WAS – Doug Williams – 24/46, 308 yards, 2 TD, INT

Top rushers

- LAR – Charles White – 35 rushes, 112 yards, TD
- WAS – Kelvin Bryant – 7 rushes, 46 yards

Top receivers

- LAR – Ron Brown – 2 receptions, 39 yards, TD
- WAS – Art Monk – 5 receptions, 93 yards, 2 TD

=== Week 12: vs. New York Giants ===
Week 12: New York Giants at Washington Redskins – Game summary

| Quarter | 1 | 2 | 3 | 4 | Total |
|---|---|---|---|---|---|
| Giants | 10 | 6 | 3 | 0 | 19 |
| Redskins | 0 | 0 | 9 | 14 | 23 |

at RFK Stadium, Washington, D.C.

- Date: November 29
- Game time: 4:00 p.m. EST
- Game weather: 52 °F (11 °C)
- Game attendance: 45,815
- Referee: Pat Haggerty
- TV announcers (CBS): Pat Summerall and John Madden
- Box score

Game information

First quarter

- NYG – Raúl Allegre 24-yard field goal. Giants 3–0.
- NYG – Mark Bavaro 30-yard pass from Phil Simms (Raúl Allegre kick). Giants 10–0.

Second quarter

- NYG – Raúl Allegre 42-yard field goal. Giants 13–0.
- NYG – Raúl Allegre 30-yard field goal. Giants 16–0.

Third quarter

- WAS – Ali Haji-Sheikh 41-yard field goal. Giants 16–3.
- NYG – Raúl Allegre 45-yard field goal. Giants 19–3.
- WAS – Gary Clark 34-yard pass from Jay Schroeder (kick failed). Giants 19–9.

Fourth quarter

- WAS – Keith Griffin 6-yard pass from Jay Schroeder (Ali Haji-Sheikh kick). Giants 19–16.
- WAS – Ricky Sanders 28-yard pass from Jay Schroeder (Ali Haji-Sheikh kick). Redskins 23–19.

Top passers

- NYG – Phil Simms – 12/29, 236 yards, TD, INT
- WAS – Jay Schroeder – 28/46, 331 yards, 3 TD, 2 INT

Top rushers

- NYG – Joe Morris – 27 rushes, 76 yards
- WAS – Kelvin Bryant – 11 rushes, 45 yards

Top receivers

- NYG – Tony Galbreath – 4 receptions, 54 yards
- WAS – Gary Clark – 7 receptions, 112 yards, TD

=== Week 13: at St. Louis Cardinals ===
Week 13: Washington Redskins at St. Louis Cardinals – Game summary

| Quarter | 1 | 2 | 3 | 4 | Total |
|---|---|---|---|---|---|
| Redskins | 10 | 0 | 21 | 3 | 34 |
| Cardinals | 0 | 14 | 3 | 0 | 17 |

at Busch Memorial Stadium, St. Louis, Missouri

- Date: December 6
- Game time: 1:00 p.m. EST/12:00 p.m. CST
- Game weather: 39 °F (4 °C)
- Game attendance: 31,324
- Referee: Tom Dooley
- TV announcers (CBS): Tim Ryan and Joe Theismann
- Box score

Game information

First quarter

- WAS – Gary Clark 84-yard pass from Jay Schroeder (Ali Haji-Sheikh kick). Redskins 7–0.
- WAS – Ali Haji-Sheikh 22-yard field goal. Redskins 10–0.

Second quarter

- STL – Stump Mitchell 3-yard pass from Neil Lomax (Jim Gallery kick). Redskins 10–7.
- STL – J. T. Smith 4-yard pass from Neil Lomax (Jim Gallery kick). Cardinals 14–10.

Third quarter

- STL – Jim Gallery 48-yard field goal. Cardinals 17–10.
- WAS – Jay Schroeder 7-yard run (Ali Haji-Sheikh kick). Tied 17–17.
- WAS – George Rogers 6-yard run (Ali Haji-Sheikh kick). Redskins 24–17.
- WAS – Clint Didier 19-yard pass from Jay Schroeder (Ali Haji-Sheikh kick). Redskins 31–17.

Fourth quarter

- WAS – Ali Haji-Sheikh 40-yard field goal. Redskins 34–17.

Top passers

- WAS – Jay Schroeder – 13/25, 235 yards, 2 TD, INT
- STL – Neil Lomax – 21/39, 241 yards, 2 TD

Top rushers

- WAS – George Rogers – 29 rushes, 133 yards, TD
- STL – Stump Mitchell – 20 rushes, 101 yards

Top receivers

- WAS – Gary Clark – 5 receptions, 130 yards, TD
- STL – Roy Green – 6 receptions, 90 yards

=== Week 14: vs. Dallas Cowboys ===
Week 14: Dallas Cowboys at Washington Redskins – Game summary

| Quarter | 1 | 2 | 3 | 4 | Total |
|---|---|---|---|---|---|
| Cowboys | 3 | 0 | 10 | 7 | 20 |
| Redskins | 7 | 10 | 7 | 0 | 24 |

at RFK Stadium, Washington, D.C.

- Date: December 13
- Game time: 1:00 p.m. EST
- Game weather: 46 °F (8 °C)
- Game attendance: 54,882
- Referee: Gordon McCarter
- TV announcers (CBS): Pat Summerall and John Madden
- Box score

Game information

First quarter

- WAS – George Rogers 1-yard run (Ali Haji-Sheikh kick). Redskins 7–0.
- DAL – Roger Ruzek 22-yard field goal. Redskins 7–3.

Second quarter

- WAS – Ali Haji-Sheikh 31-yard field goal. Redskins 10–3.
- WAS – Gary Clark 56-yard pass from Jay Schroeder (Ali Haji-Sheikh kick). Redskins 17–3.

Third quarter

- WAS – George Rogers 1-yard run (Ali Haji-Sheikh kick). Redskins 24–3.
- DAL – Roger Ruzek 37-yard field goal. Redskins 24–6.
- DAL – Mike Renfro 25-yard pass from Danny White (Roger Ruzek kick). Redskins 24–13.

Fourth quarter

- DAL – Rod Barksdale 5-yard pass from Danny White (Roger Ruzek kick). Redskins 24–20.

Top passers

- DAL – Danny White – 27/49, 359 yards, 2 TD, INT
- WAS – Jay Schroeder – 13/26, 250 yards, TD, INT

Top rushers

- DAL – Herschel Walker – 14 rushes, 44 yards
- WAS – George Rogers – 27 rushes, 64 yards, 2 TD

Top receivers

- DAL – Mike Renfro – 6 receptions, 97 yards, TD
- WAS – Gary Clark – 9 receptions, 187 yards, TD

=== Week 15: at Miami Dolphins ===
Week 15: Washington Redskins at Miami Dolphins – Game summary

| Quarter | 1 | 2 | 3 | 4 | Total |
|---|---|---|---|---|---|
| Redskins | 0 | 7 | 7 | 7 | 21 |
| Dolphins | 0 | 9 | 0 | 14 | 23 |

at Joe Robbie Stadium, Miami Gardens, Florida

- Date: December 20
- Game time: 8:00 p.m. EST
- Game weather: 74 °F (23 °C)
- Game attendance: 65,715
- Referee: Fred Wyant
- TV announcers (ESPN): Mike Patrick, Roy Firestone and Larry Csonka
- Box score

Game information

First quarter

- No scoring plays

Second quarter

- MIA – Fuad Reveiz 48-yard field goal. Dolphins 3–0.
- WAS – Kelvin Bryant 6-yard run (Ali Haji-Sheikh kick). Redskins 7–3.
- MIA – Mark Duper 26-yard pass from Dan Marino (kick failed). Dolphins 9–7.

Third quarter

- WAS – Jay Schroeder 6-yard run (Ali Haji-Sheikh kick). Redskins 14–9.

Fourth quarter

- MIA – Mark Duper 59-yard pass from Dan Marino (Fuad Reveiz kick). Dolphins 16–14.
- WAS – George Rogers 2-yard run (Ali Haji-Sheikh kick). Redskins 21–16.
- MIA – Mark Duper 6-yard pass from Dan Marino (Fuad Reveiz kick). Dolphins 23–21.

Top passers

- WAS – Jay Schroeder – 19/38, 272 yards, INT
- MIA – Dan Marino – 22/50, 393 yards, 3 TD, INT

Top rushers

- WAS – Kelvin Bryant – 9 rushes, 84 yards, TD
- MIA – Troy Stradford – 12 rushes, 49 yards

Top receivers

- WAS – Kelvin Bryant – 5 receptions, 69 yards
- MIA – Mark Duper – 6 receptions, 170 yards, 3 TD

=== Week 16: at Minnesota Vikings ===
Week 16: Washington Redskins at Minnesota Vikings – Game summary

| Quarter | 1 | 2 | 3 | 4 | OT | Total |
|---|---|---|---|---|---|---|
| Redskins | 0 | 7 | 7 | 10 | 3 | 27 |
| Vikings | 7 | 0 | 0 | 17 | 0 | 24 |

at Hubert H. Humphrey Metrodome, Minneapolis, Minnesota

- Date: December 26
- Game time: 4:00 p.m. EST/3:00 p.m. CST
- Game weather: None (played indoors)
- Game attendance: 59,160
- TV: CBS
- Box score

Game information

First quarter

- MIN – Alfred Anderson (Chuck Nelson kick). Vikings 7–0.

Second quarter

- WAS – Barry Wilburn 100-yard interception return (Ali Haji-Sheikh kick). Tied 7–7.

Third quarter

- WAS – Ricky Sanders 46-yard pass from Doug Williams (Ali Haji-Sheikh kick). Redskins 14–7.

Fourth quarter

- MIN – Alfred Anderson 1-yard run (Chuck Nelson kick). Tied 14–14.
- MIN – Wade Wilson 1-yard run (Chuck Nelson kick). Vikings 21–14.
- MIN – Chuck Nelson 20-yard field goal. Vikings 24–14.
- WAS – Ali Haji-Sheikh 37-yard field goal. Vikings 24–17.
- WAS – Ricky Sanders 51-yard pass from Doug Williams (Ali Haji-Sheikh kick). Tied 24–24.

Overtime

- WAS – Ali Haji-Sheikh 26-yard field goal. Redskins 27–24.

Top passers

- WAS – Doug Williams – 11/22, 217 yards, 2 TD, 2 INT
- MIN – Wade Wilson – 14/27, 206 yards, 3 INT

Top rushers

- WAS – George Rogers – 10 rushes, 51 yards
- MIN – Wade Wilson – 10 rushes, 75 yards, TD

Top receivers

- WAS – Ricky Sanders – 8 receptions, 164 yards, 2 TD
- MIN – Steve Jordan – 5 receptions, 65 yards

=== Standings ===
NFC East
| | W | L | T | PCT | DIV | CONF | PF | PA | STK |
|---|---|---|---|---|---|---|---|---|---|
| ^{(3)} Washington Redskins | 11 | 4 | 0 | .733 | 7–1 | 9–3 | 379 | 285 | W1 |
| Dallas Cowboys | 7 | 8 | 0 | .467 | 4–4 | 5–7 | 340 | 348 | W2 |
| St. Louis Cardinals | 7 | 8 | 0 | .467 | 3–5 | 7–7 | 362 | 368 | L1 |
| Philadelphia Eagles | 7 | 8 | 0 | .467 | 3–5 | 4–7 | 337 | 380 | W2 |
| New York Giants | 6 | 9 | 0 | .400 | 3–5 | 4–8 | 280 | 312 | W2 |

== Postseason ==
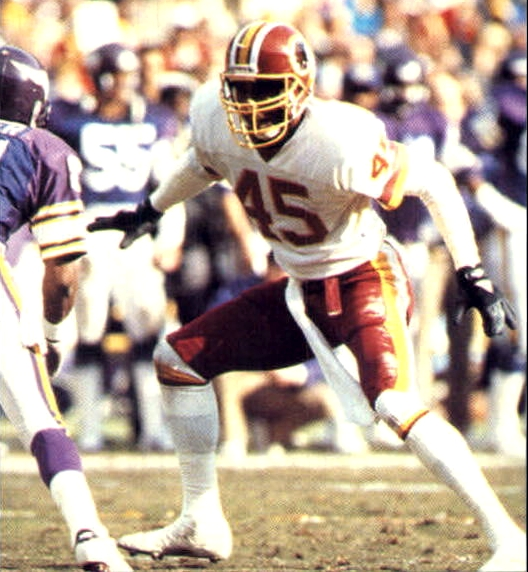
Redskins cornerback Barry Wilburn, pictured in the NFC Championship game, was a key player in Washington's defensive unit who snagged two interceptions during Super Bowl XXII.

=== Schedule ===
| Playoff Round | Date | Opponent (Seed) | Result | Record | Game site | NFL.com recap |
|---|---|---|---|---|---|---|
| Divisional | January 10 | at Chicago Bears (2) | W 21–17 | 1–0 | Soldier Field | Recap |
| NFC Championship | January 17, 1988 | Minnesota Vikings (5) | W 17–10 | 2–0 | RFK Stadium | Recap |
| Super Bowl XXII | January 31, 1988 | Denver Broncos (A1) | W 42–10 | 3–0 | Jack Murphy Stadium | Recap |

=== NFC Divisional Playoffs (Sunday, January 10, 1988): at Chicago Bears ===
NFC Divisional Playoffs: (3) Washington Redskins at (2) Chicago Bears – Game summary

| Quarter | 1 | 2 | 3 | 4 | Total |
|---|---|---|---|---|---|
| Redskins (1–0) | 0 | 14 | 7 | 0 | 21 |
| Bears (0–1) | 7 | 7 | 3 | 0 | 17 |

at Soldier Field • Chicago, Illinois

- Date: January 10, 1988
- Game time: 12:30 p.m. EST/11:30 a.m. CST
- Game weather: 4 °F (−16 °C), relative humidity 65%, wind 11 miles per hour (18 km/h; 9.6 kn), wind chill −20 °F (−29 °C)
- Game attendance: 65,268
- Referee: Pat Haggerty
- TV announcers (CBS): Pat Summerall (play-by-play), John Madden (color commentator) and Irv Cross (sidelines)

| Team | Category | Player | Statistics |
|---|---|---|---|
| WSH | Passing | Doug Williams | 14/29, YDS, 1 TD, 1 INT |
| WSH | Rushing | Timmy Smith | 16 CAR, 66 YDS |
| WSH | Receiving | Ricky Sanders | 6 REC, 92 YDS |
| CHI | Passing | Jim McMahon | 15/29, 197 YDS, 1 TD, 3 INTs |
| CHI | Rushing | Walter Payton | 18 CAR, 85 YDS |
| CHI | Receiving | Ron Morris | 2 REC, 47 YDS, 1 TD |

Scoring summary

| Quarter | Time | Drive | | | Team | Scoring information | Score | |
| Quarter | Time | Plays | Yards | TOP | Team | Scoring information | WSH | CHI |
|---|---|---|---|---|---|---|---|---|
| 1 | 6:23 | | | | Bears | Thomas 2-yard touchdown run, Butler kick good | 0 | 7 |
| 2 | 8:06 | | | | Bears | Morris 14-yard touchdown reception from McMahon, Butler kick good | 0 | 14 |
| 2 | 4:51 | | | | Redskins | Rogers 3-yard touchdown run, Haji-Sheikh kick good | 7 | 14 |
| 2 | 0:51 | | | | Redskins | Didier 14-yard touchdown reception from Williams, Haji-Sheikh kick good | 14 | 14 |
| 3 | 11:40 | — | — | — | Redskins | Green 52-yard punt return, Haji-Sheikh kick good | 21 | 14 |
| 3 | 4:47 | | | | Bears | 25-yard field goal by Kevin Butler | 21 | 17 |
| "TOP" = time of possession. For other American football terms, see Glossary of American football. | | | | | | | 21 | 17 |

- Point spread: Redskins +4½
- Over/under: 38.0 (push)
- Time of game: 3 hours, 5 minutes

| Redskins | Game statistics | Bears |
|---|---|---|
| 17 | First downs | 15 |
| 29–72 | Rushes–yards | 30–110 |
| 207 | Passing yards | 197 |
| 14–29–1 | Passes | 15–29–3 |
| 1–7 | Sacked–yards | 5–27 |
| 200 | Net passing yards | 170 |
| 272 | Total yards | 280 |
| 144 | Return yards | 115 |
| 4–42.3 | Punts | 4–36.3 |
| 1–1 | Fumbles–lost | 1–0 |
| 3–20 | Penalties–yards | 5–50 |
| 27:03 | Time of possession | 32:57 |

Individual stats

Redskins Passing
| | C/ATT^{1} | Yds | TD | INT | Sk | Yds | LG^{3} | Rate |
|---|---|---|---|---|---|---|---|---|
| Williams | 14/29 | 207 | 1 | 1 | 1 | 7 | 32 | 69.2 |

Redskins Rushing
| | Car^{2} | Yds | TD | LG^{3} |
|---|---|---|---|---|
| Smith | 16 | 66 | 0 | 13 |
| Rogers | 6 | 13 | 1 | 4 |
| Bryant | 3 | 8 | 0 | 6 |
| Williams | 2 | −1 | 0 | 0 |
| Clark | 1 | −6 | 0 | −6 |
| Schroeder | 1 | −8 | 0 | −8 |

Redskins Receiving
| | Rec^{4} | Yds | TD | LG^{3} |
|---|---|---|---|---|
| Sanders | 6 | 92 | 0 | 32 |
| Clark | 4 | 56 | 0 | 21 |
| Didier | 2 | 32 | 1 | 18 |
| Warren | 1 | 16 | 0 | 16 |
| Rogers | 1 | 11 | 0 | 11 |

Redskins Kicking
| | FGM–FGA | XPM–XPA |
|---|---|---|
| Haji-Sheikh | | 3–3 |

Redskins Punting
| | Pnt | Yds | Y/P | Lng | Blck |
|---|---|---|---|---|---|
| Cox | 4 | 169 | 42.3 | | |

Redskins Kick Returns
| | Ret | Yds | Y/Rt | TD | Lng |
|---|---|---|---|---|---|
| Sanders | 2 | 25 | 12.5 | 0 | 13 |
| Smith | 1 | 19 | 19.0 | 0 | 19 |
| Branch | 1 | 12 | 12.0 | 0 | 12 |

Redskins Punt Returns
| | Ret | Yds | Y/Rt | TD | Lng |
|---|---|---|---|---|---|
| Green | 1 | 52 | 52.0 | 1 | 52 |
| Yarber | 2 | 13 | 6.5 | 0 | 8 |

Redskins Sacks
| | Sacks |
|---|---|
| Mann | 3.0 |
| Hamilton | 1.0 |
| Grant | 0.5 |
| Koch | 0.5 |

Redskins Interceptions
| | Int | Yds | TD | LG | PD |
|---|---|---|---|---|---|
| Davis | 1 | 23 | 0 | 23 | |
| Wilburn | 1 | 0 | 0 | 0 | |
| Woodberry | 1 | 0 | 0 | 0 | |

After a first-round bye, Washington's playoff run began in the divisional round at Chicago. The Bears were the NFC's 2nd-seed, having finished the regular season at 11–4 and winning the NFC Central. Chicago jumped out to a 14–0 lead, but Washington would score 21 unanswered points, winning the game 21–17.

==== NFC Championship vs. Minnesota Vikings ====
NFC Championship: (5) Minnesota Vikings at (3) Washington Redskins – Game summary

| Quarter | 1 | 2 | 3 | 4 | Total |
|---|---|---|---|---|---|
| Vikings | 0 | 7 | 0 | 3 | 10 |
| Redskins | 7 | 0 | 3 | 7 | 17 |

at RFK Stadium, Washington, D.C.

- Date: January 17, 1988
- Game time: 12:30 p.m. EST
- Game weather: 35 °F (2 °C)
- Game attendance: 55,212
- Referee: Ben Dreith
- TV announcers (CBS): Pat Summerall and John Madden
- Box score

Game information

First quarter

- WAS – Kelvin Bryant 42-yard pass from Doug Williams (Ali Haji-Sheikh kick). Redskins 7–0.

Second quarter

- MIN – Leo Lewis 23-yard pass from Wade Wilson (Chuck Nelson kick). Tied 7–7.

Third quarter

- WAS – Ali Haji-Sheikh 28-yard field goal. Redskins 10–7.

Fourth quarter

- MIN – Chuck Nelson 18-yard field goal. Tied 10–10.
- WAS – Gary Clark 7-yard pass from Doug Williams (Ali Haji-Sheikh kick). Redskins 17–10.

Top passers

- MIN – Wade Wilson – 19/39, 243 yards, TD, INT
- WAS – Doug Williams – 9/26, 119 yards, 2 TD

Top rushers

- MIN – Wade Wilson – 4 rushes, 28 yards
- WAS – Timmy Smith – 13 rushes, 72 yards

Top receivers

- MIN – Anthony Carter – 7 receptions 85 yards
- WAS – Gary Clark – 3 receptions, 57 yards, TD

After defeating the Bears in the divisional round, the Redskins hosted the surprising Minnesota Vikings in the NFC championship. Minnesota just scraped into the playoffs, finishing the regular season 8–7, earning the NFC's fifth and final seed. The Vikings finished the regular season losing three of their last four, but pulled off two major upsets once the playoffs started. Minnesota defeated the 12–3 New Orleans Saints 44–10 in the wild card round, then took down the NFC's top seed, the San Francisco 49ers, 36–24 in the divisional round.

Washington would end Minnesota's run of upsets, limiting the Vikings' run game to only 76 yards and sacked quarterback Wade Wilson eight times. The Vikings' defense would limit Doug Williams, who finished the game only completing 9 passes on 26 attempts for 119 yards. The Redskins' defense prevented a game-tying touchdown in the final minute of regulation to give Washington the 17–10 victory and send the team to the Super Bowl for the fourth time in franchise history.

==== Super Bowl XXII ====
Super Bowl XXII: (N3) Washington Redskins vs. (A1) Denver Broncos – Game summary

| Quarter | 1 | 2 | 3 | 4 | Total |
|---|---|---|---|---|---|
| Redskins | 0 | 35 | 0 | 7 | 42 |
| Broncos | 10 | 0 | 0 | 0 | 10 |

at Jack Murphy Stadium, San Diego, California

- Date: January 31, 1988
- Game time: 6:00 p.m. EST/3:00 p.m. PST
- Game weather: Partly cloudy, 61 °F (16 °C)
- Game attendance: 73,302
- Referee: Bob McElwee
- TV announcers (ABC): Al Michaels, Frank Gifford and Dan Dierdorf
- Box score

Game information

First quarter

- DEN – Ricky Nattiel 56-yard pass from John Elway (Rich Karlis kick), 13:03. Broncos 7–0. Drive: 1 play, 56 yards, 0:08.
- DEN – Rich Karlis 24-yard field goal, 9:09. Broncos 10–0. Drive: 7 plays, 61 yards, 2:05.

Second quarter

- WAS – Ricky Sanders 80-yard pass from Doug Williams (Ali Haji-Sheikh kick), 14:07. Broncos 10–7. Drive: 1 play, 80 yards, 0:10.
- WAS – Gary Clark 27-yard pass from Doug Williams (Ali Haji-Sheikh kick), 10:15. Redskins 14–10. Drive: 5 plays, 64 yards, 2:44.
- WAS – Timmy Smith 58-yard run (Ali Haji-Sheikh kick), 6:27. Redskins 21–10. Drive: 2 plays, 74 yards, 0:51.
- WAS – Ricky Sanders 50-yard pass from Doug Williams (Ali Haji-Sheikh kick), 3:42. Redskins 28–10. Drive: 3 plays, 60 yards, 0:52.
- WAS – Clint Didier 8-yard pass from Doug Williams (Ali Haji-Sheikh kick), 1:04. Redskins 35–10. Drive: 7 plays, 79 yards, 1:10.

Third quarter

- No scoring plays

Fourth quarter

- WAS – Timmy Smith 4-yard run (Ali Haji-Sheikh kick), 13:09. Redskins 42–10. Drive: 4 plays, 68 yards, 2:03.

Top passers

- WAS – Doug Williams – 18/29, 340 yards, 4 TD, INT
- DEN – John Elway – 14/38, 257 yards, TD, 3 INT

Top rushers

- WAS – Timmy Smith – 22 rushes, 204 yards, 2 TD
- DEN – Gene Lang – 5 rushes, 38 yards

Top receivers

- WAS – Ricky Sanders – 9 receptions, 193 yards, 2 TD
- DEN – Mark Jackson – 4 receptions, 76 yards

After defeating the Vikings in the NFC championship, the Redskins faced off against the AFC champion Denver Broncos, who were making their second-straight Super Bowl appearance. The Broncos faced off against the Browns in the AFC Championship Game, with Denver having a 38–31 lead in the waning minutes of the game. The Browns drove down the field and looked like they would score the game-tying touchdown, but running back Earnest Byner was stripped of the ball at the goal line by Bronco cornerback Jeremiah Castille and recovered the ball for Denver. This was the Redskins' fourth Super Bowl appearance and the third overall for the Broncos.

The Broncos jumped out to a 10–0 first quarter lead, with Denver finishing the quarter with 142 yards against Washington's 64. Starting quarterback Doug Williams briefly exited the game late in the first quarter and early in the second due to a possible leg injury, with Jay Schroeder entering the game. Williams's return to the game ignited a spark in the Redskins' offense, scoring 35-straight points to lead 35–10 at halftime. After a scoreless third quarter, Washington would score the last points of the game in the fourth to go up 42–10. After a slow first quarter, the team would score 42 unanswered points and gained 602 yards of total offense.

Williams was named the game's MVP, finishing 18-of-29 for 340 yards, with four touchdowns, and one interception, breaking the Super Bowl record for most passing yards. Washington broke other Super Bowl records, including most rushing yards by a player (Timmy Smith, with 204), most receiving yards by a player (Ricky Sanders, with 193), and most extra points made (Ali Haji-Sheikh, with 6). The 45 combined points scored in the first half set the record for most points scored in a half, while the 7 points scored in the second half set the record for the fewest points scored in a half. This was Washington's second Super Bowl victory, having previously won Super Bowl XVII 27–17 over the Miami Dolphins.

== Legacy ==
While the replacement players all received large playoff shares for their part in the 1987 season, the only replacement player to receive a Super Bowl ring was wide receiver Anthony Allen, because he was on the active roster during the postseason (and made one reception in the NFC title game vs. Minnesota). On March 8, 2018, the Redskins announced that they would honor the replacement players from the 1987 team with Super Bowl XXII rings.

NFL Films produced a documentary about the team's season entitled Second to None; it was narrated by Pat Summerall. On March 2, 2007, NFL Network aired America's Game: The Super Bowl Champions, the 1987 Washington Redskins, with team commentary from Doug Williams, Jeff Bostic and Darrell Green, and narrated by Gene Hackman. A 30 for 30 documentary on the season, titled Year of the Scab, released in 2017.

== Statistics ==
=== Team ===
| Category | Total yards | Yards per game | NFL rank (out of 28) |
|---|---|---|---|
| Passing offense | 3,495 | 233.0 | 4th |
| Rushing offense | 2,102 | 140.1 | 7th |
| Total offense | 5,597 | 373.1 | 3rd |
| Passing defense | 3,343 | 222.9 | 24th |
| Rushing defense | 1,679 | 111.9 | 10th |
| Total defense | 5,022 | 334.8 | 18th |

=== Individual ===
| Category | Player | Total |
Offense
| Passing yards | Jay Schroeder | 1,878 |
| Passing touchdowns | Jay Schroeder | 12 |
| Rushing yards | George Rogers | 613 |
| Rushing touchdowns | George Rogers | 6 |
| Receiving yards | Gary Clark | 1,066 |
| Receiving touchdowns | Gary Clark | 7 |
Defense
| Tackles | Monte Coleman | 107 |
| Sacks | Charles Mann | 9.5 |
| Interceptions | Barry Wilburn | 9 |
