= 1988 Washington Redskins season =

NFL team season

- Owner: Jack Kent Cooke
- General manager: Bobby Beathard
- President: John Kent Cooke
- Head coach: Joe Gibbs
- Offensive coordinator: Joe Bugel
- Defensive coordinator: Richie Petitbon
- Home stadium: RFK Stadium

Results
- Record: 7–9
- Division place: 3rd NFC East
- Playoffs: Did not qualify
- Pro Bowlers: DE Charles Mann; RG/RT Mark May

The 1988 Washington Redskins season was the franchise's 57th season in the National Football League (NFL) and their 53rd in Washington, D.C. They failed to improve on their 11–4 record from 1987, when they won Super Bowl XXII, and finished 7–9. The Redskins failed to qualify for the playoffs for the first time since 1985. They were the seventh team in NFL history to enter a season as the defending Super Bowl champion and miss the playoffs.

The Week 8 game against Green Bay was the two teams' final meeting for 13 years.

The 7–9 finish would be the only time during Gibbs's first stint with the Redskins that the team finished with a losing record.

== Roster ==
1988 Washington Redskins roster
Quarterbacks (QB): 11 Mark Rypien; 17 Doug Williams; Running backs (RB): 29 Reggie Branch; 22 Jamie Morris; 25 Mike Oliphant; 36 Timmy Smith; Wide receivers (WR): 89 Anthony Allen; 84 Gary Clark; 81 Art Monk; 83 Ricky Sanders; 80 Derrick Shepard; Tight ends (TE): 88 Joe Caravello; 32 Craig McEwen; 86 Ron Middleton; 87 Terry Orr; 85 Don Warren	Offensive linemen (OL): 53 Jeff Bostic C; 68 Russ Grimm G; 66 Joe Jacoby T; 79 Jim Lachey T; 73 Mark May G/T; 63 Raleigh McKenzie C/G; 76 Ed Simmons T; 69 R.C. Thielemann G; Defensive linemen (DL): 65 Dave Butz DT; 77 Darryl Grant DT; 78 Dean Hamel DT; 64 Steve Hamilton DE; 72 Dexter Manley DE; 71 Charles Mann DE	Linebackers (LB): 50 Ravin Caldwell OLB; 51 Monte Coleman OLB; 54 Kurt Gouveia MLB; 55 Mel Kaufman OLB; 91 Greg Manusky; 58 Wilber Marshall OLB; 52 Neal Olkewicz MLB; Defensive backs (DB): 23 Todd Bowles FS; 37 Travis Curtis FS; 48 Steve Gage SS; 31 Clarence Vaughn SS; 40 Alvin Walton SS; 45 Barry Wilburn CB; 46 Dennis Woodberry CB; Special teams (ST): 15 Greg Coleman P; 59 Dave Harbour LS; 8 Chip Lohmiller K	Reserve: 14 Tommy Barnhardt P (IR); 95 Dan Benish DT (IR); -- Brian Bonner LB (IR); 24 Kelvin Bryant RB (IR); -- Dale Chipps WR (PUP); 56 Eric Coyle C (IR); 34 Brian Davis CB (IR); 75 Mark Duckens DT (IR); 28 Darrell Green CB (IR); 62 Ray Hitchcock C (PUP); 16 Stan Humphries QB (NF-Ill.); 61 Rick Kehr G (IR); 74 Markus Koch DE (IR); 39 Darryl McGill RB (IR); -- Carl Mims CB (NF-Inj.); -- Blake Peterson LB (IR); 38 Willard Reaves RB (IR); 47 Johnny Thomas CB (IR); -- Eric Yarber WR (IR); 47 active, 19 inactive Rookies in italics

== Regular season ==
=== Schedule ===
Week	Date	Opponent	Result	Record	Venue	Attendance	Recap
1	September 5	at **New York Giants**	**L** 20–27	0–1	Giants Stadium	76,417	Recap
2	September 11	Pittsburgh Steelers	**W** 30–29	1–1	RFK Stadium	54,083	Recap
3	September 18	**Philadelphia Eagles**	**W** 17–10	2–1	RFK Stadium	53,920	Recap
4	September 25	at **Phoenix Cardinals**	**L** 21–30	2–2	Sun Devil Stadium	61,973	Recap
5	October 2	**New York Giants**	**L** 23–24	2–3	RFK Stadium	54,601	Recap
6	October 9	at **Dallas Cowboys**	**W** 35–17	3–3	Texas Stadium	63,325	Recap
7	October 16	**Phoenix Cardinals**	**W** 33–17	4–3	RFK Stadium	54,402	Recap
8	October 23	at Green Bay Packers	**W** 20–17	5–3	Milwaukee County Stadium	51,767	Recap
9	October 30	at Houston Oilers	**L** 17–41	5–4	Astrodome	48,781	Recap
10	November 6	New Orleans Saints	**W** 27–24	6–4	RFK Stadium	54,183	Recap
11	November 13	Chicago Bears	**L** 14–34	6–5	RFK Stadium	52,418	Recap
12	November 21	at San Francisco 49ers	**L** 21–37	6–6	Candlestick Park	59,268	Recap
13	November 27	Cleveland Browns	**L** 13–17	6–7	RFK Stadium	51,604	Recap
14	December 4	at **Philadelphia Eagles**	**W** 20–19	7–7	Veterans Stadium	65,947	Recap
15	December 11	**Dallas Cowboys**	**L** 17–24	7–8	RFK Stadium	51,526	Recap
16	December 17	at Cincinnati Bengals	**L** 17–20 (OT)	7–9	Riverfront Stadium	52,157	Recap

Note: Intra-division opponents are in bold text.

=== Game summaries ===
==== Week 1 ====
Team	1	2	3	4	Total
Redskins	6	7	0	7	20
• Giants	0	3	10	14	27

- Date: September 5
- Location: Giants Stadium
- Game start: 8:00 p.m. EDT
- Game weather: 72 °F (22 °C)
- Referee: Dick Jorgensen
- TV announcers (ABC): Al Michaels, Frank Gifford and Dan Dierdorf

==== Week 2 ====
Team	1	2	3	4	Total
Steelers	3	10	6	10	29
• Redskins	7	3	7	13	30

- Date: September 11
- Location: RFK Stadium
- Game start: 1:00 p.m. EDT
- Game attendance: 54,083
- Game weather: 73 °F (23 °C)
- Referee: Gene Barth
- TV announcers (NBC): Curt Gowdy and Merlin Olsen

==== Week 14 ====
Team	1	2	3	4	Total
• Redskins	7	0	3	10	20
Eagles	3	13	3	0	19

- Date: December 4
- Location: Veterans Stadium
- Game start: 1:00 p.m. EST
- Game weather: 41 °F (5 °C)
- Referee: Ben Dreith
- TV announcers (CBS): Dick Stockton and Dan Fouts

=== Standings ===
NFC East
	W	L	T	PCT	DIV	CONF	PF	PA	STK
^{(3)} Philadelphia Eagles	10	6	0	.625	6–2	8–4	379	319	W2
New York Giants	10	6	0	.625	5–3	9–5	359	304	L1
Washington Redskins	7	9	0	.438	4–4	6–6	345	387	L2
Phoenix Cardinals	7	9	0	.438	3–5	6–6	344	398	L5
Dallas Cowboys	3	13	0	.188	2–6	3–9	265	381	L1

1988 Team Starters

Offense

17 Doug Williams     QB
32 Craig McEwan      RB
36 Timmy Smith       FB
81 Art Monk          WR
84 Gary Clark        WR
85 Don Warren        TE

66 Joe Jacoby        LT
63 Raleigh McKenzie  LG
53 Jeff Bostic       C
73 Mark May          RG
79 Jim Lachey        RT

Defense

71 Charles Mann     LDE
65 Dave Butz        LDT
77 Darryl Grant     RDT
72 Dexter Manley    RDT

51 Monte Coleman    LB
52 Neal Olkewicz    LB
58 Wilber Marshall  LB

45 Barry Wilburn    LCB
28 Darrell Green    RCB
40 Alvin Walton     SS
23 Todd Bowles      FS

8 Chip Lohmiller    K
15 Greg Coleman     P
80 Derrick Shepherd PR
22 Jamie Morris     KR

== Awards and honors ==
- Charles Mann, Pro Bowl selection
