= 1986 Washington Redskins season =

NFL team season

- Owner: Jack Kent Cooke
- General manager: Bobby Beathard
- President: John Kent Cooke
- Head coach: Joe Gibbs
- Offensive coordinator: Joe Bugel
- Defensive coordinator: Richie Petitbon
- Home stadium: RFK Stadium

Results
- Record: 12–4
- Division place: 2nd NFC East
- Playoffs: Won Wild Card Round (vs. Rams) 19–7; Won Divisional Round (at Bears) 27–13; Lost NFC Championship (at Giants) 0–17

The 1986 Washington Redskins season was the franchise's 55th season in the National Football League (NFL) and their 51st in Washington, D.C. The team improved on their 10–6 record from 1985 and returned to the playoffs after missing them the previous year, finishing with a 12–4 record, a second-place finish in the NFC East, and qualified for the playoffs as a wild card. They defeated the Los Angeles Rams 19–7 in the NFC Wild Card Game at RFK Stadium, then upset the defending champion Chicago Bears 27–13 in the Divisional Playoffs. The season came to an end in the NFC Championship Game when the Redskins were defeated by their division rivals, the New York Giants 17–0.

== Personnel ==
=== Coaches / Staff ===
1986 Washington Redskins staff
Front office: Owner / Chairman Of The Board – Jack Kent Cooke; Executive Vice President - John Kent Cooke; Senior Vice President - Gerard T. Gabrys; Director of Player Personnel - Dick Daniels; Director of Pro Scouting - Kirk Mee; General Manager – Bobby Beathard; Assistant General Manager - Bobby Mitchell; Assistant General Manager - Charley Casserly; Head coaches: Head Coach – Joe Gibbs; Assistant Head Coach – Richie Petitbon; Offensive coaches: Offensive Coordinator – Joe Bugel; Quarterbacks – Jerry Rhome; Running Backs – Don Breaux; Wide Receivers – Charley Taylor; Tight Ends – Rennie Simmons; Offensive Line – Joe Bugel	Defensive coaches: Defensive Coordinator – Larry Peccatiello; Defensive Coordinator – Richie Petitbon; Defensive Line – LaVern Torgeson; Special teams coaches: Special Teams – Wayne Sevier; Strength and conditioning: Strength and Conditioning Coach / Coordinator – Dan Riley; Assistant Strength Coach - John Dunn

=== Roster ===
1986 Washington Redskins roster
Quarterbacks (QB): 10 Jay Schroeder; 17 Doug Williams; Running backs (RB): 30 Dwight Garner; 35 Keith Griffin; 38 George Rogers; 29 Reggie Branch; 24 Kelvin Bryant; Wide receivers (WR): 84 Gary Clark; 81 Art Monk; 46 Ricky Sanders; 80 Eric Yarber; Tight ends (TE): 86 Clint Didier; 88 Todd Frain; 87 Terry Orr; 85 Don Warren	Offensive linemen (OL): 53 Jeff Bostic C; 68 Russ Grimm G; 66 Joe Jacoby T; 73 Mark May T; 63 Raleigh McKenzie G/C; 60 Dan McQuaid T; 69 R.C. Thielemann G; 76 Ron Tilton G; Defensive linemen (DL): 67 Tom Beasley DE; 65 Dave Butz DT; 77 Darryl Grant DT; 78 Dean Hamel DT; 74 Markus Koch DE/DT; 72 Dexter Manley DE; 71 Charles Mann DE	Linebackers (LB): 58 Shawn Burks MLB; 51 Monte Coleman OLB; 56 Calvin Daniels OLB; 57 Rich Milot OLB; 52 Neal Olkewicz MLB; Defensive backs (DB): 23 Todd Bowles FS; 48 Ken Coffey SS; 32 Vernon Dean CB; 28 Darrell Green CB; 22 Curtis Jordan FS; 41 Tim Morrison CB; 40 Alvin Walton SS; 45 Barry Wilburn CB; Special teams (ST): 4 Jess Atkinson K; 12 Steve Cox P	Reserve: 26 Rick Badanjek RB (IR); 50 Ravin Caldwell LB (IR); 61 Anthony Copeland LB (IR); -- Kurt Gouveia LB (IR); 64 Steve Hamilton DE/DT (IR); 88 Derek Holloway WR (IR); 31 Ken Jenkins RB (IR); 82 Anthony Jones TE (IR); 55 Mel Kaufman LB (IR); 54 Joe Krakoski LB (IR); 11 Mark Rypien QB (IR); 75 Bob Slater DT (IR); 89 Clarence Verdin WR (IR); 14 Max Zendejas K (IR); Rookies in italics

== Regular season ==
=== Schedule ===
Week	Date	Opponent	Result	Record	Venue	Attendance	Game recap
1	September 7	**Philadelphia Eagles**	**W** 41–14	1–0	RFK Stadium	53,982	Recap
2	September 14	Los Angeles Raiders	**W** 10–6	2–0	RFK Stadium	55,235	Recap
3	September 21	at San Diego Chargers	**W** 30–27	3–0	Jack Murphy Stadium	57,853	Recap
4	September 28	Seattle Seahawks	**W** 19–14	4–0	RFK Stadium	54,157	Recap
5	October 5	at New Orleans Saints	**W** 14–6	5–0	Louisiana Superdome	57,378	Recap
6	October 12	at **Dallas Cowboys**	**L** 6–30	5–1	Texas Stadium	63,264	Recap
7	October 19	**St. Louis Cardinals**	**W** 28–21	6–1	RFK Stadium	53,494	Recap
8	October 27	at **New York Giants**	**L** 20–27	6–2	Giants Stadium	75,923	Recap
9	November 2	Minnesota Vikings	**W** 44–38 (OT)	7–2	RFK Stadium	51,928	Recap
10	November 9	at Green Bay Packers	**W** 16–7	8–2	Lambeau Field	47,728	Recap
11	November 17	San Francisco 49ers	**W** 14–6	9–2	RFK Stadium	54,774	Recap
12	November 23	**Dallas Cowboys**	**W** 41–14	10–2	RFK Stadium	55,642	Recap
13	November 30	at **St. Louis Cardinals**	**W** 20–17	11–2	Busch Memorial Stadium	35,637	Recap
14	December 7	**New York Giants**	**L** 14–24	11–3	RFK Stadium	55,642	Recap
15	December 13	at Denver Broncos	**L** 30–31	11–4	Mile High Stadium	75,905	Recap
16	December 21	at **Philadelphia Eagles**	**W** 21–14	12–4	Veterans Stadium	61,816	Recap

Note: Intra-division opponents are in bold text.

=== Season summary ===
==== Week 1 vs Eagles ====
Week One: Philadelphia Eagles (0–0) at Washington Redskins (0–0)

Quarter	1	2	3	4	Total
Eagles	7	7	0	0	**14**
Redskins	3	17	14	7	**41**

at RFK Stadium • Washington, D.C.

- Date: September 7
- Game time: 1:00 p.m. EDT
- Game weather: 69 °F (21 °C) • Wind 9 miles per hour (14 km/h; 7.8 kn)
- Game attendance: 53,982
- Referee: Gene Barth
- TV: CBS
- Pro-Football-Reference.com, The Football Database

Game information

Eagles

- Ron Jaworski
  23/40, 227 Yds, 2 TD, INT
- Randall Cunningham
  2 Rush, 31 Yds
- Phil Smith
  3 Rec, 50 Yds

Redskins

- Jay Schroeder
  19/38, 238 Yds, 2 TD, INT
- George Rogers
  20 Rush, 104 Yds, TD
- Gary Clark
  7 Rec, 100 Yds

Scoring summary

Quarter	Time	Drive			Team	Scoring information	Score	
Quarter	Time	Plays	Yards	TOP	Team	Scoring information	PHI	WSH
1	9:21				Redskins	19-yard field goal by Mark Moseley	0	3
1	6:59				Eagles	Ron Johnson 17-yard touchdown reception from Ron Jaworski, Paul McFadden kick good	7	3
2	8:48				Redskins	Kelvin Bryant 36-yard touchdown reception from Jay Schroeder, Mark Moseley kick good	7	10
2	5:39				Redskins	Jay Schroeder 1-yard touchdown run, Mark Moseley kick good	7	17
2	0:33				Eagles	Junior Tautalatasi 3-yard touchdown reception from Ron Jaworski, Paul McFadden kick good	14	17
2	0:00				Redskins	55-yard field goal by Steve Cox	14	20
3	7:51				Redskins	Clint Didier 36-yard touchdown reception from Jay Scroeder, Mark Moseley kick good	14	27
3	4:26				Redskins	Kelvin Bryant 16-yard touchdown run, Mark Moseley kick good	14	34
4	3:36				Redskins	George Rogers 5-yard touchdown run, Mark Moseley kick good	14	41
"TOP" = time of possession. For other American football terms, see Glossary of American football.							14	41

==== Week 4: vs Seattle Seahawks ====
Week Four: Seattle Seahawks at Washington Redskins – Game summary

Quarter	1	2	3	4	Total
Seahawks	7	0	0	7	**14**
**Redskins**	6	3	7	3	**19**

at RFK Stadium, Washington, D.C.

- Date: September 28
- Game time: 1:00 pm local
- Game weather: cloudy, 67 °F (19 °C), 90% humidity, wind SE 6 miles per hour (9.7 km/h)
- Game attendance: 54,157
- Referee: Pat Haggerty
- TV announcers (NBC): Charlie Jones and Jimmy Cefalo
- Gamebook

Game information

**First quarter**

- SEA – Curt Warner 2-yard run (Norm Johnson kick), 10:05 (SEA 7–0)
- WAS – George Rogers 24-yard run (PAT failed), 5:21 (SEA 7–6)

**Second quarter**

- WAS – Steve Cox 57-yard field goal, 0:12 (WAS 9–7)

**Third quarter**

- WAS – George Rogers 7-yard run (Mark Moseley kick), 1:25 (WAS 16–7)

**Fourth quarter**

- WAS – Mark Moseley 36-yard field goal, 8:14 (WAS 19–7)
- SEA – Steve Largent 11-yard pass from Dave Krieg (Norm Johnson kick), 1:50 (WAS 19–14)

**Top passers**

- SEA – Dave Krieg: 19/32, 219 yds, 1 TD, 2 INT
- WAS – Jay Schroeder: 14/26, 195 yds

**Top rushers**

- SEA – Curt Warner: 16 car, 106 yds, 1 TD
- WAS – George Rogers: 25 car, 115 yds, 2 TD

**Top receivers**

- SEA – Byron Franklin: 5 rec, 79 yds
- WAS – Art Monk: 5 rec, 103 yds

**Team** – pass – rush – total – to

- SEA – 213 – 148 – 361 – 2
- WAS – 195 – 162 – 357 – 1

=== Standings ===
NFC East
	W	L	T	PCT	DIV	CONF	PF	PA	STK
^{(1)} New York Giants	14	2	0	.875	7–1	11–1	371	236	W9
^{(4)} Washington Redskins	12	4	0	.750	5–3	9–3	368	296	W1
Dallas Cowboys	7	9	0	.438	5–3	6–6	346	337	L5
Philadelphia Eagles	5	10	1	.344	1–6–1	3–8–1	256	312	L1
St. Louis Cardinals	4	11	1	.281	1–6–1	3–10–1	218	351	W1

== Playoffs ==
=== Schedule ===
Round	Date	Opponent (seed)	Result	Venue	Attendance	Game recap
Wild Card	December 28	Los Angeles Rams (5)	W 19–7	RFK Stadium	54,180	Recap
Divisional	January 3, 1987	at Chicago Bears (2)	W 27–13	Soldier Field	65,141	Recap
NFC Championship	January 11, 1987	at New York Giants (1)	L 0–17	Giants Stadium	76,633	Recap

=== NFC Wild Card Game ===
Washington Redskins 19, Los Angeles Rams 7

Quarter	1	2	3	4	Total
Rams	0	0	0	7	7
Redskins	10	3	3	3	19

at RFK Stadium, Washington, D.C.

- Game time: 4:00 p.m. EST
- Game attendance: 54,180
- Referee: Gordon McCarter
- TV announcers (CBS): Pat Summerall and John Madden

=== NFC Divisional Playoff ===
Washington Redskins 27, Chicago Bears 13

Quarter	1	2	3	4	Total
Redskins	7	0	7	13	27
Bears	0	13	0	0	13

at Soldier Field, Chicago

- Game time: 4:00 p.m. EST/3:00 p.m. CST
- Game attendance: 65,141
- Referee: Bob McElwee
- TV announcers (CBS): Dick Stockton and Dan Dierdorf

In knocking off the defending Super Bowl champion Bears, the Redskins scored their first road playoff win under Joe Gibbs. It would not be the Gibbs-led Redskins' last road playoff win, though, as they scored wins in 1987 at Chicago, in 1990 at Philadelphia, in 1992 at Minnesota, and in 2005 at Tampa.

=== NFC Championship Game ===
New York Giants 17, Washington Redskins 0

Quarter	1	2	3	4	Total
Redskins	0	0	0	0	0
Giants	10	7	0	0	17

at Giants Stadium, East Rutherford, New Jersey

- Game time: 4:00 p.m. EST
- Game attendance: 76,633
- Referee: Pat Haggerty
- TV announcers (CBS): Pat Summerall and John Madden
