= Timothy Morrison =

Tim Morrison or Timothy Morrison may refer to:

- Tim Morrison (American football) (born 1963), American professional football player
- Tim Morrison (presidential advisor) (born c. 1978), American political adviser
