= Gary Clark (American football) =

American football player (born 1962)

- Clark in 2026

No. 84
- Position: Wide receiver

Personal information
- Born: May 1, 1962 (age 64); Radford, Virginia, U.S.
- Listed height: 5 ft 9 in (1.75 m)
- Listed weight: 175 lb (79 kg)

Career information
- High school: Pulaski County (Dublin, Virginia)
- College: James Madison (1980–1983)
- Supplemental draft: 1984: 2nd round, 55th overall pick

Career history
- Jacksonville Bulls (1984–1985); Washington Redskins (1985–1992); Phoenix / Arizona Cardinals (1993–1994); Miami Dolphins (1995)

Awards and highlights
- 2× Super Bowl champion (XXII, XXVI); First-team All-Pro (1987); 2× Second-team All-Pro (1986, 1991); 4× Pro Bowl (1986, 1987, 1990, 1991); James Madison Dukes No. 80 retired; 80 Greatest Redskins; Washington Commanders Ring of Fame

Career NFL statistics
- Games played: 167
- Receptions: 699
- Receiving yards: 10,856
- Receiving average: 15.5
- Receiving touchdowns: 65
- Stats at Pro Football Reference

Gary C. Clark (born May 1, 1962) is an American former professional football player who was a wide receiver in the National Football League (NFL) for the Washington Redskins (1985–92), Phoenix/Arizona Cardinals (1993–94), and Miami Dolphins (1995).

== Early life ==
Clark attended and played high school football for the Cougars football team at Pulaski County High School in Dublin, Virginia.

== College career ==
Clark played college football at James Madison University in Harrisonburg, Virginia, where he caught 155 passes for 2,863 yards and 16 touchdowns. He also had three punt returns for touchdowns, including 89- and 87-yard returns in a game during the 1983 season against the University of Virginia. Clark was at James Madison during the Dukes' first four Division I-AA seasons. He caught 46 passes for James Madison's 8–3 team in 1982 and had 57 receptions in 1983. He was the Virginia offensive player of the year in 1982 and an honorable mention All-American in 1982 and 1983.

Clark became the first person in James Madison history to have his jersey retired.

== Professional career ==
=== USFL ===
Clark was selected by the Jacksonville Bulls sixth overall in the 1984 USFL draft. He led Jacksonville in receiving in his rookie season, in both receptions (56) and receiving yardage (760 yards). He played for the Bulls in 1984 and 1985.

=== NFL ===
Clark was selected by the Washington Redskins in the second round of the 1984 NFL supplemental draft of USFL and CFL players.

In 1985, he signed with the Redskins and had a superb rookie season, recording 72 receptions for 926 yards and five touchdowns. Clark quickly established himself as one of the top receivers in the NFL. He followed up his superb rookie season in 1986 with a Pro Bowl year catching 74 passes for 1,265 yards and seven touchdowns. Clark set a Redskin record for receiving yards in a game during a Monday Night Football contest with the New York Giants. He caught 11 passes for 241 yards and a touchdown. The record still stands today as the "most receiving yards in a non-strike game" (Anthony Allen surpassed Clark's tally during the 1987 strike season). The Redskins went on to finish with a 12–4 record and defeated the reigning Super Bowl champion Chicago Bears, 27–13, in a divisional playoff game but lost to the Giants in the NFC Championship game, 17–0.

In 1987, Clark again had a Pro Bowl year, catching 56 passes for 1,066 and seven touchdowns. He achieved these numbers in only 12 games, as a player strike shortened the season by one game and replacements played three games. No Redskin player crossed the picket line and the replacements went 3–0. Clark was only one of four NFL receivers to surpass 1,000 yards. By this time, he had caught the eye of CBS commentator John Madden. Clark's toughness, big-play ability and willingness to block made him a regular on the All Madden Team during his playing career. The Redskins went on to finish 11–4, winning the NFC East crown. In the playoffs, the Redskins defeated the Chicago Bears in the Divisional Playoff game for the second year in a row, 21–17. Clark caught three passes for 57 yards and a touchdown in the NFC Championship game against the Minnesota Vikings. The Redskins won, 17–10, to earn the right to play in Super Bowl XXII. Clark caught three passes for 55 yards and a touchdown, while also rushing for 25 yards in Washington's 42–10 rout of John Elway and the Denver Broncos in Super Bowl XXII.

Clark's numbers dropped in 1988 as he caught 59 passes for 892 yards and seven touchdowns. The Redskins finished a paltry 7–9 and missed the playoffs. He returned to form in 1989, catching 79 passes (a career-high) for 1,229 yards and nine touchdowns. The Redskins finished 10–6 but missed the playoffs again because of a 5–6 start. Clark, along with fellow receivers Art Monk and Ricky Sanders, surpassed the 1,000 yard mark in 1989. This was the second time in NFL History that three receivers from one team all went over the 1,000 yard mark in the same year.

In 1990, Clark had another Pro Bowl year and the Redskins made the playoffs. He caught 75 passes for 1,112 yards and eight touchdowns. The Redskins went on to beat the Philadelphia Eagles, 20–6, in an NFC Wild Card game. Clark caught four passes for 63 yards and a touchdown. The Redskins lost the next week to the San Francisco 49ers, 28–10.

In 1991, Clark and the Redskins tore through the NFL. He caught 70 passes for 1,340 yards and ten touchdowns. His 19.1 yards per catch was second in the NFL. Clark caught four passes for 203 yards and three touchdowns in Washington's 56–17 rout of the Atlanta Falcons in week 11. The Redskins finished 14–2, won the NFC East, and claimed home field advantage throughout the playoffs. Washington beat Atlanta, 24–7, and crushed Detroit, 41–10, to earn a berth in Super Bowl XXVI against the Buffalo Bills. Clark had a big day with seven catches for 114 yards and a touchdown in Washington's 37–24 defeat of the Bills. The Redskins led 24–0 early in the third quarter, but Buffalo cut the lead to 24–10. His 30-yard touchdown reception in the third quarter was instrumental in thwarting a comeback attempt by the Bills.

Clark, Monk, and Sanders gave the Redskins one of the best receiving corps in the NFL during the late 1980s and early 1990s. They were known as The Posse. Clark was long known as the most fiery spirit of the bunch, and he was known to run laps around RFK Stadium after touchdowns and during Redskins comebacks. Clark signed with the Phoenix Cardinals as a free agent prior to the 1993 season, and the Redskins have only made the playoffs five times since, as of the end of the 2020 season.

Clark retired from the NFL after the 1995 season. In his 11 NFL seasons, he caught 699 passes for 10,856 yards and 65 touchdowns, while rushing for 54 yards and gaining 62 yards on nine punt returns. He also had twenty-seven 100-yard games wearing the Redskins uniform. Clark was a four-time Pro Bowl selection in 1986, 1987, 1990, and 1991. He was also a three-time All-Pro selection. He led his team in receiving seven times (1986, 1987, 1989–1992, 1994), and won two Super Bowls, Super Bowl XXII and Super Bowl XXVI, during his NFL career.

Clark was the first wide receiver in NFL history to catch at least 50 passes in his first ten NFL seasons. As of 2026, the only other players to do so have been Marvin Harrison, Torry Holt, and Larry Fitzgerald. Despite this, Clark was never considered as a finalist for the Pro Football Hall of Fame, much less even make it as a semifinalist despite being one of few receivers to record 10,000 receiving yards in the pre-salary cap era of the NFL while recording 65 touchdown receptions as one of the key receivers on the Redskins along with Art Monk.

== NFL career statistics ==
Legend
**Bold**	Career high

=== Regular season ===
Year	Team	Games		Receiving				
Year	Team	GP	GS	Rec	Yds	Avg	Lng	TD
1985	WAS	16	10	72	926	12.9	55	5
1986	WAS	15	15	74	1,265	17.1	55	7
1987	WAS	12	11	56	1,066	19.0	**84**	7
1988	WAS	16	13	59	892	15.1	60	7
1989	WAS	15	12	**79**	1,229	15.6	80	9
1990	WAS	16	16	75	1,112	14.8	53	8
1991	WAS	16	16	70	**1,340**	**19.1**	82	**10**
1992	WAS	16	14	64	912	14.3	47	5
1993	PHX	14	10	63	818	13.0	55	4
1994	ARI	15	2	50	771	15.4	45	1
1995	MIA	16	0	37	525	14.2	42	2
Career		167	119	699	10,856	15.5	84	65

== Personal life ==
Clark was the owner of the now closed South Beach Restaurant and Martini Lounge in Bethesda, Maryland.

He was inducted into the Redskins Ring of Honor on October 7, 2007, and concluded his speech with, "We are going to spank Detroit's butt." The Redskins won the game, 34–3.

In 2007, he was inducted into the Virginia Sports Hall of Fame.
