= Ed Rubbert =

American football player (born 1965)

No. 16
- Position: Quarterback

Personal information
- Born: May 28, 1965 (age 61); Suffern, New York, U.S.
- Listed height: 6 ft 5 in (1.96 m)
- Listed weight: 225 lb (102 kg)

Career information
- High school: Clarkstown North (New City, New York)
- College: Louisville
- NFL draft: 1987: undrafted

Career history
- Washington Redskins (1987); San Diego Chargers (1988)*; Miami Dolphins (1989)*; Albany Firebirds (1991–1993)
- * Offseason or practice squad member only

Awards and highlights
- Second Team All-South Independent (1984)

Career NFL statistics
- Passing attempts: 49
- Passing completions: 26
- Completion percentage: 53.1%
- Passing yards: 532
- TD–INT: 4–1
- Passer rating: 110.2
- Stats at Pro Football Reference

Career AFL statistics
- Completions / Attempts: 42 / 96
- Percentage: 43.8
- Passing yards: 542
- TD–INT: 4–7
- Passer rating: 42.10
- Stats at ArenaFan.com

Edward Rubbert (born May 28, 1965) is an American former professional football player who was a quarterback in the National Football League (NFL) for the Washington Redskins as a member of the Redskins' replacement team during the 1987 NFL players' strike. He played college football for the Louisville Cardinals.

== Early life ==
Rubbert attended Clarkstown North High School. He accepted a football scholarship from the University of Louisville.

== Professional career ==
In September 1987, he signed to be part of the Washington Redskins replacement team. He completed the longest pass from scrimmage in the 1987 NFL season, an 88-yard touchdown to Anthony Allen on October 4, and led the Redskins to two consecutive wins on their way to a Super Bowl XXII championship.

Rubbert also started a third game only to be injured in the first quarter; the Redskins eventually won that game behind backup replacement quarterback Tony Robinson. The following week the Redskins' regular players returned to the field following the end of the strike and Rubbert finished with 26-of-49 (53.1%) completions for 532 yards, 4 touchdowns, one interception and an undefeated record (3–0).

Rubbert also played for the Albany Firebirds in the Arena Football League (AFL) for three years (1991 to 1993) where he completed 42 of 96 passes for 532 yards and four touchdowns and seven interceptions.

== Personal life ==
Rubbert is now a coach for Mainland Regional High School located in Linwood, New Jersey. The high school contains kids from Linwood, Somers Point, and Northfield.

Additionally, Rubbert was the inspiration for Keanu Reeves' character in the football movie The Replacements.
