= Mike Mitchell (cornerback) =

American football player (born 1961)

No. 46
- Position: Cornerback

Personal information
- Born: October 18, 1961 (age 65); Waco, Texas
- Listed height: 5 ft 11 in (1.80 m)
- Listed weight: 180 lb (82 kg)

Career information
- High school: Richfield
- College: Howard Payne

Career history
- Houston Oilers (1983)*; Houston Gamblers (1984-1985); Washington Redskins (1987); New York Jets (1988–1989); Ottawa Rough Riders (1990)
- * Offseason or practice squad member only
- Stats at Pro Football Reference

Michael George Mitchell (born October 18, 1961) is an American former football cornerback in the National Football League for the Washington Redskins and the New York Jets. He played college football at Howard Payne University.
