= Timmy Smith =

American football player (born 1964)

No. 36, 33
- Position: Running back

Personal information
- Born: January 21, 1964 (age 62); Hobbs, New Mexico, U.S.
- Listed height: 5 ft 11 in (1.80 m)
- Listed weight: 216 lb (98 kg)

Career information
- High school: Hobbs (NM)
- College: Texas Tech
- NFL draft: 1987: 5th round, 117th overall pick

Career history
- Washington Redskins (1987–1988); San Diego Chargers (1989)*; Dallas Cowboys (1990); Baltimore Stallions (1994)*
- * Offseason or practice squad member only

Awards and highlights
- Super Bowl champion (XXII); NFL record: Most rushing yards in a Super Bowl: 204

Career NFL statistics
- Rushing yards: 602
- Rushing average: 3.2
- Rushing touchdowns: 3
- Stats at Pro Football Reference

Timothy LaRay Smith (born January 21, 1964) is an American former professional football player who was a running back in the National Football League (NFL) for the Washington Redskins and the Dallas Cowboys. He played college football for the Texas Tech Red Raiders. Smith rose to fame after setting a rushing record in Super Bowl XXII.

== Early life ==
Smith attended Hobbs High School, where he played football and basketball. He graduated with the state of New Mexico record for rushing yards (2,306 yards) and rushing touchdowns (31).

He accepted a scholarship from Texas Tech University. As a sophomore, he led the Red Raiders in rushing with 164 carries for 711 yards. The next season, he rushed for 97 yards on 7 carries and 2 touchdowns in the season opener against the University of New Mexico, until he was hit after scoring his second touchdown, which resulted in a knee injury that kept him out of action for most of the year, finishing with 26 carries for 140 yards and 3 touchdowns.

As a fifth year senior, he suffered a fractured foot and ankle during an early-season practice, that sidelined him again for most of the season, posting 7 carries for 19 yards. He finished his college career after appearing in 28 games, with 292 carries for 1,313 yards and 8 touchdowns.

== Professional career ==
Pre-draft measurables
Height	Weight	Arm length	Hand span	Bench press
5 ft 10 5/8 in (1.79 m)	216 lb (98 kg)	27 3/4 in (0.70 m)	9 in (0.23 m)	10 reps

=== Washington Redskins ===
Smith was selected by the Washington Redskins in the fifth round (117th overall) of the 1987 NFL draft, because of his combination of size and athletic ability. During his first season, although starter George Rogers was limited with different injuries, Smith had only carried the ball in four games.

In the Divisional playoff game against the Chicago Bears, Rogers wasn't playing well, so after he had only six carries for 13 yards, combined with an ineffective performance by his backup Kelvin Bryant, Smith was inserted into the game and responded with 66 yards on 16 carries, including seven carries to run out the clock. In the NFC Championship game against the Minnesota Vikings he had 72 rushing yards on 13 carries, contributing to a narrow 17–10 win.

After his playoff performances, head coach Joe Gibbs made the decision to start Smith in the Super Bowl, but only told this to starting quarterback Doug Williams and a few of his assistant coaches, in order to avoid rookie Smith being overwhelmed by the pressure. Smith was told about this decision before the pregame warmups.

In Super Bowl XXII, Smith set a Super Bowl rushing record in his first career start, gaining 204 yards and scoring two touchdowns. His efforts helped lead the Redskins to a 42–10 victory over the Denver Broncos. It was his only significant achievement as an NFL player, even receiving recognition from the NFL Films as the #2 one-shot wonder in league history.

In 1988, he didn't participate in offseason workouts and training camp, while his agent told Washington that Smith deserved a new contract that would have made him the highest-paid running back in the league. The team told Smith they would not give him a new deal, and he eventually reported to camp. But Smith was 25 pounds overweight when he did return to the team, and he had an up and down season, losing his starting position after the eighth game and not having a single carry for Washington's final 4 games of the season. Smith finished 1988 with 155 carries for 470 yards and 3 touchdowns.

In 1989, he was no longer seen as a good fit and was left unprotected—eligible to sign with any team under Plan B free agency.

=== San Diego Chargers ===
In the 1989 offseason, Smith turned down a $100,000 offer from the Miami Dolphins, failed a physical with the Phoenix Cardinals and eventually signed with the San Diego Chargers for $250,000 on April 1. Smith suffered a severe left ankle sprain in training camp and was seen with a suspected drug dealer, leading to his release on September 5.

=== Dallas Cowboys ===
In May 1990, he was signed after having a tryout with the Dallas Cowboys. In that offseason, the Cowboys also acquired running backs Terrence Flagler from a trade and future Pro Football Hall of Famer Emmitt Smith in the 1990 NFL draft. Because of the competition at the position, the Cowboys also tried him at fullback. On September 4, he was cut the same day the Cowboys traded for running back Alonzo Highsmith. He was brought back to play in the season opener, but was released on September 11, after rushing for only 6 yards on 6 carries.

=== Baltimore Stallions ===
In 1994, Smith was signed by the Baltimore Stallions of the Canadian Football League, but was released before the start of the season.

== Personal life ==
In 2005, he was arrested for allegedly trying to sell cocaine to an undercover police officer in Denver. Smith pleaded guilty in March 2006 for conspiring to distribute cocaine, and was sentenced to two and a half years in federal prison that May. Smith was released from federal prison on March 3, 2008.
