= Darrick Brilz =

American football player (born 1964)

No. 75, 73, 64, 65
- Positions: Guard, center

Personal information
- Born: February 14, 1964 (age 62); Richmond, California, U.S.
- Listed height: 6 ft 4 in (1.93 m)
- Listed weight: 281 lb (127 kg)

Career information
- High school: Pinole Valley
- College: Oregon State
- NFL draft: 1987: undrafted

Career history
- Washington Redskins (1987); San Diego Chargers (1988); Seattle Seahawks (1989–1993); Cincinnati Bengals (1994–1998)

Awards and highlights
- Super Bowl champion (XXII)

Career NFL statistics
- Games played: 175
- Games started: 124
- Fumble recoveries: 3
- Stats at Pro Football Reference

Darrick Joseph Brilz (born February 14, 1964) is an American former professional football player who was an offensive lineman in the National Football League (NFL) for the Washington Redskins, San Diego Chargers, Seattle Seahawks, and Cincinnati Bengals. He played college football for the Oregon State Beavers.
