= Keiron Bigby =

American football player (born 1966)

No. 84
- Position: Wide receiver

Personal information
- Born: February 27, 1966 (age 60); Brooklyn, New York, U.S.
- Listed height: 5 ft 10 in (1.78 m)
- Listed weight: 177 lb (80 kg)

Career information
- High school: St. Anthony's (NY)
- College: Brown
- NFL draft: 1987: undrafted

Career history
- Washington Redskins (1987)

Career NFL statistics
- Games played: 1
- Games started: 0
- Stats at Pro Football Reference

Keiron Bigby (born February 27, 1966) is an American former professional football player who was a wide receiver for the Washington Redskins of the National Football League (NFL) in 1987. He played college football for the Brown Bears.

In 2018, Bigby was awarded a Super Bowl ring for playing for the Redskins in 1987, the year they won Super Bowl XXII.
