= Dave Truitt =

American football player (born 1964)

No. 85
- Position: Tight end

Personal information
- Born: February 18, 1964 (age 62); New Brunswick, New Jersey, U.S.
- Listed height: 6 ft 4 in (1.93 m)
- Listed weight: 232 lb (105 kg)

Career information
- High school: Gaithersburg
- College: North Carolina
- NFL draft: 1987: undrafted

Career history
- Washington Redskins (1987)
- Stats at Pro Football Reference

David Moreland Truitt (born February 18, 1964) is an American former professional American football player who was a tight end in the National Football League (NFL). He played for the Washington Redskins during the 1987 season, having previously competed at the collegiate level for the University of North Carolina.

After retiring from football, Truitt pursued a career in business and technology. He served as president of Microlink and is currently the chief executive officer of Discover Technologies, LLC.
