= Kelvin Bryant =

American football player (born 1960)

No. 44, 24
- Position: Running back

Personal information
- Born: September 26, 1960 (age 66); Tarboro, North Carolina, U.S.
- Listed height: 6 ft 2 in (1.88 m)
- Listed weight: 195 lb (88 kg)

Career information
- High school: Tarboro
- College: North Carolina
- NFL draft: 1983: 7th round, 196th overall pick

Career history
- Philadelphia Stars (1983–1984); Baltimore Stars (1985); Washington Redskins (1986–1990)

Awards and highlights
- Super Bowl champion (XXII); 2× USFL champion (1984, 1985); USFL Most Valuable Player (1983); 2× All-USFL (1983, 1984); USFL All-Time Team; 2× First-team All-ACC (1980, 1981); North Carolina Tar Heels Jersey No. 44 honored

Career NFL statistics
- Rushing yards: 1,186
- Rushing average: 4.6
- Receptions: 154
- Receiving yards: 1,634
- Total touchdowns: 20
- Stats at Pro Football Reference

Kelvin Leroy Bryant (born September 26, 1960) is an American former professional football player who was a running back in the National Football League (NFL) and the United States Football League (USFL). He played college football for the North Carolina Tar Heels

== Early life ==
Bryant played two years of varsity football at Tarboro High School in Tarboro, North Carolina. In the 10th grade as a player on the Junior Varsity team he was invited to move up to varsity but endeared himself to his team by choosing to remain with the Junior Varsity squad. His 10th grade team was 8–1, his 11th grade (varsity team) was 6–4 and as a senior the Tarboro Vikings were 10–0 in the regular season claiming the conference championship and ranked number 1 in the state in the 3A classification. A first round playoff defeat ended dreams of a state championship.

== College career ==
Bryant played college football at the University of North Carolina at Chapel Hill, where he was a three-time first-team All-ACC tailback. When he left UNC in 1982 he had 3,267 rushing yards in his career. This was, at the time, the third highest career rushing yard total ever for the Tar Heels (fifth most ever as of March 2021). He had three consecutive 1,000-yard rushing seasons from 1980 to 1982. Despite injuries in 1981, he still rushed for 1,015 yards in just seven games. He rushed for more than 100 yards in a game on 19 occasions. In one of the most memorable games in UNC football history, Bryant scored six touchdowns against East Carolina University in 1981. He holds the NCAA record for most touchdowns scored in two and three consecutive games (11 and 15, respectively). He was named one of the ACC's Top 50 players of all time in 2002.

- 1980: 177 carries for 1,039 yards with 11 TD. 12 catches for 194 yards with 1 TD.
- 1981: 152 carries for 1,077 yards with 17 TD. 8 catches for 60 yards with 1 TD.
- 1982: 228 carries for 1,064 yards with 3 TD. 24 catches for 249 yards with 4 TD.

== Professional career ==
Bryant was drafted in the first round by the Philadelphia Stars of the United States Football League in 1983. He rushed for 1,440 yards on 317 carries with 16 touchdowns in his rookie season and was named league MVP and an USFL All-Star. He played in the Championship Game that year but the Stars lost to the Michigan Panthers, 24–22.

In 1984, Bryant rushed for 1,406 yards on 301 carries and ran for 13 touchdowns and was again named to the USFL All-Star team. That season, the Stars won the Championship Game with Bryant as the starting running back.

In 1985, Bryant rushed for 1,207 yards on 238 carries with 12 touchdowns. The Stars had become the Baltimore Stars that season and they again won the Championship Game. He left the USFL the second leading running back in their history.

Bryant was then signed by the Washington Redskins of the National Football League. They had originally drafted him in the seventh round of the 1983 NFL Draft. He was a reserve for the Redskins in 1986 and 1987, but he showed flashes of his USFL greatness and became the starting running back in 1988. He had rushed for 498 yards on 108 carries when he suffered an injury which ended his season. He was out in 1989 due to the injury and came back briefly in 1990 before retiring. Bryant scored 14 touchdowns on 154 catches in his NFL career. He was a part of the Redskins' Super Bowl XXII winning team.

== NFL career statistics ==
Legend
	Won the Super Bowl
**Bold**	Career high

=== Regular season ===
Year	Team	Games		Rushing					Receiving				
Year	Team	GP	GS	Att	Yds	Avg	Lng	TD	Rec	Yds	Avg	Lng	TD
1986	WAS	10	0	69	258	3.7	22	**4**	**43**	449	10.4	40	3
1987	WAS	11	1	77	406	**5.3**	**28**	1	**43**	**490**	**11.4**	39	**5**
1988	WAS	10	**4**	**108**	**498**	4.6	25	1	42	447	10.6	**47**	**5**
1990	WAS	**15**	0	6	24	4.0	12	0	26	248	9.5	37	1
		46	5	260	1,186	4.6	28	6	154	1,634	10.6	47	14

=== Playoffs ===
Year	Team	Games		Rushing					Receiving				
Year	Team	GP	GS	Att	Yds	Avg	Lng	TD	Rec	Yds	Avg	Lng	TD
1986	WAS	**3**	0	**18**	**88**	**4.9**	12	0	**13**	**124**	9.5	24	**1**
1987	WAS	**3**	0	14	49	3.5	**15**	0	5	67	**13.4**	**42**	**1**
		6	0	32	137	4.3	15	0	18	191	10.6	42	2

== USFL career statistics ==
Legend
Won USFL Championship

Year	Team	Games		Rushing					Receiving				
Year	Team	GP	GS	Att	Yds	Avg	Lng	TD	Rec	Yds	Avg	Lng	TD
1983	Philadelphia/Baltimore Stars	17	17	318	1,442	4.5	45	16	53	410	7.7	50	1
1984	Philadelphia/Baltimore Stars	15	14	297	1,406	4.7	35	13	48	453	9.4	39	1
1985	Philadelphia/Baltimore Stars	15		238	1,207	5.1	82	12	40	407	10.2	43	4
		47	31	853	4,055	4.8	82	41	141	1,270	9.0	50	6

== Honors ==
- High School All American
- Named one of the ACC's Top 50 players of all time in 2002
- North Carolina Sports Hall Of Fame Inductee - class of 2013

== USFL stats ==
- Carries - 855
- Yards - 4,053
- Touchdowns - 41
- Yards Per Carry - 4.7
