= Mark Carlson (offensive tackle) =

American football player (born 1963)

No. 79
- Position: Offensive tackle

Personal information
- Born: June 6, 1963 (age 63); Milford, Connecticut, U.S.
- Listed height: 6 ft 6 in (1.98 m)
- Listed weight: 284 lb (129 kg)

Career information
- High school: the morgan school
- College: Southern Connecticut State
- NFL draft: 1987: undrafted

Career history
- Washington Redskins (1987); Atlanta Falcons (1989)*
- * Offseason or practice squad member only

Awards and highlights
- Super Bowl champion (XXII)

Career NFL statistics
- Games played: 3
- Games started: 3
- Stats at Pro Football Reference

Mark Carlson (born June 6, 1963) is an American former professional football player who was an offensive tackle in the National Football League (NFL) for the Washington Redskins during the 1987 NFL season. He played college football for the Southern Connecticut State Owls. He is an offensive line coach at Cuthbertson High School.

He and his wife have three daughters and they are based in North Carolina. In 2018, Carlson was awarded a Super Bowl ring for playing for the Redskins in 1987, the year they won Super Bowl XXII.
