= Brendan Toibin =

American football player (1964–2013)

No. 8
- Position: Kicker

Personal information
- Born: February 2, 1964; Columbia, South Carolina
- Died: February 12, 2013 (aged 49)
- Listed height: 6 ft 0 in (1.83 m)
- Listed weight: 205 lb (93 kg)

Career information
- College: Richmond
- NFL draft: 1986: undrafted

Career history
- Washington Redskins (1987)

Career NFL statistics
- Field goals attempted: 2
- Field goals made: 0
- Extra points attempted: 4
- Extra points made: 4
- Stats at Pro Football Reference

Brendan Patrick Toibin (February 2, 1964 – February 12, 2013) was an American football placekicker in the National Football League. He played one game for the Washington Redskins in 1987. He played high school football at Monacan High School in Richmond, Virginia and college football at the University of Richmond.
