= Eric Yarber =

American football player and coach (born 1963)

Los Angeles Rams
- Title: Senior offensive assistant/wide receivers

Personal information
- Born: September 22, 1963 (age 63); Chicago, Illinois, U.S.
- Listed height: 5 ft 8 in (1.73 m)
- Listed weight: 156 lb (71 kg)

Career information
- Position: Wide receiver (No. 80)
- High school: Crenshaw (Los Angeles, California)
- College: Idaho
- NFL draft: 1986: 12th round, 323rd overall pick

Career history

Playing
- Washington Redskins (1986–1987); San Diego Chargers (1989–1990)*
- * Offseason or practice squad member only

Coaching
- Idaho (1996) Defensive backs; UNLV (1997) Wide receivers; Seattle Seahawks (1998) Offensive quality control; Oregon State (1999) Running backs; Oregon State (2000–2002) Wide receivers; San Francisco 49ers (2003–2004) Wide receivers; Washington (2005–2006) Wide receivers; Arizona State (2007–2009) Wide receivers; Tampa Bay Buccaneers (2010–2011) Wide receivers; UCLA (2012–2016) Wide receivers; Los Angeles Rams (2017–2025) Wide receivers; Los Angeles Rams (2026-present) Senior offensive assistant/wide receivers

Awards and highlights
- As player: Super Bowl champion (XXII); Big Sky MVP (1985); As coach: Super Bowl champion (LVI)

Career NFL statistics
- Receptions: 1
- Receiving yards: 5
- Return yards: 416
- Stats at Pro Football Reference

Eric Lamone Yarber (born September 22, 1963) is an American football coach and former college player who is currently the wide receivers coach for the Los Angeles Rams of the National Football League (NFL). He played two seasons in the NFL as a wide receiver for the Washington Redskins in 1986 and 1987, which included a win in Super Bowl XXII.

== Early life & playing career ==
Born in Chicago, Illinois, Yarber grew up in Southern California in South Los Angeles, and graduated from Crenshaw High School. Though he did not play varsity football in high school due to his size, he played junior college football at Los Angeles Valley College. He transferred to Idaho of the Big Sky Conference in 1984 to play for third-year head coach Dennis Erickson. As a senior, Yarber was the conference MVP in 1985, and the Vandals won their first league title since 1971. Yarber led the Big Sky Conference in receiving with over 1,100 yards and 10 touchdowns during the 11-game regular season. Teammates on the Vandals included quarterback Scott Linehan and offensive lineman Tom Cable, both future NFL head coaches, and lineman Mark Schlereth.

Yarber was selected in the twelfth round (323rd overall) of the 1986 NFL draft by the Washington Redskins and was with the club for two seasons. In 1987, Yarber played in 12 regular season games, and had one career reception for five yards and was the team's primary punt returner as the Redskins went on to become Super Bowl champions.

== Coaching career ==
Yarber began his coaching career back at Idaho in 1996 as a secondary defensive back coach under second-year head coach Chris Tormey. He was the wide receivers coach at UNLV in 1997. The next year, head coach Dennis Erickson hired Yarber to be the offensive quality control coach of the Seattle Seahawks in the NFL, and coached under Erickson from 1998–2004 and 2007–2009.

From 1999–2002, Yarber was on Erickson's staff at Oregon State in the Pac-10 Conference. In 1999, he was the running backs coach, and the next year he became the wide receivers coach. He coached Chad Johnson and T. J. Houshmandzadeh during their time with the Beavers. He followed Erickson back to the pros with the San Francisco 49ers, as the receivers coach in 2003 and 2004. Following Erickson's dismissal, Yarber was the receivers coach for the Washington Huskies for two seasons under head coach Tyrone Willingham. In 2007, Yarber reunited with Erickson at Arizona State and was the Sun Devils' wide receivers coach through 2009.

In 2010, Yarber returned to the NFL for two seasons as the wide receivers coach for the Tampa Bay Buccaneers. Following a 4–12 record in 2011, Raheem Morris and his staff were fired on January 2, 2012. A week later on January 9, Yarber was named the wide receivers coach for UCLA under then-new head coach Jim Mora. He went back to the NFL in 2017, hired by new head coach Sean McVay as the wide receivers coach for the Los Angeles Rams. During his time with Los Angeles, Yarber has coached top receivers including Robert Woods, Sammy Watkins, Cooper Kupp, Odell Beckham Jr., Allen Robinson, Puka Nacua, and Davante Adams. Yarber won his first world championship as coach and second overall after the Rams defeated the Cincinnati Bengals in Super Bowl LVI. After nine seasons as wide receivers coach, Yarber was redesignated as senior offensive assistant/wide receivers heading into the 2026 season.

== Personal life ==
Yarber received his bachelor's degree from the University of Idaho in 1995. He was married in June 2005 to his wife Michele and they have one son Kameryon.
