= Jess Atkinson =

American football player (born 1961)

No. 10, 12, 4, 14
- Position: Placekicker

Personal information
- Born: December 11, 1961 (age 64); Ann Arbor, Michigan, U.S.
- Listed height: 5 ft 9 in (1.75 m)
- Listed weight: 165 lb (75 kg)

Career information
- High school: Crossland
- College: Maryland
- NFL draft: 1985: undrafted

Career history
- St. Louis Cardinals (1985); New York Giants (1985); Washington Redskins (1986–1987); Indianapolis Colts (1988)

Awards and highlights
- Super Bowl champion (XXII); 2× First-team All-ACC (1982, 1983)
- Stats at Pro Football Reference

Jess Gerald Atkinson (born December 11, 1961) is an American former professional football player who was a placekicker in the National Football League (NFL) for the St. Louis Cardinals, New York Giants, Washington Redskins, and the Indianapolis Colts. He played college football for the Maryland Terrapins.

Since his departure from WUSA, he has gone into different ventures, many of which keep him closely associated with his alma mater. His most recent venture is the production of the television series Terrapins Rising, which is a reality show about the Terrapins' football team that airs on Comcast Sportsnet.
