= Eric Coyle =

American football player (born 1963)

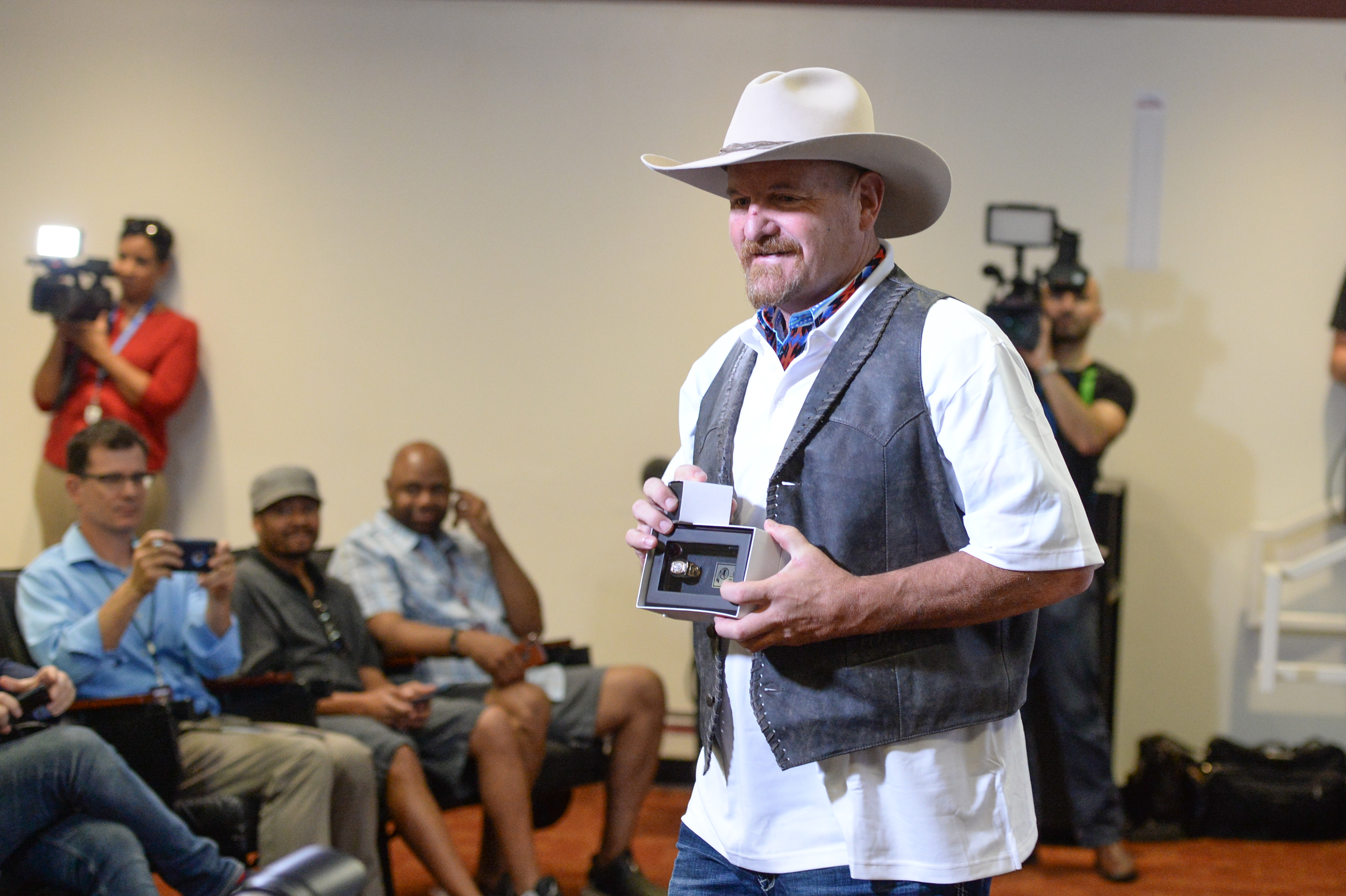
- Coyle after receiving his Super Bowl ring at a ceremony held in 2018

No. 56
- Position: Center

Personal information
- Born: October 26, 1963 (age 63); Longmont, Colorado, U.S.
- Listed height: 6 ft 3 in (1.91 m)
- Listed weight: 260 lb (118 kg)

Career information
- High school: Longmont
- College: Colorado
- NFL draft: 1987: undrafted

Career history
- Washington Redskins (1987–1988); Dallas Cowboys (1989)*; Denver Broncos (1990)*
- * Offseason or practice squad member only

Awards and highlights
- Third-team All-American (1986); First-team All-Big Eight (1986); Second-team All-Big Eight (1985)

Career NFL statistics
- Games played: 3
- Games started: 3
- Stats at Pro Football Reference

Eric H. Coyle (born October 26, 1963) is an American former professional football player who was a center in the National Football League (NFL).

Coyle was born and raised in Longmont, Colorado and played scholastically at Longmont High School. He played college football at Colorado, where he was honored by the Associated Press as a third-team All-American.

After going undrafted, Coyle signed with the Washington Redskins as a replacement player during the 1987 NFLPA strike. He played three games in 1987, and signed with the team in 1988, but spent the entire season on injured reserve.

In January 2018, 30 years after Super Bowl XXII, the Redskins awarded Super Bowl rings to 26 replacement players, including Coyle.
