= Clarence Vaughn =

American football player (born 1964)

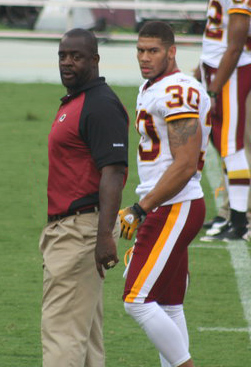
- Vaughn as a coach with the Washington Redskins

No. 31
- Position: Safety

Personal information
- Born: July 17, 1964 (age 62); Chicago, Illinois, U.S.
- Listed height: 6 ft 2 in (1.88 m)
- Listed weight: 202 lb (92 kg)

Career information
- High school: Gage Park (Chicago)
- College: Northern Illinois
- NFL draft: 1987: 8th round, 219th overall pick

Career history
- Washington Redskins (1987–1992)

Awards and highlights
- 2× Super Bowl champion (XXII, XXVI)

Career NFL statistics
- Sacks: 1
- Fumble recoveries: 1
- Stats at Pro Football Reference

Clarence Vaughn (born July 17, 1964) is an American former professional football player who was a safety for the Washington Redskins of the National Football League (NFL). He played college football for the Northern Illinois Huskies.

== Early life ==
In high school, at Gage Park in Chicago, Vaughn played football, basketball and baseball. He was All-State honorable mention and a three-year football letterman starting on both sides of the ball as a running back and a linebacker.

== College career ==
Vaughn played college football at Northern Illinois University where he won his 4-year football scholarship. He played linebacker for the Huskies and led the team in tackles with 92 tackles his senior year. In 1983, he was a linebacker on the California Bowl III championship team where they beat CSUF. Vaughn played under three head coaches at Northern Illinois University, Bill Mallory, Lee Corso and Jerry Pettibone. In 1995, he was inducted into the NIU Hall of Fame for the 1983 football team. He received his B.A. Degree in Criminal Justice and minored in Business Administration.

== Professional career ==
Vaughn was selected in the eighth round (219th overall) of the 1987 NFL draft by the Washington Redskins. In his first NFL start against the St. Louis Cardinals, he had 13 solo tackles. Later that year, in a post-season game against the Minnesota Vikings, Vaughn made a critical play where he sacked Vikings quarterback Wade Wilson. They then went on to win Super Bowl XXII against the Denver Broncos. He won his second Super Bowl in 1992 against the Buffalo Bills, Super Bowl XXVI. Vaughn was the first NIU player to play in a Super Bowl, and is still the only NIU player to win two Super Bowls.

== After football ==
Vaughn currently runs a youth and young adult football training camp called Get NFL Ready and was Assistant Coach at Loudoun Valley High School in 2015. Prior to the 2015 football season, he was the head coach of Liberty High School in Colorado Springs, Colorado. In 2010, Vaughn coached with the Washington Redskins under their internship program. With the Redskins, Vaughn studied the defensive plays, helped manage the sideline reps and helped manage game day performance of the defensive players. Vaughn coached his third season in 2009 at Bluffton University as a defensive assistant under the NFLPA/NCAA program for retired players. In 2007-08, in Colorado, he was an assistant football coach in charge of the middle linebackers for Rampart High School. He was the fourth Super Bowl vet ever to coach high school in Colorado (John Elway with Cherry Creek, Louis Wright with Rangeview and Rick Upchurch with Pueblo East are the other three). Vaughn is married to his wife, Brooke, and resides in Northern Virginia with their kids.
