= Anthony Copeland =

American football player (born 1963)

No. 57
- Position: Linebacker

Personal information
- Born: April 14, 1963 (age 63); Atlanta, Georgia, U.S.
- Listed height: 6 ft 2 in (1.88 m)
- Listed weight: 250 lb (113 kg)

Career information
- High school: Walter F. George
- College: Louisville
- NFL draft: 1986: undrafted

Career history
- Washington Redskins (1986–1987)

Awards and highlights
- Super Bowl champion (XXII)
- Stats at Pro Football Reference

Anthony Lamar Copeland (born April 14, 1963) is an American former professional football linebacker. He played three games in the National Football League (NFL) for the Washington Redskins in 1987. He played college football at Wichita State University and University of Louisville.
