= Rick Kehr =

American football player (born 1959)

No. 74, 61
- Position: Guard

Personal information
- Born: June 18, 1959 (age 67); Phoenixville, Pennsylvania, U.S.
- Listed height: 6 ft 3 in (1.91 m)
- Listed weight: 285 lb (129 kg)

Career information
- High school: Larkin (Elgin, Illinois)
- College: Carthage
- NFL draft: 1981: undrafted

Career history
- Green Bay Packers (1981)*; St. Louis Cardinals (1983)*; Houston Gamblers (1985); Miami Dolphins (1986)*; Washington Redskins (1987–1988)
- * Offseason or practice squad member only

Awards and highlights
- Super Bowl champion (XXII)

Career NFL statistics
- Games played: 5
- Stats at Pro Football Reference

Karl Richard Kehr (born June 18, 1959) is an American former professional football player who was a guard in the National Football League (NFL) for the Washington Redskins. He played college football for the Carthage Red Men.
