= Dan McQuaid =

American football player (born 1960)

No. 60
- Position: Tackle

Personal information
- Born: October 4, 1960 (age 66); Courtland, California, U.S.
- Listed height: 6 ft 7 in (2.01 m)
- Listed weight: 278 lb (126 kg)

Career information
- College: UNLV
- NFL draft: 1984: undrafted

Career history
- Los Angeles Rams (1984); Washington Redskins (1985–1987); Minnesota Vikings (1988); Indianapolis Colts (1988)

Awards and highlights
- Super Bowl champion (XXII)
- Stats at Pro Football Reference

Daniel James McQuaid (born October 4, 1960) is an American former professional football player who was an offensive tackle in the National Football League (NFL). He played college football for the UNLV Rebels. McQuaid played in the NFL for the Washington Redskins, Indianapolis Colts, and Minnesota Vikings.
