= Johnny Thomas (cornerback) =

American football player (born 1964)

No. 47, 22, 34, 41, 20
- Position: Defensive back

Personal information
- Born: August 3, 1964 (age 62); Houston, Texas, U.S.
- Listed height: 5 ft 9 in (1.75 m)
- Listed weight: 188 lb (85 kg)

Career information
- High school: Sterling (Houston)
- College: Baylor
- NFL draft: 1987: 7th round, 192nd overall pick

Career history
- Washington Redskins (1987–1988); San Diego Chargers (1989); Kansas City Chiefs (1990)*; Washington Redskins (1990); Frankfurt Galaxy (1992); Washington Redskins (1992–1994); Cleveland Browns (1995); Philadelphia Eagles (1996); San Diego Chargers (1997)
- * Offseason or practice squad member only

Awards and highlights
- Super Bowl champion (XXII)

Career NFL statistics
- Tackles: 19
- Fumble recoveries: 4
- Stats at Pro Football Reference

Johnny Thomas Jr. (born August 3, 1964, or 1963) is an American former professional football player who was a cornerback in the National Football League (NFL) for the Washington Redskins, San Diego Chargers, Cleveland Browns, and Philadelphia Eagles. He played college football for the Baylor Bears and was selected in the seventh round of the 1987 NFL draft. He also ran track and field at Baylor University, winning the NCAA Championship in the 4×400 meters relay in 1985.
