= Dennis Woodberry =

American football player (born 1961)

No. 41, 22, 46, 21
- Position: Cornerback

Personal information
- Born: April 22, 1961 (age 65); Texarkana, Arkansas

Career information
- High school: Arkansas High School
- College: Southern Arkansas
- Supplemental draft: 1984: 3rd round, 63rd overall pick

Career history
- Birmingham Stallions (1984–1985); Atlanta Falcons (1986); Washington Redskins (1987–1988); Denver Broncos (1989)*
- * Offseason or practice squad member only

Career NFL statistics
- Games played: 31
- Interceptions: 2
- Fumble recoveries: 1
- Stats at Pro Football Reference

Dennis Earl Woodberry (born April 22, 1961) is an American former professional football player who was a cornerback in the National Football League for the Atlanta Falcons and the Washington Redskins and in the United States Football League for the Birmingham Stallions. Woodberry played college football at Southern Arkansas University.

== Early life ==
Woodberry was born in Texarkana, Arkansas, and attended Arkansas High School.

== College career ==
Woodberry attended and played college football at Southern Arkansas University. He was the first football player from Southern Arkansas to be drafted into the National Football League.

== Professional career ==
Woodberry began his professional football career in the United States Football League for the Birmingham Stallions, where he played in 1984 and 1985. He was selected in the 1984 NFL supplemental draft of USFL and CFL players by the Atlanta Falcons. He joined the Falcons in the offseason of 1986, and was cut on September 1. However, due to injuries, he was resigned and played the last seven games for the Falcons. He was then traded to the Green Bay Packers for cash in 1987, but never played a game for them. Woodberry was signed in 1987 by the Washington Redskins. The 1987 season began with a 24-day players' strike, reducing the 16-game season to 15. The games for weeks 4–6 were won with all replacement players, including Woodberry. The Redskins have the distinction of being the only team with no players crossing the picket line. Those three victories are often credited with getting the team into the playoffs and the basis for the 2000 movie The Replacements. He was one of the few replacement players that the Redskins retained after the strike ended.
