= Keith Griffin (American football) =

American football player (born 1961)

No. 35, 44
- Position: Running back

Personal information
- Born: October 26, 1961 (age 65); Columbus, Ohio, U.S.
- Listed height: 5 ft 8 in (1.73 m)
- Listed weight: 185 lb (84 kg)

Career information
- High school: Eastmoor Academy (Columbus)
- College: Miami (FL)
- NFL draft: 1984: 10th round, 279th overall pick

Career history
- Washington Redskins (1984–1988); Atlanta Falcons (1988)

Awards and highlights
- Super Bowl champion (XXII); National champion (1983)

Career NFL statistics
- Rushing yards: 1,343
- Rushing average: 4.1
- Rushing touchdowns: 3
- Stats at Pro Football Reference

Keith B. Griffin (born October 26, 1961) is an American former professional football player who was a running back for the Washington Redskins of the National Football League (NFL). He played college football for the Miami Hurricanes. Griffin was featured on the cover of Sports Illustrated on January 9, 1984, for the story of the Hurricanes' dramatic victory over the #1 ranked Nebraska Cornhuskers 31–30 in the January 1, 1984, Orange Bowl. The 11–1–0 Hurricanes broke the Cornhuskers' 22-game win streak. Keith is the younger brother to two-time Heisman Trophy winner Archie Griffin.
