= Brian Davis (American football) =

American football player (born 1963)

No. 34, 31
- Position: Cornerback

Personal information
- Born: August 31, 1963 (age 63); Phoenix, Arizona, U.S.
- Listed height: 6 ft 2 in (1.88 m)
- Listed weight: 190 lb (86 kg)

Career information
- High school: Cortez (Phoenix)
- College: Nebraska
- NFL draft: 1987: 2nd round, 30th overall pick

Career history
- Washington Redskins (1987–1990); Seattle Seahawks (1991–1992); San Diego Chargers (1993); Buffalo Bills (1994)*; Minnesota Vikings (1994)
- * Offseason or practice squad member only

Awards and highlights
- Super Bowl champion (XXII); Second-team All-Big Eight (1986)

Career NFL statistics
- Tackles: 157
- Interceptions: 9
- Fumble recoveries: 1
- Stats at Pro Football Reference

Brian Wesley Davis (born August 31, 1963) is an American former professional football player who was a cornerback in the National Football League (NFL) for the Washington Redskins, the Seattle Seahawks, the San Diego Chargers, and the Minnesota Vikings. He played college football for the Nebraska Cornhuskers and was selected 30th overall in the second round of the 1987 NFL draft.

With the Redskins in the 1987-88 NFL playoffs, Davis became the last player to tackle Chicago Bears running back Walter Payton, who retired at the end of the season. Later, in Super Bowl XXII, Davis intercepted Denver Broncos quarterback John Elway as the Redskins defeated the Broncos, 42–10.

Pre-draft measurables
Height	Weight	Arm length	Hand span	40-yard dash	10-yard split	20-yard split	20-yard shuttle	Vertical jump	Broad jump	Bench press
6 ft 1 1/8 in (1.86 m)	189 lb (86 kg)	30 1/2 in (0.77 m)	8 1/4 in (0.21 m)	4.45 s	1.55 s	2.60 s	4.17 s	35.5 in (0.90 m)	9 ft 11 in (3.02 m)	8 reps
All values from NFL Combine
