= Ray Hitchcock =

American football player (born 1965)

No. 59
- Position: Center

Personal information
- Born: June 20, 1965 (age 61); Saint Paul, Minnesota, U.S.
- Listed height: 6 ft 2 in (1.88 m)
- Listed weight: 289 lb (131 kg)

Career information
- High school: Johnson (Saint Paul)
- College: Minnesota
- NFL draft: 1987: 12th round, 331st overall pick

Career history
- Washington Redskins (1987–1988)

Awards and highlights
- Super Bowl champion (XXII); 2× Second-team All-Big Ten (1985, 1986)

Career NFL statistics
- Games played: 5
- Stats at Pro Football Reference

Raebern Brooks Hitchcock Jr (born June 20, 1965) is an American former professional football player who was an offensive lineman in the National Football League (NFL) for the Washington Redskins, who selected in the 12th round of the 1987 NFL draft with the 331st overall pick. He played college football for the Minnesota Golden Gophers and attended Saint Paul Johnson High School.

Hitchcock currently serves as the offensive line coach at Cretin-Derham Hall High School.
