= Steve Hamilton (American football) =

American football player (born 1961)

No. 64
- Positions: Defensive end, defensive tackle

Personal information
- Born: September 29, 1961 (age 65); Niagara Falls, New York, U.S.
- Listed height: 6 ft 4 in (1.93 m)
- Listed weight: 263 lb (119 kg)

Career information
- High school: Williamsville (NY) East; Fork Union (VA) Military Academy
- College: East Carolina
- NFL draft: 1984: 2nd round, 55th overall pick

Career history
- Washington Redskins (1984–1988); Detroit Lions (1989)*; San Francisco 49ers (1990)*
- * Offseason or practice squad member only

Awards and highlights
- Super Bowl champion (XXII); Second-team All-South Independent (1982)

Career NFL statistics
- Sacks: 6.5
- Fumble recoveries: 1
- Stats at Pro Football Reference

Steven Hamilton (born September 28, 1961) is an American former professional football player who was a defensive end in the National Football League (NFL) for the Washington Redskins. He played college football for the East Carolina Pirates and was selected 55th overall in the second round of the 1984 NFL draft.
