= Tim Morrison (American football) =

American football player (born 1963)

No. 41
- Position: Cornerback

Personal information
- Born: April 3, 1963 (age 63); Raeford, North Carolina, U.S.

Career information
- High school: Terry Sanford (NC)
- College: North Carolina

Career history
- 1986–1987: Washington Redskins
- Stats at Pro Football Reference

Timothy Morrison (born April 3, 1963) is an American former professional football cornerback who played in the National Football League (NFL) for the Washington Redskins. He played college football at the University of North Carolina at Chapel Hill. His nephew Antwoine Sanders was also a football player.
