= Reggie Branch =

American football player (born 1962)

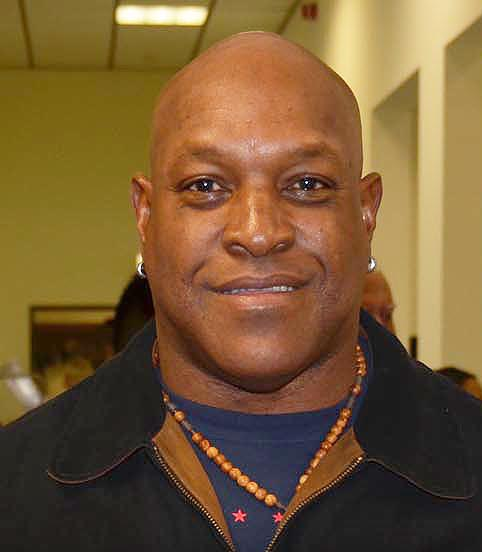

No. 30, 29
- Position: Running back

Personal information
- Born: October 22, 1962 (age 64); Sanford, Florida, U.S.
- Listed height: 5 ft 11 in (1.80 m)
- Listed weight: 232 lb (105 kg)

Career information
- High school: Seminole (Sanford)
- College: East Carolina
- NFL draft: 1985: undrafted

Career history
- Washington Redskins (1985–1989)

Awards and highlights
- Super Bowl champion (XXII)

Career NFL statistics
- Rushing yards: 9
- Rushing average: 2.3
- Touchdowns: 1
- Stats at Pro Football Reference

Reginald Etoy Branch (born October 22, 1962) is an American former professional football player who was a running back for the Washington Redskins of the National Football League (NFL). He played college football for the West Virginia State Yellow Jackets and East Carolina Pirates.

== Early life ==
Reggie attended Seminole High School in Sanford, Florida. He was Coached by Jesse "celltech", and Emory Blake, former NFL player and NFL quarterback Jeff Blake's father.

== College career ==
Reggie began his college career at West Virginia State, where he played only one season. He then transferred to East Carolina University in the spring of 1981 and was given a redshirt and placed on the practice team. In the spring of 1982, he was moved over to fullback and was the backup to Earnest Byner. Reggie's uncle, Tony Collins, was also an ECU running back, along with eventual Washington Redskins teammate Earnest Byner.

== Personal life ==
Branch worked at the Starboard Restaurant and Bar, located in Dewey Beach, Delaware.
