= Markus Koch =

German gridiron football player (born 1963)

No. 74
- Positions: Defensive end, defensive tackle

Personal information
- Born: February 13, 1963 (age 63); Marsberg, Germany
- Listed height: 6 ft 5 in (1.96 m)
- Listed weight: 270 lb (122 kg)

Career information
- High school: Eastwood Collegiate Institute (Canada)
- College: Boise State
- NFL draft: 1986: 2nd round, 30th overall pick
- CFL draft: 1986: 1st round, 3rd overall pick

Career history
- Washington Redskins (1986–1991)

Awards and highlights
- 2× Super Bowl champion (XXII, XXVI)

Career NFL statistics
- Sacks: 10.5
- Fumble recoveries: 3
- Stats at Pro Football Reference

Markus Koch (born February 13, 1963) is a German-born former professional American football defensive lineman in the National Football League (NFL) for the Washington Redskins team which won a Super Bowl in 1988. He played high school football at the Eastwood Collegiate Institute in Kitchener, Ontario and played college football at Boise State University.

Koch served as vice president of the Seattle chapter of the National Football League Players Association (NFLPA).

Having finished his career before the internet age, Koch is overlooked by the media, which call Sebastian Vollmer of the Patriots the first German to be drafted (2nd, 2009) by the NFL and to win a Super Bowl. This is because Koch, unlike Vollmer, never learned the sport at a German club and never played in a German amateur league.

== College career ==
Koch was a three-time All-American at Boise State, playing from 1982-85. For three consecutive years he was selected first-team All-Big Sky Conference (1983–85).

== Professional career ==
In the 1986 NFL draft, Koch was selected in the 2nd round as the 30th overall pick by the Washington Redskins. He was also selected in the 1986 CFL draft by the Toronto Argonauts. Koch played in Super Bowl XXII in 1988 and was on injured reserve for Super Bowl XXVI in 1992.

Koch injured his knee during the October 6, 1991 20-7 victory over the Chicago Bears and was replaced by Jason Buck. This would be the last time Koch played in the NFL.

Koch was inducted into the Boise State Hall of Fame in 1993.

== Life after football ==
After spending six years in the NFL, Koch received his License Massage Practitioner, Craniosacral Therapist, Acupressure Therapist, Reflexologist, Certified Yoga Instructor, and Vipassana Meditation Instructor qualifications. In his work he uses acupressure, life coaching, energy work, massage therapy, and reflexology. He works with his wife at Holistic PT in Port Townsend, Washington.

Koch and his wife Amy were featured in "The Crazy Wisdom Journal" for their massage therapy work. They also guide yearly retreats to Brazil.

== Personal life ==
Koch currently lives in Port Townsend, Washington.
