= Dean Hamel =

American football player (born 1961)

No. 78, 60
- Position: Defensive tackle

Personal information
- Born: July 7, 1961 (age 65); Detroit, Michigan, U.S.
- Listed height: 6 ft 3 in (1.91 m)
- Listed weight: 275 lb (125 kg)

Career information
- High school: Warren Mott (MI)
- College: Tulsa
- NFL draft: 1985: 12th round, 309th overall pick

Career history
- Washington Redskins (1985–1988); Dallas Cowboys (1989–1990)

Awards and highlights
- Super Bowl champion (XXII); NFL All-Rookie team (1985)

Career NFL statistics
- Games played: 88
- Sacks: 12.5
- Stats at Pro Football Reference

Dean Edward Hamel (born July 7, 1961) is an American former professional football player who was a defensive tackle in the National Football League (NFL) for the Washington Redskins and Dallas Cowboys. He played college football for the Tulsa Golden Hurricane and was selected in the 12th round of the 1985 NFL draft.

== Early life ==
Hamel attended Warren Mott High School. He began his college career at Coffeyville Community College as an offensive tackle in 1980, where he blocked for future Heisman Trophy winner Mike Rozier. He was named an honorable-mention junior college All-American in his second season.

He transferred to the University of Tulsa, where he was an offensive lineman as a junior. He was converted into a defensive tackle in his senior season, registering 44 tackles, 4 tackles for loss and 3 sacks. He was a backup in both years.

== Professional career ==
=== Washington Redskins ===
Hamel was selected by the Washington Redskins in the 12th round (309th overall) of the 1985 NFL draft, even though he wasn't a starter in college. As a rookie, he was given the nickname tazmanian devil and was named the starter at right defensive tackle for the last eight games of the season. In his first start against the Atlanta Falcons, he had 9 tackles and 3 sacks, including a safety against quarterback Joe Montana. He collected 63 tackles, 6 sacks (third on the team) and received NFL All-Rookie honors.

The next season, he also started 8 games, registered 37 tackles and was named to the All-Madden Team because of his special teams play. He returned to a backup role for the next two years, playing mainly on special teams and in short-yardage situations.

In 1987, he played all of the second half and made a key tackle in the NFC championship game, with the Minnesota Vikings at the Redskins' two-yard line to avoid being tied on the scoreboard. He was also a member of the Redskins Super Bowl XXII Championship team. In 1988, he made 14 tackles, 2 sacks and was third on the team in special teams tackles.

In 1989, he was chosen to replace the retired Dave Butz at left defensive tackle, but walked out of training camp threatening to retire, after dealing with the emergence of rookie Tracy Rocker and having a poor preseason game against the Buffalo Bills. After the incident, head coach Joe Gibbs refused to allow him to return and traded him to the Dallas Cowboys in exchange for a fifth round draft choice (#110-Junior Robinson).

=== Dallas Cowboys ===
In 1989, Hamel was acquired to help compensate for the retirement of Randy White and the season ending injury of Mark Walen. Initially he was named the starter at right defensive tackle and was switched to the left side for the last 9 games. He posted 68 tackles, 3.5 sacks (second on the team), 28 quarterback pressures (second on the team) and one pass defensed.

In 1990, he suffered a sprained right knee in practice on October 10 and was placed on the injured reserve list. He returned for the eleventh game against the Los Angeles Rams. He started 11 games at left defensive tackle, recording 33 tackles, one sack, 5 quarterback pressures, one pass defensed, one forced fumble and one fumble recovery.

In June 1991, he injured his back while weightlifting and never fully recovered. The Cowboys placed him on the injured reserve list and released him after a couple of weeks on August 26.

== Personal life ==
Hamel resides in Lenoir, North Carolina and works at a plant in the area. He has 3 children, the oldest being Megan Eadus, Melanie Hamel and Dylan Hamel. His son Dylan played college baseball at Appalachian State.
