= 1992 Washington Redskins season =

61st season in franchise history

- Owner: Jack Kent Cooke
- General manager: Charley Casserly
- President: John Kent Cooke
- Head coach: Joe Gibbs
- Offensive coordinator: Joe Gibbs
- Defensive coordinator: Richie Petitbon
- Home stadium: RFK Stadium

Results
- Record: 9–7
- Division place: 3rd NFC East
- Playoffs: Won Wild Card Playoffs (at Vikings) 24–7; Lost Divisional Playoffs (at 49ers) 13–20
- All-Pros: LB Wilber Marshall
- Pro Bowlers: LB Wilber Marshall

The 1992 Washington Redskins season was the franchise's 61st season in the National Football League. The Redskins finished with a record of 9–7, making the 1992–93 NFL playoffs and winning a Wild Card game against the Minnesota Vikings before losing to the San Francisco 49ers in the Divisional Round. The Redskins did not qualify for the postseason again until the 1999 season. The season would be head coach Joe Gibbs' final with the team until he returned in the 2004 season.

== Draft ==
The Redskins traded up in the first round to draft Desmond Howard, who would go on to play the most games for the Redskins of the draft class, despite only playing in 48 games for the team. He later won Super Bowl MVP as a member of the Green Bay Packers. Howard went on to have the longest career of the draft class playing 11 seasons, while the remainder of the draft class was out of league by the end of the 1997 season, all but one (Matt Elliott) of which was out by the end of the 1994 season. In 2015, the entire 1992 NFL Draft was named the worst draft class from 1990 to 2015 by NFL.com.

1992 Washington Redskins draft
Round	Pick	Player	Position	College	Notes
1	4	Desmond Howard *	Wide receiver	Michigan	from Cincinnati
2	47	Shane Collins	Defensive end	Arizona State	from Kansas City via Dallas
3	74	Paul Siever	Tackle	Penn State	from Kansas City via Dallas
4	112	Chris Hakel	Quarterback	William & Mary	
6	168	Ray Rowe	Tight end	San Diego State	
7	196	Calvin Holmes	Defensive back	USC	
8	224	Darryl Moore	Guard	UTEP	
9	252	Boone Powell	Linebacker	Texas	
10	280	Tony Barker	Linebacker	Rice	
11	308	Terry Smith	Wide receiver	Penn State	
12	336	Matt Elliott	Center	Michigan	
Made roster * Made at least one Pro Bowl during career

== Roster ==
1992 Washington Redskins roster
Quarterbacks (QB): 12 Cary Conklin; 10 Jeff Rutledge; 11 Mark Rypien; Running backs (RB): 21 Earnest Byner; 32 Ricky Ervins; 39 Robert Green; 30 Brian Mitchell; Wide receivers (WR): 84 Gary Clark; 24 Carl Harry; 80 Desmond Howard; 81 Art Monk; 83 Ricky Sanders; Tight ends (TE): 88 James Jenkins; 87 Ron Middleton; 89 Terry Orr; 82 Ray Rowe	Offensive linemen (OL): 67 Ray Brown G; 52 Matt Elliott C; 72 Mike Haight T; 66 Joe Jacoby T; 79 Jim Lachey T; 63 Raleigh McKenzie C; 69 Mark Schlereth G; 76 Ed Simmons T; Defensive linemen (DL): 99 Jason Buck DT; 91 Shane Collins DE; 97 Jumpy Geathers DT; 78 Tim Johnson DT; 71 Charles Mann DE; 60 Fred Stokes DE; 77 Jim Wahler DT	Linebackers (LB): 98 Tony Barker OLB; 59 John Brantley MLB; 51 Monte Coleman OLB; 55 Andre Collins OLB; 54 Kurt Gouveia MLB; 58 Wilber Marshall OLB; Defensive backs (DB): 22 Todd Bowles SS; 26 Danny Copeland SS; 27 Brad Edwards FS; 28 Darrell Green CB; 29 David Gulledge FS; 47 A. J. Johnson CB; 20 Alvoid Mays CB; 41 Johnny Thomas CB; Special teams (ST): 57 Guy Bingham LS; 2 Kelly Goodburn P; 8 Chip Lohmiller K	Practice squad: —— Kevin Brothen G; 73 Tom Fuhler DT; -- Calvin Holmes CB; 56 Tom Myslinski G; -- George Searcy RB; Reserve: 61 Mark Adickes G (IR); 53 Jeff Bostic C (IR); 93 Victor Cahoon WR (IR); 50 Ravin Caldwell LB (IR); 64 Mo Elewonibi G (IR); 6 Chris Hakel QB (IR); 34 Terry Hoage S (IR); 86 Stephen Hobbs WR (IR); 45 Sidney Johnson CB (IR); 35 Martin Mayhew CB (IR); 62 Darryl Moore G (PUP); -- Paul Peters WR (IR); -- Boone Powell LB (IR); 95 Ted Rogers LB (IR); 44 John Settle RB (IR); -- Cris Shale P (IR); 74 Paul Siever T (PUP); -- Mark Stock WR (PUP); 31 Clarence Vaughn S (IR); 85 Don Warren TE (IR); 75 Eric Williams DT (IR); 94 Bobby Wilson DT (IR); Rookies in italics

== Schedule ==
=== Pre-season ===
Week	Date	Opponent	Result	Record
1	August 1	at Miami Dolphins	**L** 21–22	0–1
2	August 8	at New York Jets	**L** 13–14	0–2
3	August 16	San Francisco 49ers	**L** 15–17	0–3
4	August 22	at Los Angeles Raiders	**W** 27–23	1–3
5	August 28	Minnesota Vikings	**L** 0–30	1–4

=== Regular season ===
Week	Date	Opponent	Result	Record	Venue	Attendance	Game recap
1	September 7	at **Dallas Cowboys**	**L** 10–23	0–1	Texas Stadium	63,538	Recap
2	September 13	Atlanta Falcons	**W** 24–17	1–1	RFK Stadium	54,343	Recap
3	September 20	Detroit Lions	**W** 13–10	2–1	RFK Stadium	55,818	Recap
4	Bye						
5	October 4	at **Phoenix Cardinals**	**L** 24–27	2–2	Sun Devil Stadium	34,488	Recap
6	October 12	Denver Broncos	**W** 34–3	3–2	RFK Stadium	56,371	Recap
7	October 18	**Philadelphia Eagles**	**W** 16–12	4–2	RFK Stadium	56,380	Recap
8	October 25	at Minnesota Vikings	**W** 15–13	5–2	Hubert H. Humphrey Metrodome	59,098	Recap
9	November 1	**New York Giants**	**L** 7–24	5–3	RFK Stadium	53,647	Recap
10	November 8	at Seattle Seahawks	**W** 16–3	6–3	Kingdome	53,616	Recap
11	November 15	at Kansas City Chiefs	**L** 16–35	6–4	Arrowhead Stadium	75,238	Recap
12	November 23	at New Orleans Saints	**L** 3–20	6–5	Louisiana Superdome	68,591	Recap
13	November 29	**Phoenix Cardinals**	**W** 41–3	7–5	RFK Stadium	53,541	Recap
14	December 6	at **New York Giants**	**W** 28–10	8–5	Giants Stadium	62,998	Recap
15	December 13	**Dallas Cowboys**	**W** 20–17	9–5	RFK Stadium	56,437	Recap
16	December 20	at **Philadelphia Eagles**	**L** 13–17	9–6	Veterans Stadium	65,841	Recap
17	December 26	Los Angeles Raiders	**L** 20–21	9–7	RFK Stadium	53,032	Recap

Note: Intra-division opponents are in bold text.

== Playoffs ==
Round	Date	Opponent (seed)	Result	Record	Venue	Attendance	Game recap
Wild Card	January 2, 1993	at Minnesota Vikings	W 24–7	1–0	Hubert H. Humphrey Metrodome	57,363	Recap
Divisional	January 9, 1993	at San Francisco 49ers	L 13–20	1–1	Candlestick Park	64,991	Recap

== Standings ==
NFC East
	W	L	T	PCT	DIV	CONF	PF	PA	STK
^{(2)} Dallas Cowboys	13	3	0	.813	6–2	9–3	409	243	W2
^{(5)} Philadelphia Eagles	11	5	0	.688	6–2	8–4	354	245	W4
^{(6)} Washington Redskins	9	7	0	.563	4–4	7–5	300	255	L2
New York Giants	6	10	0	.375	2–6	4–8	306	367	L1
Phoenix Cardinals	4	12	0	.250	2–6	4–10	243	332	L2
