= 1991 Washington Redskins season =

60th season in franchise history; Super Bowl champions

- Owner: Jack Kent Cooke
- General manager: Charley Casserly
- President: John Kent Cooke
- Head coach: Joe Gibbs
- Offensive coordinator: Joe Gibbs
- Defensive coordinator: Richie Petitbon
- Home stadium: RFK Stadium

Results
- Record: 14–2
- Division place: 1st NFC East
- Playoffs: Won Divisional Playoffs (vs. Falcons) 24–7; Won NFC Championship (vs. Lions) 41–10; Won Super Bowl XXVI (vs. Bills) 37–24
- All-Pros: 9: QB Mark Rypien (2nd team); RB Earnest Byner (2nd team); WR Gary Clark (2nd team); OT Jim Lachey (1st team); K Chip Lohmiller (2nd team); KR Brian Mitchell (2nd team); CB Darrell Green (2nd team); LB Wilber Marshall (2nd team); DE Charles Mann (2nd team)
- Pro Bowlers: 8: QB Mark Rypien; RB Earnest Byner; WR Gary Clark; OT Jim Lachey; G Mark Schlereth; DE Charles Mann; CB Darrell Green; K Chip Lohmiller

The 1991 season was the Washington Redskins' 60th in the National Football League (NFL), their 55th representing Washington, D.C., and the eleventh under head coach Joe Gibbs.

The Redskins were coming off two consecutive 10–6 seasons and looking to return to the playoffs for a second straight season. Not only did the Redskins improve their position, but they also put together a season that is considered by some to be one of the best any team has ever played. Washington won a franchise record-tying 14 games, the best record in the league, and their two losses (to two of their division rivals) were by a combined five points. The Redskins ended their campaign as world champions, knocking off the defending AFC Champion Buffalo Bills 37–24, in Super Bowl XXVI.

The Redskins led the league in scoring with 485 points and allowed the second-fewest points (224) in the league, which was an average of 14 points per game. (As of the 1991 season, this was the third-highest total in NFL history, and still ranks in the top 20 all-time.) They had a +18 turnover ratio, also best in the NFL. Their point differential of +261 was the best in franchise history, and the sixth-highest of all time. In 2016, Chris Chase of USA Today ranked the team as the greatest to ever win a Super Bowl. They would not return to the NFC Championship Game or win more than 10 regular season games again until 2024, which came several years after the team had changed its name. However, as of 2025, this remains the most recent season where Washington appeared in a Super Bowl.

Statistics site Football Outsiders ranks the 1991 Redskins as the best team they have measured (from 1986 to present). The team ranked No. 15 on the 100 greatest teams of all time presented by the NFL on its 100th anniversary.

NFL Films produced a direct-to-home video documentary about the team's season entitled Super Bowl XXVI Champions; it was narrated by Harry Kalas, and produced a documentary about the team's season entitled March to Minneapolis; it was narrated by Jeff Kaye. On January 12, 2007, NFL Network aired America's Game: The Super Bowl Champions, in which they ranked the 1991 Redskins at #14; the film was narrated by Donald Sutherland and featured commentary from head coach Joe Gibbs and players Mark Rypien and Charles Mann.

== The season ==
Quarterback Mark Rypien had an outstanding year. His 8.5 yards per pass attempt was second in the league, and his 3,564 passing yards were best in the NFC and fourth in the league. Running back Earnest Byner's 1,048 rushing yards were 5th best in the NFL. The Redskins had two wide receivers who went over 1,000 yards receiving in 1991: Gary Clark (1,340) and Art Monk (1,049).

The Redskins beat the Buffalo Bills 37–24 to win Super Bowl XXVI. The team is also the last Super Bowl champion to never trail in any of their playoff victories. The Redskins' Super Bowl XXVI win was their first in a non-strike season. With the championship, coach Joe Gibbs also became the first head coach to win three Super Bowls with three different quarterbacks.

In 2007, ESPN.com ranked the 1991 Redskins as the 4th greatest team in NFL history, noting, "you can look at two stats to get a pretty good idea of just how great a team is: yards gained per pass attempt, and yards allowed per pass attempt. The 1991 'Skins topped the NFL in each category, with Mark Rypien averaging 8.5 yards per attempt, while his colleagues on Washington's defense allowed only 6 yards per attempt.... The 'Skins outscored their opponents 485–224, and they had a tough schedule. After going 14–2, they romped through the NFC playoffs, beating the Falcons 24–7 and demolishing the Lions 41–10 on their way to the Super Bowl. In the Big Game, the 'Skins beat the cursed early-1990s Bills 37–24."

Statistics site Football Outsiders has ranked the 1991 Redskins as the greatest team in their ratings history, stating that the team "may have been the most well-rounded team in NFL history. [...] A lot of the best teams in NFL history got a little extra boost by picking on an easy schedule, but not Washington. They had an average schedule, and a harder-than-average schedule of opposing defenses. One reason for that: 1991 was not only the year of the best overall team in [their rating system's] history. It was also the year of the best defense in [their system's] history, which showed up on Washington's schedule twice: the 1991 Philadelphia Eagles."

== Draft ==
1991 Washington Redskins draft
Round	Pick	Player	Position	College
1	17	Bobby Wilson	DT	Michigan St.
3	76	Ricky Ervins	RB	USC
6	159	Dennis Ransom	TE	Texas A&M
7	188	Keith Cash	TE	Texas
8	215	Jimmy Spencer	DB	Florida
9	243	Charles Bell	DB	Baylor
10	270	Cris Shale	P	Bowling Green
11	299	David Gulledge	DB	Jacksonville St.
12	326	Keenan McCardell	WR	UNLV

== Personnel ==
=== Staff ===
1991 Washington Commanders staff
Front office: Chairman/COO – Jack Kent Cooke; Executive vice president – John Kent Cooke; General manager – Charley Casserly; Assistant general manager – Bobby Mitchell; Director of player personnel – Kirk Mee; Director of pro scouting – Joe Mack; Director of college scouting – George Saimes; Scouting administrator – Mel Kaufman; Head coaches: Head coach – Joe Gibbs; Assistant head coach/defense – Richie Petitbon; Offensive coaches: Quarterbacks/passing game – Rod Dowhower; Running backs – Don Breaux; Wide receivers – Charley Taylor; Offensive line – Jim Hanifan and Rennie Simmons; Offensive assistant/receivers – Jack Burns	Defensive coaches: Defensive coordinator – Larry Peccatiello; Defensive line – LaVern Torgeson; Defensive backs – Emmitt Thomas; Defensive line – Bobby DePaul; Special teams coaches: Special teams – Wayne Sevier; Strength and conditioning: Strength – Dan Riley; Assistant strength – Steve Wetzel

=== Roster ===
1991 Washington Commanders roster
Quarterbacks (QB): 16 Stan Humphries; 10 Jeff Rutledge; 11 Mark Rypien; Running backs (RB): 21 Earnest Byner; 32 Ricky Ervins; 30 Brian Mitchell; 37 Gerald Riggs; Wide receivers (WR): 84 Gary Clark; 86 Stephen Hobbs; 81 Art Monk; 83 Ricky Sanders; Tight ends (TE): 88 James Jenkins; 87 Ron Middleton; 89 Terry Orr; 85 Don Warren	Offensive linemen (OL): 61 Mark Adickes G; 53 Jeff Bostic C; 68 Russ Grimm G; 66 Joe Jacoby T; 79 Jim Lachey T; 63 Raleigh McKenzie G; 69 Mark Schlereth G; 76 Ed Simmons T; Defensive linemen (DL): 99 Jason Buck DE; 97 Jumpy Geathers DT; 78 Tim Johnson DT; 71 Charles Mann DE; 60 Fred Stokes DE; 75 Eric Williams DT; 94 Bobby Wilson DT	Linebackers (LB): 50 Ravin Caldwell OLB; 51 Monte Coleman OLB; 55 Andre Collins OLB; 54 Kurt Gouveia MLB; 58 Wilber Marshall OLB; 57 Matt Millen MLB; Defensive backs (DB): 26 Danny Copeland SS; 27 Brad Edwards FS; 28 Darrell Green CB; 47 A. J. Johnson CB; 45 Sidney Johnson CB; 35 Martin Mayhew CB; 20 Alvoid Mays CB; 40 Alvin Walton SS; Special teams (ST): 82 John Brandes LS; 2 Kelly Goodburn P; 8 Chip Lohmiller K	Practice squad: 24 Carl Harry WR; 46 Dennis Ransom TE; 72 Thomas Rayam G; 95 Ted Rogers LB; 23 Jimmy Spencer; Reserve: 65 Ray Brown G (IR); 12 Cary Conklin QB (IR); 64 Mo Elewonibi G (IR); 29 David Gulledge S (IR); 34 Terry Hoage S (IR); 88 Jimmie Johnson TE (IR); 80 Joe Johnson WR (IR); 74 Markus Koch DE (IR); -- Keenan McCardell WR (IR); 44 John Settle RB (IR); -- Cris Shale P (IR); 31 Clarence Vaughn S (IR); 47 active, 12 inactive, 5 practice squad Rookies in italics

== Preseason ==
Week	Date	Opponent	Result	Record	Venue	Recap
1	August 4	at Pittsburgh Steelers	L 7–16	0–1	Three Rivers Stadium	Recap
2	August 10	at New England Patriots	W 27–6	1–1	Foxboro Stadium	Recap
3	August 16	Cleveland Browns	L 21–24 (OT)	1–2	RFK Stadium	Recap
4	August 24	vs. New York Jets	L 9–13	1–3	Williams–Brice Stadium	Recap

== Preseason Game summaries ==
=== Week P3 (Friday, August 16, 1991): vs. Cleveland Browns ===
Week P3: Cleveland Browns at Washington Redskins – Game summary

Quarter	1	2	3	4	OT	Total
Browns (2–1)	0	7	7	7	3	24
Redskins (1–2)	7	7	7	0	0	21

at RFK Stadium • Washington, D.C.

- Game time: 8:00 p.m. EDT
- Game attendance: 51,137
- TV: WTTG-TV

== Regular season ==
Note: Division opponents are bolded

=== Schedule ===
Week	Date	Opponent	Result	Record	Venue	Recap
1	September 1	Detroit Lions	**W** 45–0	1–0	RFK Stadium	Recap
2	September 9	at **Dallas Cowboys**	**W** 33–31	2–0	Texas Stadium	Recap
3	September 15	**Phoenix Cardinals**	**W** 34–0	3–0	RFK Stadium	Recap
4	September 22	at Cincinnati Bengals	**W** 34–27	4–0	Riverfront Stadium	Recap
5	September 30	**Philadelphia Eagles**	**W** 23–0	5–0	RFK Stadium	Recap
6	October 6	at Chicago Bears	**W** 20–7	6–0	Soldier Field	Recap
7	October 13	Cleveland Browns	**W** 42–17	7–0	RFK Stadium	Recap
8	Bye					
9	October 27	at **New York Giants**	**W** 17–13	8–0	Giants Stadium	Recap
10	November 3	Houston Oilers	**W** 16–13 (OT)	9–0	RFK Stadium	Recap
11	November 10	Atlanta Falcons	**W** 56–17	10–0	RFK Stadium	Recap
12	November 17	at Pittsburgh Steelers	**W** 41–14	11–0	Three Rivers Stadium	Recap
13	November 24	**Dallas Cowboys**	**L** 21–24	11–1	RFK Stadium	Recap
14	December 1	at Los Angeles Rams	**W** 27–6	12–1	Anaheim Stadium	Recap
15	December 8	at **Phoenix Cardinals**	**W** 20–14	13–1	Sun Devil Stadium	Recap
16	December 15	**New York Giants**	**W** 34–17	14–1	RFK Stadium	Recap
17	December 22	at **Philadelphia Eagles**	**L** 22–24	14–2	Veterans Stadium	Recap

=== Game summaries ===
==== Week 1 ====
Week 1: Detroit Lions at Washington Redskins

Quarter	1	2	3	4	Total
Lions	0	0	0	0	**0**
**Redskins**	21	14	7	3	**45**

at RFK Stadium • Washington, D.C.

- Date: September 1, 1991
- Game time: 8:00 p.m. EDT
- Game weather: Clear; 76 °F (24 °C)
- Game attendance: 52,958
- Referee: Gordon McCarter
- TV announcers (TNT): Skip Caray (play-by-play) and Pat Haden (color commentator)
- Pro-Football-Reference.com

Game information

Lions

- Rodney Peete
  8/22, 75 Yds, 3 INT
- Cedric Jackson
  10 Rush, 39 Yds
- Don Overton
  4 Rec, 38 Yds

Redskins

- Mark Rypien
  15/19, 183 Yds, 2 TD, INT
- Earnest Byner
  16 Rush, 83 Yds, TD
- Gary Clark
  6 Rec, 107 Yds, TD

Scoring summary

Quarter	Time	Drive			Team	Scoring information	Score	
Quarter	Time	Plays	Yards	TOP	Team	Scoring information	DET	WSH
1	5:37				Redskins	Riggs 1-yard touchdown run, Lohmiller kick good	0	7
1	3:34				Redskins	Johnson 4-yard touchdown reception from Rypien, Lohmiller kick good	0	14
1	0:55	—	—	—	Redskins	Mitchell 69-yard punt return, Lohmiller kick good	0	21
2	11:26				Redskins	Sanders 18-yard touchdown reception from Byner, Lohmiller kick good	0	28
2	1:03				Redskins	Byner 6-yard touchdown run, Lohmiller kick good	0	35
3	0:14				Redskins	Clark 38-yard touchdown reception from Rypien, Lohmiller kick good	0	42
4	7:45				Redskins	26-yard field goal by Lohmiller	0	45
"TOP" = time of possession. For other American football terms, see Glossary of American football.							0	45

==== Week 2 ====
Week 2: Washington Redskins at Dallas Cowboys

Quarter	1	2	3	4	Total
**Redskins**	7	13	3	10	**33**
Cowboys	14	7	3	7	**31**

at Texas Stadium • Irving, Texas

- Date: September 9, 1991
- Game time: 9:00 p.m. EDT
- Game weather: Clear; 81 °F (27 °C); wind 11
- Game attendance: 63,025
- Referee: Jerry Markbreit
- TV announcers (ABC): Al Michaels (play-by-play), Dan Dierdorf and Frank Gifford (color commentators)
- Pro-Football-Reference.com

Game information

Redskins

- Mark Rypien
  14/26, 203 Yds, 2 TD, INT
- Earnest Byner
  22 Rush, 101 Yds
- Ricky Sanders
  5 Rec, 85 Yds

Cowboys

- Troy Aikman
  27/42, 242 Yds, 3 TD
- Emmitt Smith
  11 Rush, 112 Yds, TD
- Emmitt Smith
  8 Rec, 42 Yds, TD

Scoring summary

Quarter	Time	Drive			Team	Scoring information	Score	
Quarter	Time	Plays	Yards	TOP	Team	Scoring information	WSH	DAL
1	8:23				Cowboys	Novacek 3-yard touchdown reception from Aikman, Willis kick good	0	7
1	4:47				Redskins	Johnson 3-yard touchdown reception from Rypien, Lohmiller kick good	7	7
1	3:48				Cowboys	Smith 75-yard touchdown run, Willis kick good	7	14
2	14:15				Redskins	53-yard field goal by Lohmiller	10	14
2	5:42				Cowboys	Smith 5-yard touchdown reception from Aikman, Willis kick good	10	21
2	4:18				Redskins	Monk 37-yard touchdown reception from Rypien, Lohmiller kick good	17	21
2	0:08				Redskins	52-yard field goal by Lohmiller	20	21
3	11:53				Redskins	45-yard field goal by Lohmiller	23	21
3	6:08				Cowboys	51-yard field goal by Willis	23	24
4	12:48				Redskins	Riggs 1-yard touchdown run, Lohmiller kick good	30	24
4	5:39				Redskins	46-yard field goal by Lohmiller	33	24
4	0:02				Cowboys	Irvin 6-yard touchdown reception from Aikman, Willis kick good	33	31
"TOP" = time of possession. For other American football terms, see Glossary of American football.							33	31

==== Week 3 ====
Week 3: Phoenix Cardinals at Washington Redskins

Quarter	1	2	3	4	Total
Cardinals	0	0	0	0	**0**
**Redskins**	7	7	14	6	**34**

at RFK Stadium • Washington, D.C.

- Date: September 15, 1991
- Game time: 1:00 p.m. EDT
- Game weather: Clear; 76 °F (24 °C)
- Game attendance: 54,662
- Referee: Tom White
- TV announcers (CBS): James Brown (play-by-play) and Randy Cross (color commentator)
- Pro-Football-Reference.com

Game information

Cardinals

- Tom Tupa
  13/24, 120 Yds, 3 INT
- Johnny Johnson
  8 Rush, 27 Yds
- Tim Jorden
  5 Rec, 36 Yds

Redskins

- Mark Rypien
  15/23, 181 Yds, TD
- Earnest Byner
  23 Rush, 109 Yds, TD
- Gary Clark
  5 Rec, 72 Yds

Scoring summary

Quarter	Time	Drive			Team	Scoring information	Score	
Quarter	Time	Plays	Yards	TOP	Team	Scoring information	PHO	WSH
1	8:37				Redskins	Byner 2-yard touchdown run, Lohmiller kick good	0	7
2	14:07				Redskins	Sanders 10-yard touchdown run, Lohmiller kick good	0	14
3	9:52				Redskins	Clark 28-yard touchdown reception from Rypien, Lohmiller kick good	0	21
3	7:06	—	—	—	Redskins	Interception returned 55 yards for touchdown by Marshall, Lohmiller kick good	0	28
4	14:09				Redskins	49-yard field goal by Lohmiller	0	31
4	6:29				Redskins	48-yard field goal by Lohmiller	0	34
"TOP" = time of possession. For other American football terms, see Glossary of American football.							0	34

=== Week 4 (Sunday, September 22, 1991): at Cincinnati Bengals ===
Washington would not beat the Bengals again until 2020.

Week 4: Washington Redskins at Cincinnati Bengals – Game summary

Quarter	1	2	3	4	Total
Redskins (4–0)	3	21	3	7	**34**
Bengals (0–4)	7	3	14	3	**27**

at Riverfront Stadium • Cincinnati

- Date: September 22, 1991
- Game time: 1:00 p.m. EDT
- Game weather: Partly cloudy; 59 °F (15 °C)
- Game attendance: 52,038
- Referee: Stan Kemp
- TV announcers (CBS): Dick Stockton (play-by-play) and Merlin Olsen (color commentator)

Team	Category	Player	Statistics
WSH	Passing	Mark Rypien	15/23, 217 YDS, 1 INT
WSH	Rushing	Earnest Byner	18 CAR, 75 YDS
WSH	Receiving	Gary Clark	6 REC, 53 YDS
CIN	Passing	Boomer Esiason	18/37, 212 YDS, 1 INT
CIN	Rushing	Craig Taylor	5 CAR, 56 YDS
CIN	Receiving	Tim McGee	4 REC, 97 YDS

Scoring summary

Quarter	Time	Drive			Team	Scoring information	Score	
Quarter	Time	Plays	Yards	TOP	Team	Scoring information	WSH	CIN
1	10:20				Redskins	40-yard field goal by Lohmiller	3	0
1	0:58				Bengals	Brooks 5-yard touchdown run, Breech kick good	3	7
2	9:08				Redskins	Riggs 1-yard touchdown run, Lohmiller kick good	10	7
2	5:38				Bengals	46-yard field goal by Breech	10	10
2	3:48				Redskins	Riggs 1-yard touchdown run, Lohmiller kick good	17	10
2	2:13	—	—	—	Redskins	Mitchell 66-yard punt return for a touchdown, Lohmiller kick good	24	10
3	12:01				Redskins	26-yard field goal by Lohmiller	27	10
3	6:12				Bengals	Taylor 1-yard touchdown run, Breech kick good	27	17
3	1:37				Bengals	Taylor 34-yard touchdown run, Breech kick good	27	24
4	9:48				Bengals	25-yard field goal by Breech	27	27
4	2:02				Redskins	Riggs 7-yard touchdown run, Lohmiller kick good	34	27
"TOP" = time of possession. For other American football terms, see Glossary of American football.							34	27

- Point spread: Redskins –3½
- Over/under: 43.0 **(over)**
- Time of game: 3 hours, 10 minutes

Redskins	Game statistics	Bengals
20	First downs	21
32–132	Rushes–yards	25–136
217	Passing yards	212
15–23–1	Passes	18–37–1
1–5	Sacked–yards	4–26
212	Net passing yards	186
344	Total yards	322
180	Return yards	63
2–40.0	Punts	3–46.7
1–1	Fumbles–lost	0–0
6–100	Penalties–yards	4–50
32:09	Time of possession	27:51

Individual stats

Redskins Passing
	C/ATT^{1}	Yds	TD	INT	Sk	Yds	LG^{3}	Rate
Rypien	15/23	217	0	1	1	5	54	77.6

Redskins Rushing
	Car^{2}	Yds	TD	LG^{3}
Byner	18	75	0	12
Riggs	10	61	3	20
Rypien	3	–2	0	0
Monk	1	–2	0	–2

Redskins Receiving
	Rec^{4}	Yds	TD	LG^{3}
Clark	6	53	0	17
Byner	5	56	0	27
Monk	2	84	0	52
Sanders	1	14	0	14
Hobbs	1	5	0	5

Redskins Kicking
	FGM–FGA	XPM–XPA
Lohmiller	2–2	4–4

Redskins Punting
	Pnt	Yds	Y/P	Lng	Blck
Goodburn	2	80	40.0	46	

Redskins Kick Returns
	Ret	Yds	Y/Rt	TD	Lng
Mitchell	2	54	27.0	0	0
Ervins	1	33	33.0	0	0

Redskins Punt Returns
	Ret	Yds	Y/Rt	TD	Lng
Mitchell	2	93	46.5	1	0

Redskins Sacks
	Sacks
Coleman	1.0
Mann	1.0
Stokes	1.0
Wilson	1.0

Redskins Interceptions
	Int	Yds	TD	LG	PD
Edwards	1	0	0	0	

==== Week 5 ====
Week 5: Philadelphia Eagles at Washington Redskins

Quarter	1	2	3	4	Total
Eagles	0	0	0	0	**0**
**Redskins**	0	10	3	10	**23**

at RFK Stadium • Washington, D.C.

- Date: September 30, 1991
- Game time: 9:00 p.m. EDT
- Game weather: Clear; 64 °F (18 °C)
- Game attendance: 55,198
- Referee: Bob McElwee
- TV announcers (ABC): Al Michaels (play-by-play), Dan Dierdorf and Frank Gifford (color commentators)
- Pro-Football-Reference.com

Game information

Eagles

- Jim McMahon
  4/6, 32 Yds
- Heath Sherman
  12 Rush, 38 Yds
- Fred Barnett
  2 Rec, 19 Yds

Redskins

- Mark Rypien
  13/23, 204 Yds, TD, 2 INT
- Earnest Byner
  29 Rush, 95 Yds, TD
- Art Monk
  3 Rec, 33 Yds, TD

Scoring summary

Quarter	Time	Drive			Team	Scoring information	Score	
Quarter	Time	Plays	Yards	TOP	Team	Scoring information	PHI	WSH
2	7:56				Redskins	Monk 19-yard touchdown reception from Rypien, Lohmiller kick good	0	7
2	3:26				Redskins	37-yard field goal by Lohmiller	0	10
3	4:38				Redskins	35-yard field goal by Lohmiller	0	13
4	11:21				Redskins	Byner 7-yard touchdown run, Lohmiller kick good	0	20
4	0:11				Redskins	27-yard field goal by Lohmiller	0	23
"TOP" = time of possession. For other American football terms, see Glossary of American football.							0	23

=== Week 6 (Sunday, October 6, 1991): at Chicago Bears ===
Week 6: Washington Redskins at Chicago Bears – Game summary

Quarter	1	2	3	4	Total
Redskins (6–0)	0	10	0	10	**20**
Bears (4–2)	0	0	7	0	**7**

at Soldier Field • Chicago

- Date: October 6, 1991
- Game time: 1:00 p.m. EDT
- Game weather: Partly cloudy; 43 °F (6 °C), relative humidity 64%, wind 16 miles per hour (26 km/h; 14 kn)
- Game attendance: 64,961
- Referee: Bernie Kukar
- TV announcers (CBS): Pat Summerall (play-by-play) and John Madden (color commentator)

Team	Category	Player	Statistics
WSH	Passing	Mark Rypien	18/31, 168 YDS, 2 TDs, 1 INT
WSH	Rushing	Earnest Byner	21 CAR, 63 YDS
WSH	Receiving	Art Monk	6 REC, 69 YDS, 2 TDs
CHI	Passing	Jim Harbaugh	17/41, 206 YDS, 3 INTs
CHI	Rushing	Neal Anderson	18 CAR, 73 YDS, 1 TD
CHI	Receiving	Ron Morris	5 REC, 106 YDS

Scoring summary

Quarter	Time	Drive			Team	Scoring information	Score	
Quarter	Time	Plays	Yards	TOP	Team	Scoring information	WSH	CHI
2	10:25				Redskins	47-yard field goal by Lohmiller	3	0
2	1:53				Redskins	Monk 26-yard touchdown reception from Rypien, Lohmiller kick good	10	0
3	1:42				Bears	Anderson 1-yard touchdown run, Butler kick good	10	7
4	6:20				Redskins	Monk 5-yard touchdown reception from Rypien, Lohmiller kick good	17	7
4	4:26				Redskins	23-yard field goal by Lohmiller	20	7
"TOP" = time of possession. For other American football terms, see Glossary of American football.							20	7

- Point spread: Redskins –3
- Over/under: 37.0 **(under)**
- Time of game: 2 hours, 58 minutes

Redskins	Game statistics	Bears
12	First downs	19
26–75	Rushes–yards	28–120
168	Passing yards	206
18–31–1	Passes	17–41–3
0–0	Sacked–yards	1–7
68	Net passing yards	199
243	Total yards	319
114	Return yards	98
5–44.2	Punts	5–40.2
1–0	Fumbles–lost	1–0
9–60	Penalties–yards	6–32
27:37	Time of possession	32:23

Individual stats

Redskins Passing
	C/ATT^{1}	Yds	TD	INT	Sk	Yds	LG^{3}	Rate
Rypien	18/31	168	2	1	0	0	26	81.1

Redskins Rushing
	Car^{2}	Yds	TD	LG^{3}
Byner	21	63	0	15
Monk	1	5	0	5
Riggs	2	4	0	4
Sanders	1	2	0	2
Rypien	1	1	0	1

Redskins Receiving
	Rec^{4}	Yds	TD	LG^{3}
Monk	6	69	2	26
Clark	5	44	0	15
Sanders	4	38	0	13
Byner	3	17	0	6

Redskins Kicking
	FGM–FGA	XPM–XPA
Lohmiller	2–3	2–2

- Missed Field Goals: Lohmiller 54

Redskins Punting
	Pnt	Yds	Y/P	Lng	Blck
Goodburn	5	221	44.2	61	

Redskins Kick Returns
	Ret	Yds	Y/Rt	TD	Lng
Mitchell	2	43	21.5	0	0

Redskins Punt Returns
	Ret	Yds	Y/Rt	TD	Lng
Mitchell	4	39	9.8	0	0
Hobbs	1	10	10.0	0	0

Redskins Sacks
	Sacks
Collins	1.0

Redskins Interceptions
	Int	Yds	TD	LG	PD
Gouveia	1	22	0	22	
Marshall	1	0	0	0	
Stokes	1	0	0	0	

==== Week 7 ====
Week 7: Cleveland Browns at Washington Redskins

Quarter	1	2	3	4	Total
Browns	7	0	10	0	**17**
**Redskins**	7	14	7	14	**42**

at RFK Stadium • Washington, D.C.

- Date: October 13, 1991
- Game time: 1:00 p.m. EDT
- Game weather: Clear; 55 °F (13 °C)
- Game attendance: 54,715
- Referee: Tom Dooley
- TV announcers (NBC): Charlie Jones (play-by-play) and Todd Christensen (color commentator)
- Pro-Football-Reference.com

Game information

Browns

- Bernie Kosar
  21/29, 266 Yds
- Kevin Mack
  14 Rush, 70 Yds
- Kevin Mack
  6 Rec, 53 Yds

Redskins

- Mark Rypien
  16/22, 190 Yds, TD
- Ricky Ervins
  13 Rush, 133 Yds, 2 TD
- Art Monk
  7 Rec, 106 Yds, TD

Scoring summary

Quarter	Time	Drive			Team	Scoring information	Score	
Quarter	Time	Plays	Yards	TOP	Team	Scoring information	CLE	WSH
1	3:33				Redskins	Monk 14-yard touchdown reception from Rypien, Lohmiller kick good	0	7
1	0:25				Browns	Slaughter 11-yard touchdown reception from Hansen, Stover kick good	7	7
2	11:29				Redskins	Riggs 1-yard touchdown run, Lohmiller kick good	7	14
2	4:14				Redskins	Byner 21-yard touchdown run, Lohmiller kick good	7	21
3	8:25				Browns	26-yard field goal by Stover	10	21
3	8:07	—	—	—	Browns	Fumble recovery returned 37 yards for touchdown by Newsome, Stover kick good	17	21
3	5:09				Redskins	Ervins 12-yard touchdown run, Lohmiller kick good	17	28
4	8:10				Redskins	Riggs 1-yard touchdown run, Lohmiller kick good	17	35
4	6:48				Redskins	Ervins 65-yard touchdown run, Lohmiller kick good	17	42
"TOP" = time of possession. For other American football terms, see Glossary of American football.							17	42

==== Week 9 ====
Week 9: Washington Redskins at New York Giants

Quarter	1	2	3	4	Total
**Redskins**	0	0	7	10	**17**
Giants	10	3	0	0	**13**

at Giants Stadium • East Rutherford, New Jersey

- Date: October 27, 1991
- Game time: 7:30 p.m. EST
- Game weather: Partly cloudy; 64 °F (18 °C); wind 9
- Game attendance: 76,627
- Referee: Jerry Markbreit
- TV announcers (ESPN): Mike Patrick (play-by-play) and Joe Theismann (color commentator)
- Pro-Football-Reference.com

Game information

Redskins

- Mark Rypien
  12/25, 159 Yds, 2 TD, INT
- Ricky Ervins
  20 Rush, 82 Yds
- Gary Clark
  3 Rec, 70 Yds, 2 TD

Giants

- Jeff Hostetler
  14/21, 137 Yds, INT
- Rodney Hampton
  21 Rush, 83 Yds, TD
- Rodney Hampton
  6 Red, 39 Yds

Scoring summary

Quarter	Time	Drive			Team	Scoring information	Score	
Quarter	Time	Plays	Yards	TOP	Team	Scoring information	WSH	NYG
1	8:35				Giants	26-yard field goal by Allegre	0	3
1	1:20				Giants	Hampton 1-yard touchdown run, Allegre kick good	0	10
2	1:40				Giants	36-yard field goal by Allegre	0	13
3	0:42				Redskins	Clark 7-yard touchdown reception from Rypien, Lohmiller kick good	7	13
4	12:50				Redskins	Clark 54-yard touchdown reception from Rypien, Lohmiller kick good	14	13
4	0:51				Redskins	35-yard field goal by Lohmiller	17	13
"TOP" = time of possession. For other American football terms, see Glossary of American football.							17	13

==== Week 10 ====
Week 10: Houston Oilers at Washington Redskins

Quarter	1	2	3	4	OT	Total
Oilers	0	6	0	7	0	**13**
**Redskins**	0	3	3	7	3	**16**

at RFK Stadium • Washington, D.C.

- Date: November 3, 1991
- Game time: 1:00 p.m. EST
- Game weather: Cloudy; 48 °F (9 °C)
- Game attendance: 55,096
- Referee: Gerry Austin
- TV announcers (NBC): Marv Albert (play-by-play) and Paul Maguire (color commentator)
- Pro-Football-Reference.com

Game information

Oilers

- Warren Moon
  25/44, 250 Yds, 2 INT
- Lorenzo White
  11 Rush, 14 Yds, TD
- Drew Hill
  9 Rec, 83 Yds

Redskins

- Mark Rypien
  21/34, 195 Yds, INT
- Earnest Byner
  21 Rush, 112 Yds, TD
- Art Monk
  8 Rec, 62 Yds

Scoring summary

Quarter	Time	Drive			Team	Scoring information	Score	
Quarter	Time	Plays	Yards	TOP	Team	Scoring information	HOU	WSH
2	14:12				Redskins	21-yard field goal by Lohmiller	0	3
2	2:00				Oilers	24-yard field goal by Howfield	3	3
2	0:03				Oilers	23-yard field goal by Howfield	6	3
3	0:20				Redskins	20-yard field goal by Lohmiller	6	6
4	14:10				Redskins	Byner 23-yard touchdown run, Lohmiller kick good	6	13
4	1:42				Oilers	White 1-yard touchdown run, Howfield kick good	13	13
OT	10:59				Redskins	41-yard field goal by Lohmiller	13	16
"TOP" = time of possession. For other American football terms, see Glossary of American football.							13	16

=== Week 11 (Sunday, November 10, 1991): vs. Atlanta Falcons ===
Week 11: Atlanta Falcons at Washington Redskins – Game summary

Quarter	1	2	3	4	Total
Falcons (5–5)	3	0	14	0	**17**
Redskins (10–0)	7	21	7	21	**56**

at RFK Stadium • Washington, D.C.

- Date: November 10, 1991
- Game time: 1:00 p.m. EST
- Game weather: Cloudy; 40 °F (4 °C), relative humidity 75%, wind 17 miles per hour (27 km/h; 15 kn)
- Game attendance: 52,641
- Referee: Dale Hamer
- TV announcers (CBS): James Brown (play-by-play), Randy Cross (color commentator) and Lesley Visser (sideline reporter)

Team	Category	Player	Statistics
ATL	Passing	Billy Joe Tolliver	14/31, 243 YDS, 2 TDs, INT
ATL	Rushing	Mike Rozier	11 CAR, 45 YDS
ATL	Receiving	Andre Rison	7 REC, 72 YDS, TD
WSH	Passing	Mark Rypien	16/31, 442 YDS, 6 TDs
WSH	Rushing	Ricky Ervins	16 CAR, 39 YDS
WSH	Receiving	Art Monk	7 REC, 164 YDS, 2 TDs

Scoring summary

Quarter	Time	Drive			Team	Scoring information	Score	
Quarter	Time	Plays	Yards	TOP	Team	Scoring information	ATL	WSH
1	9:52				Falcons	31-yard field goal by Johnson	3	0
1	5:43				Redskins	Orr 9-yard touchdown reception from Rypien, Lohmiller kick good	3	7
2	7:28				Redskins	Clark 61-yard touchdown reception from Rypien, Lohmiller kick good	3	14
2	1:55				Redskins	Rypien 4-yard touchdown run, Lohmiller kick good	3	21
2	0:37				Redskins	Clark 19-yard touchdown reception from Rypien, Lohmiller kick good	3	28
3	14:41				Falcons	Haynes 75-yard touchdown reception from Tolliver, Johnson kick good	10	28
3	12:18				Falcons	Rison 15-yard touchdown reception from Tolliver, Johnson kick good	17	28
3	10:13				Redskins	Monk 19-yard touchdown reception from Rypien, Lohmiller kick good	17	35
4	12:12				Redskins	Clark 82-yard touchdown reception from Rypien, Lohmiller kick good	17	42
4	10:00				Redskins	Monk 64-yard touchdown reception from Rypien, Lohmiller kick good	17	49
4	0:52				Redskins	Interception returned 15 yards for touchdown by Collins, Lohmiller kick good	17	56
"TOP" = time of possession. For other American football terms, see Glossary of American football.							17	56

- Point spread: Redskins –12
- Over/under: 35.0 **(over)**
- Time of game: 3 hours, 30 minutes

Falcons	Game statistics	Redskins
12	First downs	20
18–62	Rushes–yards	36–108
243	Passing yards	451
14–35–3	Passes	17–32–0
6–34	Sacked–yards	0–0
209	Net passing yards	451
271	Total yards	559
164	Return yards	134
7–40.0	Punts	5–36.0
3–3	Fumbles–lost	0–0
6–40	Penalties–yards	6–56
25:44	Time of possession	34:16

Individual stats

Redskins Passing
	C/ATT^{1}	Yds	TD	INT	Sk	Yds	LG^{3}	Rate
Rypien	16/31	442	6	0	0	0	82	136.8
Rutledge	1/1	9	0	0	0	0	9	104.2

Redskins Rushing
	Car^{2}	Yds	TD	LG^{3}
Ervins	16	39	0	12
Byner	12	33	0	5
Riggs	6	29	0	29
Rypien	1	4	0	4
Monk	1	3	0	3

Redskins Receiving
	Rec^{4}	Yds	TD	LG^{3}
Monk	7	164	2	64
Clark	4	203	3	82
Sanders	3	29	0	11
Orr	2	46	1	37
Hobbs	1	9	0	9

Redskins Kicking
	FGM–FGA	XPM–XPA
Lohmiller	0–1	8–8

- Missed Field Goals: Lohmiller 48

Redskins Punting
	Pnt	Yds	Y/P	Lng	Blck
Goodburn	5	180	36.0	39	

Redskins Kick Returns
	Ret	Yds	Y/Rt	TD	Lng
Mitchell	4	97	24.3	0	0

Redskins Punt Returns
	Ret	Yds	Y/Rt	TD	Lng
Mitchell	2	17	8.5	0	

Redskins Sacks
	Sacks
Geathers	1.5
Johnson	1.5
Wilson	1.5
Marshall	1.0
Stokes	0.5

Redskins Interceptions
	Int	Yds	TD	LG	PD
Collins	1	15	1	15	
Johnson	1	5	0	5	
Mays	1	0	0	0	

==== Week 12 ====
Team	1	2	3	4	Total
• Redskins	7	10	10	14	41
Steelers	0	0	0	14	14

- Date: November 17
- Location: Three Rivers Stadium
- Game start: 1:00 p.m. EST
- Game attendance: 56,813
- Game weather: Clear; 47 °F (8 °C)
- Referee: Tom White
- TV announcers (CBS): Dick Stockton and Merlin Olsen

==== Week 13 ====
Team	1	2	3	4	Total
• Cowboys	0	14	0	10	24
Redskins	7	0	0	14	21

- Date: November 24
- Location: Robert F. Kennedy Memorial Stadium
- Game start: 1:00 p.m. EST
- Game attendance: 55,561
- Game weather: Clear; 52 °F (11 °C)
- Referee: Bob McElwee
- TV announcers (CBS): Pat Summerall and John Madden

==== Week 14 ====
Team	1	2	3	4	Total
• Redskins	7	0	14	6	27
Rams	3	3	0	0	6

- Date: December 1
- Location: Anaheim Stadium
- Game start: 4:00 p.m. EST
- Game attendance: 55,027
- Game weather: Clear; 55 °F (13 °C)
- Referee: Dick Hantak
- TV announcers (CBS): Dick Stockton and Merlin Olsen

==== Week 15 ====
Team	1	2	3	4	Total
• Redskins	0	0	14	6	20
Cardinals	0	14	0	0	14

- Date: December 8
- Location: Sun Devil Stadium
- Game start: 4:00 p.m. EST
- Game attendance: 48,373
- Game weather: Partly cloudy; 60 °F (16 °C)
- Referee: Bernie Kukar
- TV announcers (CBS): Verne Lundquist and Dan Fouts

==== Week 16 ====
Team	1	2	3	4	Total
Giants	3	7	7	0	17
• Redskins	7	17	3	7	34

- Date: December 15
- Location: Robert F. Kennedy Memorial Stadium
- Game start: 4:00 p.m. EST
- Game attendance: 54,722
- Game weather: Partly cloudy; 40 °F (4 °C)
- Referee: Pat Haggerty
- TV announcers (CBS): Pat Summerall and John Madden

==== Week 17 ====
Team	1	2	3	4	Total
Redskins	3	10	3	6	22
• Eagles	7	0	0	17	24

- Date: December 22
- Location: Veterans Stadium
- Game start: 4:00 p.m. EST
- Game attendance: 58,988
- Game weather: Clear; 37 °F (3 °C)
- Referee: Dale Hamer
- TV announcers (CBS): Verne Lundquist and Dan Fouts

=== Standings ===
NFC East
	W	L	T	PCT	DIV	CONF	PF	PA	STK
^{(1)} Washington Redskins	14	2	0	.875	6–2	10–2	485	224	L1
^{(5)} Dallas Cowboys	11	5	0	.688	5–3	8–4	342	310	W5
Philadelphia Eagles	10	6	0	.625	5–3	6–6	285	244	W1
New York Giants	8	8	0	.500	3–5	5–7	281	297	W1
Phoenix Cardinals	4	12	0	.250	1–7	3–11	196	344	L8

== Playoffs ==
=== Schedule ===
Week	Date	Opponent (seed)	Result	Record	Venue	Recap
Divisional	January 4	Atlanta Falcons (6)	W 24–7	1–0	Robert F. Kennedy Memorial Stadium	Recap
Championship	January 12	Detroit Lions (2)	W 41–10	2–0	Robert F. Kennedy Memorial Stadium	Recap
Super Bowl XXVI	January 26	Buffalo Bills (A1)	W 37–24	3–0	Hubert H. Humphrey Metrodome	Recap

=== NFC Divisional Playoffs (January 4, 1992): vs. (6) Atlanta Falcons ===
NFC Divisional Playoffs: Atlanta Falcons at Washington Redskins – Game summary

Quarter	1	2	3	4	Total
Falcons (1–1)	0	7	0	0	7
Redskins (1–0)	0	14	3	7	24

at RFK Stadium • Washington, D.C.

- Date: January 4, 1992 (Sat)
- Game time: 12:30 p.m. EST
- Game weather: Heavy rain with strong winds; 49 °F (9 °C), relative humidity 94%, wind 25 miles per hour (40 km/h; 22 kn)
- Game attendance: 55,181
- Referee: Red Cashion
- TV announcers (CBS): Verne Lundquist (play-by-play), Dan Fouts (color commentator) and Lesley Visser (sideline reporter)

Team	Category	Player	Statistics
ATL	Passing	Chris Miller	17/32, 178 YDS, 4 INTs
ATL	Rushing	Tracy Johnson	8 CAR, 33 YDS, TD
ATL	Receiving	Andre Rison	7 REC, 62 YDS
WSH	Passing	Mark Rypien	14/29, 170 YDS, INT
WSH	Rushing	Ricky Ervins	23 CAR, 104 YDSds, TD
WSH	Receiving	Gary Clark	6 REC, 64 YDS

Scoring summary

Quarter	Time	Drive			Team	Scoring information	Score	
Quarter	Time	Plays	Yards	TOP	Team	Scoring information	ATL	WSH
2	12:36				Redskins	Ervins 17-yard touchdown run, Lohmiller kick good	0	7
2	9:25				Redskins	Riggs 2-yard touchdown run, Lohmiller kick good	0	14
2	0:57				Falcons	Johnson 1-yard touchdown run, Johnson kick good	7	14
3	6:54				Redskins	24-yard field goal by Lohmiller	7	17
4	6:32				Redskins	Riggs 1-yard touchdown run, Lohmiller kick good	7	24
"TOP" = time of possession. For other American football terms, see Glossary of American football.							7	24

- Point spread: Redskins –11½
- Over/under: 43.0 (under)
- Time of game: 3 hours, 5 minutes

Falcons	Game statistics	Redskins
12	First downs	22
14–43	Rushes–yards	45–162
178	Passing yards	170
17–32–4	Passes	14–29–1
4–28	Sacked–yards	0–0
150	Net passing yards	170
193	Total yards	332
107	Return yards	106
4–42.2	Punts	4–38.8
3–2	Fumbles–lost	0–0
3–19	Penalties–yards	4–23
23:52	Time of possession	36:08

Individual stats

Redskins Passing
	C/ATT^{1}	Yds	TD	INT	Sk	Yds	LG^{3}	Rate
Rypien	14/29	170	0	1	0	0	26	52.4

Redskins Rushing
	Car^{2}	Yds	TD	LG^{3}
Ervins	23	104	1	17
Byner	14	57	0	13
Riggs	4	7	2	2
Monk	1	–2	0	–2
Rypien	3	–4	0	–1

Redskins Receiving
	Rec^{4}	Yds	TD	LG^{3}
Clark	6	64	0	19
Monk	3	45	0	19
Ervins	3	24	0	11
Sanders	1	26	0	26
Byner	1	11	0	11

Redskins Kicking
	FGM–FGA	XPM–XPA
Lohmiller	1–4	3–3

- Missed Field Goals: Lohmiller 47, 37, 44

Redskins Punting
	Pnt	Yds	Y/P	Lng	Blck
Goodburn	4	155	38.8	44	

Redskins Kick Returns
	Ret	Yds	Y/Rt	TD	Lng
Mitchell	2	51	25.5	0	35

Redskins Punt Returns
	Ret	Yds	Y/Rt	TD	Lng
Mitchell	3	28	9.3	0	26

Redskins Sacks
	Sacks
Stokes	2.0
Coleman	1.0
Johnson	1.0

Redskins Interceptions
	Int	Yds	TD	LG	PD
Copeland	1	19	0	19	
Gouveia	1	6	0	6	
Mayhew	1	2	0	2	
Coleman	1	0	0	0	

==== NFC Championship Game: vs Detroit Lions ====
NFC Championship Game: Detroit Lions vs Washington Redskins

Quarter	1	2	3	4	Total
Lions	0	10	0	0	10
Redskins	10	7	10	14	41

at RFK Stadium • Washington, D.C.

- Date: January 12 (Sun)
- Game time: 4 p.m. EST
- Game weather: Clear skies; 40 °F (4 °C)
- Game attendance: 55,858
- Referee: Bob McElwee
- TV announcers: Pat Summerall (play-by-play), John Madden (color commentator)
- Box Score

Scoring summary

Quarter	Time	Drive			Team	Scoring information	Score	
Quarter	Time	Plays	Yards	TOP	Team	Scoring information	DET	WSH
1	13:54				WSH	Gerald Riggs 2-yard touchdown run, Chip Lohmiller kick good	0	7
1	11:58				WSH	20-yard field goal by Chip Lohmiller	0	10
2	12:35				DET	Willie Green 18-yard touchdown reception from Erik Kramer, Eddie Murray kick good	7	10
2	7:44				WSH	Gerald Riggs 3-yard touchdown run, Chip Lohmiller kick good	7	17
2	0:37				DET	30-yard field goal by Eddie Murray	10	17
3	11:52				WAS	28-yard field goal by Chip Lohmiller	10	20
3	2:23				WSH	Gary Clark 45-yard touchdown reception from Mark Rypien, Chip Lohmiller kick good	10	27
4	10:45				WSH	Art Monk 21-yard touchdown reception from Mark Rypien, Chip Lohmiller kick good	10	34
4	10:11				WSH	Interception returned 32 yards for touchdown by Darrell Green, Chip Lohmiller kick good	10	41
"TOP" = time of possession. For other American football terms, see Glossary of American football.							10	41

=== Super Bowl XXVI (Sunday, January 26, 1992): vs. (A1) Buffalo Bills ===
Super Bowl XXVI: Washington Redskins vs. Buffalo Bills – Game summary

Quarter	1	2	3	4	Total
Redskins (3–0)	0	17	14	6	37
Bills (2–1)	0	0	10	14	24

at Hubert H. Humphrey Metrodome • Minneapolis, Minnesota

- Date: January 26, 1992
- Game time: 6:18 pm. EST
- Game weather: Played indoors, domed stadium
- Referee: Jerry Markbreit
- TV announcers (CBS): Pat Summerall (play-by-play), John Madden (color commentator), and Lesley Visser (sideline reporter)

Team	Category	Player	Statistics
WSH	Passing	Mark Rypien	18/33, 292 YDS, 2 TDs, 1 INT
WSH	Rushing	Ricky Ervins	13 CAR, 72 YDS
WSH	Receiving	Gary Clark; Art Monk	7 Rec, 114 YDS, 1 TD; 7 Rec, 113 YDS
BUF	Passing	Jim Kelly	28/58, 275 YDS, 2 TDs, 4 INTs
BUF	Rushing	Kenneth Davis	4 CAR, 17 YDS
BUF	Receiving	James Lofton	7 REC, 92 YDS

Scoring summary

Quarter	Time	Drive			Team	Scoring information	Score	
Quarter	Time	Plays	Yards	TOP	Team	Scoring information	WSH	BUF
2	13:02	7	64	2:40	Redskins	34-yard field goal by Chip Lohmiller	3	0
2	9:54	5	51	2:12	Redskins	Earnest Byner 10-yard touchdown reception from Mark Rypien, Chip Lohmiller kick good	10	0
2	7:17	5	55	2:18	Redskins	Gerald Riggs 1-yard touchdown run, Chip Lohmiller kick good	17	0
3	14:44	1	2	0:03	Redskins	Gerald Riggs 2-yard touchdown run, Chip Lohmiller kick good	24	0
3	11:59	11	77	2:45	Bills	21-yard field goal by Scott Norwood	24	3
3	5:58	6	56	2:19	Bills	Thurman Thomas 1-yard touchdown run, Scott Norwood kick good	24	10
3	1:24	11	79	4:34	Redskins	Gary Clark 30-yard touchdown reception from Mark Rypien, Chip Lohmiller kick good	31	10
4	14:54	4	7	0:57	Redskins	25-yard field goal by Chip Lohmiller	34	10
4	11:36	5	11	2:30	Redskins	39-yard field goal by Chip Lohmiller	37	10
4	5:59	15	79	5:37	Bills	Pete Metzelaars 2-yard touchdown reception from Jim Kelly, Scott Norwood kick good	37	17
4	3:55	9	50	2:04	Bills	Don Beebe 4-yard touchdown reception from Jim Kelly, Scott Norwood kick good	37	24
"TOP" = time of possession. For other American football terms, see Glossary of American football.							37	24

- Point spread: Redskins –7
- Over/under: 48.0 (over)
- Time of game: 3 hours, 42 minutes

Redskins	Game statistics	Bills
24	First downs	25
40–125	Rushes–yards	18–43
292	Passing yards	286
17–32–4	Passes	14–29–1
0–0	Sacked–yards	5–46
292	Net passing yards	240
417	Total yards	283
95	Return yards	90
4–37.5	Punts	6–35.0
1–0	Fumbles–lost	6–1
5–82	Penalties–yards	6–50
33:43	Time of possession	26:17

Individual stats

Redskins Passing
	C/ATT^{1}	Yds	TD	INT	Sk	Yds	LG^{3}	Rate
Rypien	18/33	292	2	1	0	0	41	92.0

Redskins Rushing
	Car^{2}	Yds	TD	LG^{3}
Ervins	13	72	0	21
Byner	14	49	0	19
Riggs	5	7	2	4
Sanders	1	1	0	1
Rutledge	1	0	0	0
Rypien	6	–4	0	2

Redskins Receiving
	Rec^{4}	Yds	TD	LG^{3}
Clark	7	114	1	34
Monk	7	113	0	31
Byner	3	24	1	10
Sanders	1	41	0	41

Redskins Kicking
	FGM–FGA	XPM–XPA
Lohmiller	3–3	4–4

Redskins Punting
	Pnt	Yds	Y/P	Lng	Blck
Goodburn	4	150	37.5	45	

Redskins Kick Returns
	Ret	Yds	Y/Rt	TD	Lng
Mitchell	1	16	16.0	0	16

Redskins Sacks
	Sacks
Buck	1.0
Geathers	1.0
Marshall	1.0
Mays	1.0
Stokes	1.0

Redskins Interceptions
	Int	Yds	TD	LG	PD
Edwards	2	56	0	35	
Gouveia	1	23	0	23	
Green	1	0	0	0	

== Statistics ==
=== Passing ===
Player	G	Comp.	Att.	Pct.	Yds.	TD	INT
Mark Rypien	16	249	421	59.1	3,564	28	11
Jeff Rutledge	16	11	22	50.0	189	1	0

=== Rushing ===
Player	G	Att.	Yards	Avg.	TD
Earnest Byner	16	274	1,048	3.8	5
Ricky Ervins	15	145	680	4.7	3
Gerald Riggs	16	78	248	3.2	11

=== Receiving ===
Player	G	Rec.	Yards	Y/G	Avg.	TD
Art Monk	16	71	1,049	65.6	14.8	8
Gary Clark	16	70	1,340	83.8	19.1	10
Ricky Sanders	16	45	580	36.3	12.9	5
Earnest Byner	16	34	308	19.3	9.1	0
Ricky Ervins	16	16	181	11.3	11.3	1
Terry Orr	16	10	201	12.6	20.1	4

=== Kicking ===
Player	FGM	FGA	Pct.	XPM	XPA	Pct.
Chip Lohmiller	31	43	72.1	56	56	100.0

== Awards and records ==
- Mark Rypien, Super Bowl Most Valuable Player
- Mark Rypien, UPI NFC Player of the Year
- Mark Rypien, Pro Bowl Selection

=== Milestones ===
- November 10, 1991 – Mark Rypien threw for 442 yards and 6 touchdowns against the Atlanta Falcons, despite being taken out of the game in the middle of the 4th quarter; when Atlanta did the same, their third-string quarterback, a rookie named Brett Favre, made his NFL debut – and his first pass was intercepted and returned for a touchdown. On that same day, Warren Moon of the Houston Oilers threw for over 400 yards as well in an overtime win over the Dallas Cowboys.

=== Legacy ===
In 2010, ESPN conducted a "super league," consisting of the best Super Bowl winning teams of all time; the 1991 Redskins finished the regular season in first place with a record of 14-2 and beat the 1992 Dallas Cowboys in the "Super Bowl" to be named the greatest team of all time. Football Outsiders also has them ranked as the best Super Bowl-winning team in NFL history based on their advanced analysis.
