= 1993 Washington Redskins season =

NFL team season

- Owner: Jack Kent Cooke
- General manager: Charley Casserly
- President: John Kent Cooke
- Head coach: Richie Petitbon
- Offensive coordinator: Rod Dowhower
- Defensive coordinator: Emmitt Thomas
- Home stadium: RFK Stadium

Results
- Record: 4–12
- Division place: 5th NFC East
- Playoffs: Did not qualify
- Pro Bowlers: None

The 1993 Washington Redskins season was the franchise's 62nd season in the National Football League (NFL) and their 57th in Washington, D.C. The team failed to improve on their 9–7 record from 1992. Head coach Joe Gibbs retired following the 1992 season and named defensive coordinator since 1981, Richie Petitbon, as his successor. The Redskins’ aging core struggled with injuries while numerous key players (Gary Clark, Wilber Marshall, Martin Mayhew, Jumpy Geathers, and Fred Stokes) left the team via free agency. Management tried to ease the losses by signing players like Carl Banks, Tim McGee, Al Noga, and Rick Graf, but none had a major impact on the team. The team finished the season with a 4–12 record and missed the playoffs for the first time since 1989. Petitbon was fired at the end of the season.

The Redskins were swept by the Cardinals for the first time since 1974, losing to the Cardinals at RFK Stadium for the first time since 1978. Until 2023, the season was the only in franchise history that saw no players selected to the Pro Bowl.

== Offseason ==
=== Draft ===
1993 draft selections
Round	Selection	Player	Position	College
1	17	Tom Carter	Cornerback	Notre Dame
2	45	Reggie Brooks	Running back	Notre Dame
3	71	Rick Hamilton	Linebacker	UCF
3	80	Ed Bunn	Punter	Texas-El Paso
4	101	Sterling Palmer	Defensive end	Florida State
5	128	Greg Huntington	Center	Penn State
6	155	Darryl Morrison	Safety	Arizona
6	160	Frank Wycheck	Tight end	Maryland
8	212	Lamont Hollinquest	Linebacker	USC

== Roster ==
1993 Washington Redskins roster
Quarterbacks (QB): 12 Cary Conklin; 16 Rich Gannon; 11 Mark Rypien; Running backs (RB): 40 Reggie Brooks; 21 Earnest Byner; 32 Ricky Ervins; 30 Brian Mitchell; Wide receivers (WR): 31 Gregory Clifton; 80 Desmond Howard; 85 Tim McGee; 81 Art Monk; 83 Ricky Sanders; 84 Mark Stock; Tight ends (TE): 87 Ron Middleton; 89 Terry Orr; 82 Ray Rowe; 36 Frank Wycheck	Offensive linemen (OL): 53 Jeff Bostic C; 65 Ray Brown G/T; 64 Mo Elewonibi T; 60 Greg Huntington C/G; 63 Raleigh McKenzie C/G; 62 Darryl Moore G; 74 Paul Siever T; 76 Ed Simmons T; 61 Vernice Smith G; Defensive linemen (DL): 99 Jason Buck DE/DT; 93 Jeff Faulkner DT; 95 Martin Hochertz DE; 78 Tim Johnson DT; 71 Charles Mann DE; 72 Al Noga DE; 97 Sterling Palmer DE; 94 Bobby Wilson DT	Linebackers (LB): 58 Carl Banks OLB; 51 Monte Coleman OLB; 55 Andre Collins OLB; 54 Kurt Gouveia MLB; 90 Rick Graf OLB; 56 Rick Hamilton MLB; 96 Lamont Hollinquest OLB; Defensive backs (DB): 22 Todd Bowles SS; 25 Tom Carter CB; 26 Danny Copeland SS; 27 Brad Edwards FS; 28 Darrell Green CB; 47 A. J. Johnson CB; 20 Alvoid Mays CB; 37 Darryl Morrison FS; 41 Johnny Thomas CB; Special teams (ST): 8 Chip Lohmiller K; 50 Marc Raab LS; 1 Reggie Roby P	Practice squad: 35 Tico Duckett RB; 73 Guy Earle G; Reserve: 57 Guy Bingham LS (IR); 59 John Brantley LB (IR); 91 Shane Collins DE (IR); 24 Pat Eilers S (IR); 52 Matt Elliott C/G (IR); -- Tom Fuhler DT (IR); 86 Stephen Hobbs WR (IR); 66 Joe Jacoby T (IR); 88 James Jenkins TE (IR); 79 Jim Lachey T (IR); 69 Mark Schlereth G (NF-Inj.); 77 Jim Wahler DT (IR); 75 Eric Williams DT (IR); 53 active, 13 inactive, 2 practice squad Rookies in italics

== Schedule ==
Week	Date	Opponent	Result	Record	Venue	Attendance	Game recap
1	September 6	**Dallas Cowboys**	**W** 35–16	1–0	RFK Stadium	56,345	Recap
2	September 12	**Phoenix Cardinals**	**L** 10–17	1–1	RFK Stadium	53,525	Recap
3	September 19	at **Philadelphia Eagles**	**L** 31–34	1–2	Veterans Stadium	65,435	Recap
4	Bye						
5	October 4	at Miami Dolphins	**L** 10–17	1–3	Joe Robbie Stadium	68,568	Recap
6	October 10	**New York Giants**	**L** 7–41	1–4	RFK Stadium	53,715	Recap
7	October 17	at **Phoenix Cardinals**	**L** 6–36	1–5	Sun Devil Stadium	48,143	Recap
8	Bye						
9	November 1	at Buffalo Bills	**L** 10–24	1–6	Rich Stadium	79,106	Recap
10	November 7	Indianapolis Colts	**W** 30–24	2–6	RFK Stadium	50,523	Recap
11	November 14	at **New York Giants**	**L** 6–20	2–7	Giants Stadium	76,606	Recap
12	November 21	at Los Angeles Rams	**L** 6–10	2–8	Anaheim Stadium	45,546	Recap
13	November 28	**Philadelphia Eagles**	**L** 14–17	2–9	RFK Stadium	46,663	Recap
14	December 5	at Tampa Bay Buccaneers	**W** 23–17	3–9	Tampa Stadium	49,035	Recap
15	December 11	New York Jets	**L** 0–3	3–10	RFK Stadium	47,970	Recap
16	December 19	Atlanta Falcons	**W** 30–17	4–10	RFK Stadium	50,192	Recap
17	December 26	at **Dallas Cowboys**	**L** 3–38	4–11	Texas Stadium	64,497	Recap
18	December 31	Minnesota Vikings	**L** 9–14	4–12	RFK Stadium	42,836	Recap

Note: Intra-division opponents are in bold text.

== Standings ==
NFC East
	W	L	T	PCT	PF	PA	STK
^{(1)} Dallas Cowboys	12	4	0	.750	376	229	W5
^{(4)} New York Giants	11	5	0	.688	288	205	L2
Philadelphia Eagles	8	8	0	.500	293	315	W3
Phoenix Cardinals	7	9	0	.438	326	269	W3
Washington Redskins	4	12	0	.250	230	345	L2
