= 1992 Minnesota Vikings season =

NFL team season

- Head coach: Dennis Green
- Offensive coordinator: Jack Burns
- Defensive coordinator: Tony Dungy
- Home stadium: Hubert H. Humphrey Metrodome

Results
- Record: 11–5
- Division place: 1st NFC Central
- Playoffs: Lost Wild Card Playoffs (vs. Redskins) 7–24
- All-Pros: DE Chris Doleman (1st team); G Randall McDaniel (1st team); CB Audray McMillian (1st team)
- Pro Bowlers: DE Chris Doleman; G Randall McDaniel; CB Audray McMillian; S Todd Scott; DT Henry Thomas; T Gary Zimmerman

Uniform
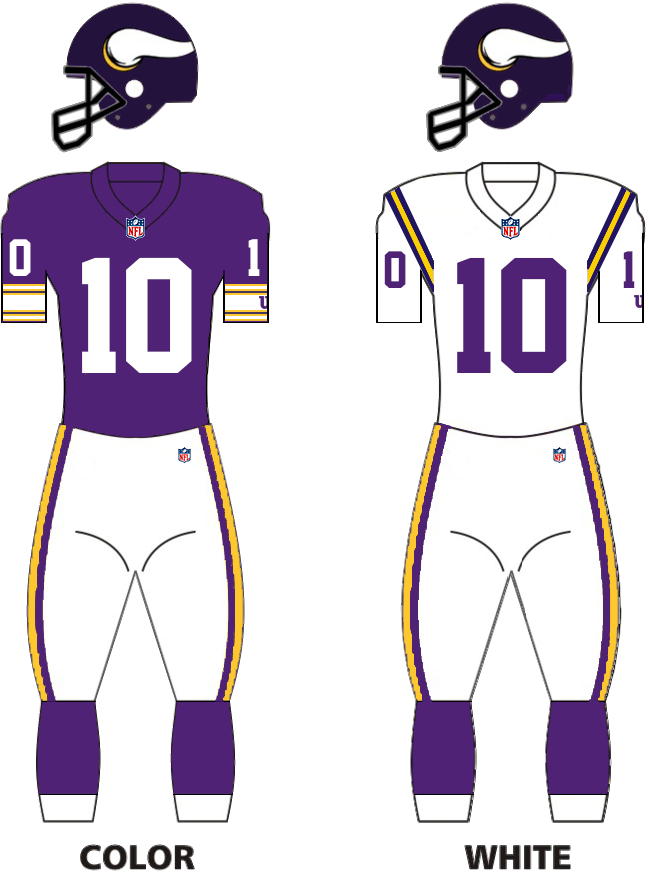

The 1992 season was the Minnesota Vikings' 32nd in the National Football League (NFL), and their first under head coach Dennis Green. They finished with an 11–5 record to claim the NFC Central division title and returned to the playoffs after a two-year absence. They met the defending Super Bowl champion Washington Redskins in the wildcard round, the teams' first playoff meeting since victory for the Redskins in the 1987 NFC Championship game; the Redskins won again this time, 24–7.

Minnesota's starting quarterbacks were Rich Gannon, who went 8–4 in 12 starts, and Sean Salisbury, who won three of his four starts. The team's leading rusher was Terry Allen, who ran for 1,201 yards. Receivers Cris Carter and Anthony Carter led the team with 681 and 580 receiving yards, respectively.

== Offseason ==
On January 10, 1992, Dennis Green was named the fifth head coach in franchise history.

Additions	Subtractions
RB Roger Craig (Raiders)	RB Herschel Walker (Eagles)
LB Jack Del Rio (Cowboys)	QB Wade Wilson (Falcons)
	S Joey Browner (Buccaneers)
	LB Jimmy Williams (Buccaneers)

=== 1992 draft ===
Pro Bowler

1992 Minnesota Vikings Draft
Draft order		Player name	Position	College	Notes
Round	Selection	Player name	Position	College	Notes
1	13	Traded to the Dallas Cowboys (Note: These picks were involved in the Herschel Walker trade on October 12, 1989.)			
2	39	Robert Harris	Defensive end	Southern	From Seahawks (Note: The Vikings traded DT Keith Millard to the Seahawks in exchange for a second-round selection (39th overall) and a 1993 third-round selection (57th overall).)
2	40	Traded to the Dallas Cowboys			
3	71	Traded to the Dallas Cowboys			
4	98	Roy Barker	Defensive tackle	North Carolina	
5	125	Ed McDaniel	Linebacker	Clemson	
6	152	Mike Gaddis	Running back	Oklahoma	
7	183	David Wilson	Defensive back	California	
8	210	Luke Fisher	Tight end	East Carolina	
9	227	Brad Johnson	Quarterback	Florida State	From Buccaneers (Note: The Vikings traded LB Jimmy Williams to the Buccaneers in exchange for a ninth-round selection (227th overall).)
9	237	Ronnie West	Wide receiver	Pittsburg State	
10	264	Brad Culpepper	Defensive tackle	Florida	
11	295	Chuck Evans	Running back	Clark Atlanta	
12	322	Joe Randolph	Wide receiver	Elon	

=== Undrafted free agents ===
1992 undrafted free agents of note
Player	Position	College
Roman Anderson	Placekicker	Houston
Brian Dahl	Linebacker	Morehead State (MN)
John Jett	Punter	East Carolina
Ed Sutter	Linebacker	Northwestern

== Staff ==
1992 Minnesota Vikings staff
Front office: Chairman of the Board – John Skoglund; President/Chief Executive Officer – Roger Headrick; Head coaches: Head Coach – Dennis Green; Offensive coaches: Offensive coordinator/Quarterbacks – Jack Burns; Running backs – Tyrone Willingham; Receivers – Tom Moore; Tight ends – Brian Billick; Offensive line – John Michels	Defensive coaches: Defensive coordinator – Tony Dungy; Defensive line – John Teerlinck; Inside linebackers – Monte Kiffin; Outside linebackers – Richard Solomon; Secondary – Willie Shaw; Special teams coaches: Special teams – Tom Batta; Strength and conditioning: Strength and conditioning – Steve Wetzel; Strength and conditioning assistant – Mike Wolf

== Roster ==
1992 Minnesota Vikings roster
Quarterbacks (QB): 16 Rich Gannon; 14 Brad Johnson; 12 Sean Salisbury; Running backs (RB): 21 Terry Allen; 33 Roger Craig; 30 Keith Henderson; 20 Darrin Nelson KR; Wide receivers (WR): 81 Anthony Carter; 89 Joe Johnson; 84 Hassan Jones; 86 Jake Reed; 35 Ronnie West; Tight ends (TE): 83 Steve Jordan; 85 Brent Novoselsky; 87 Mike Tice	Offensive linemen (OL): 72 Scott Adams T; 71 Bernard Dafney G; 74 Brian Habib G; 76 Tim Irwin T; 63 Kirk Lowdermilk C; 64 Randall McDaniel G; 68 Mike Morris; 60 Adam Schreiber G; 65 Gary Zimmerman T; Defensive linemen (DL): 92 Roy Barker DE; 56 Chris Doleman DE; 90 Robert Harris DE; 99 Al Noga DE; 93 John Randle DT; 97 Henry Thomas DT; 95 Esera Tuaolo DT	Linebackers (LB): 52 David Bavaro MLB; 55 Jack Del Rio MLB; 51 Carlos Jenkins OLB; 91 Greg Manusky MLB; 58 Ed McDaniel OLB; 57 Mike Merriweather OLB; 54 Van Waiters OLB; Defensive backs (DB): 31 Eric Everett CB; 25 Vencie Glenn FS; 39 Carl Lee CB; 26 Audray McMillian CB; 27 Anthony Parker; 38 Todd Scott SS; 24 David Wilson SS; Special teams (ST): 18 Harry Newsome P; 7 Fuad Reveiz K	Practice squad: 75 David Dixon G; 29 Chuck Evans RB; -- James Harris DE (IR); Reserve: 50 Ray Berry LB (IR); 80 Cris Carter WR (IR); 77 Brad Culpepper DT (IR); 43 Luke Fisher TE (IR); 78 Lorenzo Freeman DT (IR); -- Mike Gaddis RB (IR); 98 George Hinkle DE (NF-Ill.); 69 Todd Kalis G (IR); 48 Reggie Rutland CB; 32 Tripp Welborne S (IR); 22 Felix Wright S (IR); Rookies in italics 47 active, 12 reserve, 2 practice squad

== Preseason ==
Week	Date	Opponent	Result	Record	Venue	Attendance
1	August 8	Buffalo Bills	W 24–3	1–0	Hubert H. Humphrey Metrodome	36,603
2	August 15	Kansas City Chiefs	W 30–0	2–0	Hubert H. Humphrey Metrodome	38,132
3	August 24	at Cleveland Browns	W 56–3	3–0	Cleveland Stadium	35,755
4	August 29	at Washington Redskins	W 30–0	4–0	RFK Stadium	55,855

== Regular season ==
=== Schedule ===
Week	Date	Opponent	Result	Record	Venue	Attendance
1	September 6	at **Green Bay Packers**	**W** 23–20 (OT)	1–0	Lambeau Field	58,617
2	September 13	at **Detroit Lions**	**L** 31–17	1–1	Silverdome	57,519
3	September 20	**Tampa Bay Buccaneers**	**W** 26–20	2–1	Metrodome	48,113
4	September 27	at Cincinnati Bengals	**W** 42–7	3–1	Riverfront Stadium	53,847
5	October 4	**Chicago Bears**	**W** 21–20	4–1	Metrodome	60,992
6	Bye					
7	October 15	**Detroit Lions**	**W** 31–14	5–1	Metrodome	52,816
8	October 25	Washington Redskins	**L** 15–13	5–2	Metrodome	59,098
9	November 2	at **Chicago Bears**	**W** 38–10	6–2	Soldier Field	61,257
10	November 8	at **Tampa Bay Buccaneers**	**W** 35–7	7–2	Tampa Stadium	49,095
11	November 15	Houston Oilers	**L** 17–13	7–3	Metrodome	56,726
12	November 22	Cleveland Browns	**W** 17–13	8–3	Metrodome	53,323
13	November 29	at Los Angeles Rams	**W** 31–17	9–3	Anaheim Stadium	54,831
14	December 6	at Philadelphia Eagles	**L** 28–17	9–4	Veterans Stadium	65,280
15	December 13	San Francisco 49ers	**L** 20–17	9–5	Metrodome	60,685
16	December 20	at Pittsburgh Steelers	**W** 6–3	10–5	Three Rivers Stadium	53,613
17	December 27	**Green Bay Packers**	**W** 27–7	11–5	Metrodome	61,461

Note: Intra-division opponents are in bold text.

=== Season summary ===
==== Week 1: at Green Bay Packers ====
Week One: Minnesota Vikings at Green Bay Packers

Quarter	1	2	3	4	OT	Total
**Vikings**	0	10	3	7	3	**23**
Packers	7	3	0	10	0	**20**

at Lambeau Field, Green Bay, Wisconsin

- Date: September 13, 1992
- Game time: 12:00 p.m. CST
- Game weather: 68 °F (20 °C), wind 9 mph (14 km/h)
- TV announcers (CBS): Mike Emrick and Matt Millen

Game information

**First quarter**

**Second quarter**

**Third quarter**

**Fourth quarter**

Top passers

- MIN – Rich Gannon – 21/44, 266 yards, 2 TD, INT
- GB – Don Majkowski – 27/38, 189 yards, 2 TD, INT

Top rushers

- MIN – Terry Allen – 12 rushes, 140 yards
- GB – Vince Workman – 25 rushes, 89 yards

Top receivers

- MIN – Steve Jordan – 4 receptions, 77 yards
- GB – Sterling Sharpe – 8 receptions, 99 yards, TD

=== Standings ===
NFC Central
	W	L	T	PCT	DIV	CONF	PF	PA	STK
^{(3)} Minnesota Vikings	11	5	0	.688	7–1	8–4	374	249	W2
Green Bay Packers	9	7	0	.563	4–4	6–6	276	296	L1
Tampa Bay Buccaneers	5	11	0	.313	3–5	5–9	267	365	W1
Chicago Bears	5	11	0	.313	3–5	4–8	295	361	L2
Detroit Lions	5	11	0	.313	3–5	3–9	273	332	L1

== Postseason ==
=== Game summaries ===
==== NFC Wild Card Round: vs (#6) Washington Redskins ====
NFC Wild Card Round: (#6) Washington Redskins at (#3) Minnesota Vikings – Game summary

Quarter	1	2	3	4	Total
Redskins	3	14	7	0	24
Vikings	7	0	0	0	7

at Hubert H. Humphrey Metrodome, Minneapolis, Minnesota

- Date: January 2
- Game time: 11:30 a.m. CST/12:30 p.m. EST
- Game weather: None (indoor stadium)
- Game attendance: 57,353
- Referee: Gordon McCarter
- TV announcers (ABC): Al Michaels, Frank Gifford and Dan Dierdorf
- Recap, Game Book

Game information

First quarter

- MIN – Terry Allen 1-yard run (Fuad Reveiz kick), 10:05. Vikings 7–0. Drive: 9 plays, 79 yards, 4:55.
- WAS – Chip Lohmiller 44-yard field goal, 0:53. Vikings 7–3. Drive: 4 plays, 6 yards, 1:29.

Second quarter

- WAS – Earnest Byner 3-yard run (Chip Lohmiller kick), 9:23. Redskins 10–7. Drive: 6 plays, 33 yards, 1:42.
- WAS – Brian Mitchell 8-yard run (Chip Lohmiller kick), 1:56. Redskins 17–7. Drive: 10 plays, 86 yards, 5:07.

Third quarter

- WAS – Gary Clark 24-yard pass from Mark Rypien (Chip Lohmiller kick), 0:17. Redskins 24–7. Drive: 10 plays, 71 yards, 6:12.

Fourth quarter

- No scoring plays.

Top passers

- WAS – Mark Rypien – 16/24, 172 yards, TD, INT
- MIN – Sean Salisbury – 6/20, 113 yards, 2 INT

Top rushers

- WAS – Brian Mitchell – 16 rushes, 109 yards, TD
- MIN – Terry Allen – 10 rushes, 48 yards, TD

Top receivers

- WAS – Gary Clark – 6 receptions, 91 yards, TD
- MIN – Cris Carter – 3 receptions, 77 yards

This was the first postseason game the Vikings lost in the Metrodome.

== Statistics ==
=== Team leaders ===
Category	Player(s)	Value
Passing yards	Rich Gannon	1,905
Passing touchdowns	Rich Gannon	12
Rushing yards	Terry Allen	1,201
Rushing touchdowns	Terry Allen	13
Receiving yards	Cris Carter	681
Receiving touchdowns	Cris Carter	6
Points	Fuad Reveiz	102
Kickoff return yards	Darrin Nelson	626
Punt return yards	Anthony Parker	336
Tackles	Jack Del Rio	153
Sacks	Chris Doleman	14.5
Interceptions	Audray McMillian	8
Forced fumbles	Chris Doleman	6

=== League rankings ===
Category	Total yards	Yards per game	NFL rank (out of 28)
Passing offense	2,869	179.3	18th
Rushing offense	2,030	126.9	7th
Total offense	4,899	306.2	11th
Passing defense	2,782	173.9	7th
Rushing defense	1,733	108.3	14th
Total defense	4,515	282.2	8th

== Awards and records ==
- Audrey MacMillan, NFL leader, interceptions (8)
