= Goodburn =

Goodburn is a surname of English origin. People with that name include:

- Archie Goodburn (born 2001), Scottish swimmer
- Glynis Penny (née Goodburn, born 1951), English retired female long-distance runner
- Kelly Goodburn (born 1962), former American football punter
- Thitisan Goodburn (born 1999), Thai model and pageant titleholder
