= Kelly Goodburn =

American football player (born 1962)

No. 2
- Position: Punter

Personal information
- Born: April 14, 1962 (age 64); Cherokee, Iowa, U.S.
- Listed height: 6 ft 2 in (1.88 m)
- Listed weight: 195 lb (88 kg)

Career information
- High school: Eastwood (Correctionville, Iowa)
- College: Iowa State (1980–1983); Emporia State (1984)
- NFL draft: 1985: undrafted

Career history
- Kansas City Chiefs (1986–1990); Washington Redskins (1990–1993)

Awards and highlights
- Super Bowl champion: (XXVI)

Career NFL statistics
- Punts: 351
- Punt yards: 14,011
- Punting yard average: 39.9
- Stats at Pro Football Reference

Kelly Joe Goodburn (born April 14, 1962) is an American former professional football player who was a punter for seven seasons in the National Football League (NFL). He played college football for the Iowa State Cyclones and Emporia State Hornets. Goodburn entered the NFL by signing as a free agent with the Kansas City Chiefs in 1987. He played in Super Bowl XXVI for the Washington Redskins.

Goodburn was raised in the small town of Cushing, Iowa, where he led the Eastwood Raiders to an Iowa High School Athletic Association State Championship in 1978.

== NFL career statistics ==
Legend
	Won the Super Bowl
	Led the league
**Bold**	Career high

=== Regular season ===
Year	Team	Punting									
Year	Team	GP	Punts	Yds	Net Yds	Lng	Avg	Net Avg	Blk	Ins20	TB
1987	KAN	13	59	2,412	1,909	55	**40.9**	32.4	0	13	5
1988	KAN	**16**	**76**	**3,059**	**2,426**	59	40.3	31.9	0	10	**8**
1989	KAN	**16**	67	2,688	2,263	54	40.1	33.8	0	**24**	5
1990	KAN	3	17	653	526	58	38.4	30.9	0	6	2
1990	WAS	4	11	377	334	48	34.3	30.4	0	6	1
1991	WAS	**16**	52	2,070	1,820	61	39.8	33.1	**3**	16	3
1992	WAS	**16**	64	2,555	2,123	**66**	39.9	32.7	1	17	5
1993	WAS	1	5	197	197	49	39.4	**39.4**	0	3	0
Career		85	351	14,011	11,598	66	39.9	32.7	4	95	29

=== Playoffs ===
Year	Team	Punting									
Year	Team	GP	Punts	Yds	Net Yds	Lng	Avg	Net Avg	Blk	Ins20	TB
1990	WAS	2	**13**	**474**	**445**	**49**	36.5	34.2	0	**6**	0
1991	WAS	**3**	11	412	379	45	**37.5**	**34.5**	0	2	0
1992	WAS	2	5	183	170	43	36.6	34.0	0	1	0
Career		7	29	1,069	994	49	36.9	34.3	0	9	0
