= Brian Mitchell (running back) =

American football player (born 1968)

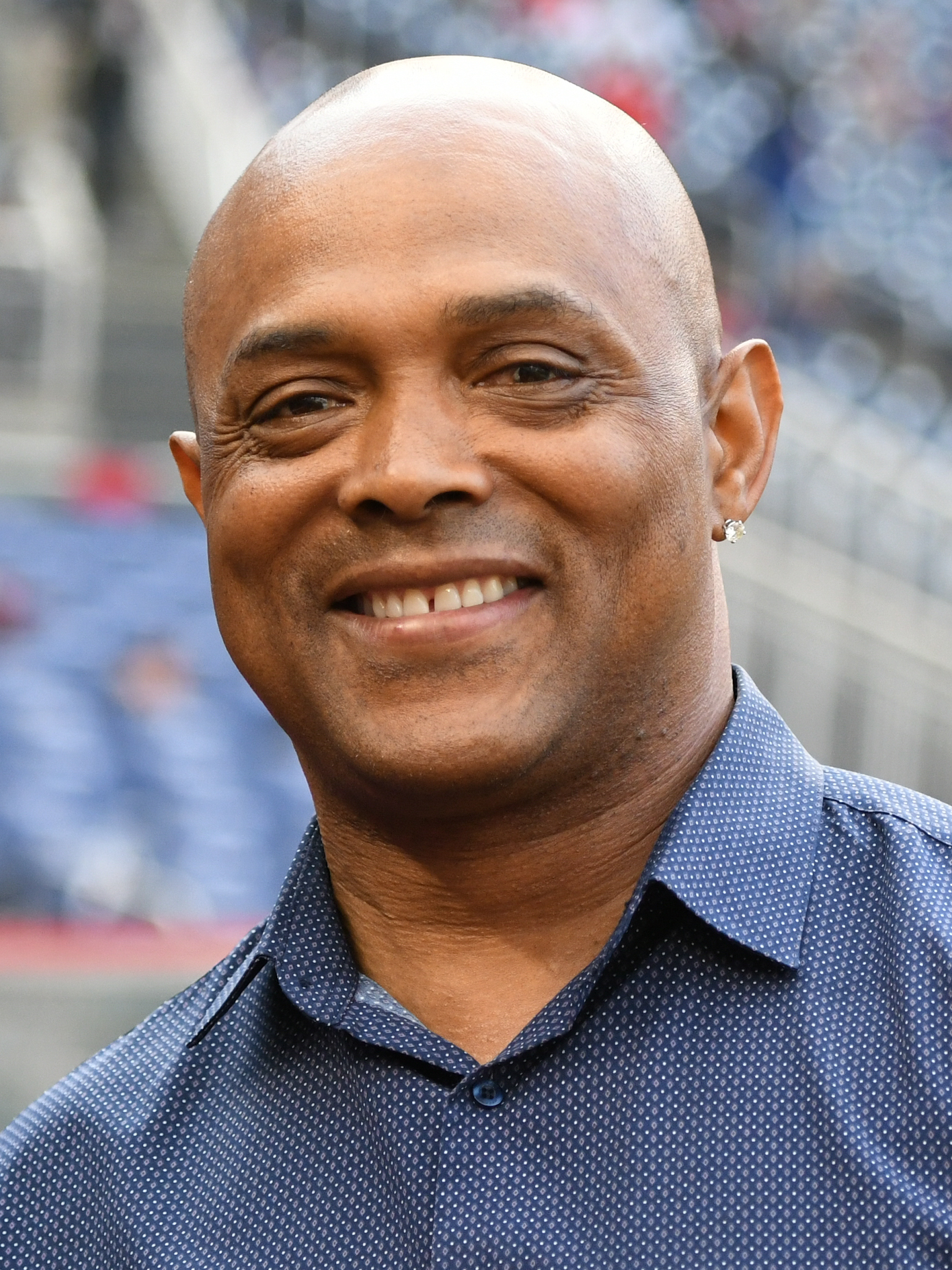
- Mitchell in 2022

No. 30
- Positions: Running back, return specialist

Personal information
- Born: August 18, 1968 (age 58); Fort Polk, Louisiana, U.S.
- Listed height: 5 ft 11 in (1.80 m)
- Listed weight: 221 lb (100 kg)

Career information
- High school: Plaquemine (Plaquemine, Louisiana)
- College: Southwestern Louisiana (1986–1989)
- NFL draft: 1990: 5th round, 130th overall pick

Career history
- Washington Redskins (1990–1999); Philadelphia Eagles (2000–2002); New York Giants (2003)

Awards and highlights
- Super Bowl champion (XXVI); First-team All-Pro (1995); 2× Second-team All-Pro (1991, 1994); Pro Bowl (1995); NFL punt return yards leader (1991); Washington Redskins 70th Anniversary Team; Washington Commanders 90 Greatest; Washington Commanders Ring of Fame; NFL records: Most career kickoff return yards: 14,014; Most career punt return yards: 4,999; Most career total return yards: 19,013; Most career total returns: 1070

Career NFL statistics
- Rushing yards: 1,967
- Rushing average: 5.1
- Rushing touchdowns: 12
- Receptions: 255
- Receiving yards: 2,336
- Receiving touchdowns: 4
- Return yards: 19,013
- Return touchdowns: 13
- Stats at Pro Football Reference

Brian Keith Mitchell (born August 18, 1968) is an American former professional football player who was a running back and return specialist in the National Football League (NFL). He played college football as a quarterback for the Southwestern Louisiana Ragin' Cajuns and was selected by the Washington Redskins in the fifth round of the 1990 NFL draft. Mitchell is considered one of the greatest return specialists in NFL history.

Mitchell also played for the Philadelphia Eagles and the New York Giants. He is currently second on the NFL's all-time all-purpose yardage with 23,330 yards, behind Jerry Rice. He is also first all-time for combined yardage for a non-wide receiver. His 13 special teams touchdowns are second in NFL history, behind Devin Hester, and his nine punt return touchdowns are third behind Eric Metcalf with 10, and Hester with 14. Mitchell was ranked the second greatest specialist in NFL history by NFL Network's NFL Top 10 Return Aces.

As of February 2021, Mitchell began co-hosting the radio show "BMitch and Finlay" on WJFK-FM with JP Finlay of NBC Sports Washington.

== Early life ==
Mitchell was the son of a career U.S. Army soldier and the youngest of seven children, born in Fort Polk, Louisiana. He played football at Plaquemine High School.

== College career ==
Mitchell attended the University of Southwestern Louisiana (now the University of Louisiana at Lafayette), where he played quarterback.

At Southwestern Louisiana, Mitchell became the first player in NCAA history to pass for more than 5,000 yards (5,447) and rush for more than 3,000 yards (3,335). He also held the NCAA record for most rushing touchdowns by a quarterback (47). As a senior, he rushed for 1,311 yards and passed for 1,966 yards while accounting for 25 touchdowns (six passing, 19 rushing). Yet, in his college career, he never returned a punt or a kickoff.

== Professional career ==
Pre-draft measurables
| Height | Weight | Arm length | Hand span | 40-yard dash | 10-yard split | 20-yard split | 20-yard shuttle | Vertical jump |
|---|---|---|---|---|---|---|---|---|
| 5 ft 10 1/8 in (1.78 m) | 198 lb (90 kg) | 29 3/8 in (0.75 m) | 10 1/4 in (0.26 m) | 4.59 s | 1.63 s | 2.79 s | 4.01 s | 32.0 in (0.81 m) |
All values from NFL Combine

Mitchell was selected in the fifth round (130th overall) of the 1990 NFL draft by the Washington Redskins.

=== Washington Redskins ===
As a rookie, Mitchell started off his career by returning the opening kickoff of the Redskins first pre-season game for a touchdown. During a Monday Night Football game that came to be known as "The Body Bag Game" on November 12, 1990, Mitchell had to be subbed in as quarterback after the Philadelphia Eagles knocked the Redskins' starting and backup quarterbacks out of the game. Mitchell went 3-for-6 for 40 yards passing and ran for a touchdown.

During his second season with the Redskins in 1991, Mitchell led the NFL in punt return yards (600) and punt return touchdowns (two), helping his team to an appearance in Super Bowl XXVI, where Washington defeated the Buffalo Bills 37–24.

Mitchell continued to play for the Redskins until 1999, leading the NFL in punt return average (14.1) and touchdowns (two) in 1994, and making a Pro Bowl selection in 1995. He also led the league in combined yards every season from 1994 through 1996, and again in 1998. He is one of only two players to lead the league in that statistical category at least four times. The other is Hall of Famer Jim Brown, who did it five times.

Mitchell was released following the 1999 season with the arrival of a new owner, Daniel Snyder.

=== Later career ===
Mitchell signed with the Philadelphia Eagles in 2000, and played for them until 2002. Despite only playing with the team for three years, Mitchell left as the franchise's all-time leader in punt return yards, and retains this record to this day.

In 2002, Mitchell was one of only two players to be ranked in the top seven in both kickoff returns and punt returns (the other being Michael Lewis of the New Orleans Saints). He was the only player in the NFC to be ranked in the top three in both categories. Mitchell was second in the NFC and third in the NFL with a career-high 27.0-yard average on 43 kickoff returns. Mitchell was also third in the NFC and seventh in the NFL with a 12.3-yard punt return average on 46 punts. He returned a punt 76 yards for a touchdown against the San Francisco 49ers on November 25. It was Mitchell's 13th career kick returned for a touchdown, breaking a tie with Eric Metcalf and ranking Mitchell first in the record book. That week, he also set a record for kick return yards in a single game with 206 yards on six kick returns.

He then signed with the New York Giants for the 2003 season. He was released before the 2004 season. He then re-signed to a one-day contract with the Washington Redskins, allowing him to retire a Redskin.

== Legacy ==
Mitchell is the NFL's second all-time leader in total yardage, second only to Jerry Rice with 23,330 yards, thanks in large part to his 14,014 yards from kickoff returns and his 4,999 punt return yards. Both are NFL records, and his 875 postseason kickoff return yards are a record as well. He also rushed for 1,967 yards on 388 carries (avg. 5.1 rushing yards), caught 255 passes for 2,336 yards, recovered 20 fumbles for 14 return yards, and scored 29 touchdowns (four kickoff returns, nine punt returns, 12 rushing, and four receiving). His 13 special teams touchdowns rank second in the NFL only behind Devin Hester. His nine punt return touchdowns rank third behind Hester (11) and Eric Metcalf (10).

Mitchell also holds the NFL record for most combined yards by any one player against a single opponent: 3,076 all-purpose yards against the Dallas Cowboys. He also holds the record for most all-purpose yards in a single decade.

He is also one of only six players to record four seasons of over 2,000 total yards, (the others being Tiki Barber, Eric Dickerson, Marshall Faulk, Dante Hall, and Darren Sproles) and missed out on a fifth season by only five yards.

He was inducted into the Washington Redskins Ring of Fame at FedEx Field during the 2009 season.

On September 14, 2016, Mitchell was nominated for the 2017 class of the Pro Football Hall of Fame, but he was not selected as a finalist. On September 22, 2021, he was nominated for the 2022 class.

== NFL career statistics ==
Legend
| | Won the Super Bowl |
| | NFL record |
| | Led the league |
| **Bold** | Career high |

=== Return specialist statistics ===
| General | | | | Punt returns | | | | | Kick returns | | | | | APY |
| Season | Team | GP | GS | PR | PRY | TD | Lng | Y/PR | KR | KRY | TD | Lng | Y/KR | APY |
|---|---|---|---|---|---|---|---|---|---|---|---|---|---|---|
| 1990 | WSH | 15 | 0 | 12 | 107 | 0 | 26 | 8.9 | 18 | 365 | 0 | 37 | 20.3 | 558 |
| 1991 | WSH | 16 | 0 | 45 | **600** | **2** | 69 | 13.3 | 29 | 583 | 0 | 35 | 20.1 | 1,197 |
| 1992 | WSH | 16 | 0 | 29 | 278 | 1 | **84** | 9.3 | 23 | 492 | 0 | 47 | 21.4 | 863 |
| 1993 | WSH | 16 | 4 | 29 | 193 | 0 | 48 | 6.7 | 33 | 678 | 0 | 68 | 20.5 | 1,274 |
| 1994 | WSH | 16 | **7** | 32 | 452 | **2** | 78 | **14.1** | 58 | **1,478** | 0 | 86 | 25.5 | **2,477** |
| 1995 | WSH | 16 | 1 | 25 | 315 | 1 | 59 | 12.6 | 55 | 1,408 | 0 | 59 | 25.6 | 2,348 |
| 1996 | WSH | 16 | 2 | 23 | 258 | 0 | 71 | 11.2 | 56 | 1,258 | 0 | 50 | 22.5 | 1,995 |
| 1997 | WSH | 16 | 1 | 38 | 442 | 1 | 63 | 11.6 | 47 | 1,094 | **1** | 97 | 23.3 | 2,081 |
| 1998 | WSH | 16 | 0 | 44 | 506 | 0 | 47 | 11.5 | **59** | 1,337 | **1** | **101** | 22.7 | 2,357 |
| 1999 | WSH | 16 | 0 | 40 | 332 | 0 | 33 | 8.3 | 43 | 893 | 0 | 45 | 20.8 | 1,755 |
| 2000 | PHI | 16 | 1 | 32 | 335 | 1 | 72 | 10.5 | 47 | 1,124 | **1** | 89 | 23.9 | 1,735 |
| 2001 | PHI | 16 | 0 | 39 | 467 | 0 | 54 | 12.0 | 41 | 1,025 | **1** | 94 | 25.0 | 1,623 |
| 2002 | PHI | 16 | 0 | 46 | 567 | 1 | 76 | 12.3 | 43 | 1,162 | 0 | 57 | **27.0** | 1,738 |
| 2003 | NYG | 16 | 0 | 29 | 154 | 0 | 15 | 5.3 | 55 | 1,117 | 0 | 29 | 20.3 | 1,329 |
| Career | | 223 | 16 | 463 | 4,999 | 9 | 84 | 10.8 | 607 | 14,014 | 4 | 101 | 23.1 | 23,330 |

=== Rushing and receiving statistics ===
| General | | | | Rushing | | | | | Receiving | | | | | | Fum |
| Season | Team | GP | GS | Att | Yards | Y/A | Y/G | TDs | Tgt | Rec | Yards | Y/R | Y/G | TDs | Fum |
|---|---|---|---|---|---|---|---|---|---|---|---|---|---|---|---|
| 1990 | WSH | 15 | 0 | 15 | 81 | 5.4 | 5.4 | 1 | N/A (Note: Data for the Targets statistic prior to the 1992 season is missing from the Pro Football Reference.) | 2 | 5 | 2.5 | 0.3 | 0 | 2 |
| 1991 | WSH | 16 | 0 | 3 | 14 | 4.7 | 0.9 | 0 | N/A | 0 | – | – | – | 0 | **8** |
| 1992 | WSH | 16 | 0 | 6 | 70 | **11.7** | 4.4 | 0 | 4 | 3 | 30 | 10.0 | 1.9 | 0 | 4 |
| 1993 | WSH | 16 | 4 | 63 | 246 | 3.9 | 15.4 | **3** | 21 | 20 | 157 | 7.9 | 9.8 | 0 | 3 |
| 1994 | WSH | 16 | **7** | **78** | **311** | 4.0 | **19.4** | 0 | 53 | 26 | 236 | 9.1 | 14.8 | 1 | 4 |
| 1995 | WSH | 16 | 1 | 46 | 301 | 6.5 | 18.8 | 1 | 50 | 38 | 324 | 8.5 | 20.3 | 1 | 2 |
| 1996 | WSH | 16 | 2 | 39 | 193 | 4.9 | 12.1 | 0 | 40 | 32 | 286 | 8.9 | 17.9 | 0 | 1 |
| 1997 | WSH | 16 | 1 | 23 | 107 | 4.7 | 6.7 | 1 | 50 | 36 | **438** | 12.2 | **27.4** | 1 | 3 |
| 1998 | WSH | 16 | 0 | 39 | 208 | 5.3 | 13.0 | 2 | **62** | **44** | 306 | 7.0 | 19.1 | 0 | 3 |
| 1999 | WSH | 16 | 0 | 40 | 220 | 5.5 | 13.8 | 1 | 40 | 31 | 305 | 9.8 | 19.1 | 0 | 2 |
| 2000 | PHI | 16 | 1 | 25 | 187 | 7.5 | 11.7 | 2 | 21 | 13 | 89 | 6.8 | 5.6 | 1 | 3 |
| 2001 | PHI | 16 | 0 | 7 | 9 | 1.3 | 0.6 | 0 | 8 | 6 | 122 | **20.3** | 7.6 | 0 | 3 |
| 2002 | PHI | 16 | 0 | 0 | – | – | – | 0 | 0 | 0 | – | – | – | 0 | 3 |
| 2003 | NYG | 16 | 0 | 4 | 20 | 5.0 | 1.3 | 1 | 5 | 4 | 38 | 9.5 | 2.4 | 1 | 5 |
| Career | | 223 | 16 | 388 | 1,967 | 5.1 | 8.8 | 12 | 354 | 255 | 2,336 | 9.2 | 10.5 | 4 | 46 |

== NFL records ==
- Combined kickoff and punt return yards: 19,013
- Combined kickoff and punt returns: 1,070
- Kickoff return yards: 14,014
- Kickoff returns: 607
- Punt return yards: 4,999
- Punt returns: 463
- Fair catches: 231

== Life after football ==
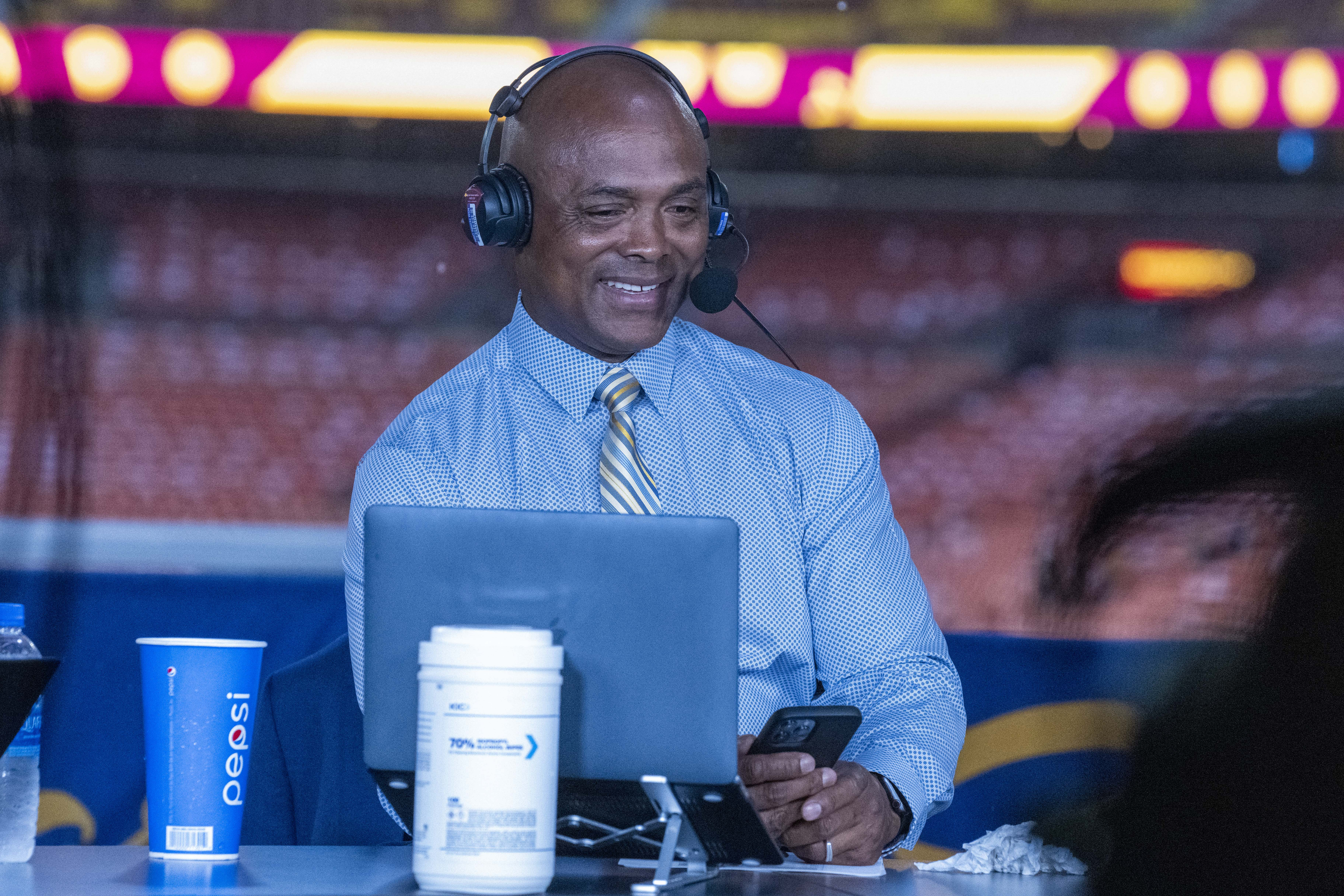
Mitchell at FedExField in 2021

=== On television ===
Since retiring, Mitchell has been a TV and radio host and analyst for a variety of outlets. On TV, he is currently the NFL analyst for WUSA-TV in Washington D.C., where he co-hosts the station's Sunday night wrap-up program entitled "Sports Plus. Additionally, Mitchell co-hosts "Sports Talk Live" with ex-hog Ric "Doc" Walker and can be seen on Redskins Pre/Post Game Live, both on NBC Sports Washington in Washington, D.C.

=== On radio ===
On radio, Mitchell was the host of The Brian Mitchell Show on WTEM, located in Rockville, Maryland, until the show ended on April 27, 2007 because of program lineup changes. He then moved to The John Thompson Show as co-host. During the 2008 season on an edition of "The John Thompson Show," Mitchell got into a heated argument with Redskins running back Clinton Portis, who was a guest on the show. Mitchell served as a frequent guest and guest host on "The Sports Junkies" and the "Mike Wise Show" on 106.7 The Fan. Brian announced on the January 21, 2010 edition of the Mike Wise Show that he would have his own show on Saturdays from 10–3 on 106.7 The Fan. He also runs the Brian Mitchell Football Camp throughout Virginia. Since March 2012, Mitchell has co-hosted ESPN 980's Inside The Locker Room with former Redskin Rick Walker and local DC area broadcaster Scott Jackson. In 2018, The Brian Mitchell Show returned with Mitchell hosting alongside Scott Linn.

In February 2021, 106.7 the Fan in Washington announced their new radio show, BMitch and Finlay, that is co-hosted by Mitchell and NBC 4 Washington Commanders beat reporter JP Finlay. The show replaced Chad Dukes Vs. the World after the radio station fired the show's host, Chad Dukes.

== Personal life ==
Mitchell has four children with his wife Monica. He founded the Brian Mitchell Foundation in 2001 to help disadvantaged children in Philadelphia, Washington, D.C., and his hometown of Plaquemine, Louisiana.
