= Craig Taylor (American football) =

American football player (born 1966)

No. 20
- Position: Running back

Personal information
- Born: January 3, 1966 (age 60); Elizabeth, New Jersey, U.S.
- Listed height: 5 ft 11 in (1.80 m)
- Listed weight: 224 lb (102 kg)

Career information
- High school: Linden (Linden, New Jersey)
- College: West Virginia
- NFL draft: 1989: 6th round, 166th overall pick

Career history
- Cincinnati Bengals (1989–1991); New Orleans Saints (1993)*; Milwaukee Mustangs (1995–1996); New Jersey Red Dogs (1997–1998)
- * Offseason or practice squad member only

Career NFL statistics
- Rushing yards: 480
- Rushing average: 4.2
- Receptions: 28
- Receiving yards: 188
- Total touchdowns: 10
- Stats at Pro Football Reference

Craig Garrett Taylor (born January 3, 1966) is an American former professional football player who was a running back in the National Football League (NFL). He played three seasons for the Cincinnati Bengals (1989–1991). He was selected by the Bengals in the sixth round of the 1989 NFL draft with the 166th overall pick.

Taylor attended Linden High School in Linden, New Jersey. He played college football for the West Virginia Mountaineers.

Pre-draft measurables
Height	Weight	40-yard dash	10-yard split	20-yard split	20-yard shuttle	Vertical jump	Broad jump	Bench press
5 ft 11 1/2 in (1.82 m)	223 lb (101 kg)	4.82 s	1.67 s	2.87 s	4.09 s	28.5 in (0.72 m)	9 ft 0 in (2.74 m)	14 reps
All values from NFL Combine
