= Paul Siever =

American football player (born 1969)

No. 74
- Position: Offensive tackle

Personal information
- Born: August 10, 1969 (age 57)

Career information
- College: Penn State
- NFL draft: 1992: 3rd round, 74th overall pick

Career history
- Washington Redskins (1992–1993); Chicago Bears (1994})*; Jacksonville Jaguars (1995)*
- * Offseason or practice squad member only

Paul Siever (born August 10, 1969) is an American former football offensive tackle in the National Football League (NFL) for the Washington Redskins, Jacksonville Jaguars, and Chicago Bears. He was drafted in the third round of the 1992 NFL Draft with the 74th overall pick by Washington. He played High school football for the Downingtown Whippets and college football for Penn State University. He was an All-American in both High School and College. He was the Assistant Principal at the Technical College High School - Pennocks Bridge Campus. He is now the dean of students known as “Coach” at TCHS Pickering.

== Sources ==
- "Paul Siever at nfl.com". NFL.com.
