= Cris Shale =

American football player (born 1968)

Profile
- Position: Punter

Personal information
- Born: June 27, 1968 (age 58); Beavercreek, Ohio, U.S.
- Listed height: 5 ft 11 in (1.80 m)
- Listed weight: 190 lb (86 kg)

Career information
- High school: Beavercreek
- College: Bowling Green
- NFL draft: 1991: 10th round, 270th overall pick

Career history
- Washington Redskins (1991)

Awards and highlights
- Super Bowl champion (XXVI); First-team All-American (1990)

Cris Shale (born June 27, 1968) is an American former college football player who was a punter for the Bowling Green Falcons. He was selected by the Washington Redskins in the 10th round of the 1991 NFL draft.

Shale became the most decorated player in Bowling Green football history after the 1990 season, earning spots on five different All-America teams. He was honored on the first-team by the AP, Football News and the AFCA, and second-team by the UPI and The Sporting News. He was selected to the 1990 College Football All-America Team.

In the 1990 season, Shale set four Mid-American Conference records, including season (46.77) and career (43.09) punting average. Shale was inducted to the BGSU Athletic Hall of Fame in 1996.

He was selected by the Washington Redskins in the tenth round of the 1991 NFL draft with the 270th overall pick. While with the Redskins he compiled no statistics.
