= Danny Copeland =

American football player (born 1966)

No. 25, 26
- Position: Safety

Personal information
- Born: January 24, 1966 (age 60); Camilla, Georgia, U.S.
- Listed height: 6 ft 2 in (1.88 m)
- Listed weight: 210 lb (95 kg)

Career information
- High school: Thomas County Central (Thomasville, Georgia)
- College: Eastern Kentucky
- NFL draft: 1988: 9th round, 244th overall pick

Career history
- Cleveland Browns (1988); Kansas City Chiefs (1989–1990); Washington Redskins (1991–1993)

Awards and highlights
- Super Bowl champion (XXVI)

Career NFL statistics
- Interceptions: 2
- Sacks: 1
- Fumble recoveries: 7
- Stats at Pro Football Reference

Danny Lamar Copeland (born January 24, 1966) is an American former professional football player who was a safety for five seasons in the National Football League (NFL). He played college football for the Eastern Kentucky Colonels. He started in Super Bowl XXVI for the Washington Redskins.

== College career ==
He played college football at Eastern Kentucky University.

== Professional career ==
Copeland was selected by the Cleveland Browns in the ninth round of the 1988 NFL draft with the 244th overall pick. The lone touchdown of his career came in a 1992 game against the Dallas Cowboys, when he recovered a fumble in the end zone with about three minutes left in the game, giving the Redskins a 20–17 win. Copeland surprised the Redskins by announcing his retirement before the 1994 season despite the fact that he had started 14 games and recorded 125 tackles the previous season. He stated injuries and reduced desire to play as the reasons for his retirement at the age of 28. He had 327 tackles and two interceptions in his three seasons as a Redskin.

== Personal life ==
Since retiring from football, Copeland moved back to Georgia and founded COGI Athletic Company, Inc. He is also a motivational speaker.
