= Ricky Ervins =

American football player (born 1968)

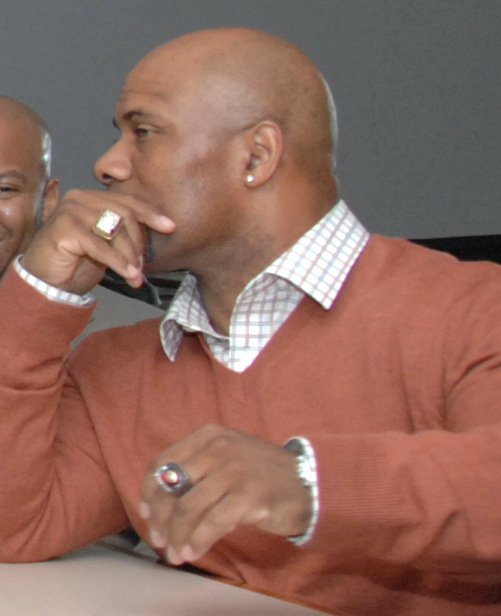
- Ervins in 2011

No. 32
- Position: Running back

Personal information
- Born: December 7, 1968 (age 57); Fort Wayne, Indiana, U.S.
- Listed height: 5 ft 7 in (1.70 m)
- Listed weight: 195 lb (88 kg)

Career information
- High school: John Muir (Pasadena, California)
- College: USC
- NFL draft: 1991: 3rd round, 76th overall pick

Career history
- Washington Redskins (1991–1994); San Francisco 49ers (1995)

Awards and highlights
- Super Bowl champion (XXVI); PFWA All-Rookie Team (1991)

Career NFL statistics
- Rushing yards: 2,114
- Rushing average: 3.8
- Rushing touchdowns: 8
- Stats at Pro Football Reference

Richard Ervins (born December 7, 1968) is an American former professional football player who was a running back in the National Football League (NFL) for the Washington Redskins and San Francisco 49ers. He played college football for the USC Trojans. He was selected by Washington in the third round of the 1991 NFL draft.

== Early life ==
Ervins attended John Muir High School in Pasadena, California, where he participated in football, baseball and competed in track and field.

== College career ==
In college, Ervins' touchdown run won the 1990 Rose Bowl for the USC Trojans and he was the game's most valuable player. He was teammates on a powerful 1989 USC team with Todd Marinovich and Junior Seau. His eight consecutive 100-yard performances at USC were behind only Heisman winners Charles White (10) and Marcus Allen (11) and has since been broken by former Trojans running back Reggie Bush.

== Professional career ==
Ervins was drafted in the third round of the 1991 NFL draft by Washington. Ervins later played for the Washington Redskins as a rookie running back, he was a second on the team in rushing yards with 680 on the season (behind Earnest Byner) and helped the team win Super Bowl XXVI. In the Super Bowl, he was the game's leading rusher, with 72 yards on 13 carries as the Redskins beat the Buffalo Bills 37–24.

Ervins received several honors during his rookie year with Washington, including the PFWA all-Rookie, Football Digest All-Rookie, Pro Football Weekly All-Rookie, Football News All-Rookie, college & Pro Football Newsweekly All-Rookie, Quarterback Club's Rookie of the year, and Washington Redskin Rookie of the year.

He stayed with the Redskins until 1994 when he moved to the San Francisco 49ers. He retired in 1995.

== Personal ==
Ricky was adopted by Tony and Sharon Crutchfield when he was 14 years old. He now runs a business, Xtreme Xplosion, that trains high school athletes in Northern Virginia.

On August 22, 2016, The Tournament of Roses announced Bobby Bell, Ricky Ervins, Tommy Prothro, and Art Spander would be inducted into the Rose Bowl Hall of Fame in the Class of 2016. The Rose Bowl Hall of Fame Induction Ceremony then took place on January 1, 2017, outside the Rose Bowl Stadium, one day before the kickoff of the 103rd Rose Bowl Game on Monday January 2, 2017.
