= Ray Rowe (American football) =

Spanish gridiron football player (born 1969)

No. 82
- Position: Tight end

Personal information
- Born: July 28, 1969 (age 57); Rota, Spain
- Listed height: 6 ft 2 in (1.88 m)
- Listed weight: 256 lb (116 kg)

Career information
- High school: Mira Mesa (San Diego, California, U.S.)
- College: San Diego State
- NFL draft: 1992: 6th round, 168th overall pick

Career history
- Washington Redskins (1992–1993); Minnesota Vikings (1994)
- Stats at Pro Football Reference

Raymond Henry Rowe (born July 28, 1969) is a former American football tight end in the National Football League (NFL) for the Washington Redskins. He played college football at San Diego State University and was selected 168th overall in the sixth round of the 1992 NFL draft.

Rowe attended Mira Mesa High School (1984–1987), where he played football and basketball for the Marauders.
