= Bobby Wilson (defensive tackle) =

American football player (born 1968)

No. 94
- Position: Defensive tackle

Personal information
- Born: March 4, 1968 (age 58); Chicago, Illinois, U.S.
- Died: May 7, 2023; Lansing, Michigan, U.S.
- Listed height: 6 ft 2 in (1.88 m)
- Listed weight: 297 lb (135 kg)

Career information
- High school: Austin Community Academy (Chicago)
- College: Michigan State
- NFL draft: 1991: 1st round, 17th overall pick

Career history
- Washington Redskins (1991–1995)

Awards and highlights
- Super Bowl champion (XXVI); Second-team All-Big Ten (1990)

Career NFL statistics
- Tackles: 141
- Sacks: 11
- Fumble recoveries: 1
- Stats at Pro Football Reference

Robert Wilson (March 4, 1968- May 7, 2023) was an American professional football player who was a defensive tackle for the Washington Redskins of the National Football League (NFL). He played college football for the Michigan State Spartans and was selected by the Washington in the first round of the 1991 NFL draft. Wilson was a member of the team that won Super Bowl XXVI his rookie season and played for Washington for four seasons.

== Early life ==
Wilson was born in Chicago, where he attended and played high school football at Austin Community Academy High School. While in high school, he also participated in wrestling and shot put.

== College career ==
Wilson attended and played college football at Michigan State University. Before attending Michigan State, he spent his freshman year at Northeastern Oklahoma A&M College, a junior college in Miami, Oklahoma.

== Professional career ==
Wilson was drafted in the first round (17th overall) of the 1991 NFL draft by the Washington Redskins, where he played from 1991 to 1994. He was a member of the 1991 Redskins team that won Super Bowl XXVI.
