= Sidney Johnson =

American football player (born 1965)

No. 45
- Position: Cornerback

Personal information
- Born: March 7, 1965 (age 61); Los Angeles, California, U.S.
- Listed height: 5 ft 9 in (1.75 m)
- Listed weight: 175 lb (79 kg)

Career information
- High school: Cerritos (Cerritos, California)
- College: California
- NFL draft: 1987: undrafted

Career history
- Kansas City Chiefs (1987–1988); Tampa Bay Buccaneers (1989)*; Kansas City Chiefs (1990)*; Washington Redskins (1990–1992)
- * Offseason or practice squad member only

Awards and highlights
- Super Bowl champion (XXVI)

Career NFL statistics
- Sacks: 1
- Interceptions: 3
- Stats at Pro Football Reference

Sidney Johnson (born March 7, 1965) is an American former professional football player who was a cornerback in the National Football League (NFL) for the Kansas City Chiefs and the Washington Redskins. He played college football for the California Golden Bears.

Sidney currently resides in Ashburn, Virginia, with his wife, Catrice. The Johnson's have four children, all boys. Nigel, the second oldest, currently plays basketball for the University of Virginia. He spent his freshman and sophomore seasons at Kansas State, before transferring to Rutgers for his junior campaign. After graduating from Rutgers, he transferred to the University of Virginia where he will complete his college career.
