= Joe Johnson (wide receiver) =

American football player (born 1962)

No. 80, 89, 9
- Position: Wide receiver

Personal information
- Born: December 21, 1962 (age 63); Washington, D.C., U.S.
- Listed height: 5 ft 8 in (1.73 m)
- Listed weight: 170 lb (77 kg)

Career information
- High school: Archbishop Carroll (DC)
- College: Notre Dame
- NFL draft: 1985: undrafted

Career history
- Tampa Bay Buccaneers (1985)*; Buffalo Bills (1986)*; Buffalo Bills (1987–1988); Washington Redskins (1989–1991); Orlando Thunder (1992); Minnesota Vikings (1992); Los Angeles Rams (1993)*; Sacramento Gold Miners (1993); Toronto Argonauts (1994)
- * Offseason or practice squad member only

Awards and highlights
- Super Bowl champion (XXVI)

Career NFL statistics
- Receptions: 24
- Receiving yards: 247
- Receiving touchdowns: 1
- Stats at Pro Football Reference

Joseph Pernell Johnson (born December 21, 1962) is an American former professional football player who was a wide receiver in the National Football League (NFL) for the Washington Redskins and the Minnesota Vikings. He played college football for the Notre Dame Fighting Irish.

Johnson was known as Joe Howard up until the 1991 season. In 1992 the Orlando Thunder listed him as Joe Howard-Johnson.
