= David Gulledge =

American football player (born 1967)

No. 29
- Position: Safety

Personal information
- Born: October 26, 1967 (age 59); Pell City, Alabama, U.S.
- Listed height: 6 ft 1 in (1.85 m)
- Listed weight: 203 lb (92 kg)

Career information
- High school: Pell City
- College: Jacksonville State
- NFL draft: 1991: 11th round, 299th overall pick

Career history
- Washington Redskins (1991–1992); Buffalo Bills (1994)*
- * Offseason or practice squad member only
- Stats at Pro Football Reference

David Gulledge (born October 26, 1967) is an American former professional football player who was a safety for the Washington Redskins of the National Football League (NFL). He played college football for the Jacksonville State Gamecocks and was selected in the 11th round of the 1991 NFL draft.

He was a quarterback at Jacksonville State University, where he set a school record for rushing touchdowns in a season (16) and career (48). He was a two-time All-Gulf South Conference selection in 1989 and 1990. In 1989, he was named the Gulf South Conference Player of the Year and was a finalist for the Harlon Hill Trophy, which is awarded to the NCAA Division II National Player of the Year. In 2007 he was inducted into the JSU Hall of Fame.
