= Earnest Byner =

American football player and coach (born 1962)

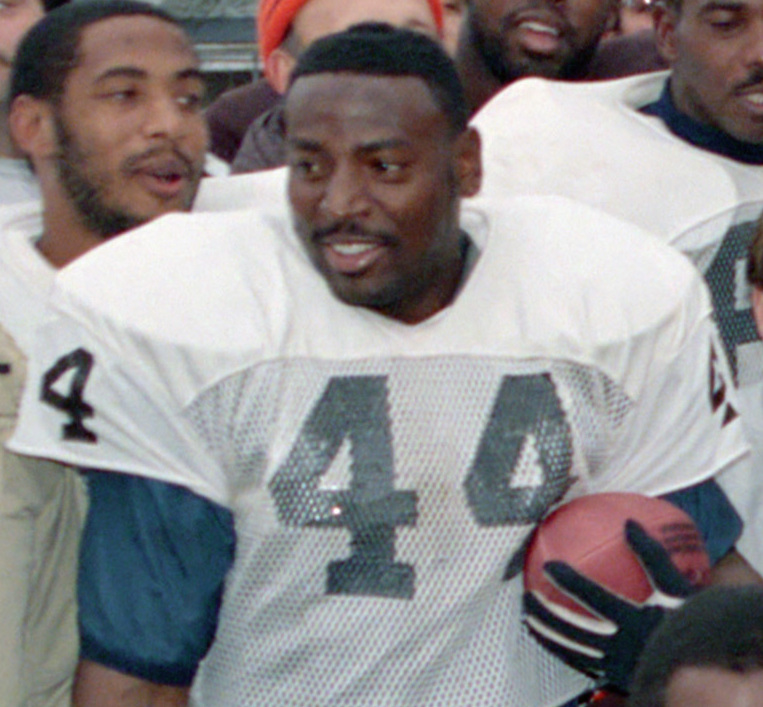
- Byner with the Cleveland Browns in 1988

No. 44, 21, 20
- Position: Running back

Personal information
- Born: September 15, 1962 (age 64); Milledgeville, Georgia, U.S.
- Listed height: 5 ft 10 in (1.78 m)
- Listed weight: 215 lb (98 kg)

Career information
- High school: Baldwin (Milledgeville)
- College: East Carolina
- NFL draft: 1984: 10th round, 280th overall pick

Career history

Playing
- Cleveland Browns (1984–1988); Washington Redskins (1989–1993); Cleveland Browns (1994–1995); Baltimore Ravens (1996–1997)

Coaching
- Washington Redskins (2004–2007) Running backs coach; Tennessee Titans (2008–2009) Running backs coach; Jacksonville Jaguars (2010–2011) Running backs coach; Tampa Bay Buccaneers (2012–2013) Running backs coach

Operations
- Baltimore Ravens (1998–2003) Director of player development

Awards and highlights
- As a player: Super Bowl champion (XXVI); Second-team All-Pro (1991); 2× Pro Bowl (1990, 1991); Baltimore Ravens Ring of Honor; Cleveland Browns Legends; 80 Greatest Redskins; As an executive: Super Bowl champion (XXXV)

Career NFL statistics
- Rushing yards: 8,261
- Rushing average: 3.9
- Rushing touchdowns: 56
- Stats at Pro Football Reference

Earnest Alexander Byner (born September 15, 1962) is an American former professional football player who was a running back in the National Football League (NFL). He played college football for the East Carolina Pirates. He is now the running backs coach of Out-of-Door Academy.

== Playing career ==
=== College career ===
Byner was a fullback at East Carolina University from 1980 to 1983 where he gained 2,049 yards on 378 carries. Byner was inducted into the East Carolina Hall of Fame in 1998. He is a member of Kappa Alpha Psi fraternity.

=== NFL career (1984–1997) ===
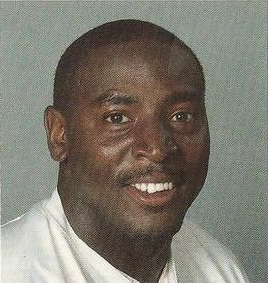
Byner in 1985

Byner was drafted by the Cleveland Browns in the tenth round (280th pick overall) of the 1984 NFL draft. He played for the Browns (1984–1988; 1994–1995), Washington Redskins (1989–1993) and the Baltimore Ravens (1996–1997).

A productive, reliable running back who could rush, block and catch the ball out of the backfield, Byner was a popular player in Cleveland. Paired with power runner Kevin Mack in the Brown backfield, the pair both gained over 1,000 yards in the 1985 season. Byner helped the Browns reach the AFC Championship game in both 1986 and 1987 seasons, meeting the Denver Broncos in both games.

In the 1987 AFC Championship Game he was instrumental in a Browns comeback from a 21–3 deficit to place the Browns in position to win the game. With the score tied at 31 midway through the 4th quarter, the Broncos scored a go-ahead touchdown to make the score 38–31 with six minutes to play. In the ensuing Cleveland drive the Browns worked the ball down the field to reach the Denver 8 yard line with a little over a minute left in the game. On the next play Byner took the Kosar handoff to run off left tackle. Byner powered past the Bronco line and looked sure to score a game-tying touchdown when Bronco defensive back Jeremiah Castille managed to strip him of the ball. The play, now known simply as "The Fumble", became the play for which Byner is best remembered. The fumble marred an otherwise impressive performance, as he finished the game with 67 rushing yards, seven receptions for 120 yards, and two touchdowns.

Byner played another season with Cleveland before being traded to the Washington Redskins on April 22, 1989 for running back Mike Oliphant. Byner was a Pro Bowl selection in 1990 when he ranked fourth in the NFL with 1,219 yards rushing and in 1991 when he ranked fifth in the NFL with 1,048 yards rushing. In the run to Super Bowl XXVI, Byner carried the ball 45 times for 168 yards while catching four passes for 35 yards, with his one touchdown coming in the Super Bowl versus Buffalo, where he caught a 10-yard pass from Mark Rypien to give Washington a 10–0 lead in the eventual victory that gave Byner a championship. His time with the Redskins earned him a position as one of the franchise's 70 Greatest Redskins.

He finished his 14-year NFL career ranked 16th on the NFL's all-time rushing list with 8,261 yards on 2,095 carries with 56 touchdowns. He also caught 512 passes (one of just 56 at the time with 500 receptions) for 4,605 yards and 15 touchdowns, returned 33 kickoffs for 576 yards, and scored a touchdown on a recovered fumble, totaling 13,442 all-purpose yards and 72 career scores. Byner finished his career within the NFL's top 50 all-time leaders in rushing attempts, rushing touchdowns, and total yards. Byner's 512 receptions is tied for 16th most by halfback/fullback/running back in NFL history as of 2026.

== Coaching ==
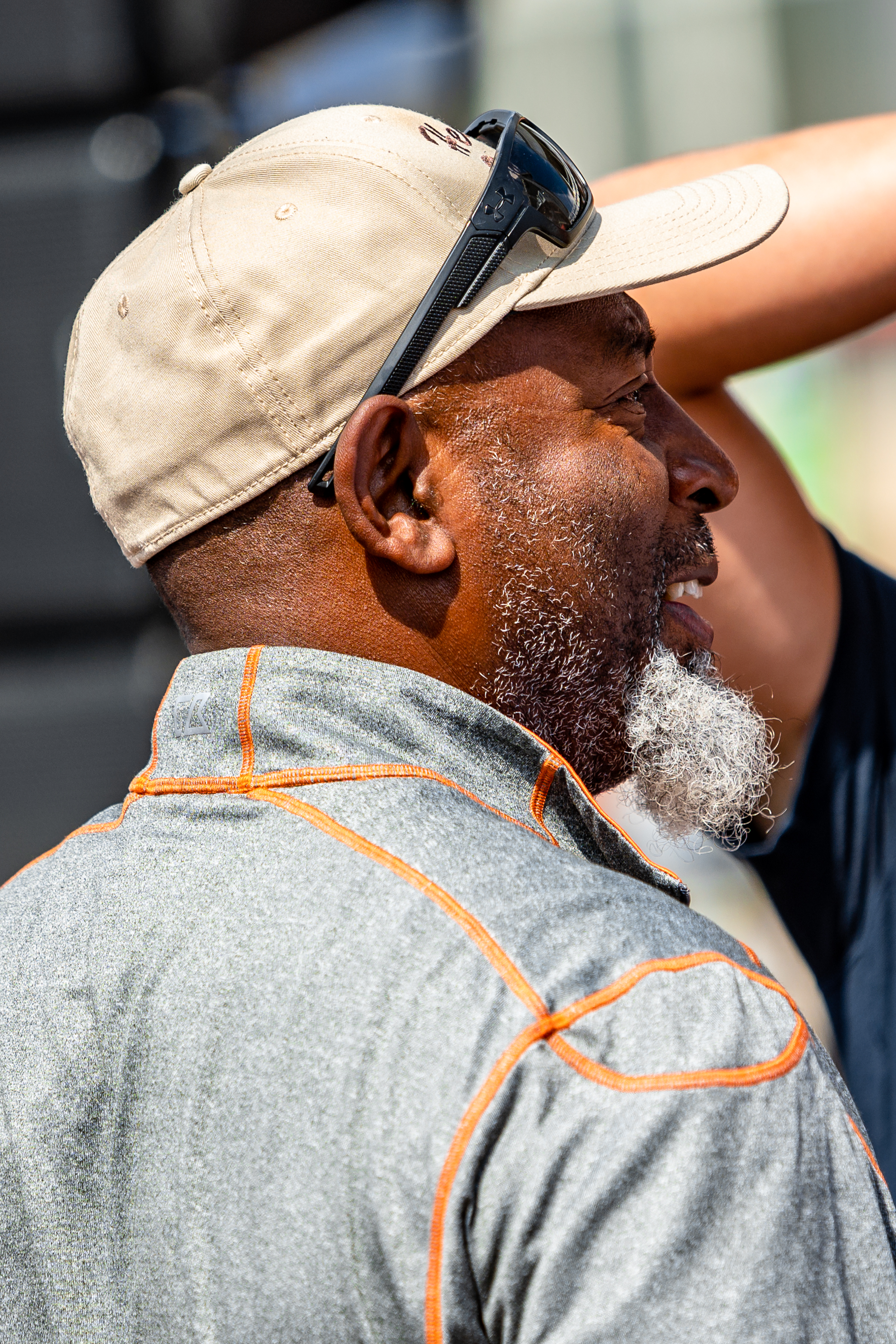
Byner in 2019

=== Baltimore Ravens ===
He worked in the Baltimore Ravens front office as the director of player development after retiring as a player. He was the first player to be inducted into the Ravens' Ring of Honor in 2000.

=== Washington Redskins ===
In January 2004, Byner was hired to be the running backs coach on Joe Gibbs' staff. He held the same position with the Redskins organization for four seasons.

=== Tennessee Titans ===
On March 10, 2008, Byner was officially announced as the running backs coach for the Tennessee Titans. He was replaced by the Titans on January 25, 2010, by former running backs coach for the Jacksonville Jaguars, Kennedy Pola.

=== Jacksonville Jaguars ===
He was named the Jacksonville Jaguars running backs coach on February 4, 2010.

=== Tampa Bay Buccaneers ===
He was named the Tampa Bay Buccaneers running backs coach on February 19, 2012, but was let go after the 2013 season when the head coach and GM were fired.

== NFL career statistics ==
Legend
	Super Bowl champion
	Led the league
**Bold**	Career high

Year	Team	Games		Rushing						Receiving					Fumbles	
Year	Team	GP	GS	Att	Yds	Avg	Y/G	Lng	TD	Rec	Yds	Avg	Lng	TD	Fum	FR
1984	CLE	**16**	3	72	426	**5.9**	26.6	**54**	2	11	118	**10.7**	26	0	3	2
1985	CLE	**16**	13	244	1,002	4.1	62.6	36	**8**	45	460	10.2	31	**2**	**5**	**4**
1986	CLE	7	7	94	277	2.9	39.6	37	2	37	328	8.9	**40**	**2**	1	0
1987	CLE	12	12	105	432	4.1	36.0	21	**8**	52	552	10.6	37	**2**	**5**	1
1988	CLE	**16**	**16**	157	576	3.7	36.0	27	3	59	**576**	9.8	39	**2**	**5**	2
1989	WAS	**16**	13	134	580	4.3	36.3	24	7	54	458	8.5	27	**2**	2	2
1990	WAS	**16**	**16**	**297**	**1,219**	4.1	**76.2**	22	6	31	279	9.0	19	1	2	1
1991	WAS	**16**	**16**	274	1,048	3.8	65.5	32	5	34	308	9.1	31	0	3	1
1992	WAS	**16**	**16**	262	998	3.8	62.4	23	6	39	338	8.7	29	1	1	0
1993	WAS	**16**	3	23	105	4.6	6.6	16	1	27	194	7.2	20	0	0	1
1994	CLE	**16**	1	75	219	2.9	13.7	15	2	11	102	9.3	30	0	–	–
1995	CLE	**16**	2	115	432	3.8	27.0	23	2	**61**	494	8.1	29	**2**	1	1
1996	BAL	**16**	8	159	634	4.0	39.6	42	4	30	270	9.0	**40**	1	1	0
1997	BAL	**16**	5	84	313	3.7	19.6	19	0	21	128	6.1	17	0	2	3
Career		211	131	2,095	8,261	3.9	39.2	54	56	512	4,605	9.0	40	15	31	18
