= Darryl Moore =

American football player (born 1969)

No. 62
- Position: Guard

Personal information
- Born: January 27, 1969 (age 57); Minden, Louisiana, U.S.
- Listed height: 6 ft 2 in (1.88 m)
- Listed weight: 292 lb (132 kg)

Career information
- High school: Minden
- College: UTEP
- NFL draft: 1992: 8th round, 224th overall pick

Career history
- Washington Redskins (1992–1993); Green Bay Packers (1994)*; Carolina Panthers (1995)*; Tampa Bay Buccaneers (1996)*; Amsterdam Admirals (1998)
- * Offseason or practice squad member only

Career NFL statistics
- Games played: 12
- Stats at Pro Football Reference

Darryl Jerome Moore (born January 27, 1969) is an American former professional football player who was a guard for the Washington Redskins of the National Football League (NFL). He played college football for the UTEP Miners and was selected in the eighth round of the 1992 NFL draft.
