= Fred Stokes =

American football player (born 1964)

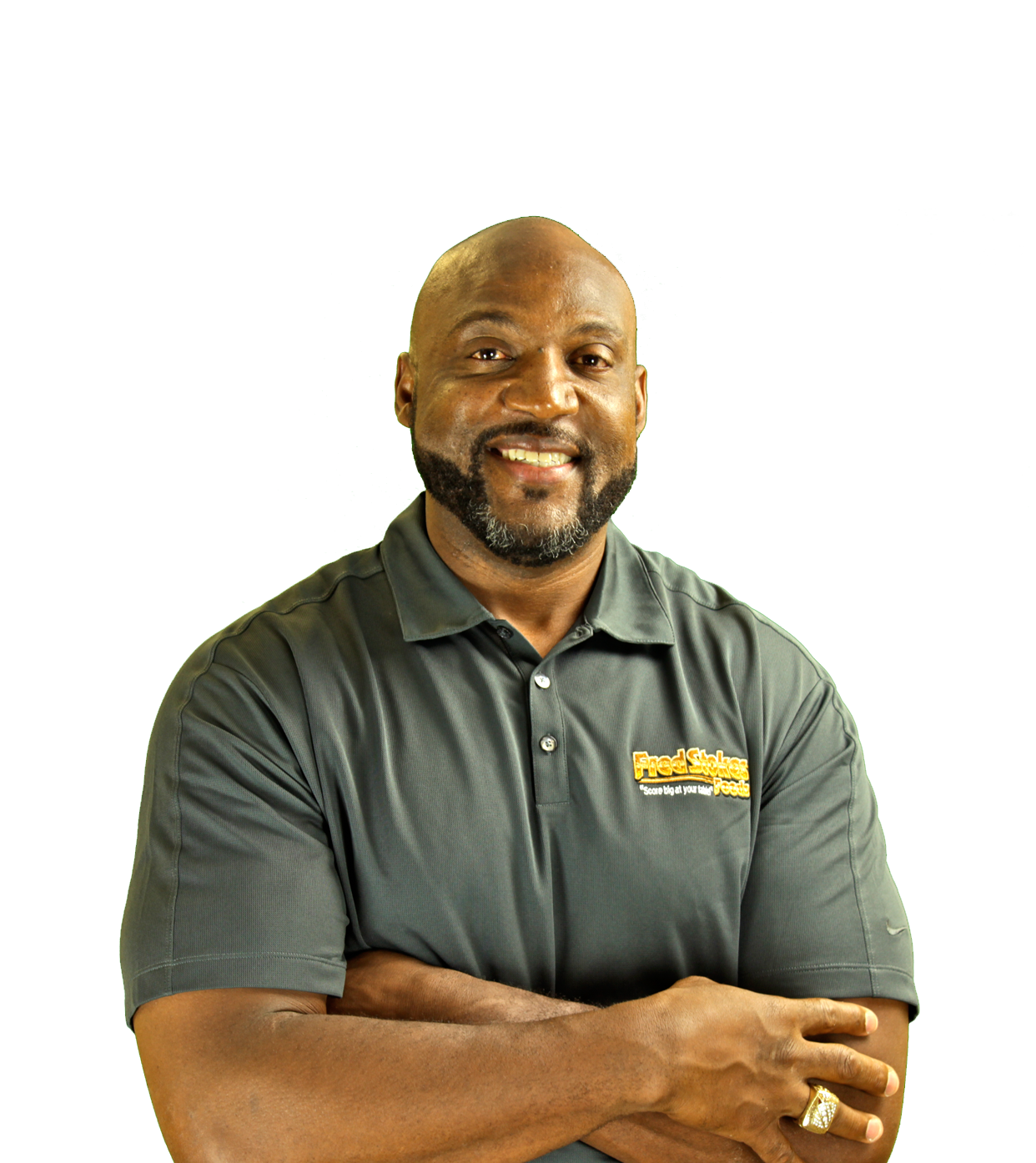
- Stokes in 2014

No. 65, 60, 71
- Position: Defensive end

Personal information
- Born: March 14, 1964 (age 62); Vidalia, Georgia, U.S.
- Listed height: 6 ft 3 in (1.91 m)
- Listed weight: 274 lb (124 kg)

Career information
- High school: Vidalia
- College: Georgia Southern
- NFL draft: 1987: 12th round, 332nd overall pick

Career history
- Los Angeles Rams (1987–1988); Washington Commanders (1989–1992); Los Angeles/St. Louis Rams (1993–1995); New Orleans Saints (1996)

Awards and highlights
- Super Bowl champion (XXVI)

Career NFL statistics
- Tackles: 229
- Sacks: 38
- Fumble recoveries: 13
- Stats at Pro Football Reference

Louis Fred Stokes (born March 14, 1964) is an American former professional football player who was a defensive end for 10 seasons in the National Football League (NFL). He played college football for the Georgia Southern Eagles. He played in the NFL for the Los Angeles/St. Louis Rams, Washington Redskins and New Orleans Saints

== Biography ==
Stokes was born in Vidalia, Georgia. Stokes played college football at Georgia Southern University.

While attending high school in Vidalia, Georgia, Fred excelled in basketball, and track. However, it was not until his senior year that he decided to give football a try. As a result of his outstanding play on the field, Stokes was offered a full scholarship to play football for the newly formed Georgia Southern Eagles in Statesboro, Georgia, under the legendary leadership of coach Erk Russell. While at Georgia Southern, Fred played on two National Championship teams (1985 and 1986). Stokes was one of two players on his team voted First-team All-America after his senior season as an offensive tackle.

In 1987, Stokes was selected into the National Football League where he would spend the next ten years playing defensive end for the Los Angeles/St. Louis Rams, Washington Redskins, and the New Orleans Saints. Stokes played in Super Bowl XXVI with the 1991 Washington Redskins against the Buffalo Bills. In that game, Stokes recorded two and half sacks, one forced fumble and one fumble recovery. Fred's teammates affectionately labeled him "Big Play Stokes" because of his knack for making the "BIG PLAY" at just the right time of a ball game.

After retiring from the NFL, Fred went back to his alma mater (Georgia Southern University) and completed his degree in 1998. Over the next several years, Fred would travel the globe selling and marketing food products to the military.

In 2007, Fred established Fred Stokes Foods.

Fred and his wife Regina have three sons and currently live in Orlando, Florida

== Professional career ==
He was selected in the 12th round of the 1987 NFL draft by the Los Angeles Rams. He started in Super Bowl XXVI.

== Life after the NFL ==
Stokes founded the Fred Stokes Youth Ranch in his hometown after his retirement and wrote an autobiography, The Bridge That Brought Me Over.

== See also ==
- St. Louis Rams
