= Chip Lohmiller =

American football player and coach (born 1966)

No. 8, 2
- Position: Placekicker

Personal information
- Born: July 16, 1966 (age 60); Woodbury, Minnesota, U.S.
- Listed height: 6 ft 3 in (1.91 m)
- Listed weight: 213 lb (97 kg)

Career information
- High school: Woodbury (MN)
- College: Minnesota
- NFL draft: 1988: 2nd round, 55th overall pick

Career history
- Washington Redskins (1988–1994); New Orleans Saints (1995); St. Louis Rams (1996)

Awards and highlights
- Super Bowl champion (XXVI); Second-team All-Pro (1991); Pro Bowl (1991); NFL scoring leader (1991); PFWA All-Rookie Team (1988); First-team All-Big Ten (1986); Second-team All-Big Ten (1987)

Career NFL statistics
- Field goals attempted: 284
- Field goals made: 204
- Field goal %: 71.8
- Stats at Pro Football Reference

John McLeod "Chip" Lohmiller (born July 16, 1966) is an American former professional football player who was a placekicker in the National Football League (NFL) for the Washington Redskins, New Orleans Saints, and St. Louis Rams. He played college football for the University of Minnesota and high school football at Woodbury Senior High School in Woodbury, Minnesota, a suburb east of Saint Paul.

== College career ==
During Lohmiller's time at Minnesota, he was named to the All-Big Ten Conference first-team in 1986 and the second-team in 1987. By the end of his college career, Lohmiller became Minnesota's all-time leading scorer with 268 points (since broken by Dan Nystrom in 2002).

== Professional career ==
Lohmiller was selected in the second round (55th overall) of the 1988 NFL draft by the Washington Redskins, for whom he played from 1988 to 1994. He finished his NFL career with the New Orleans Saints (1995) and St. Louis Rams (1996).

=== Notable moments ===
- On September 9, 1991, in a Monday Night Football game against the Dallas Cowboys, Lohmiller became the first player to kick four field goals of 45 yards or longer in a single game. The Redskins won that game 33–31 after trailing 21–10 in the second quarter. That same season, he also kicked a field goal in a 16–13 overtime win against the Houston Oilers and two fourth-quarter field goals against the Phoenix Cardinals, breaking a 14–14 tie and giving the Redskins a 20–14 win after they trailed 14–0 at halftime. Another game decided by Lohmiller's foot was against the New York Giants on October 27 when he provided the final four points (one extra point and one field goal) after the Redskins trailed 13–0 at the half but came back to tie the score and ultimately win.
- In Super Bowl XXVI on January 26, 1992, against Buffalo, he kicked two field goals late in the game that put the game out of reach in a 37–24 Redskins victory. That season, he led the league in scoring with 149 points, more than the entire Indianapolis Colts team (143).

== Personal life ==
Lohmiller was the head coach for the Pequot Lakes High School football team in Pequot Lakes, Minnesota, where they advanced to their first state appearance in school history in 2009.
