= Brad Edwards (American football) =

American football player and administrator (born 1966)

No. 27, 20
- Position: Safety

Personal information
- Born: February 22, 1966 (age 60); Lumberton, North Carolina, U.S.
- Listed height: 6 ft 2 in (1.88 m)
- Listed weight: 208 lb (94 kg)

Career information
- High school: Douglas Byrd (Fayetteville, North Carolina)
- College: South Carolina
- NFL draft: 1988: 2nd round, 54th overall pick

Career history

Playing
- Minnesota Vikings (1988–1989); Washington Redskins (1990–1993); Atlanta Falcons (1994–1996); Green Bay Packers (1997) *

Operations
- South Carolina (1999–2006) Assistant athletic director; Newberry College (2009–2012) Athletic director; Jacksonville (2012–2014) Athletic director; George Mason (2014–2022) Athletic director; NFL Alumni Association (2022-present) CEO

Awards and highlights
- Super Bowl champion (XXVI); Second-team All-American (1987)

Career NFL statistics
- Interceptions: 18
- Tackles: 598
- Touchdowns: 2
- Stats at Pro Football Reference

Bradford Wayne Edwards (born February 22, 1966) is an American former professional football player who was a safety for nine seasons in the National Football League (NFL) for the Minnesota Vikings, Washington Redskins, and the Atlanta Falcons. He is currently the chief executive officer at the NFL Alumni Association. He played college football for the South Carolina Gamecocks.

== Early life ==
Edwards was born in Lumberton, North Carolina and graduated from Douglas Byrd High School in Fayetteville, North Carolina in 1984. Brad played quarterback in high school and played for the NC championship two years in a row, unfortunately losing both. He then attended and played college football at the University of South Carolina. In May 2011, Edwards was inducted into the South Carolina Athletic Hall of Fame.

== Professional career ==
Edwards was drafted in the second round of the 1988 NFL draft by the Minnesota Vikings. He played for the Washington Redskins and started in Super Bowl XXVI against the Buffalo Bills, had two interceptions, and was runner-up MVP. He finished his career with the Atlanta Falcons, even though he signed with the Green Bay Packers for the 1997 training camp, but was cut as he didn't make the Packers' 53-man roster heading into the 1997 season.

== After football ==
Edwards previously served as an assistant athletic director and senior associate athletic director at the University of South Carolina (1999–2006) under the tutelage of athletic director Mike McGee. Following his tenure at USC, Edwards entered the private sector at IMI Resort Holdings, Inc. Edwards officially returned to athletics on May 17, 2009, when he was named the athletic director at Newberry College. He is also the former director of athletics at Jacksonville University in Jacksonville, Florida. In June 2014, he accepted a position as director of athletics at George Mason University.

In October 2022, Brad accepted his current role as chief executive officer (CEO) of the NFL Alumni Association. Founded in 1967, NFL Alumni Association is a 501(c)(3) nonprofit organization that is composed of former National Football League (NFL) players, coaches, team staff members, former cheerleaders and associate members. NFL Alumni Association mission is "Caring for Kids" and "Caring for Our Own". Edwards can also frequently be heard on Columbia's ESPN Radio station 93.1.

== Personal life ==
Edwards is married to the former Marlana Brown of Hodges, South Carolina and has three sons - Jackson, Thomas, and Colton - and a daughter, Hastings.
