= Stephen Hobbs =

American football player (born 1965)

No. 86
- Position: Wide receiver

Personal information
- Born: November 14, 1965 (age 60); Mendenhall, Mississippi, U.S.
- Listed height: 5 ft 11 in (1.80 m)
- Listed weight: 200 lb (91 kg)

Career information
- High school: Mendenhall
- College: North Alabama
- NFL draft: 1988: undrafted

Career history
- Kansas City Chiefs (1988); Washington Redskins (1989–1993)
- Stats at Pro Football Reference

Stephen B. Hobbs (born November 14, 1965) is an American former professional football player who was a wide receiver for the Washington Redskins of the National Football League (NFL). The 1991 season was his only complete season; injuries sidelined him during portions of his other playing years. He played college football at the University of North Alabama.
