= Alvoid Mays =

American football player (born 1966)

No. 20, 28
- Position: Cornerback

Personal information
- Born: July 10, 1966 (age 60); Palmetto, Florida, U.S.
- Listed height: 5 ft 9 in (1.75 m)
- Listed weight: 172 lb (78 kg)

Career information
- High school: Manatee (Bradenton, Florida)
- College: West Virginia
- NFL draft: 1989: 8th round, 217th overall pick

Career history
- Houston Oilers (1989)*; Washington Redskins (1990–1994); Pittsburgh Steelers (1995); Tampa Bay Storm (1998–1999, 2001)
- * Offseason or practice squad member only

Awards and highlights
- Super Bowl champion (XXVI); Second-team All-East (1988)

Career NFL statistics
- Tackles: 157
- Sacks: 1
- Forced fumbles: 2
- Fumble recoveries: 2
- Interceptions: 5
- Touchdowns: 1
- Stats at Pro Football Reference

Alvoid Wilson Mays (born July 10, 1966) is an American former professional football player who was a cornerback in the National Football League (NFL). He played college football for the West Virginia Mountaineers. He was selected by the Houston Oilers in the eighth round of the 1989 NFL draft.

He also played for the Washington Redskins for five seasons, helping the team win Super Bowl XXVI, and the Pittsburgh Steelers, as well as the Tampa Bay Storm of the Arena Football League (AFL).

== Professional career ==
Mays was selected in the eighth round of the 1989 NFL draft by the Houston Oilers. He was cut during training camp.

Mays scored his only touchdown on October 1, 1995, when he was with the Pittsburgh Steelers. In a game against the San Diego Chargers at Three Rivers Stadium, he intercepted a pass from Chargers Quarterback Stan Humphries & returned it for a touchdown.
