= 1932 All-Eastern football team =

American all-star college football team

The 1932 All-Eastern football team consists of American football players chosen by various selectors as the best players at each position among the Eastern colleges and universities during the 1932 college football season.

Three Eastern players were selected to the All-Eastern team and were also consensus picks on the 1932 All-America college football team: halfback Warren Heller of Pittsburgh; guard Milton Summerfelt of Army and end Joe Skladany of Pittsburgh.

== All-Eastern selections ==
=== Quarterbacks ===
- Cliff Montgomery, Columbia (AP-1)
- Robert Ramsay Chase, Brown (AP-2, CP)

=== Halfbacks ===
- Warren Heller, Pittsburgh (AP-1, CP)
- Felix Vidal, Army (AP-1)
- Whitney Ask, Colgate (CP)
- Robert Lassiter, Yale (AP-2)
- George Randour, Villanova (AP-2)

=== Fullbacks ===
- Bart Viviano (AP-1, CP)
- William Gilbane, Brown (AP-2)

=== Ends ===
- Joe Skladany, Pittsburgh (AP-1, CP)
- Jose Martinez-Zorilla, Cornell (AP-1)
- Red Matal, Columbia (AP-2, CP)
- Richard King, Army (AP-2)

=== Tackles ===
- Howard Colehower, Penn (AP-1, CP)
- Walt Uzdavinis, Fordham (AP-1)
- Jim Zyntell, Holy Cross (CP)
- Abraham George, Cornell (AP-2)
- Frank Walton, Pittsburgh (AP-2)

=== Guards ===
- Milton Summerfelt, Army (AP-1, CP)
- Robert Smith, Colgate (AP-1, CP)
- Stephen Grenda, Columbia (AP-2)
- Ralph Wolfendale, Fordham (AP-2)

=== Centers ===
- Roy Engle, Penn (AP-1)
- Tom Gilbane, Brown (AP-2, CP)

== Key ==
- AP = Associated Press
- CP = Central Press Association, selected by the football captains of the Eastern teams

== See also ==
- 1932 College Football All-America Team
