= Washington Commanders all-time roster (Kh–Z) =

1,982 players have appeared in at least one regular season or postseason game in the National Football League (NFL) for the Washington Commanders franchise since 1932. This list includes those whose last names fall between "Kh" and "Z". For the rest of the players, see Washington Commanders all-time roster (A–Ke). This list is accurate through the end of the 2025 NFL season.

This list also includes its predecessors, the Boston Braves (1932) Boston Redskins (1933–1936), Washington Redskins (1937–2019), and Washington Football Team (2020–2021). The Washington Redskins franchise was founded in Boston, Massachusetts as the Boston Braves, named after the local baseball franchise. The name was changed the next year to the Redskins. In 1937, the franchise moved to Washington, D.C. They played as the Washington Football Team from 2020 to 2021.

The Redskins played over 1,000 games. In those games, the club won five professional American football championships including two NFL Championships and three Super Bowls. The franchise captured ten NFL divisional titles and six NFL conference championships.

Overall, the Redskins had a total of 23 players and coaches (17 primary, six minor)^{[b]} inducted into the Pro Football Hall of Fame. Many Redskins players have also had successful college football careers, including six who were Heisman Trophy winners: Gary Beban, Desmond Howard, Vic Janowicz, George Rogers, Danny Wuerffel, and Robert Griffin III. In addition, the Heisman Trophy sculpture was modeled after Ed Smith in 1934, who became a Redskins player in 1936.

Several former players became head coach of the Redskins, including Turk Edwards, Dick Todd, and Jack Pardee. In addition, former players have become assistant coaches, such as Earnest Byner, Russ Grimm, Greg Manusky, and Keenan McCardell. Other players have also become successful in non-sport activities, like acting (Terry Crews and Jamal Duff) and politics (Tom Osborne and Heath Shuler).

Players on the Commanders have also been related from time to time. In 1957, Redskins end Joe Walton became the first son of an NFL player to play in the league. His father, Frank Walton also played on the Redskins. Joe Krakoski and his son, also named Joe Krakoski, also both played for the Redskins. In addition, four sets of brothers have played with each other while on the Redskins: Chris and Nic Clemons, Cecil and Ray Hare, Ed and Robert Khayat, and Dan and Matt Turk.

== Kh-Ku ==
- Ed Khayat
- Robert Khayat
- Darvin Kidsy
- Jim Kiick
- Cedric Killings
- Billy Kilmer
- Bruce Kimball
- Garry Kimble
- J. D. Kimmel
- Jon Kimmel
- Ola Kimrin
- Jim Kincaid
- Javon Kinlaw
- Kelvin Kinney
- Randy Kirk
- Jim Kitts
- Curt Knight
- Terrance Knighton
- Markus Koch
- John Koniszewski
- David Kopay
- Arie Kouandjio
- John Kovatch
- Brian Kozlowski
- Joe Krakoski (born 1937)
- Joe Krakoski (born 1962)
- Henry Krause
- Max Krause
- Paul Krause
- Joe Kresky
- Ray Krouse
- Mike Kruczek
- Al Krueger
- Larry Kubin
- Frank Kuchta
- Ryan Kuehl
- Jordan Kunaszyk
- Jake Kupp
- Bob Kuziel

== L ==
- Paul Laaveg
- Jim Lachey
- Kenny Ladler
- LaRon Landry
- Jaylin Lane
- Skip Lane
- Kenard Lang
- Anthony Lanier
- Ted Lapka
- Benny LaPresta
- Tyler Larsen
- Bill Larson
- Pete Larson
- Dick Lasse
- Donald Laster
- Kit Lathrop
- Marshon Lattimore
- Shawn Lauvao
- Joe Lavender
- Devaroe Lawrence
- Don Lawrence
- Javon Leake
- Eddie LeBaron
- Jay Leeuwenburg
- Ray Lemek
- Devin Lemons
- Reid Lennan
- Charles Leno
- Tony Leon
- Josh LeRibeus
- Otis Leverette
- Dan Lewis
- Lance Lewis
- Ron Lewis
- Kory Lichtensteiger
- Todd Liebenstein
- Paul Lipscomb
- Howie Livingston
- Brandon Lloyd
- J. W. Lockett
- Kevin Lockett
- Sean Locklear
- Marc Logan
- Chip Lohmiller
- Al Lolotai
- Bob Long
- Spencer Long
- John Lookabaugh
- Joe Don Looney
- Karl Lorch
- Andre Lott
- Rick Lovato
- John Love
- David Loverne
- Gary Lowe
- Quentin Lowry
- Cornelius Lucas
- Lew Luce
- Cole Luke
- Frankie Luvu
- Keith Lyle
- Dick Lynch

== M ==
- Ken MacAfee
- Art Macioszczyk
- David Macklin
- Jim MacMurdo
- Elmer Madarik
- Jordan Magee
- T. J. Maguranyanga
- Bill Malinchak
- Benny Malone
- Charley Malone
- Chris Mandeville
- Dexter Manley
- Charles Mann
- Tillie Manton
- Greg Manusky
- Ron Marciniak
- Pete Marcus
- Marcus Mariota
- Bud Marshall
- Byron Marshall
- Lemar Marshall
- Leonard Marshall
- Wilber Marshall
- Aaron Martin
- Jacob Martin
- Jim Martin
- Nick Martin
- Quan Martin
- Steve Martin
- Tay Martin
- Wes Martin
- Eddie Mason
- Marcus Mason
- Tommy Mason
- Bob Masterson
- Le'Shai Maston
- Phidarian Mathis
- Trevor Matich
- Shane Matthews
- Riley Mattson
- Rich Mauti
- Mark May
- Martin Mayhew
- David Mayo
- Alvoid Mays
- Fred Mazurek
- Dick McCabe
- Luke McCaffrey
- Bobby McCain
- Darnerien McCants
- Keenan McCardell
- Bob McChesney
- Terrell McClain
- Central McClellion
- Stefan McClure
- Anthony McCoy
- Colt McCoy
- Greg McCrary
- Sultan McCullough
- Robert McCune
- John McDaniel
- LeCharls McDaniel
- Ron McDole
- Ray McDonald
- Craig McEwen
- Stacy McGee
- Tim McGee
- Tony McGee
- Kyric McGowan
- Mark McGrath
- Curtis McGriff
- Rocky McIntosh
- Paul McKee
- Marlin McKeever
- Raleigh McKenzie
- Zion McKinney
- Cassanova McKinzy
- J. D. McKissic
- Terry McLaurin
- Harold McLinton
- Mark McMillian
- Donovan McNabb
- Clifton McNeil
- Jeremy McNichols
- Hal McPhail
- Pernell McPhee
- Dan McQuaid
- Kim McQuilken
- Torry McTyer
- Jim Meade
- Ed Meadows
- Johnny Meads
- Kain Medrano
- Steve Meilinger
- Don Menasco
- Mat Mendenhall
- Brandon Meriweather
- Ed Merkle
- Phillip Merling
- Eric Metcalf
- Terry Metcalf
- Eddie Michaels
- Mike Micka
- Joe Mickles
- Ron Middleton
- Matt Millen
- Allen Miller
- Clark Miller
- Fred Miller
- Gabe Miller
- Harlan Miller
- John Miller
- Tom Miller
- Von Miller
- Wayne Millner
- Lamar Mills
- Dax Milne
- Rich Milot
- Rod Milstead
- Chris Mims
- Gene Mingo
- Chase Minnifield
- Bobby Mitchell
- Brian Mitchell
- Kevin Mitchell
- Marko Mitchell
- Mike Mitchell
- Anthony Mix
- Dick Modzelewski
- Ralf Mojsiejenko
- Jim Molinaro
- Tony Momsen
- Jim Monachino
- Ray Monaco
- Art Monk
- Tommy Mont
- Anthony Montgomery
- Will Montgomery
- Jake Moody
- Nick Moody
- Chris Moore
- Chuck Moore
- Darryl Moore
- Jeff Moore
- Kareem Moore
- Larry Moore
- Michael Moore
- Wilbur Moore
- Jim Moran
- Fabian Moreau
- Jimmy Moreland
- Bob Morgan
- Boyd "Red" Morgan
- Josh Morgan
- Mike Morgan
- Sam Morley
- Alfred Morris
- Jamie Morris
- Darryl Morrison
- Tim Morrison
- Chad Morton
- Christian Morton
- Michael Morton
- Mark Moseley
- Morgan Moses
- Eddie Moss
- Joe Moss
- Santana Moss
- Calvin Muhammad
- Herb Mul-Key
- Jerome Murphy
- Mark Murphy
- Trent Murphy
- Eddie Murray
- Adrian Murrell
- Spain Musgrove
- Jim Musick
- Rob Myers
- Tom Myslinski

== N ==
- Andy Natowich
- Chris Neild
- Mike Nelms
- Kyle Nelson
- Ralph Nelson
- Jer'Zhan Newton
- Gerald Nichols
- Montae Nicholson
- Laurie Niemi
- Jim Ninowski
- John Nisby
- Doyle Nix
- Leo Nobile
- Brandon Noble
- James Noble
- George Nock
- Al Noga
- Jim Norman
- Josh Norman
- Hal Norris
- Jared Norris
- Jim North
- Jim Norton
- Andrew Norwell
- Doug Nott
- Dexter Nottage
- Nick Novak
- Ty Nsekhe
- Dan Nugent
- Bob Nussbaumer

== O ==
- Efe Obada
- Fran O'Brien
- Gail O'Brien
- Stu O'Dell
- Curly Oden
- Chris Odom
- Pat Ogrin
- Dare Ogunbowale
- Ifeanyi Ohalete
- Kenny Okoro
- Mike Oliphant
- Muhammad Oliver
- Neal Olkewicz
- Les Olsson
- Johnny Olszewski
- Brian Orakpo
- Nate Orchard
- Terry Orr
- K. J. Osborn
- Tom Osborne
- Chet Ostrowski
- Tyler Ott
- Brig Owens
- Don Owens
- Rich Owens
- Tyler Owens

== P ==
- Vince Pacewic
- Stephen Paea
- Jeff Paine
- Vinston Painter
- Glenn Pakulak
- Sterling Palmer
- John Paluck
- Oran Pape
- John Papit
- Jack Pardee
- Vaughn Parker
- Ed Parks
- Timon Parris
- Lemar Parrish
- Rich Parson
- Joe Pasqua
- David Patten
- Dimitri Patterson
- Jaret Patterson
- Joe Patton
- Marvcus Patton
- Chris Paul
- Niles Paul
- Tito Paul
- Sam Paulescu
- Logan Paulsen
- Daron Payne
- Jim Peebles
- Rodney Peete
- Dan Peiffer
- Bob Pellegrini
- Donald Penn
- Gene Pepper
- John Pergine
- Samaje Perine
- Lonnie Perrin
- Floyd Peters
- Otha Peters
- Tony Peters
- Volney Peters
- Adrian Peterson
- Nelson Peterson
- Russ Peterson
- Richie Petitbon
- Phil Pettey
- Carroll Phillips
- Dashaun Phillips
- Joe Phillips
- Al Piasecky
- Antonio Pierce
- Danny Pierce
- Kevin Pierre-Louis
- Ross Pierschbacher
- Erny Pinckert
- Ryan Plackemeier
- Tony Plansky
- Jerry Planutis
- Terrance Plummer
- Jim Podoley
- Dick Poillon
- Fran Polsfoot
- Tyler Polumbus
- Antwaune Ponds
- Tracy Porter
- Clinton Portis
- Jeff Posey
- Benning Potoa'e
- John Potter
- Myron Pottios
- Darryl Pounds
- Shar Pourdanesh
- Carl Powell
- Leo Presley
- Jim Prestel
- Bobby Price
- Byron Pringle
- Pierson Prioleau
- Vince Promuto
- Joshua Pryor
- Terrelle Pryor
- Mike Pucillo
- Garry Puetz
- Jordan Pugh

== Q ==
- Jeff Query
- Brian Quick
- Bill Quinlan
- Richard Quinn
- Trey Quinn
- Ed Quirk

== R ==
- Marc Raab
- Bob Raba
- Casey Rabach
- Bacarri Rambo
- Knox Ramsey
- Patrick Ramsey
- Antwaan Randle El
- Walter Rasby
- Sha'reff Rashad
- Cory Raymer
- Jeremy Reaves
- Willard Reaves
- Ron Rector
- Silas Redd
- Alvin Reed
- Andre Reed
- Jordan Reed
- Robert Reed
- John Reger
- Milt Rehnquist
- Will Renfro
- Pug Rentner
- Kendall Reyes
- Sammis Reyes
- Craig Reynolds
- M. C. Reynolds
- Demetrius Rhaney
- Frank Ribar
- Jim Ricca
- Stanley Richard
- Grady Richardson
- Huey Richardson
- Paul Richardson
- Pat Richter
- John Ridgeway III
- John Riggins
- Gerald Riggs
- Jim Riggs
- Jack Riley
- Perry Riley
- Chad Rinehart
- Andre Roberts
- Darryl Roberts
- Jack Roberts
- Walter Roberts
- Pete Robertson
- Aldrick Robinson
- Brian Robinson Jr.
- Dave Robinson
- Keenan Robinson
- Lybrant Robinson
- Tony Robinson
- Trenton Robinson
- William Robinson
- Reggie Roby
- Sav Rocca
- Walt Rock
- Tracy Rocker
- Dominique Rodgers-Cromartie
- Chris Rodriguez
- Bill Roehnelt
- Armani Rogers
- Carlos Rogers
- George Rogers
- Justin Rogers (cornerback)
- Sal Rosato
- Carlton Rose
- Nick Rose
- Rashad Ross
- George Rosso
- Bunmi Rotimi
- Chase Roullier
- Tom Roussel
- Mike Roussos
- Ray Rowe
- Robert Royal
- Evan Royster
- Ed Rubbert
- Keith Rucker
- Mike Rumph
- Tommy Runnels
- Darius Rush
- Tyrone Rush
- Anderson Russell
- Bo Russell
- Cliff Russell
- Darrell Russell
- Twan Russell
- Reggie Rust
- Joe Rutgens
- Ralph Ruthstrom
- Jeff Rutledge
- Frank Ryan
- Dan Ryczek
- Julie Rykovich
- Lou Rymkus
- Mark Rypien
- Ted Rzempoluch

== S ==
- Eddie Saenz
- Anthony Sagnella
- Mike Sainristil
- Joe Salave'a
- Ed Salem
- Bryant Salter
- Johnny Sample
- Curtis Samuel
- Deebo Samuel
- Chris Samuels
- John Sanchez
- Mark Sanchez
- Chris Sanders
- Deion Sanders
- Lonnie Sanders
- Ricky Sanders
- Dan Sandifer
- Jamarca Sanford
- Sandy Sanford
- Phil Sarboe
- Tony Sardisco
- Don Sasa
- Ron Saul
- Darnell Savage
- Sebastian Savage
- John Sawyer
- John Scafide
- Jerry Scanlan
- Jack Scarbath
- Brandon Scherff
- Doyle Schick
- Ralph Schilling
- Mark Schlereth
- Kermit Schmidt
- Roy Schmidt
- Ray Schoenke
- Jim Schrader
- Jay Schroeder
- Paul Schuette
- Wes Schweitzer
- Willard Scissum
- Darrion Scott
- Greg Scott
- Jake Scott
- Trent Scott
- Ben Scotti
- Joe Scudero
- Mike Scully
- George Seals
- Ricky Seals-Jones
- Virgil Seay
- Mike Sebastian
- Nick Sebek
- Chris Sedoris
- John Seedborg
- Austin Seibert
- Mike Sellers
- Frank Seno
- Coty Sensabaugh
- Kato Serwanga
- Tim Settle
- Tony Settles
- Jeff Severson
- Bob Seymour
- Kevon Seymour
- Sam Shade
- Everett Sharp
- David Sharpe
- Kenny Shedd
- Derrick Shepard
- Bill Shepherd
- Leslie Shepherd
- Dick Shiner
- Herb Shoener
- Jim Shorter
- Clyde Shugart
- Don Shula
- Heath Shuler
- Tony Siano
- Herb Siegert
- Larry Siemering
- Ed Simmons
- Roy Simmons
- John Simon
- Chad Simpson
- Cam Sims
- Keith Sims
- Steven Sims
- Matt Sinclair
- Steve Sinko
- Ben Sinnott
- Manny Sistrunk
- Justin Skaggs
- Steve Slivinski
- Joey Slye
- Wendell Smallwood
- Alex Smith (born 1982)
- Alex Smith (born 1984)
- Ben Smith
- Bruce Smith
- Cedric Smith
- Clifton Smith
- Derek Smith
- Dick Smith (born 1912)
- Dick Smith (born 1944)
- Ed Smith
- George Smith
- Hugh Smith
- Hunter Smith
- J. T. Smith
- Jack Smith
- Jerry Smith
- Jim Smith
- Jimmy Smith
- Larry Smith
- Marcus Smith
- Maurice Smith
- Paul Smith
- Preston Smith
- Ricky Smith
- Riley Smith
- Timmy Smith
- Vernice Smith
- Willie Smith
- James Smith-Williams
- Fish Smithson
- Fred Smoot
- Norm Snead
- Bob Sneddon
- Ron Snidow
- Angelo Snipes
- Justin Snow
- Jim Snowden
- Joe Soboleski
- Mike Sommer
- Jack Sommers
- Martrell Spaight
- Frank Spaniel
- Dave Sparks
- Jack Spellman
- Akeem Spence
- Noah Spence
- John Spirida
- Shawn Springs
- Jeremy Sprinkle
- Benjamin St-Juste
- Ed Stacco
- Brenden Stai
- Don Stallings
- Donté Stallworth
- Dick Stanfel
- Walter Stanley
- George Starke
- Leo Stasica
- Jim Staton
- John Steber
- Jim Steffen
- David Steinmetz
- Paul Stenn
- Mike Stensrud
- Leonard Stephens
- Red Stephens
- Rod Stephens
- Mike Steponovich
- Matt Stevens
- Dominique Stevenson
- Dave Stief
- Bill Stits
- Mark Stock
- Fred Stokes
- Tim Stokes
- Ken Stone
- Pete Stout
- Omar Stoutmire
- Dick Stovall
- Tyronne Stowe
- Clem Stralka
- Fred Strickland
- Greg Stroman
- Ricky Stromberg
- Billy Strother
- Jim Stuart
- Dana Stubblefield
- Fred Sturt
- Andy Stynchula
- Shaun Suisham
- Alex Sulfsted
- John Sullivan
- Dave Suminski
- Nick Sundberg
- Ed Sutton
- Eric Sutton
- D. J. Swearinger
- Montez Sweat
- Walt Sweeney
- Bob Sykes
- Trumaine Sykes
- Josh Symonette
- Len Szafaryn
- Dave Szott

== T ==
- Diron Talbert
- Ralph Tamm
- Darryl Tapp
- Charley Taylor
- Hugh Taylor
- Jason Taylor
- Keith Taylor
- Mike Taylor
- Roosevelt Taylor
- Sean Taylor
- Mark Temple
- Joe Tereshinski
- Daryl Terrell
- David Terrell
- Joe Theismann
- Harry Theofiledes
- Keith Thibodeaux
- R. C. Thielemann
- Chris Thomas
- Devin Thomas
- Duane Thomas
- George Thomas
- Johnny Thomas
- Logan Thomas
- Mike Thomas
- Phillip Thomas
- Pierre Thomas
- Ralph Thomas
- Randy Thomas
- Simeon Thomas
- Spencer Thomas
- Brandyn Thompson
- Chris Thompson
- Derrius Thompson
- Ricky Thompson
- Steve Thompson
- James Thrash
- Brian Thure
- Steve Thurlow
- Mike Tice
- Rusty Tillman
- Ron Tilton
- Mitchell Tinsley
- Bob Titchenal
- Dick Todd
- Brendan Toibin
- Greg Toler
- Bob Toneff
- Shaka Toney
- Casey Toohill
- Ryan Torain
- LaVern Torgeson
- Leigh Torrence
- Flavio Tosi
- Jon Toth
- Morris Towns
- Tom Tracy
- Lynden Trail
- Brycen Tremayne
- Zach Triner
- Jeremiah Trotter
- Dave Truitt
- Olanda Truitt
- Justin Tryon
- Ross Tucker
- Dick Tuckey
- Laremy Tunsil
- Tom Tupa
- Dan Turk
- Matt Turk
- Doug Turley
- Cole Turner
- J. T. Turner
- Jay Turner
- Kevin Turner
- Scott Turner
- Trai Turner
- James Tuthill
- Shy Tuttle
- Jim Tyrer

== U ==
- Mitchell Ucovich
- Jeff Uhlenhake
- Steve Uhrinyak
- Harry Ulinski
- Joe Ungerer
- Regan Upshaw

== V ==
- Ted Vactor
- Tanner Vallejo
- Matt Vanderbeek
- Mike Varty
- Clarence Vaughn
- Sam Venuto
- Clarence Verdin
- Ed Vereb
- Kipp Vickers
- Zach Vigil
- Troy Vincent
- Lionel Vital
- Ed Voytek

== W ==
- Ray Waddy
- Bob Wade
- Todd Wade
- Henry Waechter
- Bobby Wagner
- Jim Wahler
- Brian Walker
- DeMarcus Walker
- Marquis Walker
- Mykal Walker
- Rick "Doc" Walker
- Tyson Walter
- Les Walters
- Tom Walters
- Alvin Walton
- Frank Walton
- Joe Walton
- Bill Ward
- David Ward
- Kevin Ware
- Ron Warner
- Don Warren
- Michael Warren
- Anthony Washington
- Fred Washington
- James Washington
- Joe Washington
- Marcus Washington
- Mickey Washington
- Dale Waters
- Carlos Watkins
- Jim Watson
- Kenny Watson
- Sid Watson
- George Watts
- Tress Way
- Jester Weah
- Jim Weatherall
- Charlie Weaver
- Kayvon Webster
- Jack Weil
- Heinie Weisenbaugh
- Herb Welch
- Casey Weldon
- Larry Weldon
- Louis Weller
- Billy Wells
- Carson Wentz
- Byron Westbrook
- Michael Westbrook
- Ed Westfall
- Ken Whisenhunt
- Jeris White
- Markus White
- Marvin Whited
- Nick Whiteside
- A. D. Whitfield
- Bob Whitlow
- Donte Whitner
- Jace Whittaker
- Paul Wiggins
- John Wilbur
- Barry Wilburn
- George Wilde
- James Wilder
- Rachad Wildgoose
- Garnell Wilds
- Basil Wilkerson
- Willie Wilkin
- Roy Wilkins
- Dan Wilkinson
- Cary Williams
- Doug Williams
- Edwin Williams
- Eric Williams
- Fred Williams
- Gerard Williams
- Greg Williams
- Jamel Williams
- Jeff Williams
- Johnny Williams
- Jonathan Williams
- Keiland Williams
- Kevin Williams
- Madieu Williams
- Marvin Williams
- Mike Williams (born 1959)
- Mike Williams (born 1980)
- Nick Williams
- Roydell Williams
- Sid Williams
- Trent Williams
- Trevardo Williams
- Tyrone Williams
- Ernie Williamson
- Keith Willis
- Larry Willis
- Bobby Wilson
- Chris Wilson
- Eric Wilson
- Josh Wilson
- Mark Wilson
- Ted Wilson
- Wayne Wilson
- Tydus Winans
- David Windham
- Brandon Winey
- Heath Wingate
- Doug Winslow
- Ryan Winslow
- Daniel Wise
- Deatrich Wise Jr.
- Cas Witucki
- Otis Wonsley
- Dick Woodard
- Dennis Woodberry
- Lee Woodruff
- Tony Woods
- John Wooten
- Mike Wooten
- Doug Worthington
- Isaiah Wright
- Kenny Wright
- Matthew Wright
- Steve Wright
- Ted Wright
- Toby Wright
- Danny Wuerffel
- Jim Wulff
- Fred Wyant
- Sam Wyche
- Frank Wycheck
- Doug Wycoff
- Andrew Wylie
- Renaldo Wynn
- Will Wynn
- Pete Wysocki

== Y ==
- Colson Yankoff
- Eric Yarber
- Todd Yoder
- John Yonakor
- Cade York
- Jim Youel
- Bill Young
- Chase Young
- Darrel Young
- Roy Young
- Wilbur Young
- Jim Youngblood
- Walt Yowarsky

== Z ==
- Olamide Zaccheaus
- Bert Zagers
- Joe Zelenka
- Peppi Zellner
- Max Zendejas
- Joe Zeno
- Roy Zimmerman
- Chris Zorich
