= 1930 All-Eastern football team =

American all-star college football team

The 1930 All-Eastern football team consists of American football players chosen by various selectors as the best players at each position among the Eastern colleges and universities during the 1930 college football season.

Fullback Leonard Macaluso of Colgate and center Ben Ticknor of Harvard were the only two players selected by all four major selectors.

== All-Eastern selections ==
=== Quarterbacks ===
- Albie Booth, Yale (AP-1, UP-1 [hb], INS-1)
- Bill Morton, Dartmouth (UP-1)
- Edward Baker, Pittsburgh (NEA-1)
- Barry Wood, Harvard (AP-2)

=== Halfbacks ===
- Bart Viviano, Cornell (AP-1, UP-1)
- Ralph Hewitt, Columbia (AP-1, NEA-2)
- J. Leslie Hart, Colgate (AP-2, NEA-1)
- Cornelius Murphy, Fordham (INS-1)
- Bill Tanguay, NYU (INS-1)
- Jack Grossman, Rutgers (NEA-1)
- Phillip O'Connell, Holy Cross (AP-2)
- Howard Eyth, Carnegie Tech (NEA-2)
- Lou Kirn, Navy (NEA-2)

=== Fullbacks ===
- Leonard Macaluso, Colgate (AP-1, UP-1, INS-1, NEA-1)
- Cornelius Murphy, Fordham (AP-2)
- Edwin Bartrug, West Virginia (NEA-2)

=== Ends ===
- Paul Riblett, Penn (UP-1, INS-1)
- Jerry Nemececk, NYU (AP-1, UP-1)
- Edwin Messinger, Army (INS-1, NEA-2)
- Herster Barres, Yale (AP-1)
- Carlmark, Army (AP-1)
- Stanley Yudicky, Dartmouth (NEA-1)
- John Orsi, Colgate (NEA-1)
- Harding, Harvard (AP-2)
- Ted Rosenzweig, Carnegie Tech (NEA-2)

=== Tackles ===
- Jack Price, Army (AP-1, UP-1, NEA-1)
- Blimp Bowstrom, Navy (UP-1, NEA-2)
- Francis Foley, Fordham (AP-1)
- John Goodwillie, Dartmouth (INS-1)
- George A. Ellert, Syracuse (INS-1)
- Lewis W. Newton, Syracuse (NEA-1)
- Francis Vincent, Yale (AP-2)
- Paul Crehan, Dartmouth (AP-2)
- Charles Tully, Pittsburgh (NEA-2)

=== Guards ===
- Frederick J. Linehan, Yale (AP-1, UP-1, INS-1, NEA-2)
- Henry Wisniewski, Fordham (AP-2, UP-1, INS-1, NEA-1)
- Gabriel Bromberg, Dartmouth (AP-1, NEA-1)
- Charles Humber, Army (AP-2)
- Lombardi, Syracuse (NEA-2)

=== Centers ===
- Ben Ticknor, Harvard (AP-1, UP-1, INS-1, NEA-1)
- Tony Siano, Fordham (AP-2)
- Milton Berner, Syracuse (NEA-2)

== Key ==
- AP = Associated Press
- UP = United Press
- INS = International News Service, selected by INS writer James L. Kilgallen
- NEA = Newspaper Enterprise Association

== See also ==
- 1930 College Football All-America Team
