= Washington Commanders all-time roster (A–Ke) =

1,982 players have appeared in at least one regular season or postseason game in the National Football League (NFL) for the Washington Commanders franchise since 1932. This list includes those whose last names fall between "A" and "Ke". For the rest of the players, see Washington Commanders all-time roster (Kh–Z). This list is accurate through the end of the 2025 NFL season.

This list also includes its predecessors, the Boston Braves (1932) Boston Redskins (1933–1936), Washington Redskins (1937–2019), and Washington Football Team (2020–2021). The Washington Redskins franchise was founded in Boston, Massachusetts as the Boston Braves, named after the local baseball franchise. The name was changed the next year to the Redskins. In 1937, the franchise moved to Washington, D.C. They played as the Washington Football Team from 2020 to 2021.

The Redskins played over 1,000 games. In those games, the club won five professional American football championships including two NFL Championships and three Super Bowls. The franchise captured ten NFL divisional titles and six NFL conference championships.

Overall, the Redskins had a total of 23 players and coaches (17 primary, six minor)^{[b]} inducted into the Pro Football Hall of Fame. Many Redskins players have also had successful college football careers, including six who were Heisman Trophy winners: Gary Beban, Desmond Howard, Vic Janowicz, George Rogers, Danny Wuerffel, and Robert Griffin III. In addition, the Heisman Trophy sculpture was modeled after Ed Smith in 1934, who became a Redskins player in 1936.

Several former players became head coach of the Redskins, including Turk Edwards, Dick Todd, and Jack Pardee. In addition, former players have become assistant coaches, such as Earnest Byner, Russ Grimm, Greg Manusky, and Keenan McCardell. Other players have also become successful in non-sport activities, like acting (Terry Crews and Jamal Duff) and politics (Tom Osborne and Heath Shuler).

Players on the Commanders have also been related from time to time. In 1957, Redskins end Joe Walton became the first son of an NFL player to play in the league. His father, Frank Walton also played on the Redskins. Joe Krakoski and his son, also named Joe Krakoski, also both played for the Redskins. In addition, four sets of brothers have played with each other while on the Redskins: Chris and Nic Clemons, Cecil and Ray Hare, Ed and Robert Khayat, and Dan and Matt Turk.

== A ==
- Dick Absher
- John Adams
- Willie Adams
- Tucker Addington
- Mario Addison
- Nick Adduci
- Mark Adickes
- Joe Aguirre
- David Akers
- Alex Akingbulu
- Frank Akins
- Dick Alban
- Ethan Albright
- Ki Aldrich
- Adonis Alexander
- Lorenzo Alexander
- Patrise Alexander
- Shaun Alexander
- Stephen Alexander
- Bruce Alford Jr.
- Nick Allegretti
- Anthony Allen
- Gerry Allen
- Johnny Allen
- Jonathan Allen
- Kyle Allen
- Terry Allen
- Mack Alston
- David Amerson
- Trey Amos
- Vito Ananis
- Abdullah Anderson
- Bill Anderson
- Bobby Anderson
- Bruce Anderson
- David Anderson
- Erick Anderson
- Flipper Anderson
- Gary Anderson
- Ryan Anderson
- Stuart Anderson
- Terry Anderson
- Steve Andrako
- Troy Apke
- Marger Apsit
- David Archer
- Adam Archuleta
- Arnie Arenz
- Obed Ariri
- Alex Armah
- Jessie Armstead
- Anthony Armstrong
- Dorance Armstrong
- Jim Arneson
- Walt Arnold
- LaVar Arrington
- Corrie Artman
- Jamie Asher
- Darryl Ashmore
- Dale Atkeson
- Pervis Atkins
- Jess Atkinson
- Oshiomogho Atogwe
- Earl Audet
- Terrence Austin
- John Aveni
- Don Avery
- Jim Avery

== B ==
- Coy Bacon
- David Bada
- John Badaczewski
- Rick Badanjek
- Jeff Badet
- Brad Badger
- Steve Bagarus
- Ed Bagdon
- Champ Bailey
- Robert Bailey
- Chris Baker
- Sam Baker
- Kentwan Balmer
- Vic Baltzell
- Romeo Bandison
- Don Bandy
- Brandon Banks (born 1987)
- Brandon Banks (born 1994)
- Carl Banks
- Tony Banks
- Willie Banks
- Jack Banta
- Ernie Barber
- Jim Barber
- Peyton Barber
- Ricky Barber
- Shawn Barber
- Ken Barefoot
- Ken Barfield
- Bryan Barker
- Ed Barker
- Tony Barker
- Billy Ray Barnes
- Brandon Barnes
- Kevin Barnes
- Tomur Barnes
- Walt Barnes
- Doug Barnett
- Nick Barnett
- Steve Barnett
- Troy Barnett
- Tommy Barnhardt
- Roy Barni
- Malcolm Barnwell
- Tom Barrington
- Paul Barry
- Cody Barton
- Hank Bartos
- Joe Bartos
- Mike Bass
- Houston Bates
- John Bates
- Michael Bates
- D'Anthony Batiste
- Michael Batiste
- Marco Battaglia
- Cliff Battles
- Marcus Baugh
- Sammy Baugh
- Maxie Baughan
- Rashad Bauman
- Frank Bausch
- Martin Bayless
- Tom Beasley
- Ed Beatty
- Steve Beauharnais
- Gary Beban
- John Beck
- Tom Bedore
- Ryan Bee
- Ed Beinor
- Coleman Bell
- William Bell
- Josh Bellamy
- Nick Bellore
- Dan Benish
- Donnell Bennett
- Cliff Benson
- Scott Bentley
- Tony Bergstrom
- Jordan Bernstine
- Ed Berrang
- Marv Berschet
- Ladell Betts
- Tyler Biadasz
- Kapri Bibbs
- Josh Bidwell
- Keiron Bigby
- E. J. Biggers
- Verlon Biggs
- Guy Bingham
- Keith Birlem
- Jordan Black
- Will Blackmon
- H. B. Blades
- Cary Blanchard
- Scott Blanton
- Chris Blewitt
- Fred Boensch
- Don Boll
- Chuck Bond
- Rink Bond
- Reggie Bonnafon
- Brian Bonner
- Dorian Boose
- Breon Borders
- Frank Bosch
- Ryan Boschetti
- Don Bosseler
- Jeff Bostic
- Jon Bostic
- Ben Boswell
- Marc Boutte
- Luke Bowanko
- Matt Bowen
- Stephen Bowen
- Larry Bowie
- Todd Bowles
- Deral Boykin
- Tom Braatz
- Hal Bradley
- Will Bradley-King
- Mike Bragg
- Bruce Branch
- Reggie Branch
- John Brandes
- David Brandt
- Caleb Brantley
- John Brantley
- Ed Breding
- Rod Breedlove
- Bashaud Breeland
- Billy Brewer
- Bill Briggs
- Bob Briggs
- Darrick Brilz
- Dezmon Briscoe
- Jacoby Brissett
- Gene Brito
- Eddie Britt
- Oscar Britt
- Bill Brooks
- Durant Brooks
- Ja'Corey Brooks
- Perry Brooks
- Reggie Brooks
- Nehemiah Broughton
- Antonio Brown
- Buddy Brown
- Charlie Brown
- Dan Brown
- Doug Brown
- Dyami Brown
- Eddie Brown
- Everette Brown
- Hardy Brown
- Jamie Brown
- Jammal Brown
- Larry Brown
- Mack Brown
- Michael Brown
- Noah Brown
- Ray Brown
- Rufus Brown
- Tom Brown
- Tony Brown
- Wilbert Brown
- Zach Brown
- Darrick Brownlow
- Charlie Brueckman
- Bill Brundige
- Mark Brunell
- Bob Brunet
- David Bruton
- Anthony Bryant
- Kelvin Bryant
- Trent Bryant
- Phillip Buchanon
- Jason Buck
- Curtis Buckley
- Frank Budd
- Danny Buggs
- Rudy Bukich
- George Buksar
- Derek Bunch
- Terrell Burgess
- Shawn Burks
- Treylon Burks
- George Burman
- Danny Burmeister
- Chester Burnett
- Curry Burns
- John Burrell
- Michael Burton
- Sam Busich
- Carl Butkus
- Crezdon Butler
- Percy Butler
- Harry Butsko
- Dave Butz
- Earnest Byner
- Dominique Byrd

== C ==
- George Cafego
- Lawrence Cager
- Ravin Caldwell
- Reche Caldwell
- Shaq Calhoun
- Jason Campbell
- Jesse Campbell
- Khary Campbell
- Matt Campbell
- Bob Campiglio
- Nick Campofreda
- Don Campora
- Trung Canidate
- Joe Caravello
- Mark Carlson
- Brian Carpenter
- Preston Carpenter
- Jimmy Carr
- Derek Carrier
- Mark Carrier
- Adam Carriker
- Jim Carroll
- Leo Carroll
- Vic Carroll
- Johnny Carson
- Alex Carter
- Andre Carter
- Chris Carter
- DeAndre Carter
- Ki-Jana Carter
- Tom Carter
- Rock Cartwright
- Rick Casares
- Rich Caster
- Jim Castiglia
- Tariq Castro-Fields
- Tyler Catalina
- Al Catanho
- Larry Centers
- Byron Chamberlain
- Jeff Chandler
- Sean Chandler
- Saahdiq Charles
- Martin Chase
- Camaron Cheeseman
- Hal Cherne
- Raphel Cherry
- Jehu Chesson
- Chris Chester
- George Cheverko
- Jeremy Chinn
- Tashard Choice
- Robbie Chosen
- Erik Christensen
- Geron Christian
- Donnis Churchwell
- Gene Cichowski
- Ed Cifers
- Frank Clair
- Rickey Claitt
- Algy Clark
- Devin Clark
- Gary Clark
- Jim Clark
- Mike Clark
- Ryan Clark
- Billy Clay
- Ozzie Clay
- T. J. Clemmings
- Chris Clemons
- Nic Clemons
- Gregory Clifton
- Ha Ha Clinton-Dix
- Jack Cloud
- Tom Cochran
- Joe Cofer
- Ken Coffey
- Barry Cofield
- Angelo Coia
- Ben Coleman
- Brandon Coleman
- Greg Coleman
- Marco Coleman
- Monte Coleman
- Laveranues Coles
- Jim Collier
- Andre Collins
- Landon Collins
- Paul Collins
- Shane Collins
- Todd Collins
- Aaron Colvin
- Tom Compton
- Will Compton
- Rick Concannon
- Merl Condit
- Josh Conerly Jr.
- Cary Conklin
- Red Conkright
- Albert Connell
- Mike Connell
- Brett Conway
- Anthony Cook
- Erik Cook
- Chris Cooley
- Jonathan Cooper
- Anthony Copeland
- Danny Copeland
- Don Corbitt
- José Cortez
- Sam Cosmi
- Al Couppee
- Kirk Cousins
- John Cowne
- Delbert Cowsette
- Bill Cox
- Jabril Cox
- Steve Cox
- Eric Coyle
- Claude Crabb
- River Cracraft
- Dennis Crane
- Su'a Cravens
- Richard Crawford
- Terry Crews
- Harold Crisler
- Cris Crissy
- Don Croftcheck
- Peter Cronan
- Gene Cronin
- Jacory Croskey-Merritt
- Dave Crossan
- Jim Crotty
- Orien Crow
- Jamison Crowder
- Buddy Crutchfield
- Walt Cudzik
- Chris Culliver
- Billy Cundiff
- Doug Cunningham
- Jerome Cunningham
- Jim Cunningham
- Kamren Curl
- Donté Curry
- Bobby Curtis
- Mike Curtis
- Travis Curtis
- Andy Cvercko

== D ==
- Bob Dahl
- Roland Dale
- Lional Dalton
- Calvin Daniels
- Jayden Daniels
- LeShun Daniels Jr.
- Phillip Daniels
- Ronald Darby
- Bernie Darre
- Ben Davidson
- Akeem Davis
- Andy Davis
- Brian Davis
- Carl Davis (born 1992)
- Fred Davis (born 1918)
- Fred Davis (born 1986)
- Ja'Gared Davis
- James Davis
- Jamin Davis
- Michael Davis
- Robert Davis
- Stephen Davis
- Thomas Davis Sr.
- Vernon Davis
- Wayne Davis
- Mike Davlin
- Eagle Day
- Sheldon Day
- Brian de la Puente
- Rufus Deal
- Fred Dean
- Vernon Dean
- Art DeCarlo
- Bill DeCorrevont
- Bob Dee
- Don Deeks
- Chris DeFrance
- Bob DeFruiter
- Michael Deiter
- Paul Dekker
- Dee Delaney
- Jerry DeLoach
- Jack Deloplaine
- Al DeMao
- Rick DeMulling
- Pat Dennis
- Glenn Dennison
- Moses Denson
- Tim Denton
- Darrell Dess
- Clint Didier
- John Didion
- Dahrran Diedrick
- Cris Dishman
- Derrick Dockery
- Josh Doctson
- Chris Doering
- Jason Doering
- Don Doll
- Rick Donnalley
- Jack Doolan
- Al Dorow
- Jahan Dotson
- Reed Doughty
- Jamil Douglas
- Ken Dow
- Harry Dowda
- Boyd Dowler
- Troy Drake
- Tyronne Drakeford
- Chuck Drazenovich
- Jeff Driskel
- Greg Dubinetz
- Phil DuBois
- T. J. Duckett
- Joe Duckworth
- Greg Ducre
- Bill Dudley
- Jamal Duff
- Fred Dugan
- Steve Duich
- Chad Dukes
- Quinton Dunbar
- Speedy Duncan
- Casey Dunn
- Coye Dunn
- K. D. Dunn
- Reggie Dupard
- Brad Dusek
- Jack Dwyer
- Les Dye
- Henry Dyer

== E ==
- Andrew East
- Ed Ecker
- Chase Edmonds
- Brad Edwards
- Turk Edwards
- Weldon Edwards
- Clyde Ehrhardt
- Milo Eifler
- Pat Eilers
- Austin Ekeler
- Corn Elder
- MO Elewonibi
- Henry Ellard
- Matt Elliott
- Ed Ellis
- Swede Ellstrom
- Doug Elmore
- Leo Elter
- Steve Emtman
- Bud Ericksen
- Alex Erickson
- Mickey Erickson
- Zach Ertz
- Ricky Ervins
- Mike Espy
- David Etherly
- John Eubanks
- Charlie Evans
- Demetric Evans
- Greg Evans
- Josh Evans
- Leomont Evans
- Reggie Evans
- Deshazor Everett

== F ==
- Jason Fabini
- George Fant
- Mike Fanucci
- Andy Farkas
- Dick Farman
- Tom Farmer
- Jimmy Farris
- Jeff Faulkner
- Christian Fauria
- Wiley Feagin
- Fred Felber
- Ralph Felton
- Josh Ferguson
- Clelin Ferrell
- Neil Ferris
- Carlos Fields
- Frank Filchock
- Alfred Fincher
- Dave Fiore
- Al Fiorentino
- Mark Fischer
- Pat Fischer
- Bob Fisher
- Ryan Fitzpatrick
- Matt Flanagan
- Zeron Flemister
- Derrick Fletcher
- London Fletcher
- Tom Flick
- Mike Flores
- Ereck Flowers
- Michael Floyd
- Vern Foltz
- Kai Forbath
- Emmanuel Forbes
- Darrick Forrest
- Ike Forte
- Mason Foster
- Robert Foster
- Dante Fowler
- Keyaron Fox
- Vernon Fox
- Dion Foxx
- Dick Frahm
- Todd Frain
- A. J. Francis
- Dave Francis
- James Francis
- Ike Frankian
- Orlando Franklin
- Todd Franz
- Frank Frazier
- Bobby Freeman
- Gus Frerotte
- Lennie Friedman
- John Friesz
- David Frisch
- Ted Fritsch Jr.
- Derrick Frost
- Irving Fryar
- Brian Fryer
- Jean Fugett
- Bill Fulcher
- Kendall Fuller
- Kyle Fuller
- Larry Fuller

== G ==
- Jabar Gaffney
- Jim Gaffney
- Steve Gage
- William Gaines
- Scott Galbraith
- Junior Galette
- Joey Galloway
- Antonio Gandy-Golden
- Rich Gannon
- Graham Gano
- Quinton Ganther
- Pierre Garçon
- Daryl Gardener
- Rod Gardner
- Dwight Garner
- Joshua Garnett
- Alvin Garrett
- Terence Garvin
- Mike Garzoni
- Nick Gates
- Matt Gay (born 1994)
- Clifton Geathers
- Jumpy Geathers
- Justin Geisinger
- Lee Gentry
- Jeff George
- Jim German
- Nate Gerry
- John Gesek
- Adam Gettis
- Nick Giaquinto
- Alec Gibson
- Antonio Gibson
- Joe Gibson
- Garrett Gilbert
- Sean Gilbert
- Harry Gilmer
- Reggie Givens
- Gary Glick
- Art Gob
- Randall Godfrey
- Charlie Gogolak
- Eddie Goldman
- Dashon Goldson
- Kedric Golston
- DeJon Gomes
- Zane Gonzalez
- Julian Good-Jones
- Kelly Goodburn
- Rob Goode
- Clyde Goodnight
- John Goodyear
- Tom Goosby
- Derrick Gore
- Kurt Gouveia
- Dave Graf
- Rick Graf
- Don Graham
- Kent Graham
- Alan Grant
- Bob Grant
- Darryl Grant
- Frank Grant
- Orantes Grant
- Ryan Grant (born 1982)
- Ryan Grant (born 1990)
- Bill Gray
- Darrell Green
- Donny Green
- Jacquez Green
- Mike Green
- Robert Green
- Tony Green
- Trent Green
- Donovan Greer
- Cedric Griffin
- Cornelius Griffin
- Keith Griffin
- Robert Griffin III
- Dan Grimm
- Russ Grimm
- Andy Groom
- Rex Grossman
- Ralph Guglielmi
- Derrius Guice
- David Gulledge
- Jose Gumbs
- Herman Gundlach

== H ==
- Dale Hackbart
- Fred Hageman
- Mike Haight
- Kris Haines
- Ali Haji-Sheikh
- Dick Haley
- Jermaine Haley
- DeAngelo Hall
- Galen Hall
- John Hall
- Windlan Hall
- Derrick Ham
- Gibran Hamdan
- Dean Hamel
- Antonio Hamilton
- Justin Hamilton
- Malcolm Hamilton
- Rick Hamilton
- Shaun Dion Hamilton
- Steve Hamilton
- Gene Hamlin
- Je'Ron Hamm
- Bobby Hammond
- Dominique Hampton
- Chris Hanburger
- Mike Hancock
- Leonard Hankerson
- Zip Hanna
- Brian Hansen
- Ron Hansen
- Dave Harbour
- Buddy Hardeman
- Cecil Hare
- Ray Hare
- Jim Harlan
- Clarence Harmon
- Kelvin Harmon
- George Harold
- Alvin Harper
- Charley Harraway
- De'Jon Harris
- Don Harris
- Hank Harris
- Jalen Harris
- Jeremy Harris
- Jimmy Harris
- Joe Harris
- Macho Harris
- Maurice Harris
- Rickie Harris
- Walt Harris
- Will Harris
- Kenny Harrison
- Lloyd Harrison
- Nolan Harrison
- Carl Harry
- Jim Hart
- Howard Hartley
- Bill Hartman
- Ken Harvey
- Josh Harvey-Clemons
- Allen Harvin
- Dwayne Haskins
- Tim Hasselbeck
- Jason Hatcher
- Ron Hatcher
- Len Hauss
- Tre Hawkins
- Kurt Haws
- D. J. Hayden
- Ken Hayden
- Jeff Hayes
- Alvin Haymond
- Hall Haynes
- Reggie Haynes
- Albert Haynesworth
- Adam Hayward
- Ted Hazelwood
- Leon Heath
- Andy Heck
- Norb Hecker
- Pat Heenan
- Bill Hegarty
- Taylor Heinicke
- Bob Heinz
- Roy Helu
- Temarrick Hemingway
- Larry Hendershot
- Jon Henderson
- Bob Hendren
- Jerry Hennessy
- KJ Henry
- Robert Henson
- Hale Hentges
- Kris Heppner
- Terry Hermeling
- Joe Hernandez
- Treyvon Hester
- Stephon Heyer
- Dallas Hickman
- Donnie Hickman
- Artis Hicks
- Skip Hicks
- Tim Hightower
- Calvin Hill
- Irv Hill
- Ray Hitchcock
- Terry Hoage
- Stephen Hobbs
- Pat Hodgson
- David Hoelscher
- Bob Hoffman
- John Hoffman
- Steve Hokuf
- Cole Holcomb
- Warrick Holdman
- John Hollar
- Vonnie Holliday
- Lamont Hollinquest
- Derek Holloway
- Bob Holly
- Walter Holman
- Willie Holman
- Walt Holmer
- Christian Holmes
- Jalyn Holmes
- Lendy Holmes
- Bernard Holsey
- Joshua Holsey
- J. P. Holtz
- Ziggy Hood
- Dustin Hopkins
- Sam Horner
- Roy Horstmann
- Chris Horton
- Ethan Horton
- Jeff Hostetler
- Jerry Houghton
- Ken Houston
- Walt Houston
- Don Hover
- Austin Howard
- Desmond Howard
- Dixie Howell
- Sam Howell
- Bob Hudson
- Khaleke Hudson
- Ken Huff
- Sam Huff
- Hank Hughes
- George Hughley
- Josh Hull
- Mike Hull
- Adam Humphries
- Stan Humphries
- Billy Hunter
- Greg Huntington
- George Hurley
- Maurice Hurt
- Todd Husak
- Michael Husted
- Tony Hutson
- Fred Hyatt

== I ==
- Noah Igbinoghene
- Duke Ihenacho
- Martin Imhof
- Dontrelle Inman
- Marne Intrieri
- Matt Ioannidis
- Don Irwin
- Keith Ismael
- George Izo

== J ==
- Chris Jacke
- Bernard Jackson
- Charles Jackson
- DeSean Jackson
- Drake Jackson
- LaDairis Jackson
- Leroy Jackson
- Rob Jackson
- Steve Jackson
- T. J. Jackson
- Wilbur Jackson
- William Jackson III
- Willie Jackson
- Jack Jacobs
- Taylor Jacobs
- Joe Jacoby
- John Jaffurs
- Harry Jagielski
- Dick James
- Erasmus James
- Vic Janowicz
- Jon Jansen
- Jon Jaqua
- Jeremy Jarmon
- Craig Jarrett
- Kyshoen Jarrett
- Javontae Jean-Baptiste
- Ricky Jean Francois
- Jackson Jeffcoat
- Roy Jefferson
- Bob Jencks
- Brandon Jenkins
- Cullen Jenkins
- Jack Jenkins
- James Jenkins
- Jarvis Jenkins
- Ken Jenkins
- Marcel Jensen
- Tim Jessie
- Donovan Jeter
- Ade Jimoh
- A. J. Johnson
- Billy "White Shoes" Johnson
- Brad Johnson
- Brian Johnson
- Bryan Johnson
- D. J. Johnson
- Danny Johnson
- Dennis Johnson
- Jeron Johnson
- Jimmie Johnson
- Joe Johnson
- Josh Johnson
- Larry Johnson (born 1909)
- Larry Johnson (born 1979)
- Mitch Johnson
- Patrick Johnson
- Randy Johnson
- Richard Johnson
- Rob Johnson
- Robert Johnson
- Sidney Johnson
- Tim Johnson
- Tre' Johnson
- Jimmy Johnston
- Aki Jones
- Andre Jones Jr.
- Anthony Jones
- Arthur Jones
- Charley Jones
- David Jones (born 1961)
- David Jones (born 1985)
- Deacon Jones
- Greg Jones
- Harvey Jones
- Jacoby Jones (born 2001)
- Jimmie Jones
- Joe Jones
- Jonathan Jones
- Kenyatta Jones
- Larry Jones
- Levi Jones
- Matt Jones
- Melvin Jones
- Robert Jones
- Stan Jones
- Akeem Jordan
- Curtis Jordan
- Jeff Jordan
- Greg Joseph
- Joe Joseph
- Ricot Joseph
- Steve Junker
- Trey Junkin
- Sonny Jurgensen
- Charlie Justice
- Ed Justice
- Steve Juzwik

== Ka-Ke ==
- Ed Kahn
- Ale Kaho
- N. D. Kalu
- Carl Kammerer
- Jim Kamp
- Rick Kane
- Joe Kantor
- George Karamatic
- Emil Karas
- Jim Karcher
- Lou Karras
- Ted Karras Jr.
- Mike Katrishen
- Mel Kaufman
- Ed Kawal
- Frank Kearse
- Zak Keasey
- Chris Keating
- Jack Keenan
- Case Keenum
- Bryan Kehl
- Rick Kehr
- Gorden Kelley
- Robert Kelley
- John Kelly
- Kyu Blu Kelly
- Malcolm Kelly
- Maʻake Kemoeatu
- Pete Kendall
- Mychal Kendricks
- George Kenneally
- Zac Kerin
- Jim Kerr
- Ryan Kerrigan
