= 1931 All-Eastern football team =

American all-star college football team

The 1931 All-Eastern football team consists of American football players chosen by various selectors as the best players at each position among the Eastern colleges and universities during the 1931 college football season.

Four players were named to the first team by the Associated Press, United Press, and Central Press Association. They were quarterback Barry Wood of Harvard; end John Orsi of Colgate; guard Jim Zyntell of Holy Cross; and center Ralph Daugherty of Pittsburgh.

== All-Eastern selections ==
=== Quarterbacks ===
- Barry Wood, Harvard (AP-1, UP-1, CP)
- Bill Morton, Dartmouth (AP-2, UP-2)
- Helitt, Columbia (UP-3)

=== Halfbacks ===
- Bart Viviano, Cornell (AP-1, UP-1)
- Jim Murphy, Fordham (AP-2, UP-2, CP)
- Albie Booth, Yale (AP-1)
- Ray Stecker, Army (UP-1)
- Joe Moran, Syracuse (CP)
- Bill McCall, Dartmouth (AP-2, UP-3)
- John Crickard, Harvard (UP-2)
- John Grossman, Rutgers (UP-3)

=== Fullbacks ===
- Clarke Hinkle, Bucknell (AP-1, UP-1)
- Carl Perina, Penn (AP-2, UP-2, CP)
- John Ferraro, Cornell (UP-3)

=== Ends ===
- John Orsi, Colgate (AP-1, UP-1, CP)
- Paul Riblett, Penn (AP-1, UP-1)
- Herster Barres, Yale (CP, UP-2)
- James Cavalieri, Holy Cross (AP-2, UP-2)
- Cristobal Martinez-Zorilla, Cornell (AP-2, UP-3)
- Joseph Hugret, NYU (UP-3)

=== Tackles ===
- John Price, Army (AP-1, UP-1, CP)
- Jess Quatse, Pittsburgh (UP-1, CP)
- James MacMurdo, Pittsburgh (AP-1, UP-2)
- Irad Hardy, Harvard (AP-2, UP-2)
- Howard Colehower, Penn (AP-2, UP-3)
- Rick Concannon, NYU (UP-3)

=== Guards ===
- Jim Zyntell, Holy Cross (AP-1, UP-1, CP)
- Henry Myerson, Harvard (AP-1, UP-2)
- Stephen Grenda, Columbia (UP-1)
- Bill Hoffman, Dartmouth (CP)
- Milton Summerfelt, Army (AP-2, UP-3)
- Trice, Army (AP-2, UP-2)
- Maurice Dubofsky, Georgetown (UP-3)

=== Centers ===
- Ralph Daugherty, Pittsburgh (AP-1, UP-1, CP)
- William McDuffee, Columbia (AP-2, UP-2)
- George Chalmers, NYU (UP-3)

== Key ==
- AP = Associated Press
- UP = United Press
- CP = Central Press Association, selected by the football captains of the Eastern teams

== See also ==
- 1931 College Football All-America Team
