= Frank Walton =

Frank Walton may refer to:

- Frank Walton (American football) (1911–1953), American football guard and coach
- Frank Walton (philatelist) (1955–2022), British philatelist
- Frank Walton (footballer) (1918–1986), English footballer
- Fuzzy Walton (1912–1973), American Negro league baseball player
