= Joe Krakoski =

Joe Krakoski may refer to:

- Joe Krakoski (defensive back) (born 1937), former American player for the Washington Redskins and Oakland Raiders
- Joe Krakoski (linebacker) (born 1962), former American football player for the Washington Redskins
