= Leonard Macaluso =

American football player and professional wrestler

Colgate Raiders
- Position: Fullback

Personal information
- Born: April 5, 1907; Philadelphia, Pennsylvania, U.S.
- Died: August 27, 1988 (aged 81)

Career information
- College: Colgate (1930)

Awards and highlights
- Consensus All-American (1930); First-team All-Eastern (1930)

Leonard Donald "Iron Legs" Macaluso (April 5, 1907 – August 27, 1988) was an American football player and wrestler. He played fullback for Colgate University from 1928 to 1930. Macaluso was the leading scorer among the major college teams in 1930 (145 points) and was one of two players (Ben Ticknor was the other) to be virtually unanimous choices as a first-team All-Eastern player. He was also selected as a first-team All-American in 1930 by the Associated Press, United Press, Colliers, International News Service (INS), New York Evening Post, and New York Sun." Macaluso later became a professional wrestler, competing under the name "Iron Legs" Macaluso.

Macaluso was born in Philadelphia on April 5, 1907. He died on August 27, 1988 at the age of 81.

== See also ==
- List of NCAA major college football yearly scoring leaders
