= Doug Russell =

Doug Russell may refer to:

- Doug Russell (swimmer) (born 1946), American former Olympic swimmer
- Doug Russell (American football) (1912–1995), American football player
