= Cornelius Murphy =

Cornelius or Connie Murphy may refer to:

- Cornelius Murphy (American football) (1909–1931), American football player
- Cornelius B. Murphy Jr., American environmental science professor
- Connie Murphy (baseball) (1870–1945), American Major League Baseball catcher
- Connie Murphy (Gaelic footballer) (born 1965), Irish Gaelic footballer
