= Mike Clark (defensive end) =

American football player (born 1959)

No. 75, 90, 79
- Position: Defensive end

Personal information
- Born: March 30, 1959 (age 67); Dothan, Alabama, U.S.
- Listed height: 6 ft 4 in (1.93 m)
- Listed weight: 253 lb (115 kg)

Career information
- High school: Graceville (Graceville, Florida)
- College: Florida
- NFL draft: 1981: 7th round, 190 (by the Los Angeles Rams)th overall pick

Career history
- Los Angeles Rams (1981)*; Washington Redskins (1981); San Francisco 49ers (1982); Tampa Bay Bandits (1984-1985); Tampa Bay Buccaneers (1987); Chicago Bruisers (1988)
- * Offseason or practice squad member only

Career USFL statistics
- Sacks: 12.5
- Stats at Pro Football Reference
- Stats at ArenaFan.com

Michael Hugh Clark (born March 30, 1959) is an American former professional football player who was a defensive end for five seasons in the National Football League (NFL) and United States Football League (USFL) during the 1980s. Clark played college football for the Florida Gators, and thereafter, he played professionally for the Washington Redskins, the San Francisco 49ers and the Tampa Bay Buccaneers of the NFL, and the Tampa Bay Bandits of the USFL.

== Early life ==
Clark was born in Dothan, Alabama, in 1959. He attended Graceville High School in Graceville, Florida, where he played high school football for the Graceville Tigers.

== College career ==
Clark accepted an athletic scholarship to attend the University of Florida in Gainesville, Florida, and played for coach Doug Dickey and coach Charley Pell's Gators teams from 1977 to 1980. During Clark's senior season in 1980, he was a member of the Gators team that posted the biggest one-year turnaround in the history of NCAA Division I football—from 0–10–1 in 1979 to an 8–4 bowl team in 1980.

== Professional career ==
The Los Angeles Rams selected Clark in the seventh round (190th pick overall) of the 1981 NFL draft. Clark played a single season for each of the Washington Redskins in 1981, the San Francisco 49ers in 1982, and the Tampa Bay Buccaneers in 1987. Clark was also a starting defensive end for coach Steve Spurrier's Tampa Bay Bandits of the USFL in 1984 and 1985.

== Life after football ==
Clark is retired from professional sports and lives in Tampa, Florida. He has one daughter.

== See also ==
- Florida Gators football, 1970–79
- Florida Gators football, 1980–89
- History of the San Francisco 49ers
- History of the Tampa Bay Buccaneers
- List of Florida Gators in the NFL draft
- List of Washington Redskins players
