= Ron Tilton =

American football player (born 1963)

No. 76
- Position: Guard

Personal information
- Born: August 9, 1963 (age 63); Homestead, Florida, U.S.
- Listed height: 6 ft 4 in (1.93 m)
- Listed weight: 250 lb (113 kg)

Career information
- High school: Tampa (FL) Plant
- College: Florida; Tulane
- NFL draft: 1986: undrafted

Career history
- Washington Redskins (1986); New York Jets (1988)*
- * Offseason or practice squad member only

Career NFL statistics
- Games played: 7
- Stats at Pro Football Reference

Ronald John Tilton (born August 9, 1963) is an American former professional football player who was a guard in the National Football League (NFL) for a single season in 1986. Tilton played college football for the Florida Gators and Tulane Green Wave, and thereafter, he played in the NFL for the Washington Redskins.

== Early life ==
Tilton was born in Homestead, Florida. He attended Plant High School in Tampa, Florida, where he played high school football for the Plant Panthers.

== College career ==
Tilton attended the University of Florida in Gainesville, Florida, where he played for coach Charley Pell's Gators teams in 1981 and 1982. Tilton transferred to Tulane University in New Orleans, Louisiana, and played his final two college seasons for the Green Wave in 1984 and 1985.

== Professional career ==
Tilton was not selected in the 1986 NFL draft. The Washington Redskins signed him as an undrafted free agent, and he played for the Redskins for a single season in 1986, appearing in seven games.

== See also ==
- Florida Gators football, 1980–89
- List of Washington Redskins players
