= Albie Booth =

American football player (1908–1959)

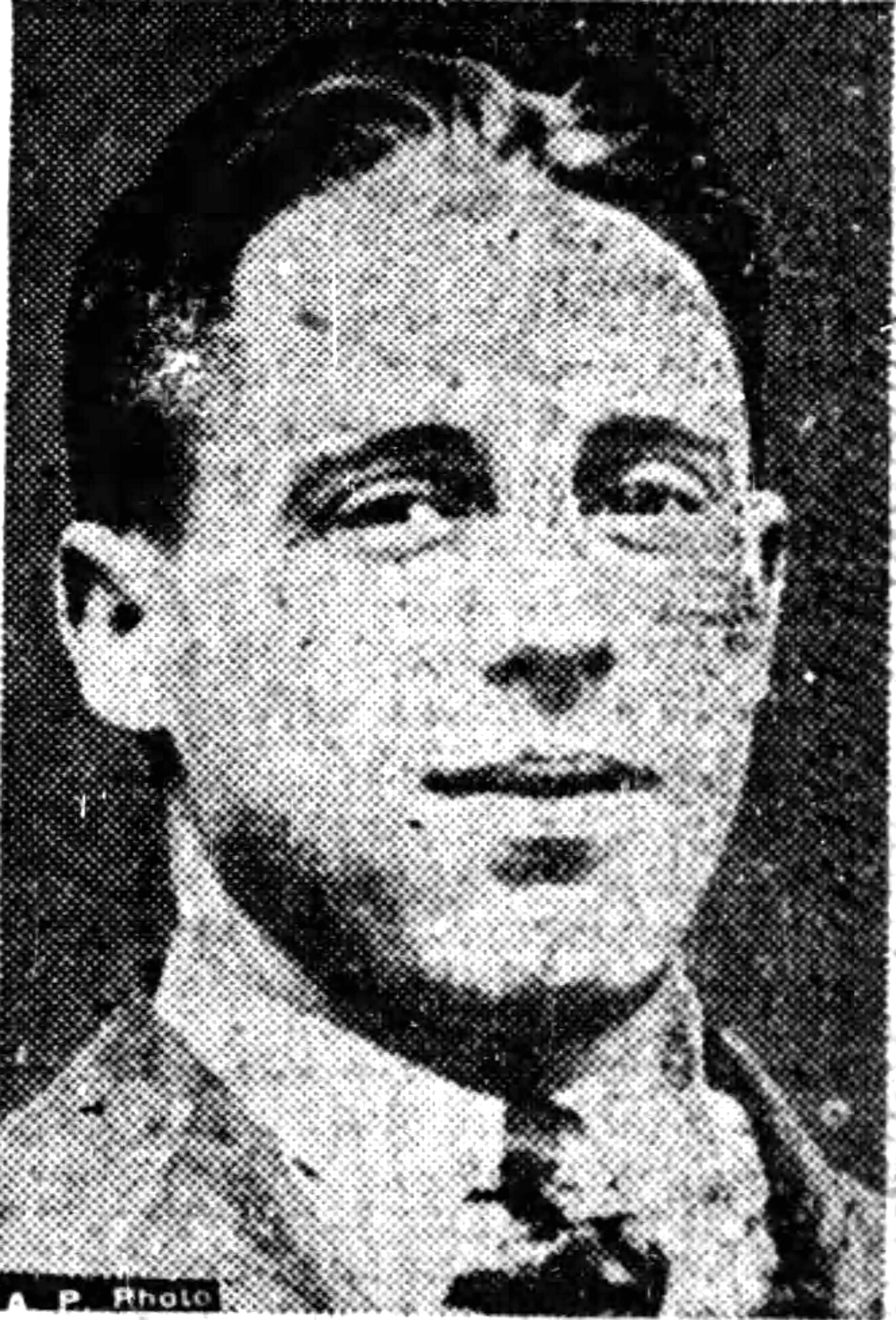
- portrait photograph, circa 1929

Yale Bulldogs
- Position: Halfback

Personal information
- Born: February 1, 1908; New Haven, Connecticut, U.S.
- Died: March 1, 1959 (aged 51); New York City, New York, U.S.
- Listed height: 5 ft 6 in (1.68 m)
- Listed weight: 144 lb (65 kg)

Career information
- College: Yale (1929–1931)

Awards and highlights
- Second-team All-American (1930); Third-team All-American (1929); 3× First-team All-Eastern (1929, 1930, 1931)
- College Football Hall of Fame

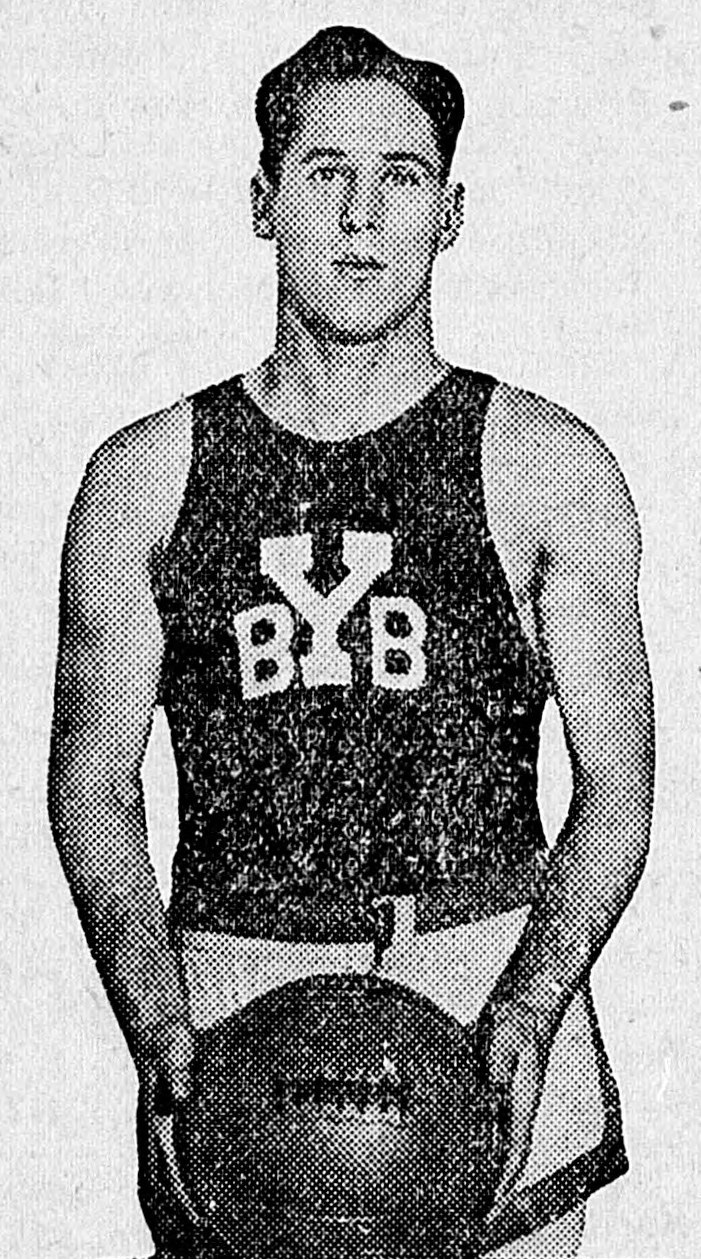
booth in uniform for Yale Basketball, circa 1931

Albert James "Albie" Booth (February 1, 1908 – March 1, 1959) was an American football player. He was a star at Yale University from 1929 to 1931, and was elected to the College Football Hall of Fame in 1966.

Booth, at only 5 feet 6 inches (1.68 m) tall and 144 pounds (65 kg), was known as "Little Boy Blue" and the "Mighty Atom", and sportswriters compared him to the fictional Yale sports hero Frank Merriwell. A New Haven, Connecticut, native, he attended Hillhouse High School (as well as Milford Academy) before coming to Yale, where he was a hometown favorite. In the single wing offense of Yale coach Mal Stevens, Booth played the tailback position and was also the team's kicker.

Booth became famous in 1929, his sophomore year, after a spectacular performance against Army. Booth, not yet a regular starter, entered the game with Yale losing 13–0, and proceeded to rush for 233 yards and score all of Yale's points (2 rushing touchdowns, a 65-yard punt return touchdown, and 3 extra point kicks), leading Yale to a 21–13 upset win. Newsreels reported the game with the caption, "Booth 21, Army 13".

Against Army the following year, while playing defense early in the game, Booth intercepted an Army pass, but was then swarmed by Army tacklers and injured so severely he had to be carried off on a stretcher, and the teams played to a tie. (Yale architecture professor Vincent Scully, a devoted football fan since his childhood, has claimed that Army intentionally threw the interception to Booth so that the Army players could then injure him and put him out of the game.) Hampered by injuries during his junior year, Booth returned to form as a senior. He scored 3 touchdowns against Dartmouth in a 33–33 tie (the highest scoring tie in college football history at that time). His last game was against Harvard, with both teams entering "The Game" undefeated for the first time since 1913. Neither team scored until Booth kicked a late-game drop kick field goal to win 3–0, finally prevailing in his third attempt to beat Harvard's varsity team and its star quarterback Barry Wood. Exhausted from the season, Booth was in a hospital with pleurisy while his teammates routed Princeton 51–14 in the final game, inspired in part by a telegram from Booth that was delivered to the Yale bench shortly before halftime.

Booth was also a basketball and baseball star at Yale. After recovering from pleurisy, in spring 1932, he hit a two-out grand slam home run to beat the Harvard baseball team 4–3.

In 1932, Booth married Marion Noble, his childhood sweetheart. After college Booth coached football, played semi-professional baseball and basketball, worked as a football referee, and worked for an ice-cream manufacturer in New Haven. He died of a heart attack in 1959 at the age of 51.
