= Barry Wood (American football) =

American football player and medical educator (1910–1971)

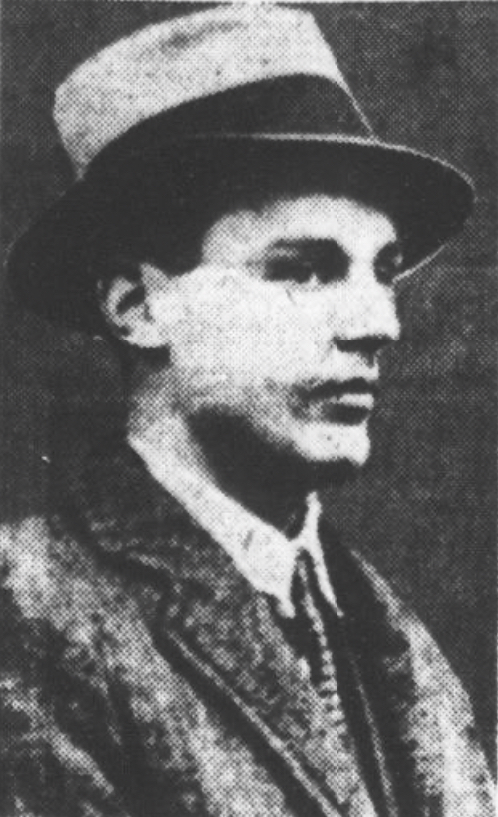
- Wood in a 1932 publication of The Washington Times

Profile
- Position: quarterback

Personal information
- Born: May 4, 1910; Milton, Massachusetts, US
- Died: March 9, 1971 (aged 60); Jamaica Plain, Boston, Massachusetts, US

Career information
- College: Harvard University (1929–1931)

Awards and highlights
- Consensus All-American (1931); Second-team All-American (1929); First-team All-Eastern (1931)
- College Football Hall of Fame

William Barry Wood Jr. (May 4, 1910 – March 9, 1971) was an American football player and medical educator. Wood played quarterback for Harvard during the 1929–1931 seasons and was one of the most prominent football players of his time. He was elected to the College Football Hall of Fame in 1980. Following his football career, Wood pursued a career in medicine and microbiology, holding academic positions at Washington University in St. Louis and Johns Hopkins University. His son, William Barry Wood III (1938-2024), was a molecular biologist who was elected to the National Academy of Sciences.

== Early life ==
Wood was born on May 4, 1910, in Milton, Massachusetts. His father was a Harvard graduate and trustee. He attended Milton Academy. After graduating, he spent a year at The Thacher School in California, then entered Harvard in 1928.

== Athletic and extracurricular career at Harvard ==
A multitalented athlete, Wood earned a total of ten varsity letters at Harvard: three each in football, hockey, and baseball, plus one in tennis.

Wood first made his national reputation as a sophomore in 1929, when he led Harvard to a comeback 20-20 tie with Army: Wood threw a 40-yard touchdown pass and drop-kicked two extra points, including the kick to tie the game at the end. Michigan's Fielding H. Yost called Wood in 1929 the greatest passer he had ever seen.

In Wood's senior year, 1931, he was team captain. In one noted game, Harvard came back from a 13-0 deficit to beat Army 14-13 as Wood led two touchdown drives, and made two crucial defensive plays (a touchdown-saving tackle and an interception) to save the win. He appeared on the cover of the November 23, 1931 issue of Time magazine. He was the consensus first-team quarterback as selected by most of the 1931 College Football All-America Teams.

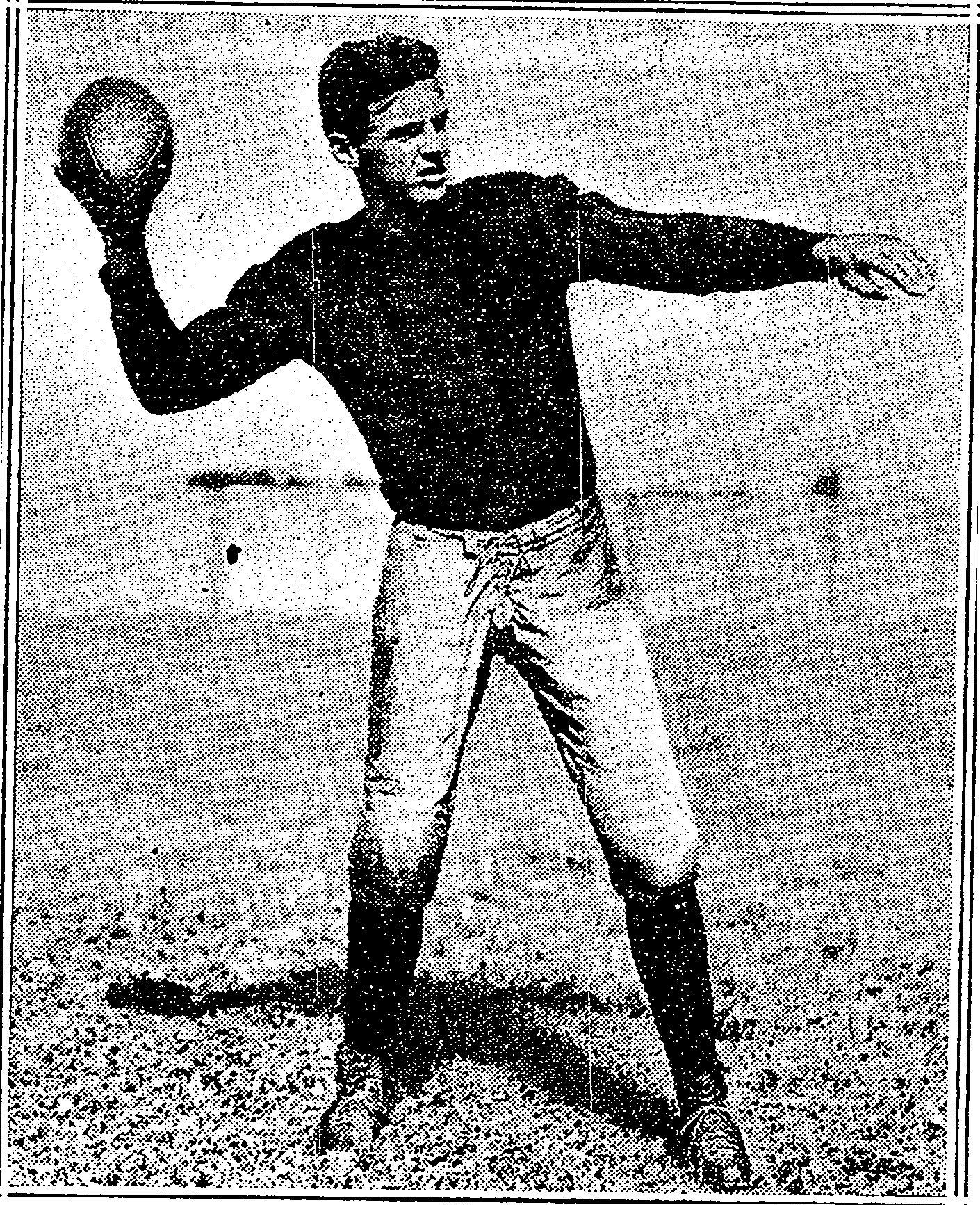
Wood as Harvard quarterback, 1929

Wood was at the center of a controversy involving the famous sportscaster Ted Husing. Commenting on Wood's poor play in the 1931 Harvard-Dartmouth game, Husing opined, "Wood is certainly playing a putrid game today." Two plays later, Wood threw the winning touchdown pass in Harvard's 7–6 win. Harvard fans protested Husing's use of the word "putrid", and the Harvard athletic director notified Husing's boss, William S. Paley at CBS, that Husing would be banned from broadcasting Harvard home games.

Wood was well known for his role in Harvard's rivalry with Yale, which was led by its own three-sport star, Albie Booth. In the words of the 1931 Time article, "the essence of Harvard football this year, as Booth has been the essence of Yale football since his sophomore year, is William Barry Wood Jr., called "Barry" by sportswriters and "Bill" by friends." When the two met for the first time as freshmen, Yale's freshman team beat Harvard's 7–6. Harvard beat Yale in Wood's sophomore and junior years. The Crimson won the 1929 game 10-6 as Wood drop-kicked a field goal and an extra point. Booth, suffering from a leg injury, did not start and had a second-quarter field goal attempt blocked, although he did later throw a touchdown pass for Yale's only points; Booth also nearly took a second-half kickoff return 96 yards for the potential winning score, before Harvard's Hall of Fame center Ben Ticknor managed to tackle him from behind by grabbing his sweater. In 1930, the Harvard defense stymied Booth while Wood threw two touchdown passes, leading Harvard to a 13-0 win. In 1931, The Game" neither team scored until Booth kicked a late-game drop kick field goal to win 3–0, for Wood's only varsity football loss to Yale in three games. Wood and Booth picked up their rivalry in the spring, and Booth had the last word, hitting a two-out grand slam home run to beat Wood and the Harvard baseball team 4–3. Wood was elected to the College Football Hall of Fame in 1980.

Wood was president of the student council, elected to Phi Beta Kappa, and graduated summa cum laude.

== Medical career ==
Wood was also a leader off the field, praised as a model student-athlete by celebrated writers of the day such as Westbrook Pegler and Damon Runyon. He was class president as a freshman and student council president as a senior, and he graduated summa cum laude and Phi Beta Kappa in 1932. After college, he went on to study medicine at Johns Hopkins Medical School in Baltimore, Maryland. In 1932, he married Mary Lee Hutchins. To earn money for medical school, he wrote a book entitled What Price Football – A Player's Defense of the Game.

Wood earned his medical degree in 1936. He was a National Research Council Fellow in bacteriology at Harvard, then returned to Hopkins in 1940 as a faculty member. In 1942, at the age of 32, he became head of the Department of Medicine at Washington University in St. Louis and physician-in-charge at Barnes Hospital. He remained in St. Louis for 13 years, then returned to Hopkins in 1955 as vice president of the university and hospital, and as a professor of microbiology. In 1959, he became director of the department of microbiology, and remained in that post until his death in 1971.

Beginning in his undergraduate days, Wood had developed an interest in the role of leukocytes that continued through his career. Wood was an early participant in the Army Epidemiological Board. He was part of a group that published an early paper on penicillin in 1943. He worked on the mechanism of recovery from pneumonia and was noted for early work on surface phagocytosis, research into the pathogenesis of fever, and endogenous pyrogen (now known as interleukin-1).

Wood wrote more than 125 papers and several books, including co-authorship of a microbiology textbook. He was elected to the National Academy of Sciences in 1959. He served as president or a board member of numerous professional organizations, including the Central Society for Clinical Research, the American Society for Clinical Investigation, and the Association of American Physicians. He was a member of the Harvard Board of Overseers, the Board of Trustees of the Rockefeller Foundation, and the President's Science Advisory Committee. He received a Distinguished Achievement Award from Modern Medicine and a posthumous Kober Medal from the Association of American Physicians.

Wood died on March 9, 1971, aged 60, in Jamaica Plain. Shortly before his death, an interview with Wood was videotaped for a documentary motion picture in the Leaders in American Medicine series produced by the medical honor society, Alpha Omega Alpha. The Wood Basic Science Building at Hopkins is named in his honor.
