= Joe Kurth =

American football player (1907–1987)

No. 28, 31
- Position: Tackle

Personal information
- Born: January 23, 1907; Waunakee, Wisconsin, U.S.
- Died: January 6, 1987 (aged 79); Richardson, Texas, U.S.
- Listed height: 6 ft 1 in (1.85 m)
- Listed weight: 202 lb (92 kg)

Career information
- High school: Madison East (Madison, Wisconsin)
- College: Wisconsin; Notre Dame

Career history
- Green Bay Packers (1933–1934)

Awards and highlights
- Unanimous All-American (1932); First-team All-American (1931)

Career statistics
- Games played: 20
- Games started: 12
- Stats at Pro Football Reference

Joseph James Kurth (January 23, 1907 – January 6, 1987) was an American football tackle for the Green Bay Packers of the National Football League (NFL). He played college football for Wisconsin and Notre Dame where he was named a unanimous All-American in 1932.

== Early life and college career ==
Kurth was born on January 23, 1907, in Waunakee, Wisconsin. He attended Madison East High School in Madison, Wisconsin.

He played college football for Wisconsin and Notre Dame. While at Notre Dame in 1932 he was named as an All-American.

== Professional career ==
Following his All-American campaign in 1932 he signed with the Green Bay Packers of the National Football League (NFL). In two years with the team he played in twenty games and started twelve. After his football career, Joe found employment with Kayser Motors, Inc. (now Kayser Ford) in Madison, WI.
