= Washington Commanders all-time roster =

The Washington Commanders all-time roster is split by name into the following two lists:

- Washington Commanders all-time roster (A–Ke)
- Washington Commanders all-time roster (Kh–Z)
