= Warren Heller =

American football player (1910–1982)

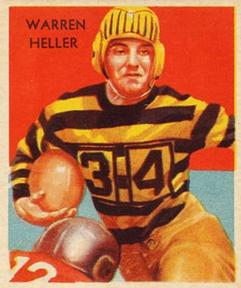

No. 34, 15, 1
- Position: Halfback

Personal information
- Born: November 24, 1910; Pittsburgh, Pennsylvania, U.S.
- Died: October 25, 1982 (aged 71); Oakmont, Pennsylvania, U.S.

Career information
- College: Pittsburgh

Career history
- Pittsburgh Pirates (1934–1936)

Awards and highlights
- Unanimous All-American (1932); First-team All-Eastern (1932)

Career statistics
- Rushing yards: 972
- Rushing average: 3.5
- Rushing touchdowns: 1
- Receptions: 20
- Receiving yards: 272
- Receiving touchdowns: 3
- Stats at Pro Football Reference

Warren Willis Heller (November 24, 1910 – October 29, 1982) was an American professional football player who played three seasons in the National Football League (NFL) with the Pittsburgh Pirates from 1934 to 1936.

Coach Dr. Sutherland observed, "The greatest all-around halfback I ever had the pleasure to coach was Warren Heller. "I saw better runners and passers, but for blocking, general defensive ability and ability to fire the spirit of a team, Heller was peer."
