= 1932 All-Big Six Conference football team =

The 1932 All-Big Six Conference football team consists of American football players chosen by various organizations for All-Big Six Conference teams for the 1932 college football season. The selectors for the 1932 season included the Associated Press (AP).

== All-Big Six selections ==
=== Backs ===
- Bob Dunlap, Oklahoma (AP-1 [QB])
- Elmer Schaake, Kansas (AP-1 [HB])
- Ralph Graham, Kansas State (AP-1 [HB])
- George Sauer, Nebraska (AP-1 [FB])
- Bernie Masterson, Nebraska (AP-2)
- Chris Mathis, Nebraska (AP-2)
- Dick Grefe, Iowa State (AP-2)
- Doug Russell, Kansas State (AP-2)

=== Ends ===
- Steve Hokuf (AP-1)
- Charles Schiele, Nebraska (AP-1)
- Leo Penney, Nebraska (AP-2)
- Smith Watkins, Oklahoma (AP-2)

=== Tackles ===
- Corwin Hulbert, Nebraska (AP-1)
- Peter Mehringer, Kansas (AP-1)
- Percy Gill, Missouri (AP-2)
- Neil Weybrew, Kansas State (AP-2)

=== Guards ===
- George Atkeson, Kansas (AP-1)
- Walter Zeckser, Kansas State (AP-1)
- Walter DeBus, Nebraska (AP-2)
- Ellis Bashara, Oklahoma (AP-2)

=== Centers ===
- Lawrence Ely, Nebraska (AP-1)
- Paul Young, Oklahoma (AP-2)

== Key ==
AP = Associated Press

== See also ==
- 1932 College Football All-America Team
