= Greenfield High School (Massachusetts) =

Coordinates: 42°36′19.53″N 72°35′42.41″W

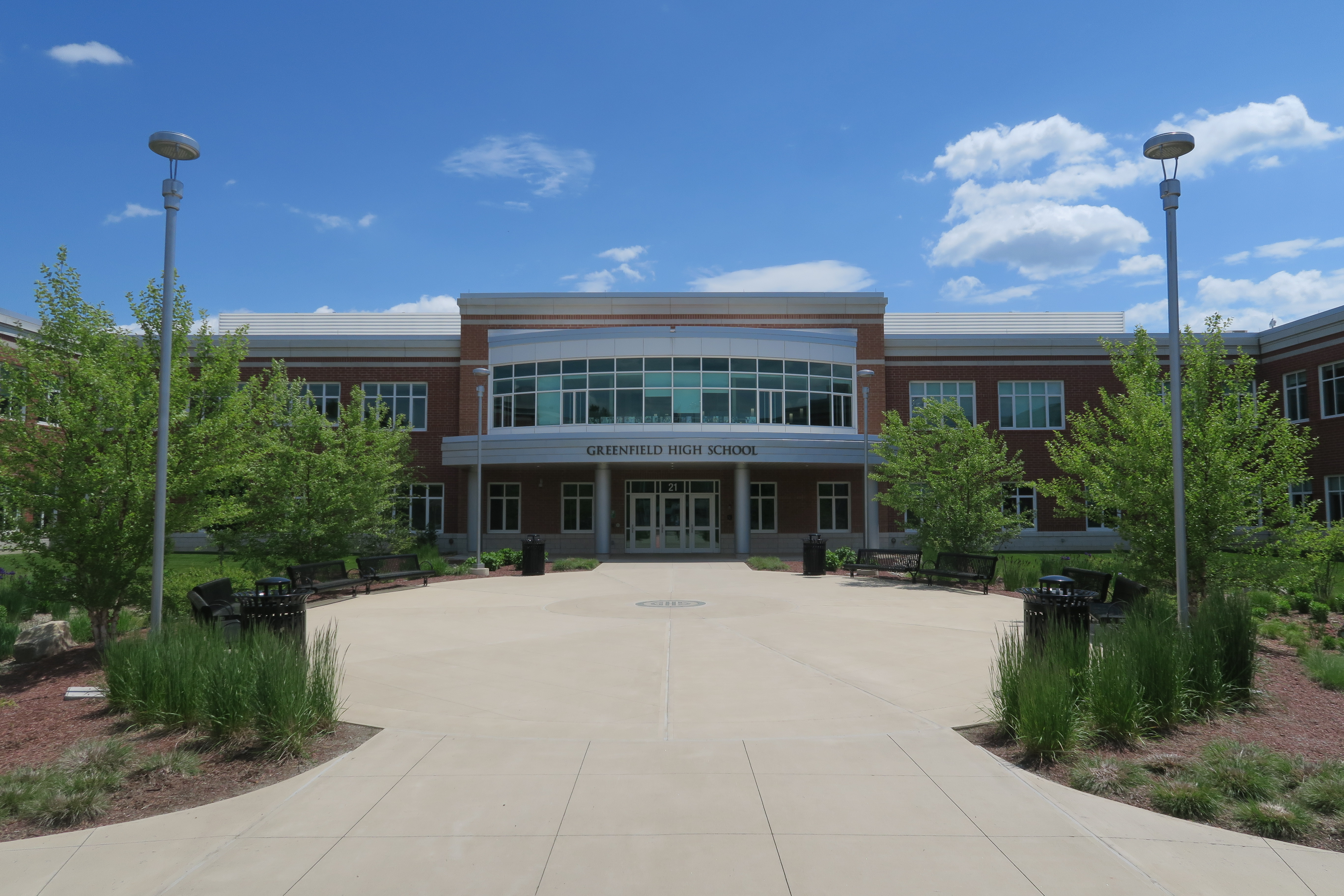
- Greenfield High School
- 21 Barr Avenue; Greenfield, MA 01301; United States

Information
- Type: Public; High school Open enrollment
- School district: Greenfield Public Schools
- Superintendent: Roland Joyal
- Principal: Michael Browning
- Teaching staff: 38.55 (FTE)
- Grades: 8-12
- Enrollment: 448 (2023-2024)
- Student to teacher ratio: 11.62
- Colors: Green and white
- Team name: Green Wave
- Website: Greenfield High School

Greenfield High School is located in Greenfield, Massachusetts, United States.

== History ==
The current school building was opened in 2015, on the site of the previous school. The building is owned by the town of Greenfield.

== Notable alumni ==
- Stan Batinski
- Penn Jillette
- Michael Moschen
- Cornelius Murphy
- Elena Pirozhkova

== Sources ==
- Thompson, F.M.G.; Kellogg, L.J.C. (1904). "Schools". History of Greenfield: Shire Town of Franklin County, Massachusetts. Press of T. Morey & Son. pp. 581–599. ISBN 978-0-7884-4930-7.
