= José Martínez-Zorilla =

Mexican gridiron football player (1912–1989)

José Martínez-Zorrilla
Cornell Big Red
- Position: End
- Class: 32

Personal information
- Born: 24 December 1912; Guadalajara, Jalisco, Mexico
- Died: 17 September 1989 (aged 76); Mexico City, Mexico

Career information
- College: Cornell (1932)

Awards and highlights
- First-team All-American (1932); First-team All-Eastern (1932)

José Claudio Martínez-Zorilla Schnaider (24 December 1912 – 17 September 1989) was a Mexican player of American football.

A native of Guadalajara, Mexico, Martínez-Zorilla was one of three brothers to attend Cornell University and play for the Cornell Big Red football team from 1930 to 1932. He was selected by the Associated Press as a first-team end on the 1932 College Football All-America Team. He was also invited to play in the East–West Shrine Game after the 1932 season.

After graduating from Cornell in 1933, Martínez-Zorilla was hired as the head athletic coach of the polytechnical schools for the National Bureau of Education in Mexico City. He also played for Centro Venustiano Carranza club in 1933 along with his brother Cristobal, facing the National Autonomous University of Mexico in a game in October. Martínez-Zorilla also played polo for Mexico's international team and competed in fencing for both Cornell and in the Olympics for Mexico. He competed in the individual épée event at the 1936 Summer Olympics. In 1942, he trained as a flying cadet in Phoenix, Arizona.
