= Elmer Schaake =

American sports player and coach (1911–1966)

Biographical details
- Born: February 7, 1911; Lawrence, Kansas, U.S.
- Died: January 24, 1966 (aged 54); Burlingame, California, U.S.

Playing career

Football
- 1930–1932: Kansas
- 1933: Portsmouth Spartans

Basketball
- 1932–1933: Kansas
- Positions: Halfback (football); Guard (basketball)

Coaching career (HC unless noted)

Football
- 1934–1937: Bethany (KS)
- 1938–1942: Lawrence HS (KS)
- 1943–1944: Kansas (assistant)
- 1946: Willamette (assistant)
- 1947: Modesto (assistant)
- 1948: Modesto

Basketball
- 1946–1947: Willamette

Baseball
- 1944: Kansas

Track
- 1946–1947: Willamette
- 1947–1948: Modesto
- 1948–1949: Modesto (assistant)

Head coaching record
- Overall: 13–19–2 (college football); 9–15 (college basketball); 0–5 (college baseball); 5–6 (junior college football)

Accomplishments and honors

Awards
- First-team All-Big Six (1932); Second-team All-Big Six (1930)

Elmer H. W. Schaake (February 7, 1911 – January 24, 1966) was an American football player and coach of football, basketball, baseball, and track. He played college football and college basketball at the University of Kansas and one season of professional football in the National Football League (NFL) with the Portsmouth Spartans. Schaake served as the head football coach at Bethany College in Lindsborg, Kansas from 1934 to 1937, compiling a record of 13–19–2. He was also the head baseball coach at his alma mater, Kansas, for one season in 1944 and the head basketball coach at Willamette University during the 1946–47 season.

== Playing career ==
=== Kansas ===
Schaake played football at the University of Kansas from 1930 to 1932 and was named unanimous All Big–Six Conference. He also played for the basketball team at Kansas.

=== Portsmouth Spartans ===
Schaake played one season of professional football in 1933 with the Portsmouth Spartans After one year of professional football, he chose to enter the coaching ranks.

== Coaching career ==
Schaake coached for 30 years. Schaake was the head football coach at Bethany College in Lindsborg, Kansas for four seasons, from 1934 to 1937, compiling a record of 13–19–2.

After Bethany, Schaake spent five years at Lawrence High School, where he compiled a 29–11–4 record and served one year as an assistant for the University of Kansas He also worked as the head baseball coach of the Jayhawks for one year.

In 1947, Schaake was hired as head track coach, assistant football coach, and physical education instructor Modesto Junior College (MJC) in Modesto, California. The following year, he was promoted to head football coach and also assisted Stan Pavko with track team. Schaake led the Modesto football team to a record of 5–6 in 1948 before resigning in the spring of 1949.

== Awards ==
In 1972, Schaake was inducted in the Kansas Sports Hall of Fame.

== Head coaching record ==
=== College football ===
Year	Team	Overall	Conference	Standing	Bowl/playoffs
Bethany Swedes (Kansas Collegiate Athletic Conference) (1934–1937)
1934	Bethany	1–8	0–5	6th	
1935	Bethany	4–4	1–4	5th	
1936	Bethany	4–2–2	3–1–1	T–2nd	
1937	Bethany	4–5	3–2	T–2nd	
Bethany:		13–19–2	7–12–1		
Total:		13–19–2			

=== Junior college football ===
Year	Team	Overall	Conference	Standing	Bowl/playoffs
Modesto Pirates (Northern California Junior College Conference) (1948)
1948	Modesto	5–6	2–5	T–5th (A Division)	
Modesto:		5–6	2–5		
Total:		5–6			
