= Bart Viviano =

American football player (1911–1990)

Profile
- Position: Fullback

Personal information
- Born: March 24, 1911; New York, U.S.
- Died: July 25, 1990 (age 79)

Career information
- College: Cornell University

Awards and highlights
- 2× Second-team All-American (1931, 1932); 3× First-team All-Eastern (1930, 1931, 1932)

Bartholomew Joseph Viviano (March 24, 1911 – July 25, 1990) was an American football player. He was born in the State of New York, raised in Plainfield, New Jersey, attended preparatory school at Andover, and then enrolled at Cornell University. While at Cornell, he played college football at the fullback position for the Cornell Big Red football team from 1930 to 1932. As a sophomore, he was selected by Tad Jones as a halfback on the All-Eastern team. As a junior and senior, he was selected by the Associated Press as a second-team fullback on the 1931 and 1932 College Football All-America Teams. He was also invited to play in the East–West Shrine Game after the 1932 season.
