= Walt Uzdavinis =

American football player (1911–1988)

No. 30, 20
- Position: End

Personal information
- Born: June 9, 1911; Middleborough, Massachusetts, U.S.
- Died: December 23, 1988 (aged 77); Glastonbury, Connecticut, U.S.
- Listed height: 6 ft 2 in (1.88 m)
- Listed weight: 210 lb (95 kg)

Career information
- High school: Brockton (Brockton, Massachusetts)
- College: Fordham (1930–1933)

Career history
- New Rochelle Bulldogs (1934); Boston Shamrocks (1936); Cleveland Rams (1937)

Awards and highlights
- First-team All-Eastern (1932)
- Stats at Pro Football Reference

Walter Alfred Uzdavinis (June 9, 1911 – December 23, 1988) was an American professional football end who played one season with the Cleveland Rams of the National Football League (NFL). He played college football at Fordham University.

== Early life and college ==
Walter Alfred Uzdavinis was born on June 9, 1911, in Middleborough, Massachusetts. He attended Brockton High School in Brockton, Massachusetts.

Uzdavinis was a member of the Fordham Rams of Fordham University from 1930 to 1933 and a three-year letterman from 1931 to 1933. He was named first-team All-Eastern by the Associated Press in 1932.

== Professional career ==
Uzdavinis played in one game, a start, for the independent New Rochelle Bulldogs in 1934.

He appeared in seven games, starting one, for the Boston Shamrocks of the American Football League in 1936 and scored one receiving touchdown.

Uzdavinis played in seven games, starting three, for the Cleveland Rams during the team's first season in the NFL in 1937. He caught one pass for 15 yards while with the Rams.

== Personal life ==
Uzdavinis died on December 23, 1988, in Glastonbury, Connecticut.
