= Joe Skladany =

American football player and coach (1911–1972)

- Skladany in 1932

Biographical details
- Born: May 25, 1911; Larksville, Pennsylvania, U.S.
- Died: August 9, 1972 (aged 61); Harrisburg, Pennsylvania, U.S.

Playing career
- 1931–1933: Pittsburgh
- 1934: Pittsburgh Pirates
- Position: End

Coaching career (HC unless noted)
- 1937–1942: Carnegie Tech (assistant)
- 1943: Carnegie Tech

Head coaching record
- Overall: 0–4–1

Accomplishments and honors

Awards
- 2× Consensus All-American (1932, 1933); 2× First-team All-Eastern (1932, 1933)
- College Football Hall of Fame; Inducted in 1975 (profile)

Joseph Peter "Muggsy" Skladany (May 25, 1911 – August 9, 1972) was an American football player and coach. He played college football at the University of Pittsburgh, where he was consensus All-American at end in 1932 and 1933. Skladany played professionally for one season, in 1934, with the Pittsburgh Pirates of the National Football League (NFL).

Skladany served as the head football coach at the Carnegie Institute of Technology—now known as Carnegie Mellon University—for one season, in 1943, compiling a record of 0–4–1.

Skladany was found dead on August 9, 1972, at the Penn Harris Hotel in Harrisburg, Pennsylvania. He was inducted into the College Football Hall of Fame as a player in 1975.

== Head coaching record ==
Year	Team	Overall	Conference	Standing	Bowl/playoffs
Carnegie Tech Tartans (Independent) (1943)
1943	Carnegie Tech	0–4–1			
Carnegie Tech:		0–4–1			
Total:		0–4–1			
