= Lawrence Ely =

American football player (1911–1983)

Profile
- Position: Center

Personal information
- Born: July 4, 1911; Wisconsin
- Died: November 3, 1983 (aged 72); Anchorage, Alaska, U.S.

Career information
- College: University of Nebraska

Awards and highlights
- First-team All-American (1932); First-team All-Big Six (1932); 2× Second-team All-Big Six (1930, 1931)

Lawrence S. Ely (July 4, 1911 – November 3, 1983) was an American football player. He was born in Wisconsin and raised in Nelson and Grand Island, Nebraska. He played college football at the center position for the Nebraska Cornhuskers football team and was selected by the Associated Press, Collier's Weekly (chosen by Grantland Rice), and the All-America Board, as a first-team player on the 1932 College Football All-America Team. He was inducted into the Nebraska Football Hall of Fame in 1974.
