= William Davis Ticknor Sr. =

American businessman (1881–1938)

William Davis Ticknor Sr. (January 11, 1881 – March 24, 1938) was president and chairman of the board of Commercial Solvents Corporation. He was also president of Commercial Pigments Corporation.

== Biography ==
He was born on January 11, 1881, in Massachusetts, United States. On August 3, 1906, he married Ella Frances Wattles (1880–1963) in Canton, Massachusetts. They had two children, William Davis Ticknor Jr. (1907–1965) and Benjamin Holt Ticknor (1909–1979). He died on March 24, 1938, in Englewood, New Jersey. He was buried in Mount Auburn Cemetery.

== Legacy ==
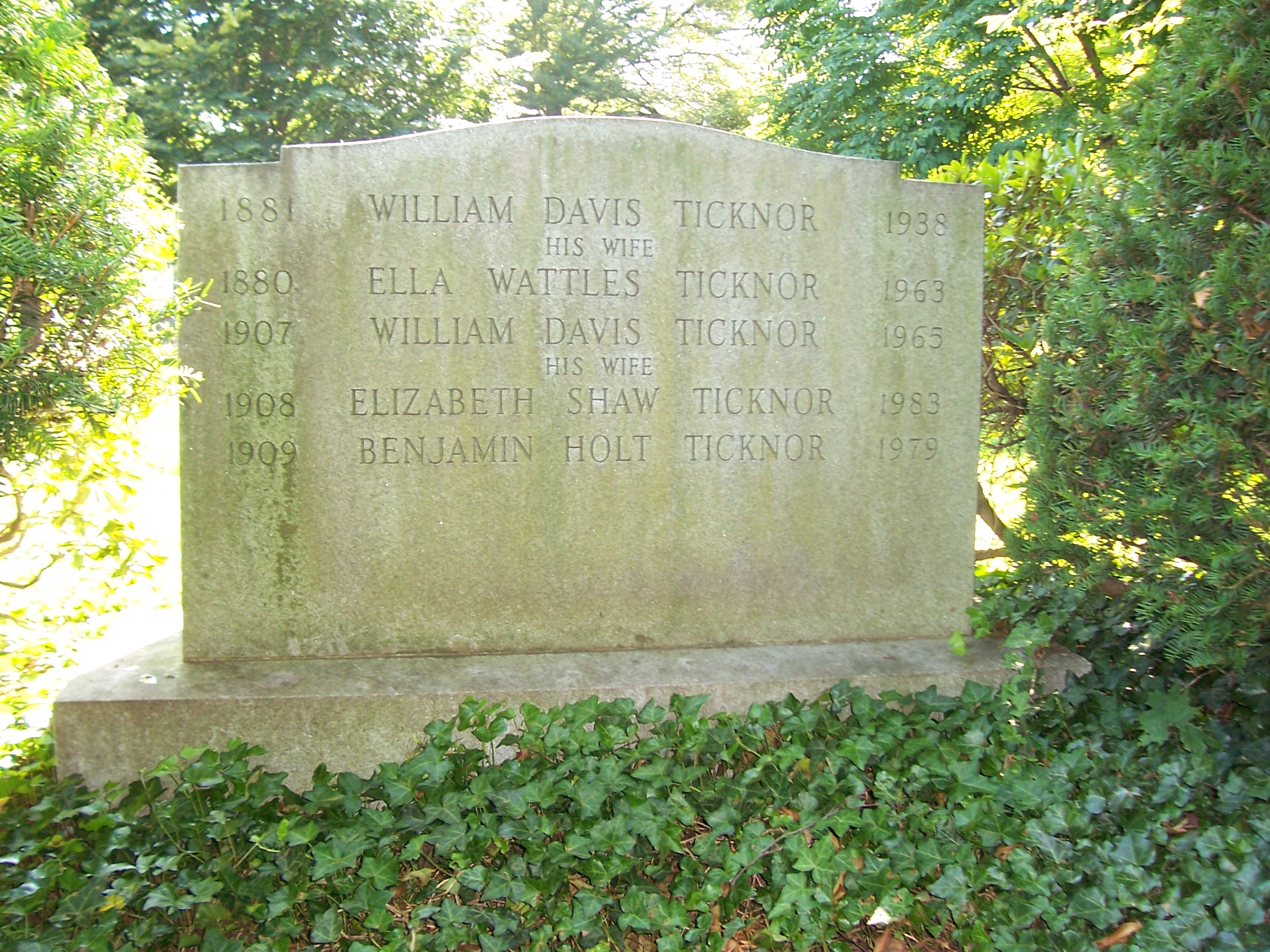
Grave of William Davis Ticknor at Mount Auburn Cemetery in Cambridge, Massachusetts

In 1946, his son, William Davis Ticknor Jr., was appointed manager of the export division of Commercial Solvents Corporation.
