= Commercial Solvents Corporation =

American chemical and biotechnology company

- Industry: Chemicals
- Founded: 1919
- Headquarters: Midtown Manhattan, New York City, United States
- Key people: Dr. Chaim Weizmann, William Davis Ticknor Sr.
- Products: Alcohol solvents

Commercial Solvents Corporation (CSC) was an American chemical and biotechnology company created in 1919.

== History ==
The Commercial Solvents Corporation was established at the end of World War I; earning distinction as the pioneer producer of acetone and butanol by fermentation processes developed and patented by Dr. Chaim Weizmann. Terre Haute, Indiana was chosen to be the site of CSC's research as this location made possible the expedient translation of new processes from the laboratory and demonstration plant into full production.

As early as 1917, the corporation began work in Terre Haute, Indiana. It developed the conversion of corn and other grains into ethanol by fermentation. They later produced riboflavin by microbial action.

== Presidents ==
- Philip G. Mumford 1922 to 1928.
- William Davis Ticknor Sr. 1920 to 1922 and 1928 to 1938, was president and chairman of the board.
- Theodore P. Walker 1938 to 1947.
- Henry E. Perry 1947 to 1950.
- J. Albert Woods 1950 to 1959.
- Maynard C Wheeler 1959 to 1966.
- Robert C. Wheeler 1966 to 1973.
- William S. Leonhardt 1973 to 1975.
