= Paul Riblett =

American football player and coach (1908–1976)

- Riblett in 1935

Profile
- Position: End

Personal information
- Born: May 23, 1908; Youngwood, Pennsylvania, U.S.
- Died: March 1, 1976 (aged 67); Cherry Hill, New Jersey, U.S.

Career information
- High school: The Kiski School
- College: University of Pennsylvania

Career history
- 1932–1936: Brooklyn Dodgers

Awards and highlights
- First-team All-Eastern (1931)

Paul Gerald Riblett (May 23, 1908 – March 1, 1976) was an American football player and coach. He played professionally as an end for five seasons in the National Football League (NFL) with the Brooklyn Dodgers. Riblett attended the University of Pennsylvania, where he starred in football, basketball, and lacrosse. He was the captain of the 1931 Penn Quakers football team. Riblett worked as an ends coach at the City College of New York (CCNY) under Benny Friedman before returning to his alma mater in 1938 as an assistant football coach under George Munger.
