= Mike Steponovich =

American football player (1908–1974)

Profile
- Position: Guard

Personal information
- Born: December 5, 1908; Lead, South Dakota, U.S.
- Died: May 1974 (age 65)

Career information
- College: St. Mary's (Cal.)

Career history
- 1933: Boston Redskins

Awards and highlights
- Third-team All-American (1932)
- Stats at Pro Football Reference

Michael M. Steponovich (December 5, 1908 – May 1974) was an American football guard in the National Football League (NFL) for the Boston Redskins. He attended Saint Mary's College of California. He was selected as a third-team guard on the 1932 College Football All-America Team.
