= Doug Russell (American football) =

American football player (1911–1995)

Profile
- Positions: Fullback, halfback, quarterback

Personal information
- Born: June 11, 1911; Bulger, Pennsylvania, U.S.
- Died: October 10, 1995 (aged 84); Lebanon, Missouri, U.S.

Career information
- College: Kansas State

Career history
- 1934–1939: Chicago Cardinals
- 1939: Cleveland Rams

Awards and highlights
- NFL rushing yards leader (1935); First-team All-Big Six (1933); Second-team All-Big Six (1932)

Dougal Russell Jr. (June 11, 1911 – October 10, 1995) was an American professional football player. In the 1935 NFL season, Russell led the league in rushing yards with 499. On November 27, 1938, during a game against the Cleveland Rams, Russell threw a 98-yard touchdown pass to Gaynell Tinsley.
