= Red Matal =

American football player and coach (1911–2003)

Biographical details
- Born: July 18, 1911; Lawrence, Massachusetts
- Died: March 18, 2003 (aged 91)

Playing career
- 1932–1933: Columbia
- Position: End

Coaching career (HC unless noted)
- 1935–1939: Columbia (ends)
- 1939–1943: Taunton HS (NJ)
- 1946: Taunton HS (NJ)
- 1947–1955: Columbia (ends)
- 1955–?: Northern Valley Reg. HS (NJ)

Accomplishments and honors

Awards
- First-team All-American (1933); Second-team All-American (1932)

Anthony R. "Red" Matal Jr. (July 18, 1911 – March 18, 2003), sometimes known as Tony Matal, was an American football player and coach. He was an All-American end at Columbia University in 1933. He later coached football at Columbia and at high schools in Taunton, Massachusetts, and Bergen County, New Jersey.

== Athletic career ==
A native of Lawrence, Massachusetts, Matal attended the Roxbury School in Cheshire, Connecticut. At Roxbury, Matal played football, basketball and baseball. In the fall of 1931, he enrolled at Columbia University where he played college football, baseball and basketball. As a junior, Matal was selected by the United Press as a second-team end on the 1932 College Football All-America Team. The following year, he was selected by both the Football Writers Association of America and Davis J. Walsh, sports editor of International News Service as a first-team end on the 1933 College Football All-America Team. In the 1934 Rose Bowl game, Matal caught a pass from midfield at the 19-yard line to set up "the famous KF-79 touchdown play" as Columbia upset Stanford by a score of 7 to 0.

== Coaching career ==
Matal remained at Columbia as a graduate student, ultimately receiving a master's degree in physical education, and he also served from 1935 to 1939 as the varsity ends coach for the Columbia Lions football team. From 1939 to 1943, he was employed at Taunton High School as the athletic director and head coach of the football, basketball and baseball teams. Matal entered the United States Army in 1943 and served two-and-a-half years, including a stint as a special agent for the War Department in Germany. After being discharged from the Army, he returned to Taunton High School in the spring of 1946 and remained there for one year. In March 1947, Matal returned to Columbia as the Lions' ends coach. He remained with the Columbia Lions through the 1954 season. In April 1955, Matal was hired as the head football coach and athletic director at Northern Valley Regional High School at Demarest in Bergen County, New Jersey.

Matal taught and coached football at Babylon HS in Babylon, NY in the 1960s. (ref-BHS yearbooks for the period)
