= John Orsi =

American football player and coach (1908–1978)

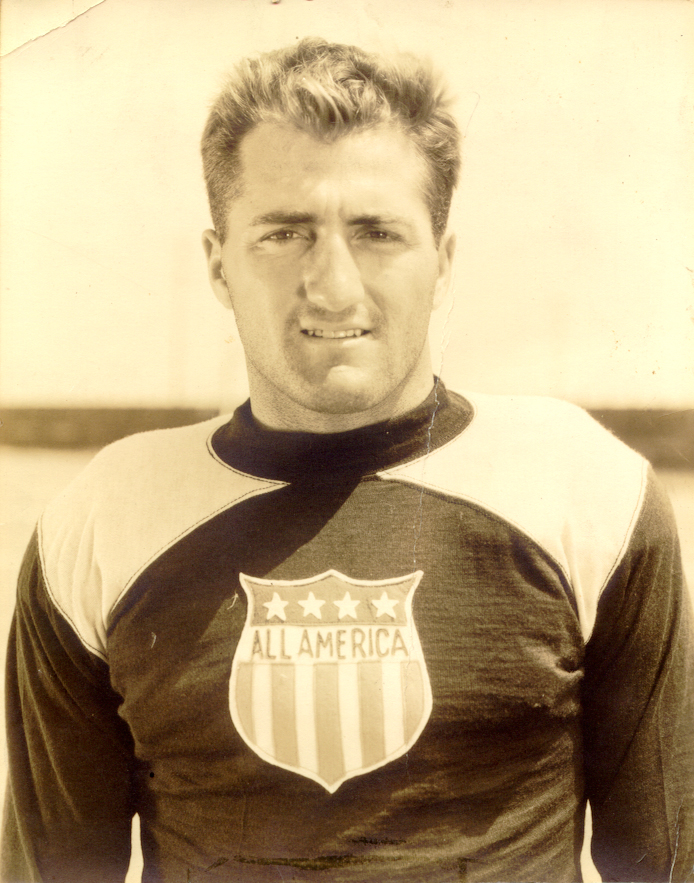
- Orsi wearing 1931 All America jersey

Biographical details
- Born: November 11, 1908; Newark, New Jersey, U.S.
- Died: February 7, 1978 (aged 69); Naples, Florida, U.S.

Playing career

Football
- 1929–1931: Colgate

Basketball
- 1930–1931: Colgate

Track
- c. 1930: Colgate
- Position: End (football)

Coaching career (HC unless noted)

Football
- 1932–1941: Colgate (ends)
- 1942: William Penn Charter (PA) (assistant)
- 1943: William Penn Charter (PA)
- 1944–1945: Germantown Academy (PA) (assistant)
- 1946–1956: Episcopal Academy (PA)

Accomplishments and honors

Awards
- First-team All-American (1931); First-team All-Eastern (1931)
- College Football Hall of Fame; Inducted in 1982 (profile)

John Francis "Count" Orsi (November 11, 1908 – February 7, 1978) was an American football player and coach. He played college football at Colgate University and an end. He was inducted into the College Football Hall of Fame in 1982.

== Early years ==
Orsi was born on November 11, 1908, in Newark, New Jersey to Italian immigrant parents. The youngest of seven children, he grew up in Newark and attended Columbia High School in Maplewood, New Jersey. In 1926, the Columbia High football team, with Orsi, made it to the state finals but lost 7–0. Orsi moved on to The Perkiomen School from 1927 to 1928. On his birthday in 1967, he was honored at Perkiomen with 'John Orsi Day' to mark his athletic exploits. He also served as the chairman of the Annual Gift Fund at Perkiomen for that school year.

== Colgate ==
Orsi moved on to Colgate University, where he was a three-sport star. He played basketball and ran track, but starred in football for the head coach Andrew Kerr. With Orsi at end, Colgate went 25–3 from 1929 to 1931. He made headlines in 1930 in a postseason charity game against NYU at Yankee Stadium. With Colgate leading 7–0, NYU scored a late touchdown to bring the score to 7–6, but Orsi blocked the ensuing extra point attempt to seal the victory. Lloyd Jordan, an assistant coach with Colgate at the time, later recalled that block as one of the best memories of his coaching career. The block in 1930 set the stage for Orsi's All-American year in 1931. Colgate had a great year with Orsi as a senior captain, only losing to NYU in Yankee Stadium. Orsi had perhaps his best game against rival Syracuse at Archbold Stadium. Colgate won the game 21–7 with Orsi scoring one touchdown and paving the way with blocks on the other two. After the season, Orsi was selected to the All-America team and was invited to Hollywood for the filming of 'The All-American' (1932).

== Coaching ==
Orsi did not go far after graduating as he joined Kerr's coaching staff at Colgate. He was the end coach beginning in 1932 with the famous undefeated, untied, unscored upon, and uninvited team. He held the position as end coach until resigning in 1941. He moved on to the William Penn Charter School as an assistant coach in 1942 and assumed the head coaching position for the 1943 season. From 1944 to 1945, he was an assistant coach at Germantown Academy and from 1946 to 1956 he was the head coach at Episcopal Academy. He later became vice president of the Maxwell Football Club and was on hand at their award ceremonies, including 1968 when O. J. Simpson won the Maxwell Award.

== Personal life ==
Orsi married Elizabeth Claire Shea in 1936 and they had three children. Elizabeth died from leukemia, and Orsi remarried to Katherine White in 1953. Orsi lived in Gladwyne, Pennsylvania for much of his later life and died in 1978, in Naples, Florida.
