= George Chalmers (American football) =

American football player (1908–1988)

Profile
- Position: Center

Personal information
- Born: October 19, 1908; Massachusetts
- Died: August 7, 1988 (aged 79); Los Angeles
- Listed height: 6 ft 0 in (1.83 m)
- Listed weight: 196 lb (89 kg)

Career information
- College: NYU

Career history
- Brooklyn Dodgers (1933)

George B. Chalmers (October 19, 1908 – August 7, 1988), sometimes referred to as George Palmer, was an American football player.

Chalmers was born in 1908 in Massachusetts and attended Medford High School. He played college football at NYU from 1928 to 1931, earning varsity letters in 1929, 1930, and 1931. He played at the guard, center and end positions for NYU. At the end of the 1931 season, he was selected as the second-team center on the New York All-Metropolitan team.

Chalmers then played professional football in 1932 for the New Rochelle Bulldogs or the Eastern Football League, in 1933 for the Brooklyn Dodgers of the National Football League (NFL), and in 1936 for the Paterson Panthers. He appeared in seven NFL games with the Dodgers, recording one interception and one touchdown.

Chalmers died in 1988 in Los Angeles.
