= Tom Gilbane =

American football player and coach (1911–1981)

Biographical details
- Born: November 4, 1911
- Died: November 7, 1981 (aged 70); Providence, Rhode Island, U.S.

Playing career
- 1931–1932: Brown
- Position: Center

Coaching career (HC unless noted)
- 1934–1935: Westminster (PA)

Head coaching record
- Overall: 5–11–1

Accomplishments and honors

Awards
- All-American (1932)

Thomas Freeman Gilbane (November 4, 1911 – November 7, 1981) was an American college football player and coach. He played football at Brown University in Providence, Rhode Island, where he earned honorable mention 1932 All-American honors as a center. Gilbane served as the head football coach at Westminster College in New Wilmington, Pennsylvania from 1934 to 1935, compiling a record of 5–11–1. Gilbane was later the chief executive officer of Gilbane Building Co., one of the largest construction companies in the United States. He died on November 7, 1981, at Rhode Island Hospital in Providence, Rhode Island.

== Head coaching record ==
Year	Team	Overall	Conference	Standing	Bowl/playoffs
Westminster Titans (Independent) (1934–1935)
1934	Westminster	3–6–1			
1935	Westminster	2–5			
Westminster:		5–11–1			
Total:		5–11–1			
