= Milton Summerfelt =

United States Air Force general

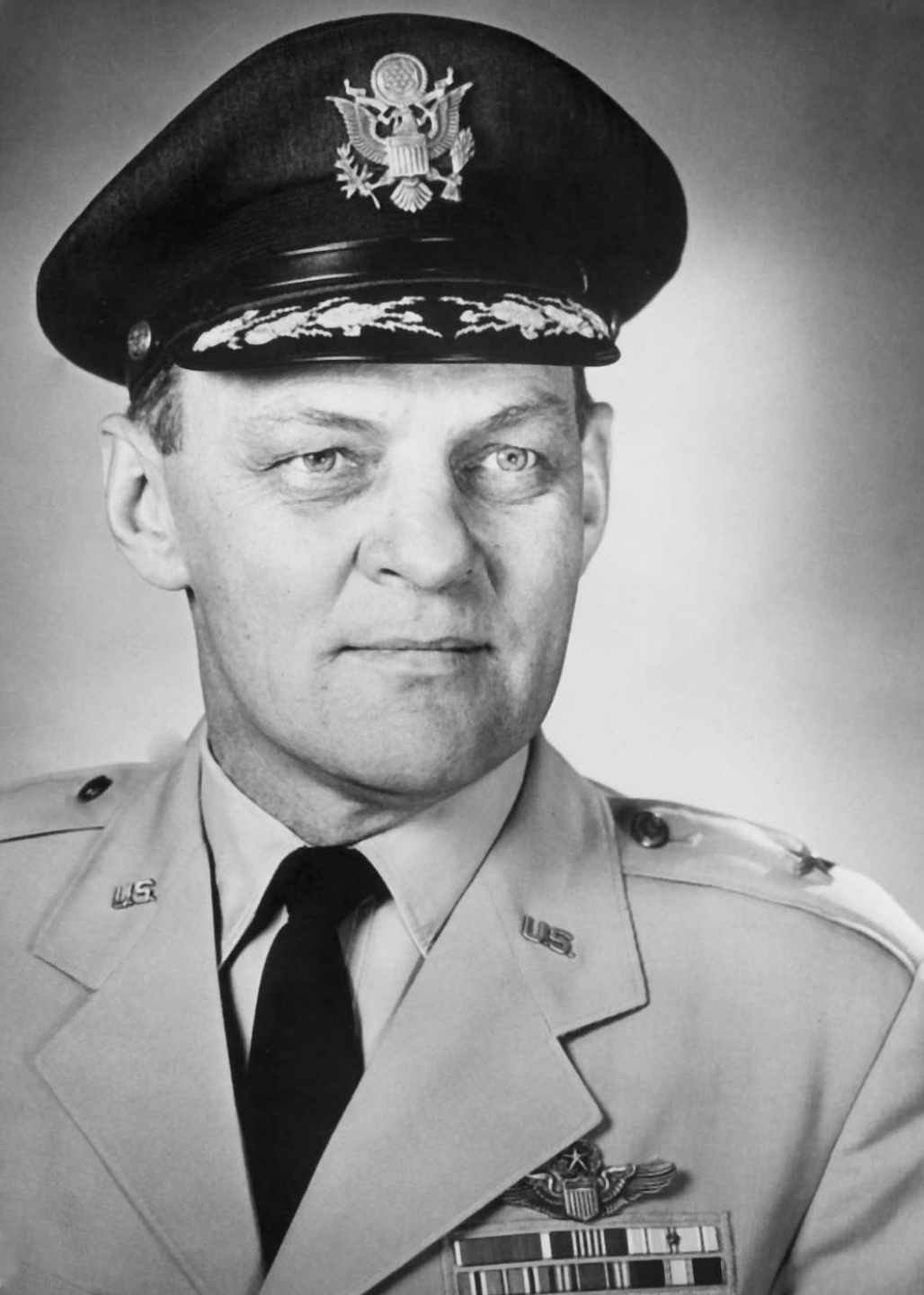
- Brigadier General Milton F Summerfelt

Army Black Knights
- Position: Guard

Personal information
- Born: June 16, 1908; Benton Harbor, Michigan, U.S.
- Died: October 15, 1984 (aged 76)

Career information
- College: Army (1932)

Awards and highlights
- Consensus All-American (1932); First-team All-Eastern (1932)

Milton Frederick Summerfelt (June 16, 1908 – October 15, 1984) was an American football player and a Brigadier General in the United States Air Force. He played for the Army Black Knights football team and was selected as a consensus first-team guard on the 1932 College Football All-America Team.

== Early life ==
Summerfelt was born in Benton Harbor, Michigan, in 1908. He began his education at Western Michigan State College and Northwestern University, befort being accepted into the United States Military Academy at West Point, New York.

== West Point ==
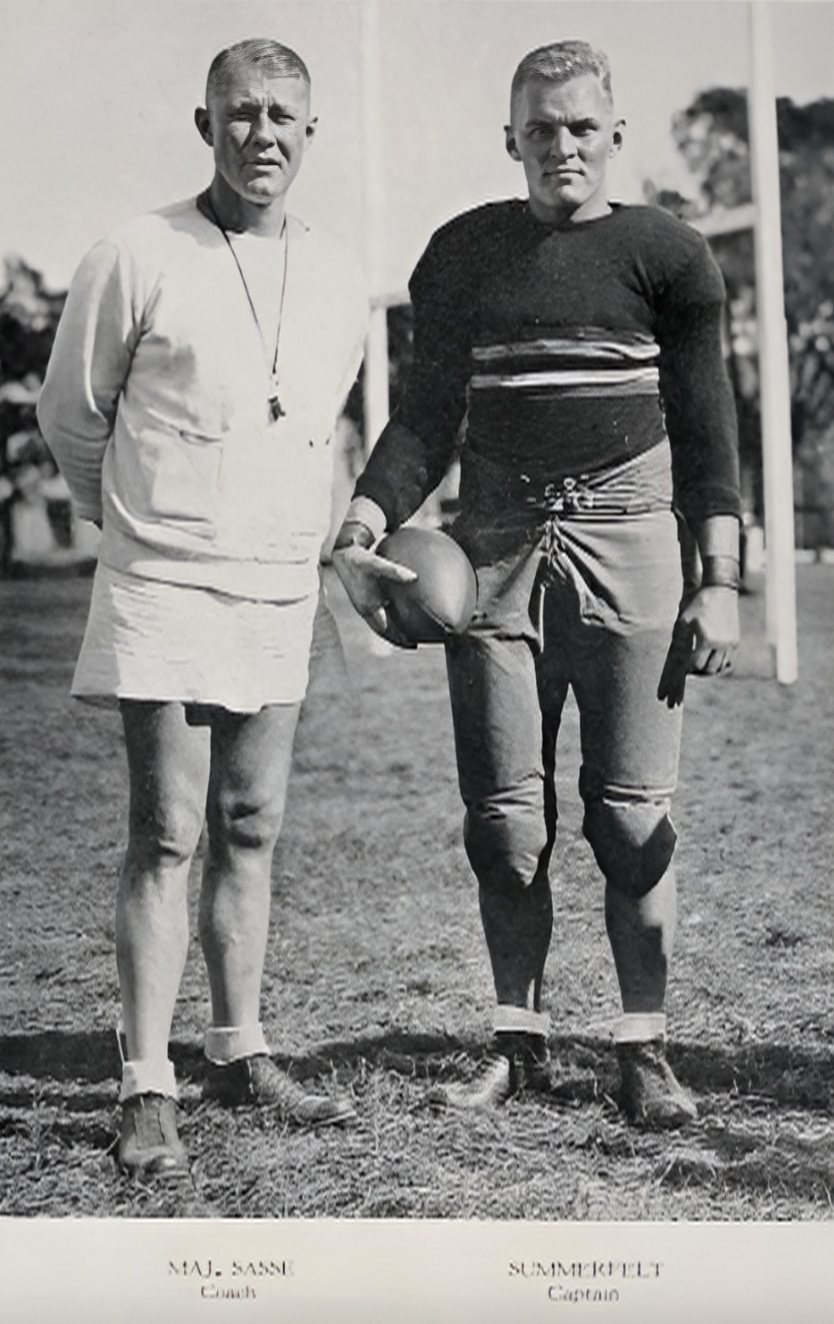
Milton Summerfelt Captain of the Army Black Knights football team

While at the Academy, he played at the guard position for the Army Black Knights football team and was a consensus selection for the 1932 College Football All-America Team. He graduated from USMA class of 1933.He was the Cadet Captain for "M" Company.

== Military career ==
After graduating from West Point, Summerfelt undertook flight training and served at Luke Field in Hawaii, Mitchel Field on Long Island, and the Aberdeen Proving Ground in Maryland. With the United States entry into World War II, he was assigned to Army Air Force headquarters in Washington, D.C., where he was assigned to bombardment operations. In 1944, he was assigned to temporary duty in the China Burma India Theater. He assumed command of the 333d Bomb Group, a B-29 Superfortress bomber group stationed on Okinawa, in 1945.

After the war, he participated in senior officer training at Fort Leavenworth in Kansas and then returned to Okinawa as the operations officer of the 316th Bomb Wing. He was promoted to the rank of general and, in October 1946, he was assigned to the Operations Division, War Department General Staff Policy Branch, in Washington. From September 1947 to August 1949, he served as deputy chief of staff for operations for the Atomic Energy Office. After further training at the National War College, he was assigned to the Office of the Joint Chiefs of Staff, Joint Strategic Plans Group.

In June 1952, he became the commanding officer at the Rome Air Force Depot in Utica, New York. In January 1955, he became deputy chief of the Advance Planning Group, U.S. European Command, in Bonn, Germany. He became the deputy chief of the Military Assistance Advisory Group in Germany in 1956. In 1958, he returned to the United States as deputy commander of the Sacramento Air Materiel Area.
