= 1932 All-America college football team =

Official list of the best college football players of 1932

The 1932 All-America college football team is composed of college football players who were selected as All-Americans by various organizations and writers that chose All-America college football teams in 1932. The eight selectors recognized by the NCAA as "official" for the 1932 season are (1) Collier's Weekly, as selected by Grantland Rice, (2) the Associated Press, (3) the United Press, (4) the All-America Board, (5) the Football Writers Association of America (FWAA); (6) the International News Service (INS), (7) Liberty magazine, and (8) the Newspaper Enterprise Association (NEA).

== Consensus All-Americans ==
For the year 1932, the NCAA recognizes eight published All-American teams as "official" designations for purposes of its consensus determinations. The following chart identifies the NCAA-recognized consensus All-Americans and displays which first-team designations they received.

| Name | Position | School | Number | Official | Other |
|---|---|---|---|---|---|
| Paul Moss | End | Purdue | 8/8 | AAB, AP, CO, FWAA, INS, LIB, NEA, UP | CP, NYS, NYT, PD, PM, TR, WC |
| Harry Newman | Quarterback | Michigan | 8/8 | AAB, AP, CO, FWAA, INS, LIB, NEA, UP | CP, NYS, NYT, PD, PM, TR, WC |
| Joe Kurth | Tackle | Notre Dame | 8/8 | AAB, AP, CO, FWAA, INS, LIB, NEA, UP | CP, NYS, NYT, PM, TR, WC |
| Ernie Smith | Tackle | USC | 8/8 | AAB, AP, CO, FWAA, INS, LIB, NEA, UP | CP, NYS, NYT, TR, WC |
| Warren Heller | Halfback | Pittsburgh | 8/8 | AAB, AP, CO, FWAA, INS, LIB, NEA, UP | CP, NYS, PM, TR |
| Milton Summerfelt | Guard | Army | 6/8 | AP, CO, FWAA, INS, NEA, UP | CP, NYS, NYT, TR, PD, PM |
| Jimmy Hitchcock | Halfback | Auburn | 6/8 | AAB, AP, CO, FWAA, INS, NEA | NYT, WC, TR, PD, PM |
| Bill Corbus | Guard | Stanford | 4/8 | AAB, CO, NEA, UP | NYS, TR, WC |
| Don Zimmerman | Halfback | Tulane | 4/8 | AP, CO, LIB, UP | CP, NYT |
| Joe Skladany | End | Pittsburgh | 4/8 | FWAA, INS, NEA, UP | TR |
| Lawrence Ely | Center | Nebraska | 3/8 | AAB, AP, CO | NYS |
| Clarence Gracey | Center | Vanderbilt | 2/8 | LIB, UP | NYT, PD, TR |

== All-American selections for 1932 ==
=== Ends ===
- Paul Moss, Purdue (AP-1; UP-1; CO-1; AAB-1; NEA-1; INS-1; CP-1; NYS-1; NYT-1; WC-1; FWAA; LIB; TR-1; PD; PM)
- Joe Skladany, Pittsburgh (College Football Hall of Fame) (AP-2; UP-1; NEA-1; INS-1; CP-2; FWAA; TR-1)
- Ted Petoskey, Michigan (UP-3; WC-1; AAB-1; INS-3; NYS-2)
- Jose Martinez-Zorilla, Cornell (AP-1)
- David Ariail, Auburn (NEA-2; CP-1)
- Richard T. King, Army (AP-2; UP-3; NEA-2; INS-2; NYS-1)
- Dave Nisbet, Washington (AP-3; CO-1; INS-2; LIB)
- Clary Anderson, Colgate (NEA-3; NYT-1)
- Frank Meadow, Brown (AP-3)
- Edwin Kosky, Notre Dame (UP-2)
- Virgil Rayburn, Tennessee (NYS-2)
- Red Matal, Columbia (UP-2; NEA-3; PM)
- Francis "Hands" Slavich, Santa Clara (INS-3)
- Sid Gillman, Ohio State (PD)
- Ivy Williamson, Michigan (CP-2)
- Ford Palmer, USC (CP-3)
- Madison Pruitt, TCU (CP-3)

=== Tackles ===
- Joe Kurth, Notre Dame (AP-1; UP-1; CO-1; AAB-1; NEA-1; INS-1; CP-1; NYS-1; NYT-1; WC-1; FWAA; LIB; TR-1; PM)
- Ernie Smith, USC (College Football Hall of Fame) (AP-1; UP-1; CO-1; AAB-1; NEA-1; INS-1; CP-1; NYS-2; NYT-1; WC-1; FWAA; LIB; TR-1; PD)
- Edward Krause, Notre Dame (AP-2; UP-3; NEA-2; INS-2; CP-2)
- Fred Crawford, Duke (College Football Hall of Fame) (AP-2; UP-2; CP-3)
- Raymond Brown, USC (AP-3; UP-3; NEA-2; INS-2; CP-3; NYS-1; PM)
- Howard Colehower, Penn (AP-3; UP-2; NEA-3; INS-3; CP-2)
- L. Brown, Brown (NEA-3)
- Ted Rosequist, Ohio State (INS-3)
- John Wilbur, Yale (NYS-2)
- Irad Hardy, Harvard (PD)

=== Guards ===
- Milton Summerfelt, Army (AP-1; UP-1; CO-1; NEA-1; INS-1; CP-1; NYS-1; FWAA; NYT-1; TR-1; PD; PM)
- Bill Corbus, Stanford (College Football Hall of Fame) (AP-3; UP-1; CO-1; AAB-1; NEA-1; CP-2; NYS-1; WC-1; TR-1)
- Robert Smith, Colgate (AP-2; UP-2; AAB-1; NEA-2; INS-1; CP-1; NYS-2; WC-1; LIB; PD)
- Aaron Rosenberg, USC (College Football Hall of Fame) (UP-3; INS-2; FWAA; LIB)
- Johnny Vaught, TCU (College Football Hall of Fame) (AP-1; UP-2; INS-3; CP-3; NYT-1)
- Joseph Gailus, Ohio State (AP-2; UP-3; NEA-2; INS-2; CP-3; NYS-2; PM)
- Mike Steponovich, St. Mary's (AP-3; NEA-3)
- James Harris, Notre Dame (NEA-3)
- Greg Kabat, Wisconsin (INS-3)
- Thomas Hupke, Alabama (CP-2)

=== Centers ===
- Clarence Gracey, Vanderbilt (AP-2; UP-1; NEA-2; INS-2; NYS-2; NYT-1; TR-1, CP-3; LIB; PD)
- Lawrence Ely, Nebraska (AP-1; UP-2; CO-1; INS-3; NYS-1)
- Chuck Bernard, Michigan (AP-3; NEA-1; INS-1; CP-2; FWAA)
- Cap Oehler, Purdue (NEA-3)
- Tom Gilbane, Brown (CP-1)
- Art Krueger, Marquette (WC-1; PM; AAB-1)
- Joe Tormey, Pitt (UP-3)

=== Quarterbacks ===
- Harry Newman, Michigan (College Football Hall of Fame) (AP-1; UP-1; CO-1; AAB-1; NEA-1; INS-1; CP-1; NYS-1; NYT-1; WC-1; FWAA; LIB; TR-1; PD; PM)
- Cliff Montgomery, Columbia (AP-2; UP-3; INS-2; NYS-2)
- Felix Vidal, Army (AP-3)
- Bob Monnett, Michigan State (NEA-2)
- Robert Ramsay Chase, Brown (INS-3; CP-2; NYS-1 [fb])
- Charles R. Soleau, Colgate (UP-2)
- William "Bill" Beasley, St. Mary's (CP-3)

=== Halfbacks ===
- Warren Heller, Pittsburgh (AP-1; UP-1; CO-1 [fb]; AAB-1; NEA-1; INS-1; CP-1; NYS-1; WC-1; FWAA; LIB; TR-1; PM)
- Jimmy Hitchcock, Auburn (College Football Hall of Fame) (AP-1; UP-2; CO-1; AAB-1; NEA-1; INS-1; CP-2; NYS-2; NYT-1; WC-1; FWAA; TR-1; PD; PM)
- Don Zimmerman, Tulane (AP-1 [fb]; UP-1; CO-1; NEA-3; INS-2; CP-1; LIB; NYT-1)
- Harrison Stafford, Texas (College Football Hall of Fame) (AP-2)
- George Sanders, Washington State (AP-2; UP-3; NEA-2; NYS-2)
- Beattie Feathers, Tennessee (College Football Hall of Fame) (AP-3; UP-3; INS-3)
- John Crickard, Harvard (AP-3)
- Gil Berry, Illinois (NEA-2; CP-3)
- Johnny Cain, Alabama (College Football Hall of Fame) (INS-2; NEA-3)
- Whitey Ask, Colgate (INS-3)
- Robert Lassiter, Yale (PD)
- Bohn Hilliard, Texas (CP-2)
- Henry "Hank" Schaldach, California (CP-3)

=== Fullbacks ===
- Roy Horstmann, Purdue (UP-2; AAB-1; NEA-1; INS-1; CP-2; NYS-1 [hb]; NYT-1; WC-1; TR-1; PM)
- Frank Christensen, Utah (UP-1; NEA-3; CP-3)
- George Melinkovich, Notre Dame (UP-2 [halfback]; NEA-2; INS-2; LIB; PD)
- Jack Manders, Minnesota (CP-1; INS-3)
- Bart Viviano, Cornell (AP-2; NYS-2)
- Duane Purvis, Purdue (AP-3)
- Angelo Brovelli, St. Mary's (UP-3; NEA-3; FWAA)

== Key ==
- **Bold** – Consensus All-American
- -1 – First-team selection
- -2 – Second-team selection
- -3 – Third-team selection

=== Official selectors ===
- AAB = All America Board selected by Christy Walsh in collaboration with Glenn Warner, W.A. Alexander, Jesse C. Harper, Edward L. Casey
- AP = Associated Press
- CO = Collier's Weekly, selected by Grantland Rice
- INS = INS (Hearst) newspaper syndicate
- LIB = Liberty magazine
- NANA = North American Newspaper Alliance
- NEA = NEA Sports Syndicate
- UP = United Press

=== Other selectors ===
- CP = Central Press Association, the captains' poll
- NYS = New York Sun
- WC = Walter Camp Football Foundation
- FWAA = Football Writers Association of America
- NYW = New York World-Telegram
- TR = Ted A. Ramsay, an attempt to create a consensus All-American team using the selections of the six most prominent selectors: the All-America Board, NEA, UP, AP, New York Sun and New York World. Three players, Moss, Kurth and Newman were unanimously selected by all six.
- PD = Parke H. Davis
- PM = Philip Martin

== See also ==
- 1932 All-Big Six Conference football team
- 1932 All-Big Ten Conference football team
- 1932 All-Pacific Coast Conference football team
- 1930 All-Southern football team
- 1932 All-Southwest Conference football team
