= Frank Walton (footballer) =

English footballer

Personal information
- Full name: Frank Hillard Walton
- Date of birth: 9 April 1918
- Place of birth: Southend-on-Sea, England
- Date of death: 2 December 1986 (aged 68)
- Place of death: Southend-on-Sea, England
- Position: Left back

Youth career
- 1934–1937: Southend United

Senior career*
Years	Team	Apps	(Gls)
- Chelmsford
1937–1951	Southend United	144	(0)
- Dartford
- * Club domestic league appearances and goals

Frank Hillard Walton (9 April 1918 – 2 December 1986) was an English footballer who played as a left back.

== Career ==
Walton began his professional career at Southend United, for whom he played for at youth level, following a short stint with Chelmsford. Walton made 144 appearances in the Football League for Southend, without scoring, before moving onto Dartford in 1951. Walton later played in the Southend Borough Combination.

Following his playing career, Walton became chairman of Southend United in 1978. The South Stand at Southend's Roots Hall ground is named after Walton.
