= Jim Zyntell =

American football player (1910–1992)

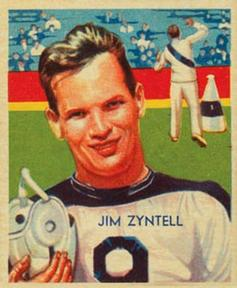

Profile
- Position: Guard

Personal information
- Born: April 27, 1910; Boston, Massachusetts, U.S.
- Died: November 13, 1992 (aged 82); Boston, Massachusetts, U.S.
- Listed height: 6 ft 1 in (1.85 m)
- Listed weight: 200 lb (91 kg)

Career information
- College: Holy Cross

Career history
- 1933: New York Giants
- 1933–1935: Philadelphia Eagles
- 1936: Boston Shamrocks

Awards and highlights
- First-team All-Eastern (1931)

Ignatius James Zyntell (April 27, 1910 – November 13, 1992) was an American football offensive lineman in the National Football League (NFL) for the New York Giants and the Philadelphia Eagles. He graduated from Boston College High School. He attended the College of the Holy Cross. He also played in 1936-37 for the Boston Shamrocks Boston Shamrocks of the American Football League. Zyntell also has the distinction of being the last person, alphabetically, in the all-time NFL players' register.
