= Ben Ticknor =

American football player (1909–1979)

- Ticknor, 1930 Harvard official team photograph

No. 55
- Position: Center
- Class: 1931

Personal information
- Born: January 8, 1909; Canton, Massachusetts, U.S.
- Died: February 12, 1979 (aged 70); Peterborough, New Hampshire, U.S.
- Listed height: 6 ft 2 in (1.88 m)
- Listed weight: 193 lb (88 kg)

Career information
- High school: Milton Academy (Milton, Massachusetts)
- College: Harvard (1928–1930)

Awards and highlights
- Unanimous All-American (1930); Consensus All-American (1929); 2× First-team All-Eastern (1929, 1930)
- College Football Hall of Fame (Class of 1954)

Benjamin Holt Ticknor II (January 9, 1909 – February 12, 1979) was an American college football player. He was a prominent center for the Harvard Crimson, also known for his play on defense.

Ticknor was the son of William Davis Ticknor Sr. and Ella Frances Wattles. His grandfather was another Benjamin Holt Ticknor and his great-grandfather another William Davis Ticknor of Ticknor and Fields.

Ticknor was captain of the 1930 team. He is remembered as one of Harvard's greatest athletes: two-time All-American footballer and Harvard's only member of the National Football Hall of Fame since the First World War. He was equally gifted in baseball; as a Crimson outfielder, he led the team in batting in 1930 and set Harvard's then-career home-run record (13). Ticknor won the university's Wingate Trophy (presented annually to the highest scorer in safe arrivals at first, stolen bases, sacrifice hits, and total runs) in 1930 and Wendell Bat in 1931.

Harvard football did not see its success of old during Ticknor's era, but he relished the beatings of rival Yale. Ticknor was elected to the College Football Hall of Fame in 1954.
