= Joe Krakoski (defensive back) =

American football player (born 1937)

No. 25, 27
- Position: Defensive back

Personal information
- Born: December 18, 1937 (age 88); Danville, Illinois, U.S.
- Listed height: 6 ft 2 in (1.88 m)
- Listed weight: 195 lb (88 kg)

Career information
- High school: Westville (IL)
- College: Illinois
- NFL draft: 1961: 6th round, 72nd overall pick
- AFL draft: 1961: 18th round, 138th overall pick

Career history
- Washington Redskins (1961); Oakland Raiders (1963-1966)

Career NFL/AFL statistics
- Interceptions: 8
- Sacks: 2
- Stats at Pro Football Reference

Joseph Andrew Krakoski Jr. (Pronounced: KRA-ka-ski) (born December 18, 1937) is an American former professional football player who was a defensive back in the National Football League (NFL) for the Washington Redskins, as well as the Oakland Raiders of the American Football League. Krakoski was a fourteen time letter winner at Westville High School in Westville, Illinois.

He played college football at the University of Illinois where he was a member of Sigma Pi fraternity. He was selected in the sixth round of the 1961 NFL draft, as well as in the 18th round of the 1961 AFL draft.

== Personal life ==
He is the father of former Washington Redskins linebacker, Joe Krakoski.
