= Cornelius Murphy (American football) =

American football player (1909–1931)

Fordham Rams
- Position: Tackle

Personal information
- Born: March 27, 1909; Greenfield, Massachusetts, U.S.
- Died: December 2, 1931 (aged 22); Bronx, New York, New York, U.S.

Career information
- College: Fordham (1930)

Awards and highlights
- First-team All-American (1930)

Cornelius J. "Connie" Murphy (March 27, 1909 – December 2, 1931) was an American football player.

A native of Greenfield, Massachusetts, Murphy was an all-around athlete at Greenfield High School. He attended Deerfield Academy for two years before enrolling at Fordham University. He played at the tackle position for the Fordham Rams football team. As a sophomore, he was selected by the International News Service as a first-team player on the 1930 College Football All-America Team.

As a junior, he sustained a head injury in a football game played against Bucknell at the Polo Grounds on November 21, 1931. He was carried unconscious from the field and was hospitalized for four days. On December 2, he collapsed and died. An autopsy showed that a clot had formed and a blood vessel at the base of his brain had ruptured. He was the fourth university player to die of football injuries in 1931. There is a bronze bust of him on the Fordham campus.
