= Rick Concannon =

American football player (1908–1986)

- Concannon, c. 1929

Profile
- Positions: Guard, tackle

Personal information
- Born: January 12, 1908; Waltham, Massachusetts, U.S.
- Died: June 17, 1986 (age 77)

Career information
- College: NYU

Career history
- 1934–1936: Boston Redskins
- 1936: New York Yankees
- 1937–1938: Boston Shamrocks

Ernest Raymond "Rick" Concannon (January 12, 1908 – June 17, 1986) was an American football player.

Concannon was born in 1908 at Waltham, Massachusetts. He attended Waltham High School and the Dean Academy in Franklin, Massachusetts. He then enrolled at New York University (NYU) where he played college football for the NYU Violets football team from 1929 to 1931. He was captain of the 1931 NYU Violets football team that compiled a 6–3–1 record.

Concannon also played professional football as a guard and tackle in the National Football League (NFL) for the Boston Redskins. He appeared in 25 games for the Redskins during the 1934, 1935, and 1935 seasons. He continued to play professional football in the American Football League for the New York Yankees in 1936 and the Boston Shamrocks in 1937. He concluded his playing career with the Boston West Ends (1937) and Boston Shamrocks (1938).

During World War II, Concannon served in the United States Navy. After the war, he worked for 23 years for the Westin Biscuit Co. of Battle Creek, Michigan. He held positions including production foreman and personnel director. He also served as line coach for the St. Philp Catholic High School football team in Battle Creek from 1945 to 1955. He died in Bradenton, Florida, in 1986.
