= Joe Krakoski (linebacker) =

American football player (born 1962)

No. 54
- Position: Linebacker

Personal information
- Born: November 11, 1962 (age 63); Aurora, Illinois, U.S.

Career information
- College: Washington
- NFL draft: 1985: 6th round, 153rd overall pick

Career history
- 1986: Washington Redskins
- Stats at Pro Football Reference

Joseph Joshua Krakoski (born November 11, 1962) is an American former professional football linebacker in the National Football League (NFL) for the Washington Redskins. He played college football at the University of Washington and was selected by the Houston Oilers in the sixth round of the 1985 NFL draft. Krakoski attended Mission San Jose High School.

== See also ==
- Washington Huskies football statistical leaders
