= Frank Walton (American football) =

American football player and coach (1911–1953)

No. 29, 21
- Positions: Guard, tackle

Personal information
- Born: December 25, 1911; Beaver Falls, Pennsylvania
- Died: September 22, 1953 (aged 41); Beaver Falls, Pennsylvania

Career information
- High school: Beaver Falls (PA)
- College: Pittsburgh

Career history

Playing
- Boston Redskins (1934); Washington Redskins (1944–1945)

Coaching
- Beaver Falls HS (1935–1940) Head coach; Geneva College (1941–1943) Assistant coach; Washington Redskins (1945) Assistant line coach; Colgate (1946) Assistant coach; Pittsburgh Steelers (1947) Line coach; Washington Redskins (1948) Line coach; Richmond Rebels (1950) Head coach; Indiantown Box (1952) Head coach

Operations
- Geneva College (1943) Director of Physical Education and Intramurals; Washington Redskins (1945) Scout

Awards and highlights
- Third-team All-American (1933)

Career statistics
- Games played: 25
- Stats at Pro Football Reference

Frank Joseph "Tiger" Walton (December 25, 1911 – September 22, 1953) was an American football guard and coach. He played three seasons in the National Football League (NFL) for the Boston/Washington Redskins. He played college football at the University of Pittsburgh.

== Early life ==
Walton attended and played high school football at Beaver Falls High School, where he earned honors as an offensive tackle.

== College career ==
Walton attended and played college football at the University of Pittsburgh, where he started for three years as a tackle. He also played in the inaugural College All-Star Game in 1933.

== Professional career ==
=== Playing career ===
After graduating college, Walton signed with Boston Redskins of the National Football League in 1934. Due to the College All-Star Game, he arrived late for training camp. He would make the final roster as a left guard, but retired after one season due to knee injuries.

Due to World War II sapping much of the NFL's players, Walton returned to the league and Redskins in 1944, ending a nine-year absence. During training camp in San Diego, he doubled as an assistant line coach under Turk Edwards before being slotted as the Redskins' primary backup at guard. Against the Cleveland Rams, Walton recovered a fumble that set up a crucial touchdown in a Redskins 14–10 win.

He remained with the Redskins in 1945 and opened the season as their starting right guard. However, his playing career ended a month later on November 7 when he was reassigned as an assistant line coach and scout.

=== Coaching career ===
After his first retirement, Walton returned to Beaver Falls and became the head football coach at Beaver Falls High School in 1935. He also worked as a physical education teacher at the school. Although Beaver Falls enjoyed early success, it declined later in the 1930s and Walton's final season in 1940 saw the team go 0–9 before winning against one-win New Brighton. He resigned at the end of 1940.

In 1941, Walton was hired as an assistant coach by Geneva College. The following year, he split head coaching duties with Cal Hubbard as regular coach Alured Ransom entered military service. In 1943, Walton was named Geneva's Director of Physical Education and Intramurals and oversaw the PE program for United States Army Air Forces trainees stationed at the school. As World War II continued into 1944, he also worked in a war plant.

Walton was hired by Maryland as offensive line coach in July 1945, and the school agreed to let him continue playing for the Redskins. When Maryland head coach Clarence Spears resigned later in the month, Walton expressed interest in taking the job before the school hired Bear Bryant.

After Walton ended his playing career, Redskins coach Dudley DeGroot resigned and Walton followed suit two months later in an amicable parting after speaking with new head coach Edwards. He spent one year as Colgate University's line coach before being hired by the Pittsburgh Steelers in the same position, followed by returning to Washington in 1948. Walton left the Redskins again after one season in the wake of Edwards' departure.

Walton would later coach semi-pro teams such as the Richmond Rebels and Indiantown Gap.

== Personal life ==
Walton secretly married Ida Hendrickson during his senior year at Pittsburgh.

Walton died from cancer on September 22, 1953, at Providence Hospital in Beaver Falls, Pennsylvania. His son, Joe Walton, also played for Beaver Falls High School and Pittsburgh and played and coached for the Redskins. They became the first father-son combo to play in the NFL, and the first father-son duo inducted into the Beaver County Sports Hall of Fame with the older Walton being in the Class of 1977.
