= 1965 Washington Redskins season =

NFL team season

- Owner: George Preston Marshall
- General manager: Bill McPeak
- President: Edward Bennett Williams
- Head coach: Bill McPeak
- Home stadium: D.C. Stadium

Results
- Record: 6–8
- Division place: 4th NFL Eastern
- Playoffs: Did not qualify

The 1965 Washington Redskins season was the franchise's 34th season in the National Football League (NFL) and their 29th in Washington, D.C. After dropping their first five, the Redskins won two-thirds of their remaining games to finish again at 6–8, fourth in the Eastern Conference. This was the first season to feature the arrow logo on the helmet.

== NFL draft ==
1965 Washington Redskins draft
Round	Pick	Player	Position	College	Notes
2	21	Bob Breitenstein	T	Tulsa	
3	34	Kent McCloughan *	DB	Nebraska	
8	105	Don Croftcheck	G	Indiana	
9	118	Jerry Smith *	TE	Arizona State	
10	133	R. L. Briggs	FB	Central State (OK)	
11	146	Willie Adams	DE	New Mexico State	
12	160	John Strohmeyer	T	Nebraska	
13	174	Biff Bracey	HB	Duke	
14	189	Dave Estrada	HB	Arizona State	
15	202	Ben Baldwin	B	Vanderbilt	
16	217	Robert Reed	G	Tennessee State	
17	230	Gary Hart	E	Vanderbilt	
18	245	Chris Hanburger * ^{†}	LB	North Carolina	
19	258	Roosevelt Ellerbe	B	Iowa State	
Made roster † Pro Football Hall of Fame * Made at least one Pro Bowl during career

== Roster ==
1965 Washington Redskins roster
Quarterbacks (QB): 9 Sonny Jurgensen; 14 Dick Shiner; Running backs (RB): 30 Robert Briggs; 35 Rick Casares; 39 George Hughley; 22 Dan Lewis; 42 Charley Taylor; Wide receivers (WR): 48 Angelo Coia; 23 Billy Hunter; 20 Fred Mazurek; 49 Bobby Mitchell; Tight ends (TE): 87 Jerry Smith	Offensive linemen (OL): 45 Don Croftcheck LG; 57 Dave Crossan T/C; 62 Darrell Dess G; 56 Len Hauss C; 61 Fran O'Brien T; 65 Vince Promuto G; 67 Robert Reed G; 74 Jim Snowden T; Defensive linemen (DL): 66 Carl Kammerer DE; 86 John Paluck DE; 85 Bill Quinlan DE; 72 Joe Rutgens DT; 78 Ron Snidow DE/DT; 75 Fred Williams DT	Linebackers (LB): 50 Willie Adams OLB/DE; 21 Jimmy Carr OLB; 55 Chris Hanburger OLB; 70 Sam Huff MLB; 53 Bob Pellegrini OLB; Defensive backs (DB): 46 Rickie Harris CB; 24 Johnny Sample CB; 40 Lonnie Sanders CB; 47 Jim Shorter CB; 41 Jim Steffen SS; 26 Paul Krause FS/WR; 43 Tom Walters FS; Special teams (ST): 81 Bob Jencks K; 38 John Seedborg P	Practice squad: Dick Evers T; Reserve: 89 Preston Carpenter TE (IR); 51 John Reger LB (IR); 88 Pat Richter (IR) WR/P; Rookies in italics

== Preseason ==
Week	Date	Opponent	Result	Record	Venue	Attendance
1	August 7	vs. Philadelphia Eagles	W 37–0	1–0	Hershey Stadium (Hershey, PA)	8,945
2	August 12	Chicago Bears	L 30–31	1–1	D.C. Stadium	45,142
3	August 21	vs. St. Louis Cardinals	W 13–7	1–2	City Stadium (Richmond, VA)	19,000
4	August 28	vs. Minnesota Vikings	L 16–20	2–2	American Legion Memorial Stadium (Charlotte, NC)	20,426
5	September 4	vs. Baltimore Colts	L 23–33	2–3	Foreman Field (Norfolk, VA)	22,176
6	September 12	vs. Detroit Lions	W 20–3	3–3	Fawcett Stadium (Canton, OH)	13,000

== Schedule ==
Week	Date	Opponent	Result	Record	Venue	Attendance	Recap
1	September 19	**Cleveland Browns**	**L** 7–17	0–1	D.C. Stadium	48,208	Recap
2	September 26	at **Dallas Cowboys**	**L** 7–27	0–2	Cotton Bowl	61,577	Recap
3	October 3	at Detroit Lions	**L** 10–14	0–3	Tiger Stadium	52,627	Recap
4	October 10	**St. Louis Cardinals**	**L** 16–37	0–4	D.C. Stadium	50,205	Recap
5	October 17	Baltimore Colts	**L** 7–38	0–5	D.C. Stadium	50,405	Recap
6	October 24	at **St. Louis Cardinals**	**W** 24–20	1–5	Busch Stadium	32,228	Recap
7	October 31	**Philadelphia Eagles**	**W** 23–21	2–5	D.C. Stadium	50,301	Recap
8	November 7	at **New York Giants**	**W** 23–7	3–5	Yankee Stadium	62,788	Recap
9	November 14	at **Philadelphia Eagles**	**L** 14–21	3–6	Franklin Field	60,444	Recap
10	November 21	at **Pittsburgh Steelers**	**W** 31–3	4–6	Forbes Field	25,052	Recap
11	November 28	**Dallas Cowboys**	**W** 34–31	5–6	D.C. Stadium	50,205	Recap
12	December 5	at **Cleveland Browns**	**L** 16–24	5–7	Cleveland Municipal Stadium	77,765	Recap
13	December 12	**New York Giants**	**L** 10–27	5–8	D.C. Stadium	50,373	Recap
14	December 19	**Pittsburgh Steelers**	**W** 35–14	6–8	D.C. Stadium	49,806	Recap
Note: Intra-conference opponents are in **bold** text.

== Standings ==
NFL Eastern Conference
	W	L	T	PCT	CONF	PF	PA	STK
Cleveland Browns	11	3	0	.786	11–1	363	325	W1
Dallas Cowboys	7	7	0	.500	6–6	325	280	W3
New York Giants	7	7	0	.500	7–5	270	338	L1
Washington Redskins	6	8	0	.429	6–6	257	301	W1
Philadelphia Eagles	5	9	0	.357	5–7	363	359	L1
St. Louis Cardinals	5	9	0	.357	5–7	296	309	L6
Pittsburgh Steelers	2	12	0	.143	2–10	202	397	L7

Note: Tie games were not officially counted in the standings until 1972.
