= Washington Commanders draft history =

The Washington Commanders are a professional American football franchise based in the Washington metropolitan area. They are members of the East division in the National Football Conference (NFC) of the National Football League (NFL). The Commanders were founded in 1932 as the Boston Braves, named after the local baseball franchise. The franchise changed its name the following year to the Redskins and moved to Washington, D.C. in 1937. In 2020, the team retired the Redskins name after longstanding controversies surrounding it and briefly played as the Washington Football Team before becoming the Commanders in 2022.

Every year during April, each NFL franchise seeks to add new players to its roster through a collegiate draft known as the "NFL Annual Player Selection Meeting", which is more commonly known as the NFL draft. Teams are ranked in inverse order based on the previous season's record, with the worst record picking first, and the second worst picking second and so on. The two exceptions to this order are made for teams that appeared in the previous Super Bowl; the Super Bowl champion always picks 32nd, and the Super Bowl loser always picks 31st. Teams have the option of trading away their picks to other teams for different picks, players, cash, or a combination thereof. Thus, it is not uncommon for a team's actual draft pick to differ from their assigned draft pick, or for a team to have extra or no draft picks in any round due to these trades.

This is a list of the franchise's selections in the NFL draft. The Boston Redskins were one of the nine original franchises that participated in the 1936 NFL draft, which was the first official draft of the National Football League. The first player ever selected in the draft, Heisman Trophy winner Jay Berwanger, chose not to play professional football. Riley Smith, taken second overall by Washington, is the first drafted player to play in the NFL. The franchise also holds the distinction of being the only team to draft the same player in two different drafts, Cal Rossi.^{[a]}

== Positions ==
Offense
Center	C
End	E
Fullback	FB
Guard	G
Halfback	HB
Long snapper	LS

Offense
Offensive lineman	OL
Offensive tackle	OT
Quarterback	QB
Running back	RB
Tight end	TE
Wide receiver	WR

Defense
Cornerback	CB
Defensive back	DB
Defensive end	DE
Defensive lineman	DL
Defensive tackle	DT
Linebacker	LB
Safety	S

Special teams
Kicker	K
Kickoff returner	KR
Punter	P
Punt returner	PR

== Key ==
Inducted to the Pro Football Hall of Fame
Inducted to the College Football Hall of Fame
Voted one of the 80 Greatest Redskins
Selected to Pro Bowl

== 1930s ==
=== 1937 draft ===
Round	Pick	Player	Position	College
1	2	Riley Smith	FB	Alabama
2	11	Keith Topping	E	Stanford
3	20	Ed Smith	FB	New York
4	29	Paul Tangora	G	Northwestern
5	38	Wilson Groseclose	OT	Texas Christian
6	47	Larry Lutz	OT	California
7	56	Don Irwin	FB	Colgate
8	65	Wayne Millner	E	Notre Dame
9	74	Marcel Saunders	G	Loyola^{[g]}

=== 1937 draft ===
Round	Pick	Player	Position	College
1	6	Sammy Baugh	QB	Texas Christian
2	16	Nello Falaschi	FB	Santa Clara^{[d]}
3	26	Maurice Elder	RB	Kansas State
4	36	Dick Bassi	G	Santa Clara^{[d]}
5	46	Chuck Bond	OT	Washington
6	56	Jimmie Cain	RB	Washington
7	66	Rotta Holland	G	Kansas State
8	76	Joel Eaves	E	Auburn
9	86	Bill Docherty	OT	Temple
10	96	Mac Cara	E	North Carolina State

=== 1938 draft ===
Round	Pick	Player	Position	College
1	9	Andy Farkas	RB	Detroit Mercy^{[e]}
3	24	Sam Chapman	RB	California
5	39	Dave Price	C	Mississippi State
6	49	Elmer Dohrmann	E	Nebraska
7	59	Roy Young	G	Texas A&M
8	69	Bill Hartman	RB	Georgia
9	79	Ed Parks	C	Oklahoma
10	89	Jack Abbitt	RB	Elon
11	99	Dick Johnson	E	Washington
12	109	Hank Bartos	G	North Carolina

=== 1939 draft ===
Round	Pick	Player	Position	College
1	8	I. B. Hale	OT	Texas Christian
3	23	Charlie Holm	RB	Alabama
5	38	Dick Todd	RB	Texas A&M
6	48	Dave Anderson	RB	California
7	58	Quinton Lumpkin	C	Georgia
8	68	Bo Russell	OT	Auburn
9	78	Wilbur Moore	HB	Minnesota
10	88	Jimmy Johnston	RB	Washington
11	98	Jim German	RB	Centre
12	108	Bob O'Mara	RB	Duke
13	118	Steve Slivinski	G	Washington
14	128	Bob Hoffman	RB	Southern California
15	138	Eric Tipton	RB	Duke
16	148	Dick Farman	OT	Washington State
17	158	Clyde Shugart	OT	Iowa State
18	168	Boyd Morgan	RB	Southern California
19	178	Phil Smith	OT	St. Benedict's
20	188	Paul Coop	OT	Centre
21	193	Matt Kuber	G	Villanova
22	198	Al Cruver	RB	Washington State

== 1940s ==
=== 1940 draft ===
Round	Pick	Player	Position	College
1	8	Ed Boell	QB	New York
3	23	Buddy Banker	RB	Tulane
5	38	Bill Kirchem	OT	Tulane
6	48	Joe Boyd	OT	Texas A&M
7	58	Roy Zimmerman	QB	San José State
8	68	Bud Orf	E	Missouri
9	78	Bob Hoffman	RB	Southern California
10	88	Bob Seymour	RB	Oklahoma
11	98	Howard Stoecker	OT	Southern California
12	108	Allen Johnson	G	Duke
13	118	Sam Bartholomew	RB	Tennessee
14	128	Ernie Lain	RB	Rice
15	138	Sandy Sanford	E	Alabama
16	148	Bolo Perdue	E	Duke
17	158	Steve Andrako	C	Ohio State
18	168	Jay Graybeal	RB	Oregon
19	178	Charley Slagle	RB	North Carolina
20	188	Buck Murphy	RB	Georgia Tech
21	193	Mel Wetzel	OT	Missouri
22	198	Steve Sitko	QB	Notre Dame

=== 1941 draft ===
Round	Pick	Player	Position	College
1	10	Forest Evashevski	RB	Michigan
3	25	Fred Davis	OT	Alabama
5	40	Jim Stuart	OT	Oregon
6	50	Ed Cifers	E	Tennessee
7	60	Al Krueger	E	Southern California
8	70	Henry Wilder	RB	Iowa State
9	80	Bill Grimmett	E	Tulsa
10	90	Ed Hickerson	G	Alabama
11	100	Joe Aguirre	E	St. Mary's (Cal.)^{[t]}
12	110	Jack Banta	HB	Southern California
13	120	Roy Conn	OT	Arizona
14	130	Deward Tornell	RB	San José State
15	140	Morris Buckingham	C	San José State
16	150	Ken Dow	FB	Oregon State
17	160	Stan McRae	E	Michigan State
18	170	Joe Osmanski	FB	Holy Cross
19	180	Earl Fullilove	OT	Georgetown
20	190	Ed Hiestand	E	Vanderbilt
21	195	Tom Riggs	OT	Illinois
22	200	Lee Gentry	HB	Tulsa

=== 1942 draft ===
Round	Pick	Player	Position	College
1	6	Spec Sanders	HB	Texas
3	21	Rufus Deal	RB	Auburn
5	36	Joe Zeno	G	Holy Cross
6	46	Harley McCollum	OT	Tulane
7	56	Bob Fitch	E	Minnesota
8	66	George Peters	RB	Oregon State
9	76	Frank Swiger	RB	Duke
10	86	John Goodyear	RB	Marquette
11	96	Al DeMao	C	Duquesne
12	106	Phil Ahwesh	RB	Duquesne
13	116	John Kovatch	E	Notre Dame
14	126	Bill DeCorrevont	RB	Northwestern
15	136	Marvin Whited	G	Oklahoma
16	146	Dee Chipman	RB	Brigham Young
17	156	George Watts	OT	Appalachian State
18	166	Gene Stewart	RB	Willamette
19	176	Charlie Timmons	FB	Clemson
20	186	Tiny Croft	OT	Ripon
21	191	Steve Juzwik	HB	Notre Dame
22	196	Al Couppee	G	Iowa

=== 1943 draft ===
Round	Pick	Player	Position	College
1	10	Jack Jenkins	FB	Vanderbilt
3	25	Bill Dutton	HB	Pittsburgh
5	40	Bob Dove	DE	Notre Dame
6	50	Wally Ziemba	C	Notre Dame
7	60	Lou Rymkus	OT	Notre Dame
8	70	Tony Leon	G	Alabama
9	80	Bob Motl	E	Northwestern
10	90	Walt McDonald	DB	Tulane
11	100	George Perpich	OT	Georgetown
12	110	Dan Wood	C	Mississippi
13	120	Harry Wright	G	Notre Dame
14	130	Oscar Britt	G	Mississippi
15	140	Dick Weber	G	Syracuse
16	150	Joe Day	RB	Oregon State
17	160	Frank Dornfield	RB	Georgetown
18	170	John Baklarz	OT	Arizona State
19	180	Leo Mogus	E	Youngstown State
20	190	Dick Secrest	RB	Rochester
21	200	Don Nolander	C	Minnesota
22	210	Johnny Barrett	RB	Georgetown
23	220	Tom Vohs	OT	Colgate
24	230	Charlie Yancey	RB	Mississippi State
25	240	Roman Bentz	G	Tulane
26	250	Swifty Berthold	E	Syracuse
27	260	Vince Pacewic	HB	Loyola^{[g]}
28	270	Joe Riccardi	OT	Ohio
29	280	John Jaffurs	G	Penn State
30	290	Frank Akins	FB	Washington State
31	295	Bill Corry	RB	Florida
32	300	Bo Bogovich	G	Delaware

=== 1944 draft ===
Round	Pick	Player	Position	College
1	8	Mike Micka	FB	Colgate
3	23	Earl Audet	OT	Southern California
5	39	Ed Doherty	RB	Boston College
6	50	Jackie Fellows	RB	Fresno State
7	61	Hal Fischer	G	Texas
8	72	Cliff White	OT	Murray State
9	83	Ted Ogdahl	RB	Willamette
10	94	Bob Sneddon	DB	St. Mary's (Cal.)^{[t]}
11	105	Bill Aldworth	OT	Minnesota
12	116	William G. Joslyn	RB	Stanford
13	127	Charley Walker	C	Kentucky
14	138	Boyd Clement	C	Oregon State
15	149	Jim Gaffney	QB	Tennessee
16	160	Ted Ossowski	OT	Oregon State
17	171	Tom Davis	RB	Duke
18	182	John Batorski	E	Colgate
19	193	Clyde Ehrhardt	C	Georgia
20	204	Dave Brown	E	UCLA
21	215	Bill Ivy	OT	Northwestern
22	226	Bruce Babcock	RB	Rochester
23	237	Bill Reinhard	DB	California
24	248	Ed Bauer	G	South Carolina
25	259	Joe Martin	RB	Cornell
26	270	Lee Gustafson	RB	Oregon State
27	281	Nick Pappas	OT	Utah
28	292	Lindsey Bowen	E	Rice
29	303	Bill Gustafson	OT	Washington State
30	314	Bill Yablonski	C	Holy Cross
31	320	Buster Hollingbery	C	Washington State
32	326	Willard Sheller	RB	Stanford

=== 1945 draft ===
Round	Pick	Player	Position	College
1	8	Jim Hardy	QB	Southern California
3	23	John Adams	OT	Notre Dame
5	38	George Bujan	C	Oregon
6	51	John North	E	Vanderbilt
7	61	John Steber	G	Georgia Tech
8	71	Art Porter	E	Tulane
9	84	Curt Kuykendall	RB	Auburn
10	94	Frank Brogger	E	Michigan State
11	104	Mack Creger	RB	Northwestern
12	117	Paul McKee	E	Syracuse
13	127	Charlie Conerly	QB	Mississippi
14	137	John Putnik	E	Utah State
15	150	Eddie Saenz	HB	Southern California
16	160	Dom Fusci	OT	South Carolina
17	170	Bobby Jenkins	RB	Alabama
18	183	Ed Stacco	OT	Colgate
19	193	Jim Bradshaw	C	Auburn
20	203	Bill Shipkey	RB	Stanford
21	216	Sid Halliday	OT	Southern Methodist
22	226	Chick Davidson	OT	Cornell
23	236	Gabby Martin	E	Southern Methodist
24	249	Jim McCurdy	C	Stanford
25	259	Cecil Souders	E	Ohio State
26	269	Ben Wall	RB	Western Michigan
27	282	George Hillery	E	Texas-El Paso
28	292	Milford Dreblow	RB	Southern California
29	302	Frank Irwin	OT	Duke
30	315	Leon Diner	E	Denver
31	320	Bob Cummings	C	Vanderbilt
32	325	Don Nolander	C	Minnesota

=== 1946 draft ===
Round	Pick	Player	Position	College
1	9	Cal Rossi^{[a]}	RB	UCLA
3	24	Stan Kozlowski	FB	Holy Cross
5	39	Gay Adelt	RB	Utah
6	49	Walt Trojanowski	RB	Connecticut
7	59	Bob Hendren	OT	Southern California
8	69	George Callanan	RB	Southern California
9	79	Bob Skoglund	E	Notre Dame
10	89	Jake Leicht	HB	Oregon
11	99	Chick Maggioli	DB	Illinois
12	109	Monte Moncrief	OT	Texas A&M
13	119	Joe Tereshinski	DE	Georgia
14	129	Stan Sprague	E	Illinois
15	139	Harry Adelman	E	Southern California
16	149	Bob Butchofsky	RB	Texas A&M
17	159	Mike Prashaw	OT	Michigan
18	169	Ed Robnett	FB	Texas Tech
19	179	LeMar Dykstra	RB	Colorado
20	189	Bob Ward	RB	San José State
21	199	John Pehar	OT	Southern California
22	209	Roger Robinson	DB	Syracuse
23	219	Charley Cadenhead	C	Mississippi State
24	229	Bob Rados	G	Santa Clara^{[d]}
25	239	Charlie Webb	E	Louisiana State
26	249	Marion Flanagan	RB	Texas A&M
27	259	Roland Phillips	OT	Georgia Tech
28	269	Jim Hallmark	RB	Texas A&M
29	279	Fay Mills	OT	Alabama
30	289	William Ritter	RB	Georgia Tech
31	294	Sarkis Takesian	RB	California
32	299	Mike Campbell	E	Mississippi

=== 1947 draft ===
Round	Pick	Player	Position	College
1	4	Cal Rossi^{[a]}	RB	UCLA
3	17	Red Knight	RB	Louisiana State
5	28	Hank Foldberg	E	Army
6	39	Mike Garzoni	G	Southern California
7	48	Bill Gray	G	Oregon State
8	59	Hank Harris	G	Texas
9	68	Roy Kurrasch	E	UCLA
10	79	Ernie Williamson	OT	North Carolina
11	88	L. G. Carmody	RB	Central Washington
12	99	U. S. Savage	E	Richmond
13	108	Bob Steckroth	E	William & Mary
14	119	Weldon Edwards	OT	Texas Christian
15	128	Earl Wheeler	C	Arkansas
16	139	Billy Gold	RB	Tennessee
17	148	Jack Hart	OT	Detroit Mercy^{[e]}
18	159	Tom Nichols	RB	Richmond
19	168	Harry Dowda	DB	Wake Forest
20	179	Charlie Webb	E	Louisiana State
21	188	Elmo Bond	OT	Washington State
22	199	Jim Hefti	RB	St. Lawrence
23	208	Tom Dudley	E	Virginia
24	219	Bob Smith	DB	Iowa
25	228	Hal Mullins	OT	Duke
26	239	Francis Bocoka	E	Washington State
27	248	Otis Sacrinty	RB	Wake Forest
28	259	Milt Dropo	C	Connecticut
29	268	Lynn Brownson	RB	Stanford
30	279	Joe Colone	RB	Penn State
31	286	Herb Shoener	E	Iowa
32	295	Bob Pievo	OT	Purdue

=== 1948 draft ===
Round	Pick	Player	Position	College
1	1	Harry Gilmer	QB	Alabama
1	4	Lowell Tew	FB	Alabama
3	16	Tommy Thompson	LB	William & Mary
5	28	Dan Sandifer	DB	Louisiana State
6	38	Jack Weisenburger	RB	Michigan
7	48	Jack Kurkowski	RB	Detroit Mercy^{[e]}
8	58	Gerry Cady	OT	Gustavus Adolphus
9	68	Bob Anderson	RB	Stanford
10	78	Mike Katrishen	G	Southern Mississippi
11	88	Ed Marshall	OT	Pennsylvania
12	98	Ted Andrus	G	Southwestern Louisiana^{[s]}
13	108	Carl Suss	RB	Rice
14	118	Chick Jagade	FB	Indiana
15	128	Ed Quirk	FB	Missouri
16	138	Art Pollard	RB	Arizona
17	148	Chuck Newman	E	Louisiana Tech
17	151	Dale Schwartzkoph	E	Texas Tech
18	158	Ray Pearcy	C	Oklahoma
19	168	Gene Vellela	OT	Scranton^{[i]}
20	178	Cloyce Box	E	West Texas State^{[v]}
21	188	Brian Bell	RB	Washington & Lee
22	198	Joel Williams	C	Texas
23	208	Lou Holtsma	E	William & Mary
24	218	Floyd Lawhorn	G	Texas Tech
25	228	Dick West	RB	Princeton
26	238	Roland Oakes	E	Missouri
27	248	Ed Watkins	OT	Idaho
28	258	Don Corbitt	C	Arizona
29	268	Buddy Bowen	RB	Mississippi
30	278	Vic Paulson	E	California-Santa Barbara^{[l]}
31	286	Barney Welch	RB	Texas A&M

=== 1949 draft ===
Round	Pick	Player	Position	College
1	8	Rob Goode	RB	Texas A&M
2	18	Laurie Niemi	OT	Washington State
3	28	Len Szafaryn	OT	North Carolina
4	38	Mike DeNoia	RB	Scranton^{[i]}
5	48	Ed Berrang	DE	Villanova
7	68	Chet Fritz	G	Missouri
8	78	Bob Kennedy	DB	North Carolina
9	88	Ed McNeill	E	Michigan
10	98	Vic Vasicek	LB	Texas
11	108	Homer Hobbs	G	Georgia
12	118	Harry Varner	OT	Arizona
13	128	Ed Henke	DE	Southern California
14	138	Pat Haggerty	E	William & Mary
15	148	Gene Frassetto	OT	California
16	158	Dick Flowers	OT	Alabama
17	168	Ross Pritchard	RB	Arkansas
18	178	Herb Siegert	G	Illinois
19	188	Bob Hainlen	RB	Colorado State
20	198	Oliver Fletcher	G	Southern California
21	208	Tommy Hughes	RB	Duke
22	218	Bill Clements	E	UCLA
23	228	Frank Pattee	RB	Kansas
24	238	Jim Cullom	G	California
25	248	Nick Sebek	QB	Indiana

== 1950s ==
=== 1950 draft ===
Round	Pick	Player	Position	College
1	6	George Thomas	HB	Oklahoma
2	19	Hall Haynes	DB	Santa Clara^{[d]}
3	32	Lou Karras	DT	Purdue
4	45	Harry Ulinski	C	Kentucky
5	58	Frank Spaniel	HB	Notre Dame
6	71	Gene Pepper	G	Missouri
7	84	Jerry Houghton	OT	Washington State
8	97	John Rohde	E	Pacific^{[h]}
9	110	Don Winslow	OT	Iowa
10	123	Eddie LeBaron	QB	Pacific^{[h]}
11	136	Danny Brown	DE	Villanova
12	149	Bill Chauncey	RB	Iowa State
13	162	Clay Davis	C	Oklahoma State
14	175	Lyle Button	OT	Illinois
15	188	Alex Loyd	E	Oklahoma State
16	201	Charlie Justice	HB	North Carolina
17	214	Jim Cullom	G	California
18	227	Alvin Duke	RB	Arkansas
19	240	Ed White	E	Alabama
20	253	George Bayer	OT	Washington
21	266	Casimir Witucki	G	Indiana
22	279	John deLaurentis	OT	Waynesburg
23	292	Joe Zuravleff	E	Northwestern
24	305	Dick Tilton	OT	Nevada
25	318	Art Stewart	RB	SE Oklahoma State
26	331	Earl Roth	RB	Maryland
27	344	Ed Lee	OT	Kansas
28	357	Ralph Shoaf	RB	West Virginia
29	370	Johnny Lundin	G	Minnesota
30	383	Bob Noppinger	E	Georgetown

=== 1950 AAFC dispersal draft ===
The dispersal draft gave NFL teams the league rights to the players from teams in the dissolved All-America Football Conference.

Round	Pick	Player	Position	College	AAFC team
1	5	Jim Spavital	FB	Oklahoma A&M	Los Angeles Dons
2	18	Chuck Drazenovich	FB	Penn State	Los Angeles Dons
3	31	Roland Dale	OT	Mississippi	Brooklyn Dodgers
4	48	Lloyd Eisenberg	OT	Duke	Los Angeles Dons
5	61	Hardy Brown	FB	Tulsa	Chicago Hornets
6	76	Ed Hirsch	LB	Northwestern	Buffalo Bills
7	89	Ed Smith	HB	Texas Mines	New York Yanks
9	117	Murray Alexander	E	Mississippi State	Brooklyn Dodgers
10	132	Dewey Nelson	HB	Utah	New York Bulldogs

=== 1951 draft ===
Round	Pick	Player	Position	College
1	4	Leon Heath	FB	Oklahoma
2	15	Ed Salem	DB	Alabama
2	21	Jim Staton	DT	Wake Forest
3	29	Walt Yowarsky	DE	Kentucky
4	40	Paul Giroski	OT	Rice
6	65	John Martinkovic	DE	Xavier^{[w]}
7	76	John Papit	HB	Virginia
8	87	Bill Cox	DE	Duke
9	101	Jake Rowden	C	Maryland
10	111	James Janosek	T	Purdue
11	124	Bill DeChard	RB	Holy Cross
12	138	Al Applegate	G	Scranton^{[i]}
13	149	Dick Campbell	RB	Wyoming
15	174	Vic Thomas	OT	Colorado
16	185	Bob Bates	C	Texas A&M
17	196	Gene Brito	DE	Loyola^{[g]}
18	210	Dom Fucci	DB	Kentucky
19	221	Buddy Brown	G	Arkansas
20	232	John Kerestes	RB	Purdue
21	246	Clarence Marable	OT	Texas Christian
22	257	Elliot Speed	C	Alabama
23	268	Cecil Martin	RB	North Texas State^{[c]}
24	282	Tom Powers	RB	Duke
25	293	Bob Chubb	E	Shippensburg
26	304	Johnny Williams	DB	Southern California
27	318	Bill Johnson	RB	Stetson
28	329	John Kadiec	G	Missouri
29	340	Art Stewart	RB	Southeastern Oklahoma
30	354	Nick Bolkovac	DT	Pittsburgh

=== 1952 draft ===
Round	Pick	Player	Position	College
1	7	Larry Isbell	RB	Baylor
2	19	Andy Davis	DB	George Washington^{[b]}
3	31	Al Dorow	QB	Michigan State
4	43	Dick Hightower	C	Southern Methodist
5	55	Jim Clark	OT	Oregon State
6	67	Ed Kensler	G	Maryland
7	79	Vic Janowicz	HB	Ohio State
8	91	Hubert Johnston	OT	Iowa
9	103	Dick Alban	DB	Northwestern
10	115	Chet Ostrowski	DE	Notre Dame
11	127	Orlando Mazza	E	Michigan State
12	139	Frank Middendorf	C	Cincinnati
13	151	Ray Potter	OT	Louisiana State
14	163	Doug Conway	OT	Texas Christian
15	175	Julius Wittman	OT	Ohio State
16	187	Marv Berschet	G	Illinois
17	199	Gil Bocetti	RB	Washington & Lee
18	211	Ed Bartlett	E	California
19	223	Joe Marvin	RB	UCLA
20	235	Roger Kinson	C	Missouri
21	247	Dick Jenkins	OT	Illinois
22	259	Jim O'Rourke	RB	North Carolina State
23	271	Ken Barfield	OT	Mississippi
24	283	Ted Kirkland	E	Vanderbilt
25	295	Sal Gero	OT	Elon
26	307	Danny Goode	RB	Hardin–Simmons
27	319	Ben White	E	Southern Methodist
28	331	Ron Engel	RB	Minnesota
29	343	John Pappa	RB	California
30	355	Bob Linn	RB	Case Western Reserve

=== 1953 draft ===
Round	Pick	Player	Position	College
1	3	Jack Scarbath	QB	Maryland
2	16	Dick Modzelewski	DT	Maryland
3	27	Paul Dekker	E	Michigan State
4	40	Don Boll	OT	Nebraska
5	51	Nick Carras	RB	Missouri
8	88	Lew Weidensaul	E	Maryland
11	123	Alex Webster	HB	North Carolina State
12	136	Buzz Nutter	C	Virginia Tech
14	160	Ed Timmerman	RB	Michigan State
15	171	Dave Suminski	G	Wisconsin
16	184	Jim Slay	E	Mississippi
17	195	Bob Haner	RB	Villanova
18	208	Jim Turner	RB	Texas Tech
19	219	Tom Flyzik	OT	George Washington^{[b]}
20	232	Bill Link	G	Wake Forest
21	243	Jim Dublinski	C	Utah
22	256	Ed Pucci	G	Southern California
23	267	Ed Bierne	E	Detroit Mercy^{[e]}
24	280	Stan Butterworth	RB	Bucknell
25	291	Art Hurd	G	Maryland
26	304	Walt Ashcraft	OT	Southern California
27	315	John Zanetti	OT	John Carroll
28	328	Bob Buckley	RB	Southern California
29	339	Pat Shires	RB	Tennessee
30	352	Bob Mathias	RB	Stanford

=== 1954 draft ===
Round	Pick	Player	Position	College
1	8	Steve Meilinger	E	Kentucky
2	20	Jim Schrader	C	Notre Dame
4	39	Ralph Felton	LB	Maryland
5	56	Billy Wells	HB	Michigan State
6	68	Bill McHenry	C	Washington & Lee
7	80	Harry Jagielski	DT	Indiana
8	92	Bill Marker	E	West Virginia
9	104	Jerry Minnick	OT	Nebraska
10	116	Merrill Green	RB	Oklahoma
11	128	Gene Wilson	RB	South Carolina
12	140	Ben Dunkerley	OT	West Virginia
13	152	Roger Dornburg	RB	Wisconsin
14	164	Roger Nelson	OT	Oklahoma
15	176	Hugh Merck	OT	South Carolina
16	188	Gilmer Spring	E	Texas
17	200	Jerry Coody	RB	Baylor
18	212	Walt Cudzik	C	Purdue
19	224	Jerry Witt	RB	Wisconsin
20	236	Sam Morley	E	Stanford
21	248	John Cavaglieri	OT	North Texas State^{[c]}
22	260	Max Schmaling	RB	Purdue
23	272	Pete Carrieri	G	Villanova
24	284	Will Renfro	DT	Memphis State^{[f]}
25	296	George Rosso	DB	Ohio State
26	308	Dorsey Gibson	RB	Oklahoma State
27	320	Ken Yarborough	E	North Carolina
28	332	Ron Hansen	G	Minnesota
29	344	Ted Kress	RB	Michigan
30	356	Don Rondou	RB	Northwestern

=== 1955 draft ===
Round	Pick	Player	Position	College
1	4	Ralph Guglielmi	QB	Notre Dame
3	28	Ray Perkins	HB	Syracuse
5	52	Don Glantz	OT	Nebraska
7	76	Erik Christensen	DE	Richmond
7	80	Ron Marciniak	G	Kansas State
8	87	Johnny Allen	C	Purdue
9	100	John Miller	OT	Boston College
10	111	Tom Louderback	LB	San José State
11	124	Larry Parker	RB	North Carolina
12	135	John Barish	OT	Waynesburg
13	148	Len Oniskey	OT	Cornell
14	159	Tom Braatz	LB	Marquette
15	172	Charles Horton	RB	Vanderbilt
16	183	Hal Norris	LB	California
17	196	Don Shea	G	Georgia
18	207	Don Bailey	RB	Penn State
19	220	Bob Dee	DE	Holy Cross
20	231	Ron Geyer	OT	Michigan
21	244	Buck George	RB	Clemson
22	255	Joe Boland	RB	George Washington^{[b]}
23	268	Chick Donaldson	C	West Virginia
24	279	Bob Ready	OT	Notre Dame
25	292	Frank Radella	C	Wyoming
26	303	Walt Houston	G	Purdue
27	316	A. J. Baker	RB	Arkansas
28	327	Arch Cassidy	OT	Florida
29	340	Bing Bordier	E	Southern California
30	351	Tom Petty	E	Virginia Tech

=== 1956 draft ===
Round	Pick	Player	Position	College
1	12	Ed Vereb	HB	Maryland
2	24	John Paluck	DE	Pittsburgh
3	36	Fred Wyant	QB	West Virginia
4	41	Francis Machinsky	OT	Ohio State
5	59	Gary Lowe	DB	Michigan State
7	83	Donnie Caraway	RB	Houston
8	94	Dick James	HB	Oregon
9	107	Whitey Rouviere	RB	Miami (FL)
11	131	Tom Powell	G	Colgate
12	141	Jerry Planutis	HB	Michigan State
12	142	Gil Moreno	OT	UCLA
13	155	Jerry Ward	G	Dayton
14	166	Pat Uebel	RB	Army
16	190	Wells Gray	G	Wisconsin
17	203	Eagle Day	QB	Mississippi
18	214	Jim Pyburn	E	Auburn
19	227	Ray Lemek	OT	Notre Dame
20	238	Vince Gonzalez	RB	Louisiana State
21	251	Howard Schnellenberger	E	Kentucky
22	262	George Nicula	OT	Notre Dame
23	275	Don St. John	RB	Xavier^{[w]}
24	286	Johnny Tatum	C	Texas
25	299	Franklin Brooks	G	Georgia Tech
26	310	Dave Burnham	RB	Wheaton
27	323	Royce Flippin	RB	Princeton
28	334	Billy Hicks	RB	Alabama
29	347	Pat Bisceglia	G	Notre Dame
30	357	Buck Nystrom	G	Michigan State

=== 1957 draft ===
Round	Pick	Player	Position	College
1	9	Don Bosseler	FB	Miami (FL)
2	21	Joe Walton	E	Pittsburgh
3	33	Ed Sutton	HB	North Carolina
4	40	Jim Podoley	HB	Central Michigan
4	45	Vince Scorsone	G	Pittsburgh
6	69	J. T. Frankenberger	OT	Kentucky
7	81	Wally Merz	OT	Colorado
8	93	Paul Lopata	E	Central Michigan
9	105	Galen Laack	G	Pacific^{[h]}
10	117	Don Dobrino	RB	Iowa
11	129	Dick Foster	OT	Idaho
12	141	Wade Mitchell	QB	Georgia Tech
13	153	Claude Austin	RB	George Washington^{[b]}
14	165	George Rice	OT	Wofford
15	177	Brad Bomba	E	Indiana
16	189	Joe Brodsky	RB	Florida
17	201	Fred Brock	RB	Wheaton
18	213	Ed Sakach	G	George Washington^{[b]}
19	225	John Bauer	RB	Villanova
20	237	Buddy Frick	E	South Carolina
21	249	Sam Owen	RB	Georgia Tech
22	261	Ed Voytek	G	Purdue
23	273	Al Viola	G	Northwestern
24	285	Bob Jennings	C	Furman
25	297	Dick Sassels	OT	Catawba
26	309	Paul Rotenberry	RB	Georgia Tech
27	321	Ormand Anderson	OT	Georgia Tech
28	333	Guy Martin	RB	Colgate
29	345	George Benedict	E	Springfield
30	356	Art Luppino	RB	Arizona

=== 1958 draft ===
Round	Pick	Player	Position	College
2	16	Mike Sommer	HB	George Washington^{[b]}
3	28	Stan Flowers	RB	Georgia Tech
3	31	Bill Anderson	E	Tennessee
4	40	Dan Nolan	QB	Lehigh
5	54	Jim Van Pelt	QB	Michigan
6	66	Dick Lynch	DB	Notre Dame
7	78	Leon Bennett	OT	Boston College
8	90	Buddy Payne	E	North Carolina
9	102	Frank Kuchta	LB	Notre Dame
10	114	Ben Preston	OT	Auburn
11	126	Darrell Dess	G	North Carolina State
12	138	Eddie Michaels	G	Villanova
13	150	Ken Ford	QB	Hardin–Simmons
14	162	Jack Faris	E	Penn State
15	174	Jack Davis	G	Arizona
16	186	Fred Polzer	E	Virginia
17	198	Fred Wilt	OT	Richmond
18	210	Lennie King	RB	Connecticut
19	222	Don Stephenson	C	Georgia Tech
20	234	Lou Pelham	E	Florida
21	246	Jackie Simpson	LB	Mississippi
22	258	Charley Sanders	RB	West Texas State^{[v]}
23	270	Ron Schomburger	E	Florida State
24	282	Rod Hanson	E	Illinois
25	294	John Groom	G	Texas Christian
26	306	Frank Bloomquist	G	Iowa
27	318	Perry Gehring	E	Minnesota
28	330	Joe Biggs	G	Hardin–Simmons
29	342	Ed Coffin	RB	Syracuse
30	353	Ted Smith	E	Georgia Tech

=== 1959 draft ===
Round	Pick	Player	Position	College
1	4	Don Allard	QB	Boston College
3	28	Emil Karas	LB	Dayton
4	40	Jim Wood	E	Oklahoma State
5	49	Bob Wetoska	OT	Notre Dame
6	65	Jim McFalls	OT	Virginia Military Institute
7	76	Don Lawrence	DT	Notre Dame
7	79	Mitch Ogiego	QB	Iowa
7	81	Jim Kenney	E	Boston University^{[k]}
8	89	Gene O'Pella	E	Villanova
9	100	Dick Haley	DB	Pittsburgh
10	113	Ron Togh	RB	Notre Dame
11	124	Jerry Marciniak	G	Michigan
12	137	Roger Wypyszynski	OT	St. Norbert
13	148	Billy Shoemake	E	Louisiana State
14	161	Kurt Schwarz	G	Maryland
15	172	Fred Hood	E	Northeastern State
16	185	Dick Splain	OT	New Haven
17	196	Jim Healy	G	Holy Cross
18	209	Joe Kapp	QB	California
19	220	Bobby Lauder	RB	Auburn
20	233	Homer Brewer	DB	Mississippi
21	244	Mel Reight	RB	West Virginia
22	257	Art Gob	DE	Pittsburgh
23	268	Clarence Alexander	RB	Southeastern Louisiana
24	281	George Darrah	RB	Franklin & Marshall
25	292	Bob Sargent	OT	Colby
26	305	Gene Grabosky	DT	Syracuse
27	316	Norm Odyniec	RB	Notre Dame
28	329	Bill Austin	RB	Rutgers
29	340	Don Lockwood	G	Tulane
30	353	Jim Colclough	E	Boston College

== 1960s ==
=== 1960 draft ===
Round	Pick	Player	Position	College
1	4	Richie Lucas	QB	Penn State
2	21	Sam Horner	HB	Virginia Military Institute
3	28	Andy Stynchula	OT	Penn State
4	48	Vince Promuto	G	Holy Cross
5	52	Don Stallings	OT	North Carolina
6	64	Dave Hudson	E	Florida
8	87	Earl Kohlhaas	G	Penn State
9	100	Dwight Bumgarner	E	Duke
11	124	Jim Elfrid	C	Colorado State
12	136	Jim Crotty	HB	Notre Dame
13	148	Bill Herron	E	Georgia
14	160	Charlie Milstead	RB	Texas A&M
15	172	Bernie Darre	G	Tulane
16	184	Joe Kulbacki	RB	Purdue
17	196	Billy Roland	G	Georgia
18	208	John Lawrence	G	North Carolina State
19	220	Ron Maltony	G	Purdue
20	232	Jimmy Wolf	HB	Panhandle State

=== 1961 draft ===
Round	Pick	Player	Position	College
1	2	Norm Snead	QB	Wake Forest
1	3	Joe Rutgens	DT	Illinois
3	39	Jim Cunningham	FB	Pittsburgh
6	72	Joe Krakoski	DB	Illinois
6	73	John O'Day	OT	Miami (FL)
7	87	Jim Kerr	DB	Penn State
8	101	Charley Barnes	E	Northeast Louisiana^{[q]}
9	115	Joel Arrington	RB	Duke
11	143	Riley Mattson	OT	Oregon
12	157	Bob Coolbaugh	WR	Richmond
13	171	Doug Elmore	P	Mississippi
14	185	Doyle Schick	CB	Kansas
15	199	Bob Johnson	E	Michigan
16	213	Ron Petty	OT	Louisville
17	227	Joe Bellino	HB	Navy
18	241	George Tolford	OT	Ohio State
19	255	Tony Romeo	TE	Florida State
20	269	Mike Ingram	G	Ohio State

=== 1962 draft ===
Round	Pick	Player	Position	College
1	1	Ernie Davis	RB	Syracuse
2	15	Joe Hernandez	WR	Arizona
3	29	Robert Mitinger	LB	Penn State
4	43	Billy Neighbors	G	Alabama
7	85	Bert Coan	HB	Kansas
8	99	Ron Hatcher	FB	Michigan State
9	113	Dave Viti	E	Boston University^{[k]}
10	127	John Childress	G	Arkansas
11	141	Carl Palazzo	OT	Adams State
12	155	Terry Terrebonne	HB	Tulane
13	169	Bill Whisler	E	Iowa
14	183	Jim Costen	HB	South Carolina
15	197	Len Velia	OT	Georgia
16	211	Tommy Brooker	E	Alabama
17	225	Allen Miller	LB	Ohio
18	239	Carl Charon	DB	Michigan State
19	253	Claude Crabb	DB	Colorado
20	267	Ed Trancygier	QB	Florida State

=== 1963 draft ===
Round	Pick	Player	Position	College
1	7	Pat Richter	TE	Wisconsin
2	22	Lonnie Sanders	CB	Michigan State
3	35	Ron Snidow	DE	Oregon
6	78	Charley Nickoson	OT	Ohio
7	91	Dave Francis	FB	Ohio State
9	119	Billy Joe	RB	Villanova
10	134	Rod Foster	G	Ohio State
11	147	Allen Schau	E	Western Michigan
12	162	Bob Caldwell	C	Georgia Tech
13	175	John Greiner	E	Purdue
14	190	Tom Winingder	RB	Georgia Tech
15	203	Harry Butsko	LB	Maryland
16	218	Dave Adams	G	Arkansas
17	231	Ron Whaley	DB	Tennessee-Chattanooga
18	246	Drew Roberts	E	Cal State-Humboldt
19	259	Jim Turner	K	Utah State
20	274	Joe Baughan	OT	Auburn

=== 1964 draft ===
Round	Pick	Player	Position	College
1	3	Charley Taylor	WR	Arizona State
2	18	Paul Krause	S	Iowa
5	59	Jim Snowden	OT	Notre Dame
6	74	Russ Brown	E	Florida
7	87	Dick Shiner	QB	Maryland
9	115	Len Hauss	C	Georgia
10	130	Rick Leeson	RB	Pittsburgh
11	143	Gene Donaldson	RB	Purdue
12	158	Bob Avolerin	OT	Tennessee
13	171	Tom McDonald	RB	Notre Dame
14	186	Tom Urbanik	RB	Penn State
15	199	Dick Evers	OT	Colorado State
16	214	Tom Walters	S	Mississippi
17	227	Ozzie Clay	WR	Iowa State
18	242	Bob Jones	G	Nebraska
19	255	John Seedborg	P	Arizona State
20	270	Gordon Guest	RB	Arkansas

=== 1965 draft ===
Round	Pick	Player	Position	College
2	21	Bob Breitenstein	OT	Tulsa
3	34	Kent McCloughan	CB	Nebraska
8	105	Don Croftcheck	G	Indiana
9	118	Jerry Smith	TE	Arizona State
10	133	Bob Briggs	FB	Central State (OK)
11	146	Willie Adams	DE	New Mexico State
12	160	John Strohmeyer	OT	Michigan
13	174	Biff Bracy	HB	Duke
14	189	Dave Estrada	HB	Arizona State
15	202	Ben Baldwin	RB	Vanderbilt
16	217	Bob Reed	G	Tennessee A&I
17	230	Gary Hart	E	Vanderbilt
18	245	Chris Hanburger	LB	North Carolina
19	258	Roosevelt Ellerbe	RB	Iowa State

=== 1966 draft ===
Round	Pick	Player	Position	College
1	6	Charlie Gogolak	K	Princeton
2	21	Walt Barnes	DT	Nebraska
3	38	Tom Barrington	RB	Ohio State
4	53	Billy Clay	DB	Mississippi
5	70	Dick LeMay	OT	Vanderbilt
6	94	Earl Yates	OT	Duke
7	101	George Patton	OT	Georgia
8	115	Stan Mitchell	RB	Tennessee
9	131	Jack Shinholser	LB	Florida State
10	145	Caesar Belser	DB	Arkansas AM&N^{[j]}
11	161	Dick Reding	WR	Northwestern State
12	175	John Stipech	LB	Utah
13	191	Heath Wingate	C	Bowling Green
14	205	Jerry Lovelace	HB	Texas Tech
15	221	Hal Seymour	HB	Florida
16	235	Hal Wantland	DB	Tennessee
17	251	Mitch Zalnasky	E	Pittsburgh
18	265	Joe Burson	HB	Georgia
19	281	Andre White	TE	Florida A&M
20	295	John Kelly	T	Florida A&M

=== 1967 draft ===
Round	Pick	Player	Position	College
1	13	Ray McDonald	RB	Idaho
2	38	Spain Musgrove	DE	Utah State
3	64	Curg Belcher	DB	Brigham Young
6	135	Don Bandy	G	Tulsa
7	168	Bruce Matte	QB	Miami (Ohio)
7	172	John Love	WR	North Texas State^{[c]}
8	190	Larry Hendershot	LB	Arizona State
9	222	Pete Larson	RB	Cornell
10	247	Tim Houlton	DT	St. Norbert
10	250	Bruce Sullivan	DB	Illinois
11	275	Bill Brown	C	Texas-El Paso
12	300	Ron Sepic	E	Ohio State
13	328	Bob Rodwell	LB	Eastern Michigan
14	353	Andy Socha	HB	Marshall
15	378	Ed Breding	LB	Texas A&M
16	406	Alfredo Avila	DB	Sul Ross
17	431	Lyle Baucom	OT	San Francisco State

=== 1968 draft ===
Round	Pick	Player	Position	College
1	12	Jim Smith	DB	Oregon
2	38	Tom Roussel	LB	Southern Mississippi
4	94	Dennis Crane	DT	Southern California
5	113	Ken Barefoot	TE	Virginia Tech
5	117	Mike Bragg	P	Richmond
6	149	Willie Banks	G	Alcorn State
7	176	Bob Brunet	RB	Louisiana State
8	203	Brian Magnuson	RB	Montana
9	230	Frank Liberatore	DB	Clemson
11	284	Tom Garretson	DB	Northwestern
12	311	Dave Weedman	DT	Western Washington
13	338	Mike St. Louis	OT	Central Missouri
14	365	Dave Zivich	OT	Cal-Santa Barbara^{[l]}
15	392	Coger Coverson	G	Texas Southern
16	419	Willie Turner	RB	Jackson State
17	446	Frank Bosch	DT	Colorado

=== 1969 draft ===
Round	Pick	Player	Position	College
2	46	Eugene Epps	DB	Texas-El Paso
3	62	Ed Cross	RB	Arkansas AM&N^{[j]}
5	114	Bill Kishman	DB	Colorado State
6	139	Harold McLinton	LB	Southern
7	166	Jeff Anderson	RB	Virginia
7	173	John Didion	C	Oregon State
8	191	Larry Brown	RB	Kansas State
11	269	Eric Norri	DT	Notre Dame
12	295	Bob Shannon	DB	Tennessee State
13	322	Mike Shook	DB	North Texas State^{[c]}
14	347	Rick Brand	DT	Virginia
15	374	Paul Rogers	OT	Virginia
16	399	Mike Washington	LB	Southern
17	426	Rich Dobbert	DE	Springfield

== 1970s ==
=== 1970 draft ===
Round	Pick	Player	Position	College
2	43	Bill Brundige	DT	Colorado
4	103	Paul Laaveg	G	Iowa
5	114	Manny Sistrunk	DT	Arkansas A&M
5	121	Danny Pierce	RB	Memphis State^{[f]}
7	173	Roland Merritt	WR	Maryland
7	178	Jimmy Harris	CB	Howard Payne
8	200	Paul Johnson	DB	Penn State
9	225	Ralph Sonntag	OT	Maryland
11	277	Mack Alston	TE	Maryland Eastern Shore^{[o]}
12	303	Jim Kates	LB	Penn State
13	329	Joe Patterson	OT	Lawrence
14	355	Tony Moro	RB	Dayton
15	381	Vic Lewandowsky	C	Holy Cross
16	407	Steve Bushore	WR	Emporia State
17	433	Earl Maxfield	DT	Baylor

=== 1971 draft ===
Round	Pick	Player	Position	College
2	38	Cotton Speyrer	WR	Texas
6	141	Conway Hayman	G	Delaware
7	166	Willie Germany	DB	Morgan State
9	219	Mike Fanucci	DE	Arizona State
10	244	Jesse Taylor	RB	Cincinnati
11	272	George Starke	OT	Columbia
12	297	Jeff Severson	DB	Long Beach State
13	322	Dan Ryczek	C	Virginia
14	349	Bill Bynum	QB	Western New Mexico
15	375	Tony Christnovich	G	Wisconsin–La Crosse
16	400	Glenn Tucker	LB	North Texas State^{[c]}

=== 1972 draft ===
Round	Pick	Player	Position	College
8	203	Moses Denson	RB	Maryland Eastern Shore^{[o]}
9	229	Steve Boekholder	DE	Drake
10	255	Mike Oldham	WR	Michigan
11	281	Jeff Welch	DB	Arkansas State
12	307	Don Bunce	QB	Stanford
13	332	Frank Grant	WR	Southern Colorado
15	365	Mike O'Quinn	G	McNeese State
15	385	Carl Taibi	DE	Colorado
16	411	Steve Higginbotham	DB	Alabama
17	437	Kevin Clemente	LB	Boston College

=== 1973 draft ===
Round	Pick	Player	Position	College
5	117	Charles Cantrell	G	Lamar
8	193	Mike Hancock	TE	Idaho State
9	218	Rich Galbos	RB	Ohio State
9	233	Eddie Sheats	LB	Kansas
10	245	Ken Stone	DB	Vanderbilt
12	311	Ernie Webster	G	Pittsburgh
13	337	Dennis Johnson	DE	Delaware
14	363	Herb Marshall	DB	Cameron^{[m]}
16	415	Mike Wedman	K	Colorado
17	441	Jeff Davis	RB	Mars Hill

=== 1974 draft ===
Round	Pick	Player	Position	College
6	144	Jon Keyworth	RB	Colorado
7	180	Mike Varty	LB	Northwestern
8	196	Darwin Robinson	RB	Dakota State
9	218	Mark Sens	DE	Colorado
9	228	Mike Flater	K	Colo. School of Mines
9	233	Jim Kennedy	TE	Colorado State
10	258	Johnny Vann	DB	South Dakota
11	282	Joe Miller	OT	Villanova
13	332	Stu O'Dell	LB	Indiana
14	361	Don Van Galder	QB	Utah
16	411	Nate Anderson	RB	Eastern Illinois

=== 1975 draft ===
Round	Pick	Player	Position	College
5	108	Mike Thomas	RB	Nevada-Las Vegas
6	147	Mark Doak	OT	Nebraska
9	228	Dallas Hickman	DE	California
11	277	Ardell Johnson	DB	Nebraska
11	282	Jerry Hackenbruck	DE	Oregon State
14	344	Morris McKie	DB	North Carolina State
14	359	Dave Benson	LB	Weber State
15	384	Art Kuehn	C	UCLA
16	412	Dennis Pavelka	G	Nebraska
17	437	Carl Taylor	DE	Memphis State^{[f]}

=== 1976 draft ===
Round	Pick	Player	Position	College
5	148	Mike Hughes	G	Baylor
6	179	Tom Marvaso	DB	Cincinnati
8	234	Brian Fryer	WR	Alberta
9	254	Curtis Akins	G	Hawaii
10	272	Paul Strohmeier	LB	Washington
11	308	Dean Gissler	DE	Nebraska
12	342	Walter Tullis	WR	Delaware State
13	364	Wayman Britt	DB	Michigan
14	393	Quinn Buckner	DB	Indiana
15	426	John Monroe	RB	Bluefield State
17	476	Chuck Willis	DB	Oregon

=== 1977 draft ===
Round	Pick	Player	Position	College
4	97	Duncan McColl	DE	Stanford
7	189	Reggie Haynes	TE	Nevada-Las Vegas
9	246	Mike Northington	RB	Purdue
10	273	James Sykes	RB	Rice
11	300	Don Harris	DB	Rutgers
12	327	Curtis Kirkland	DE	Missouri

=== 1978 draft ===
Round	Pick	Player	Position	College
6	159	Tony Green	RB	Florida
8	202	Walker Lee	WR	North Carolina
8	219	Don Hover	LB	Washington State
9	243	John Hurley	QB	Santa Clara^{[d]}
10	270	Scott Hertenstein	DE	Azusa Pacific
11	297	Mike Williams	DB	Texas A&M
12	324	Steve McCabe	G	Bowdoin

=== 1979 draft ===
Round	Pick	Player	Position	College
4	103	Don Warren	TE	San Diego State
7	182	Rich Milot	LB	Penn State
9	233	Kris Haines	WR	Notre Dame
11	289	Monte Coleman	LB	Central Arkansas
11	300	Tony Hall	WR	Knoxville

== 1980s ==
=== 1980 draft ===
Round	Pick	Player	Position	College
1	18	Art Monk	WR	Syracuse
2	55	Mat Mendenhall	DE	Brigham Young
6	155	Farley Bell	LB	Cincinnati
7	187	Melvin Jones	G	Houston
9	241	Lawrence McCullough	WR	Illinois
10	268	Lewis Walker	RB	Utah
11	295	Mike Matocha	DE	Texas-Arlington
12	327	Marcene Emmett	DB	North Alabama

=== 1981 draft ===
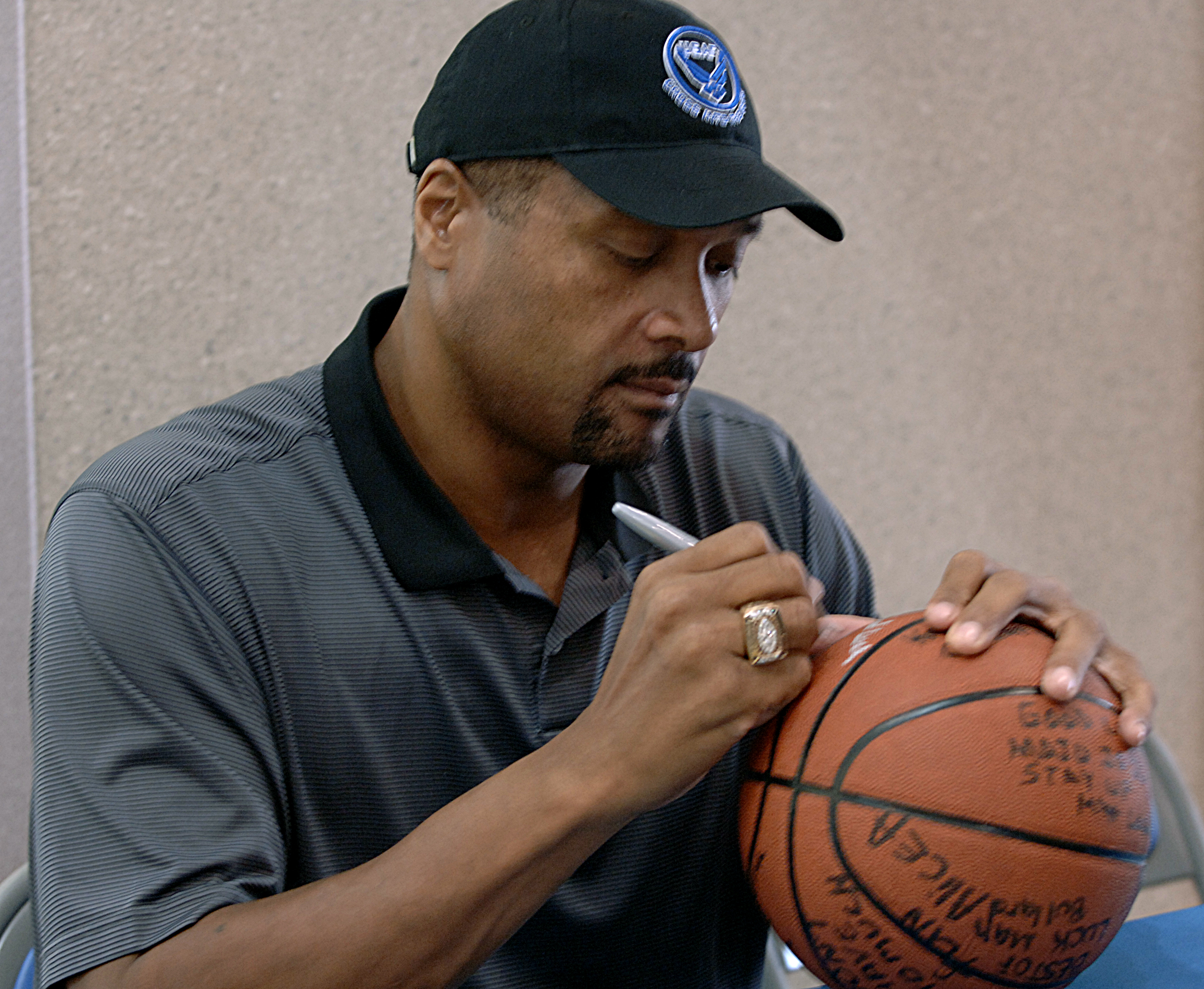
Mark May was drafted in the first round of the 1981 draft.

Round	Pick	Player	Position	College
1	20	Mark May	OT	Pittsburgh
3	69	Russ Grimm	G	Pittsburgh
4	90	Tom Flick	QB	Washington
5	119	Dexter Manley	DE	Oklahoma State
5	132	Gary Sayre	G	Cameron^{[m]}
6	148	Larry Kubin	LB	Penn State
8	201	Charlie Brown	WR	South Carolina State
9	231	Darryl Grant	DT	Rice
10	257	Phil Kessel	QB	Northern Michigan
10	267	Allan Kennedy	OT	Washington State
11	284	Jerry Hill	WR	North Alabama
12	314	Clint Didier	TE	Portland State

=== 1982 draft ===
Round	Pick	Player	Position	College
2	49	Vernon Dean	CB	San Diego State
3	61	Carl Powell	WR	Jackson State
4	99	Todd Liebenstein	DE	Nevada-Las Vegas
5	133	Mike Williams	TE	Alabama A&M
6	153	Lamont Jeffers	LB	Tennessee
7	180	John Schachtner	LB	Northern Arizona
8	223	Ralph Warthen	DT	Gardner–Webb
9	226	Ken Coffey	DB	Southwest Texas State^{[r]}
9	238	Randy Trautman	DT	Boise State
10	254	Harold Smith	DE	Kentucky State
10	265	Terry Daniels	DB	Tennessee
11	281	Dan Miller	K	Miami (FL)
11	291	Bob Holly	QB	Princeton
12	309	Donald Laster	OT	Tennessee State
12	322	Jeff Goff	LB	Arkansas

=== 1983 draft ===
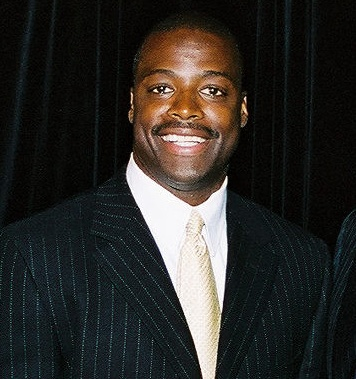
Darrell Green, a first-round draft pick in 1983, was inducted into the Hall of Fame in 2008.

Round	Pick	Player	Position	College
1	28	Darrell Green	CB	Texas A&I
2	56	Richard Williams	RB	Memphis State^{[f]}
3	84	Charles Mann	DE	Nevada
6	166	Bob Winckler	OT	Wisconsin
6	168	Babe Laufenberg	QB	Indiana
7	196	Kelvin Bryant	RB	North Carolina
8	224	Todd Hallstrom	OT	Minnesota
9	251	Marcus Gilbert	RB	Texas Christian
10	279	Geff Gandy	LB	Baylor

=== 1984 draft ===
Round	Pick	Player	Position	College
2	31	Bob Slater	DT	Oklahoma
2	55	Steve Hamilton	DE	East Carolina
3	83	Jay Schroeder	QB	UCLA
4	102	Jimmy Smith	RB	Elon
5	125	Jeff Pegues	LB	East Carolina
6	167	Curt Singer	OT	Tennessee
7	195	Mark Smith	WR	North Carolina
8	223	Jeff Smith	DB	Missouri
10	279	Keith Griffin	RB	Miami (FL)
11	306	Anthony Jones	TE	Wichita State
12	335	Curtland Thomas	WR	Missouri

=== 1984 supplemental draft ===
The supplemental draft gave NFL teams the league rights to the players who had been eligible to be drafted but were not because they were under contract with teams in the United States Football League or the Canadian Football League.

Round	Pick	Player	Position	College	USFL Team
1	27	Tony Zendejas	K	Nevada-Reno	Los Angeles Express
2	55	Gary Clark	WR	James Madison	Jacksonville Bulls
3	83	Clarence Verdin	WR	Southwestern Louisiana^{[s]}	Houston Gamblers

=== 1985 draft ===
Round	Pick	Player	Position	College
2	33	Tory Nixon	DB	San Diego State
5	122	Raphel Cherry	DB	Hawaii
6	163	Danzell Lee	TE	Lamar
7	177	Jamie Harris	KR	Oklahoma State
7	185	Lionel Vital	RB	Nicholls State
8	219	Barry Wilburn	CB	Mississippi
9	247	Mitch Geier	G	Troy State^{[u]}
10	263	Terry Orr	TE	Texas
11	290	Raleigh McKenzie	G	Tennessee
11	304	Garry Kimble	DB	Sam Houston State
12	309	Dean Hamel	DT	Tulsa
12	331	Bryan Winn	LB	Houston

=== 1986 draft ===
Round	Pick	Player	Position	College
2	30	Markus Koch	DE	Boise State
2	45	Walter Murray	WR	Hawaii
3	75	Alvin Walton	DB	Kansas
5	113	Ravin Caldwell	LB	Arkansas
6	146	Mark Rypien	QB	Washington State
6	156	Jim Huddleston	G	Virginia
7	186	Rick Badanjek	RB	Maryland
8	213	Kurt Gouveia	LB	Brigham Young
9	239	Wayne Asberry	DB	Texas A&M
11	297	Kenny Fells	RB	Henderson State
12	323	Eric Yarber	WR	Idaho

=== 1987 draft ===
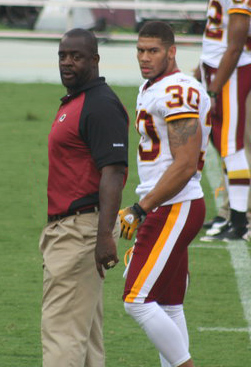
Clarence Vaughn was drafted in the eighth round of the 1987 draft.

Round	Pick	Player	Position	College
2	30	Brian Davis	DB	Nebraska
2	48	Wally Kleine	OT	Notre Dame
5	117	Timmy Smith	RB	Texas Tech
6	144	Steve Gage	DB	Tulsa
6	164	Ed Simmons	OT	Eastern Washington
7	192	Johnny Thomas	DB	Baylor
8	219	Clarence Vaughn	DB	Northern Illinois
9	248	Alfred Jenkins	QB	Arizona
10	274	Ted Wilson	WR	Central Florida
11	304	Laron Brown	WR	Texas
12	331	Ray Hitchcock	C	Minnesota

=== 1988 draft ===
Round	Pick	Player	Position	College
2	55	Chip Lohmiller	K	Minnesota
3	66	Mike Oliphant	RB	Puget Sound
4	109	Jamie Morris	RB	Michigan
5	127	Carl Mims	DB	Sam Houston State
6	159	Stan Humphries	QB	Northeast Louisiana^{[q]}
7	193	Harold Hicks	DB	San Diego State
8	221	Darryl McGill	RB	Wake Forest
9	249	Blake Peterson	LB	Mesa
10	277	Henry Brown	OT	Ohio State
11	305	Curt Koch	DE	Colorado
12	315	Wayne Ross	P	San Diego State

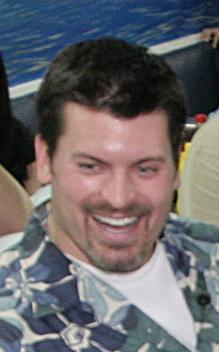
Mark Schlereth was drafted in the tenth round of the 1989 draft and won three Super Bowls in his career.

=== 1989 draft ===
Round	Pick	Player	Position	College
3	66	Tracy Rocker	DT	Auburn
4	110	Erik Affholter	WR	Southern California
5	129	Tim Smiley	DB	Arkansas State
5	139	Lybrant Robinson	DE	Delaware State
6	149	A. J. Johnson	DB	Southwest Texas State^{[r]}
7	179	Kevin Hendrix	LB	South Carolina
9	233	Charles Darrington	TE	Kentucky
10	263	Mark Schlereth	C	Idaho
12	316	Jimmie Johnson	TE	Howard
12	317	Joe Mickles	RB	Mississippi

== 1990s ==
=== 1990 draft ===
Round	Pick	Player	Position	College
2	46	Andre Collins	LB	Penn State
3	76	Mohammed Elewonibi	G	Brigham Young
4	86	Cary Conklin	QB	Washington
4	109	Rico Labbe	DB	Boston College
5	130	Brian Mitchell	RB	Southwestern Louisiana^{[s]}
6	160	Kent Walls	DT	Nebraska
9	243	Tim Moxley	G	Ohio State
10	262	D'Juan Francisco	DB	North Dakota
10	270	Thomas Rayam	DT	Alabama
11	297	Jon Leverenz	LB	Minnesota

=== 1991 draft ===
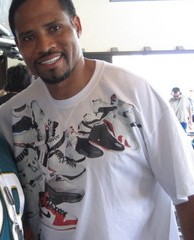
Keenan McCardell was drafted in the twelfth round of the 1991 draft and rejoined the team in 2007.

Round	Pick	Player	Position	College
1	17	Bobby Wilson	DT	Michigan State
3	76	Ricky Ervins	RB	Southern California
6	159	Dennis Ransom	TE	Texas A&M
7	188	Keith Cash	TE	Texas
8	215	Jimmy Spencer	DB	Florida
9	243	Charles Bell	DB	Baylor
10	270	Cris Shale	P	Bowling Green
11	299	David Gulledge	S	Jacksonville State
12	326	Keenan McCardell	WR	Nevada-Las Vegas

=== 1992 draft ===
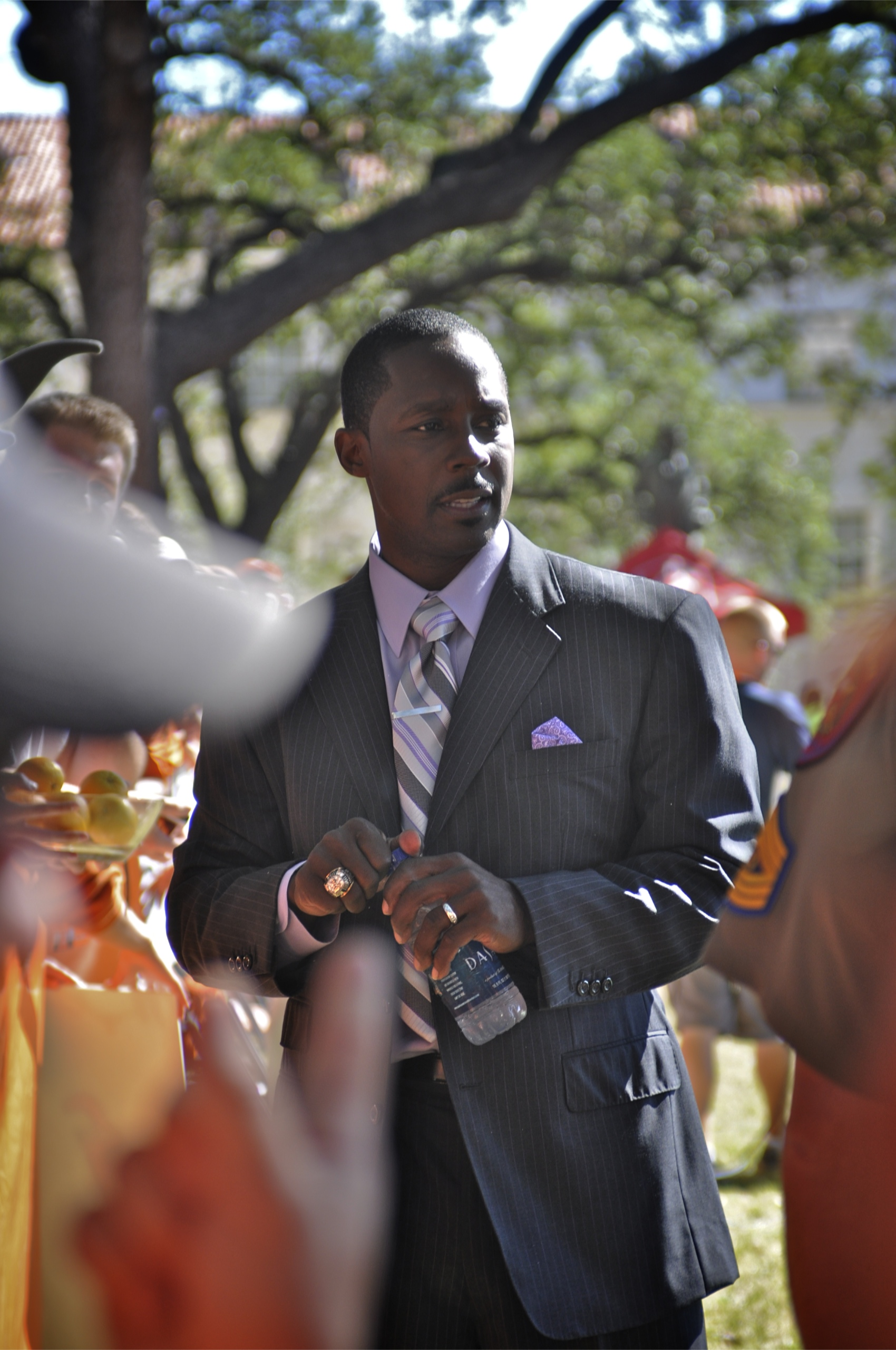
Desmond Howard was drafted in the first round of the 1992 draft.

Round	Pick	Player	Position	College
1	4	Desmond Howard	WR	Michigan
2	47	Shane Collins	DE	Arizona State
3	74	Paul Siever	G	Penn State
4	112	Chris Hakel	QB	William & Mary
6	168	Ray Rowe	TE	San Diego State
7	196	Calvin Holmes	DB	Southern California
8	224	Darryl Moore	G	Texas-El Paso
9	252	Boone Powell	LB	Texas
10	280	Tony Barker	LB	Rice
11	308	Terry Smith	WR	Penn State
12	336	Matt Elliott	C	Michigan

=== 1993 draft ===
Round	Pick	Player	Position	College
1	17	Tom Carter	CB	Notre Dame
2	45	Reggie Brooks	RB	Notre Dame
3	71	Rick Hamilton	LB	Central Florida
3	80	Ed Bunn	P	Texas-El Paso
4	101	Sterling Palmer	DE	Florida State
5	128	Greg Huntington	C	Penn State
6	155	Darryl Morrison	CB	Arizona
6	160	Frank Wycheck	TE	Maryland
8	212	Lamont Hollinquest	LB	Southern California

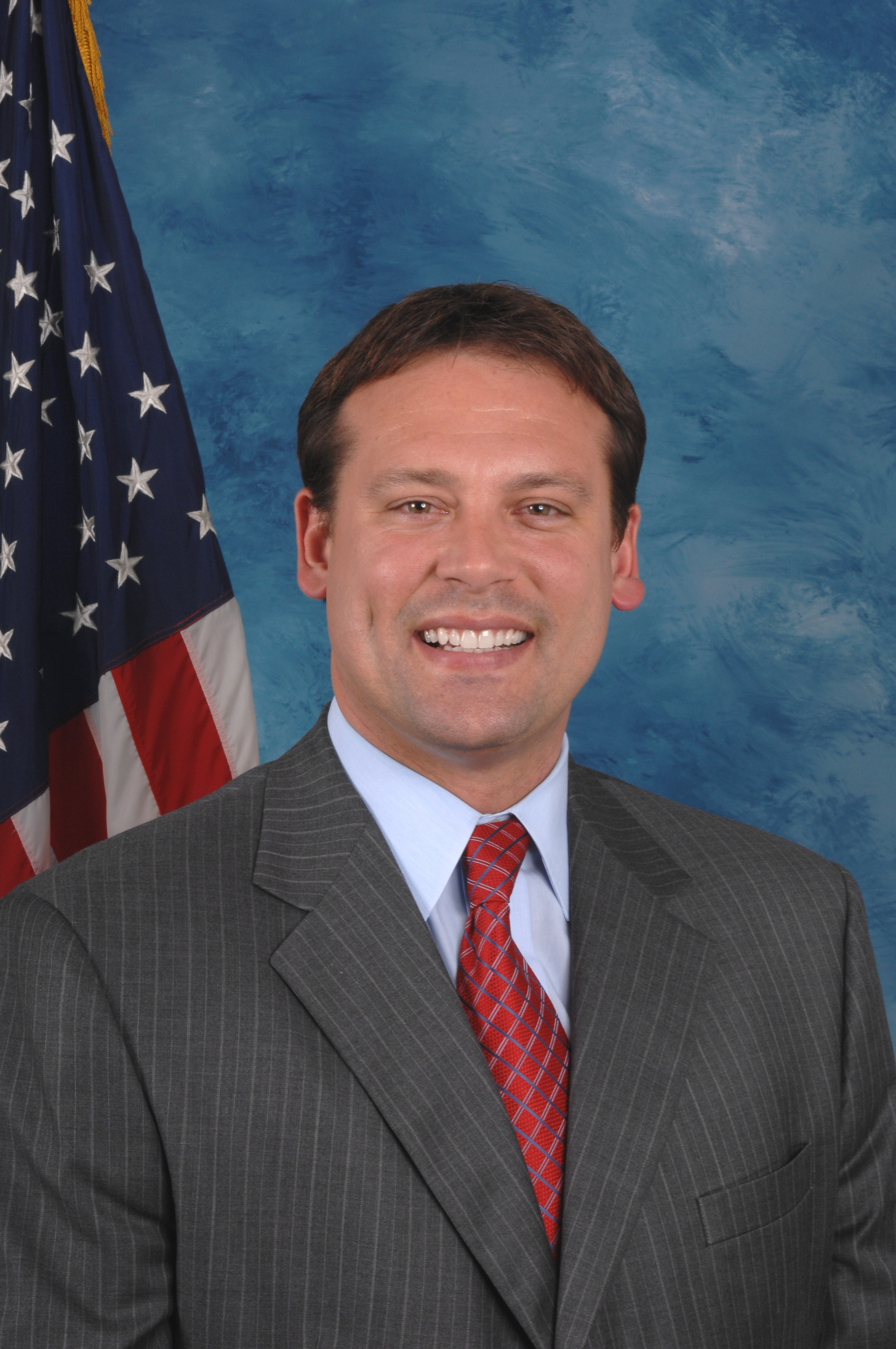
Heath Shuler, drafted in the first round of the 1994 draft, is now an American politician in the United States House of Representatives.

=== 1994 draft ===
Round	Pick	Player	Position	College
1	3	Heath Shuler	QB	Tennessee
2	31	Tre' Johnson	G	Temple
3	68	Tydus Winans	WR	Fresno State
3	97	Joe Patton	OT	Alabama A&M
4	105	Kurt Haws	TE	Utah
6	163	Dexter Nottage	DE	Florida A&M
7	197	Gus Frerotte	QB	Tulsa

=== 1995 draft ===
Round	Pick	Player	Position	College
1	4	Michael Westbrook	WR	Colorado
2	37	Cory Raymer	C	Wisconsin
3	68	Darryl Pounds	CB	Nicholls State
4	103	Larry Jones	RB	Miami (FL)
5	137	Jamie Asher	TE	Louisville
5	152	Rich Owens	DE	Lehigh
6	176	Brian Thure	OT	California
7	226	Scott Turner	CB	Illinois

=== 1996 draft ===
Round	Pick	Player	Position	College
1	30	Andre Johnson	OT	Penn State
4	102	Stephen Davis	RB	Auburn
5	138	Leomont Evans	S	Clemson
6	174	Kelvin Kinney	DE	Virginia State
7	215	Jeremy Asher	LB	Oregon
7	250	DeAndre Maxwell	WR	San Diego State

=== 1997 draft ===
Round	Pick	Player	Position	College
1	17	Kenard Lang	DE	Miami (FL)
2	51	Greg Jones	LB	Colorado
3	80	Derek Smith	LB	Arizona State
4	115	Albert Connell	WR	Texas A&M
5	132	Jamel Williams	S	Nebraska
5	140	Keith Thibodeaux	CB	Northwestern State
5	148	Twan Russell	LB	Miami (FL)
5	162	Brad Badger	G	Stanford

=== 1998 draft ===
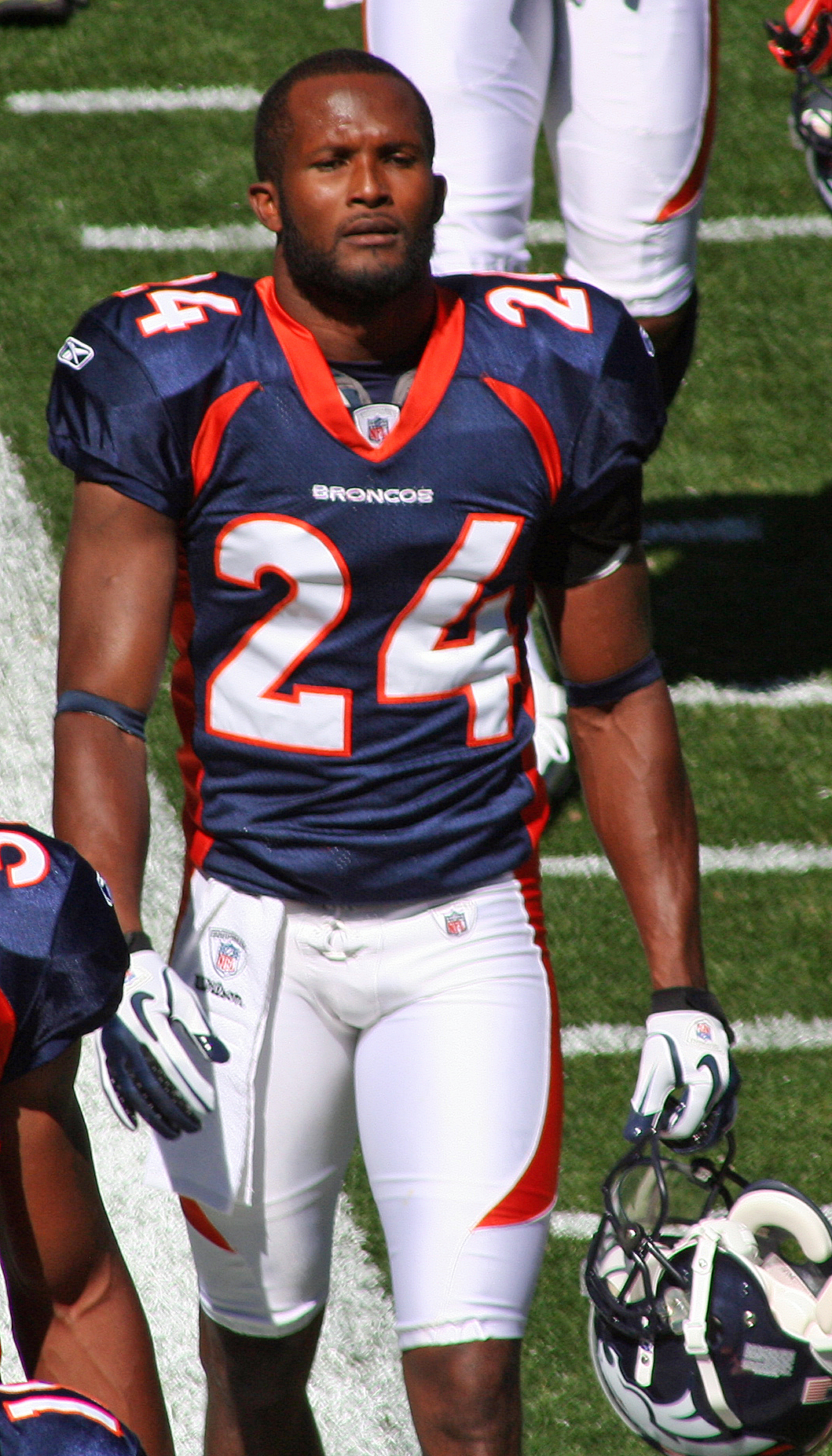
Champ Bailey was drafted in the first round of the 1999 draft.

Round	Pick	Player	Position	College
2	48	Stephen Alexander	TE	Oklahoma
3	69	Skip Hicks	RB	UCLA
4	113	Shawn Barber	LB	Richmond
5	140	Mark Fischer	C	Purdue
6	170	Pat Palmer	WR	Northwestern State
7	191	David Terrell	CB	Texas-El Paso
7	206	Antwaune Ponds	LB	Syracuse

=== 1999 draft ===
Round	Pick	Player	Position	College
1	7	Champ Bailey	CB	Georgia
2	37	Jon Jansen	OT	Michigan
4	107	Nate Stimson	LB	Georgia Tech
5	165	Derek Smith	OT	Virginia Tech
6	181	Jeff Hall	K	Tennessee
7	217	Tim Alexander	WR	Oregon State

== 2000s ==
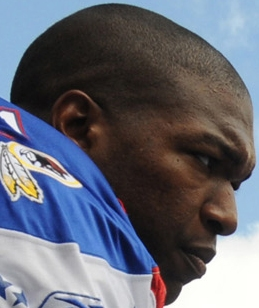
Chris Samuels was drafted third overall in the 2000 draft.

=== 2000 draft ===
Round	Pick	Player	Position	College
1	2	LaVar Arrington	LB	Penn State
1	3	Chris Samuels	OT	Alabama
3	64	Lloyd Harrison	CB	North Carolina State
4	129	Michael Moore	G	Troy State^{[u]}
5	155	Quincy Sanders	S	Nevada-Las Vegas
6	202	Todd Husak	QB	Stanford
7	216	Delbert Cowsette	DT	Maryland
7	250	Ethan Howell	WR	Oklahoma State

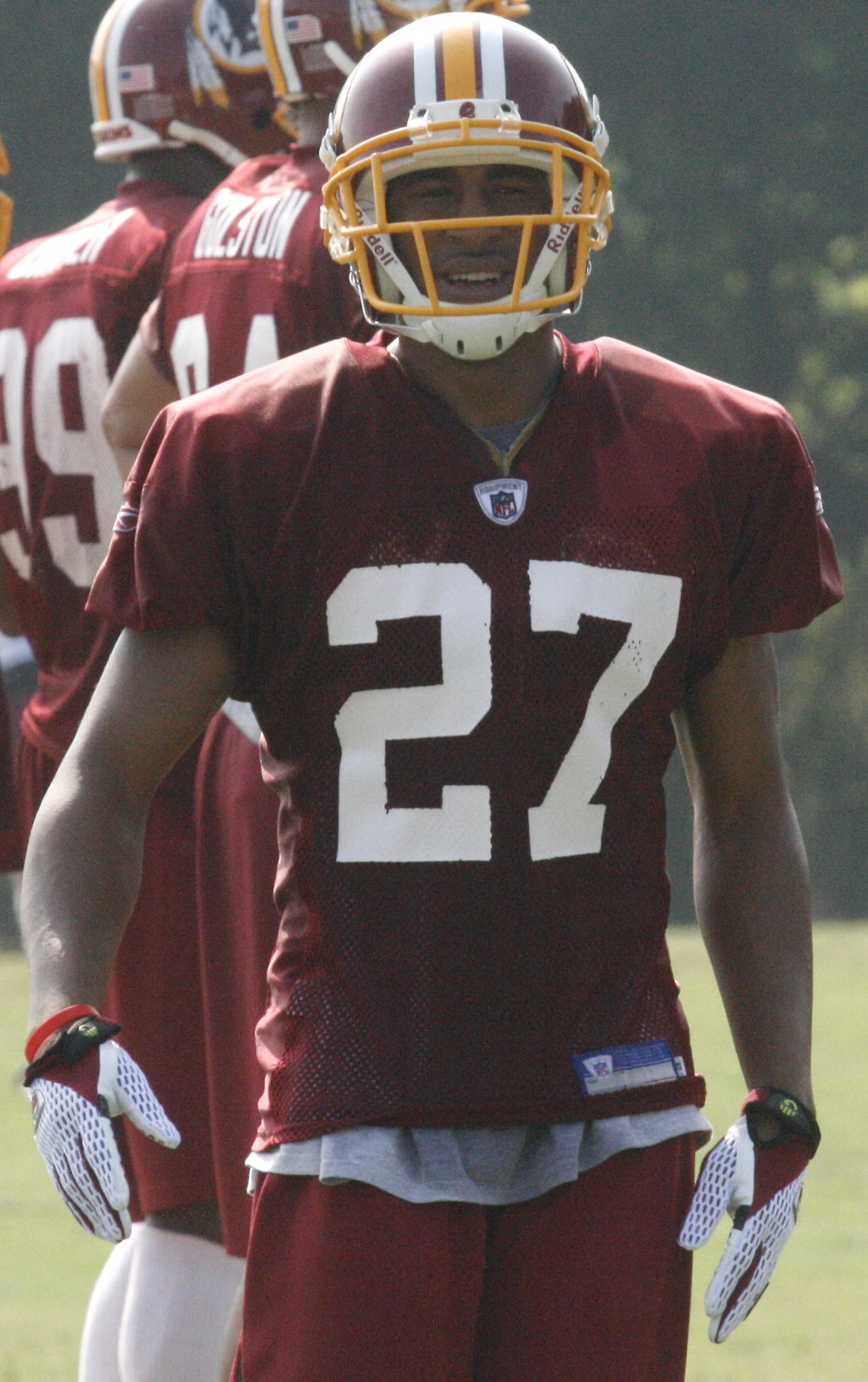
Fred Smoot was drafted in the second round of the 2001 draft.

=== 2001 draft ===
Round	Pick	Player	Position	College
1	15	Rod Gardner	WR	Clemson
2	45	Fred Smoot	CB	Mississippi State
4	109	Sage Rosenfels	QB	Iowa State
5	154	Darnerien McCants	WR	Delaware State
6	186	Mario Monds	DT	Cincinnati

=== 2002 draft ===
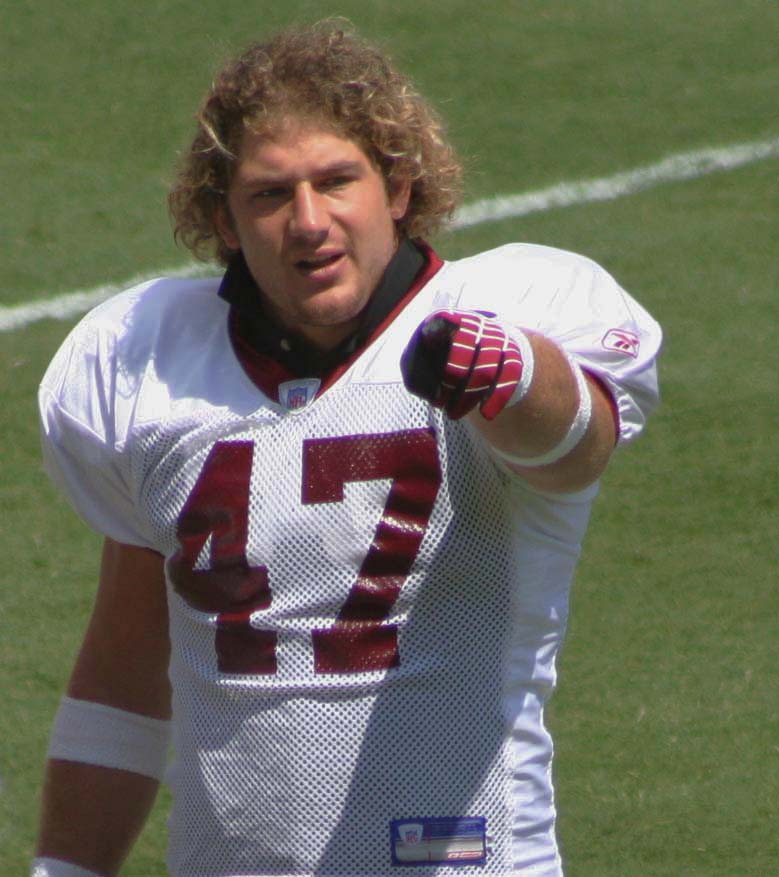
Chris Cooley was drafted in the third round of the 2004 draft.

Round	Pick	Player	Position	College
1	32	Patrick Ramsey	QB	Tulane
2	56	Ladell Betts	RB	Iowa
3	79	Rashad Bauman	CB	Oregon
3	87	Cliff Russell	WR	Utah
5	159	Andre Lott	S	Tennessee
5	160	Robert Royal	TE	Louisiana State
6	192	Reggie Coleman	OT	Tennessee
7	230	Jeff Grau	LS	UCLA
7	234	Greg Scott	DE	Hampton
7	257	Rock Cartwright	FB	Kansas State

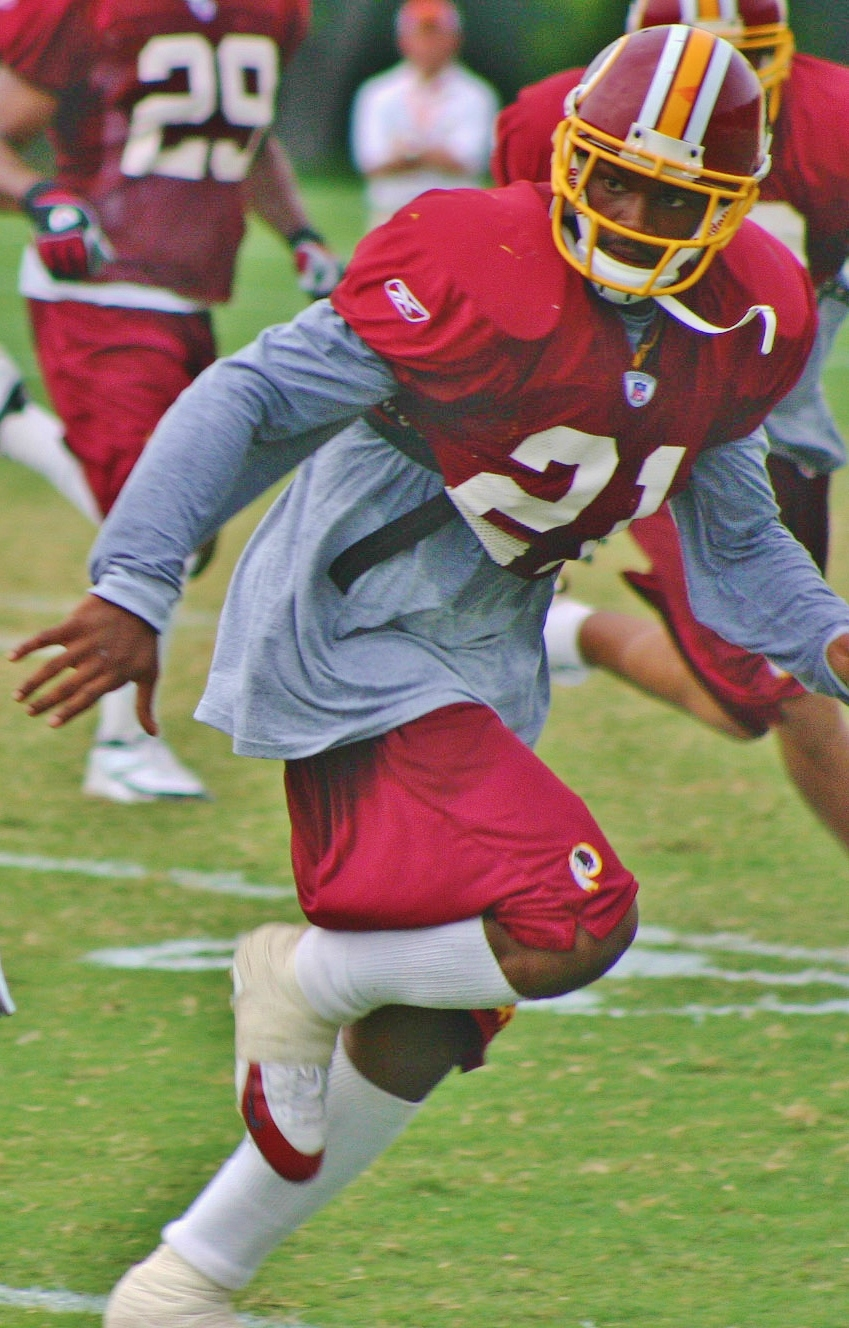
Sean Taylor, a first-round draft pick in 2004, played safety for the Redskins until he was fatally shot in November 2007.

=== 2003 draft ===
Round	Pick	Player	Position	College
2	44	Taylor Jacobs	WR	Florida
3	81	Derrick Dockery	G	Texas
7	232	Gibran Hamdan	QB	Indiana

=== 2004 draft ===
Round	Pick	Player	Position	College
1	5	Sean Taylor	S	Miami (FL)
3	81	Chris Cooley	TE	Utah State
5	151	Mark Wilson	OT	California
6	180	Jim Molinaro	OT	Notre Dame

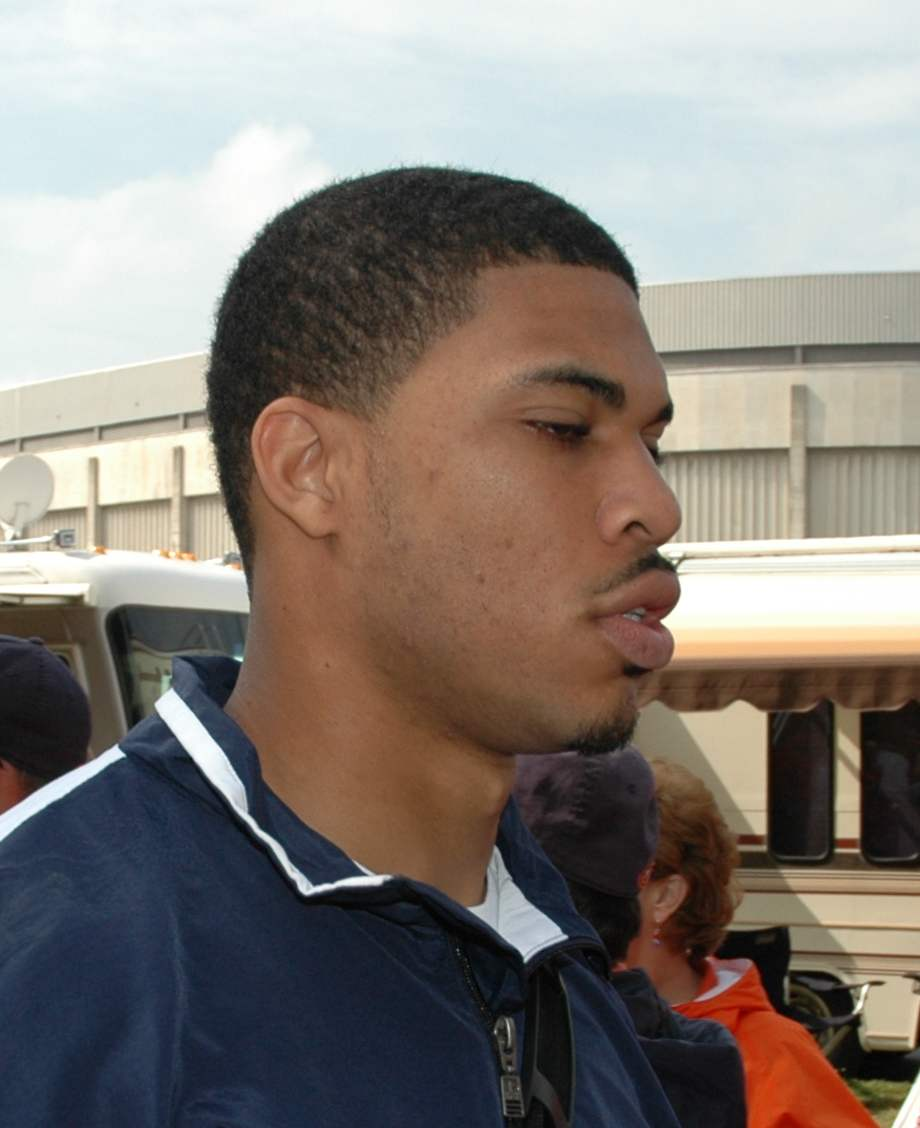
Jason Campbell was drafted in the first round of 2005 draft.

=== 2005 draft ===
Round	Pick	Player	Position	College
1	9	Carlos Rogers	CB	Auburn
1	25	Jason Campbell	QB	Auburn
4	120	Manuel White	FB	UCLA
5	154	Robert McCune	LB	Louisville
6	183	Jared Newberry	LB	Stanford
7	222	Nehemiah Broughton	FB	The Citadel

=== 2006 draft ===
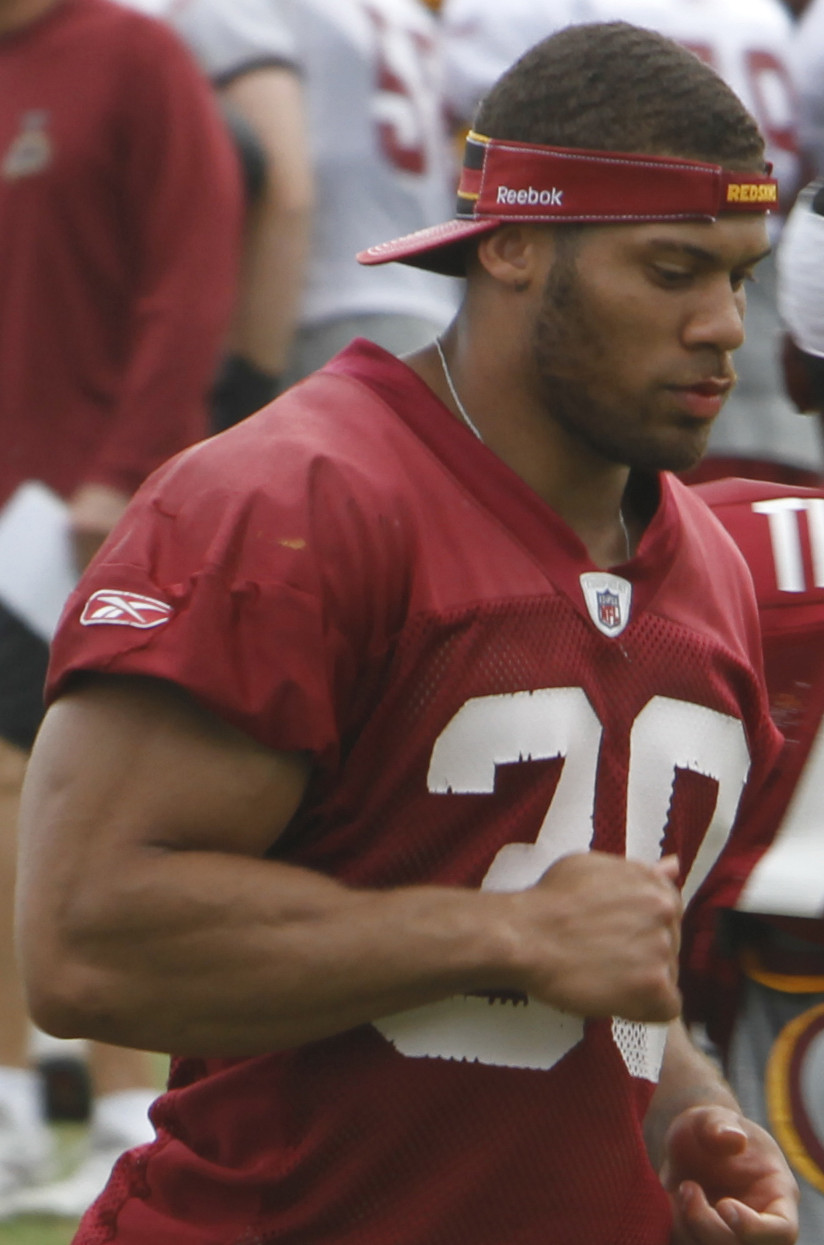
LaRon Landry was drafted sixth overall in the 2007 draft.

Round	Pick	Player	Position	College
2	35	Rocky McIntosh	LB	Miami (FL)
5	153	Anthony Montgomery	DT	Minnesota
6	173	Reed Doughty	S	Northern Colorado
6	196	Kedric Golston	DT	Georgia
7	230	Kili Lefotu	G	Arizona
7	250	Kevin Simon	LB	Tennessee

=== 2007 draft ===
Round	Pick	Player	Position	College
1	6	LaRon Landry	S	Louisiana State
5	143	Dallas Sartz	LB	Southern California
6	179	H. B. Blades	LB	Pittsburgh
6	205	Jordan Palmer	QB	Texas-El Paso
7	216	Tyler Ecker	TE	Michigan

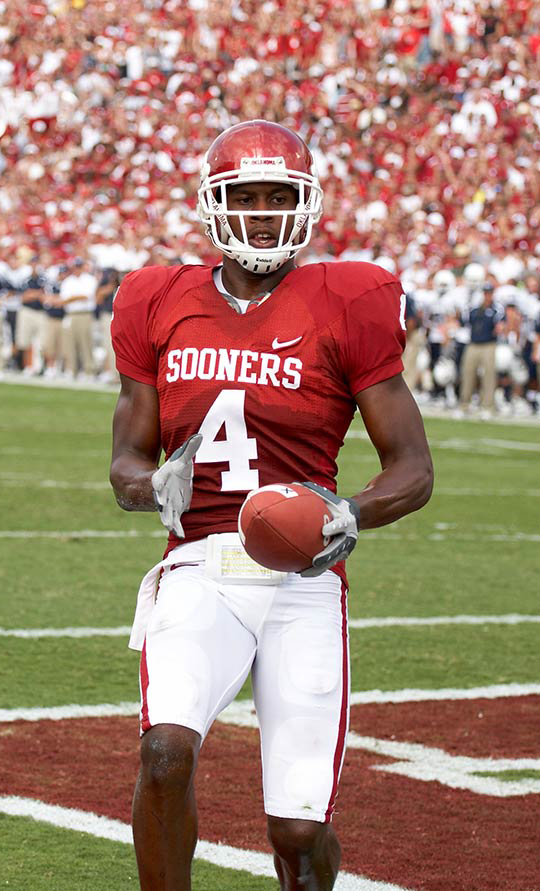
Malcolm Kelly was drafted in the second round of the 2008 draft.

=== 2008 draft ===
Round	Pick	Player	Position	College
2	34	Devin Thomas	WR	Michigan State
2	48	Fred Davis	TE	Southern California
2	51	Malcolm Kelly	WR	Oklahoma
3	96	Chad Rinehart	G	Northern Iowa
4	124	Justin Tryon	CB	Arizona State
6	168	Durant Brooks	P	Georgia Tech
6	180	Kareem Moore	S	Nicholls State
6	186	Colt Brennan	QB	Hawaii
7	242	Rob Jackson	DE	Kansas State
7	249	Chris Horton	S	UCLA

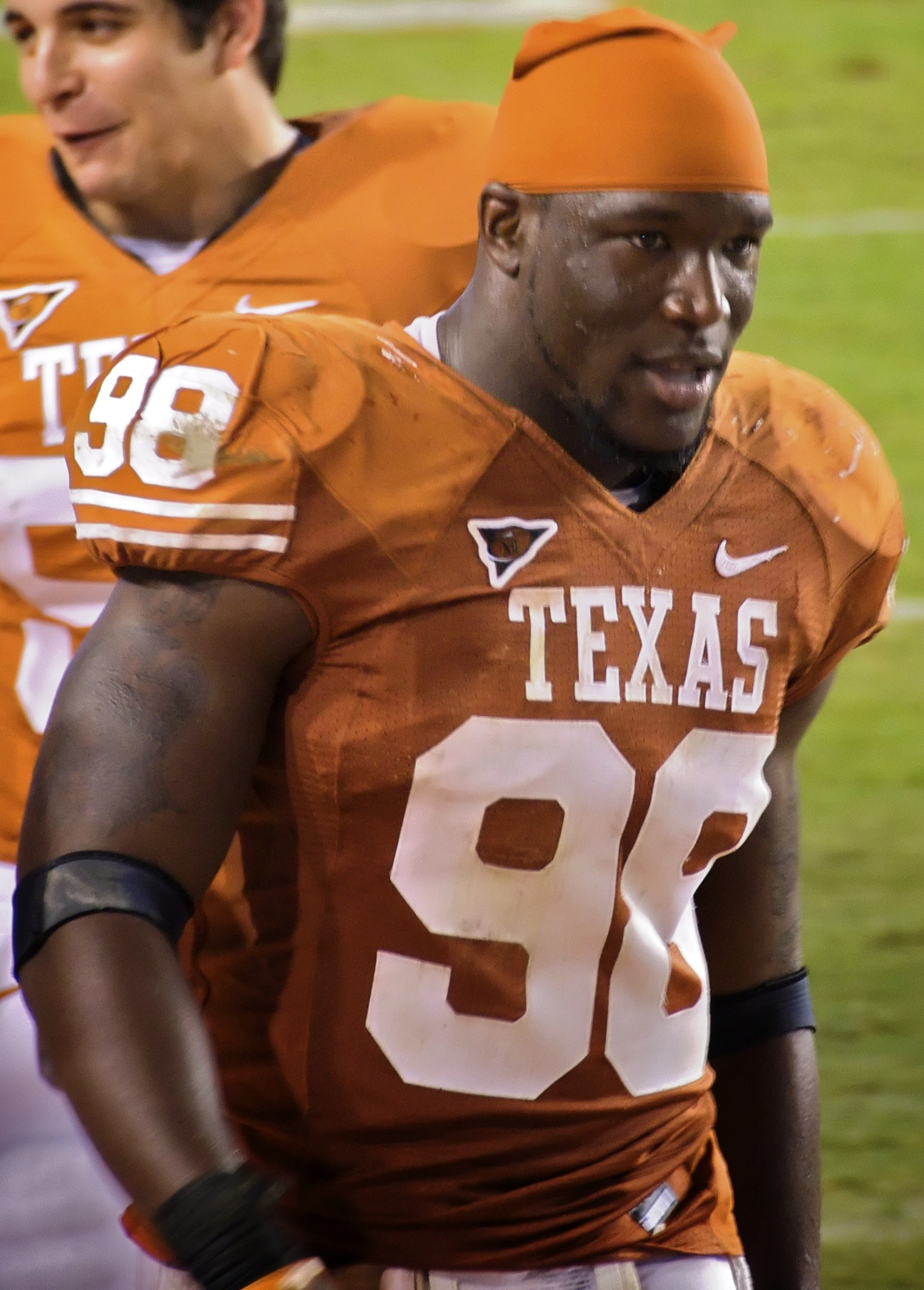
Brian Orakpo was drafted in the first round of the 2009 draft.

=== 2009 draft ===
Round	Pick	Player	Position	College
1	13	Brian Orakpo	DE	Texas
3	80	Kevin Barnes	CB	Maryland
5	158	Cody Glenn	LB	Nebraska
6	186	Robert Henson	LB	Texas Christian
7	221	Eddie Williams	TE	Idaho
7	243	Marko Mitchell	WR	Nevada

=== 2009 supplemental draft ===
For their selection in the supplemental draft, the Redskins forfeited its sixth round pick in the 2010 NFL draft.

Round	Player	Position	College
3	Jeremy Jarmon	DE	Kentucky

== 2010s ==
=== 2010 draft ===
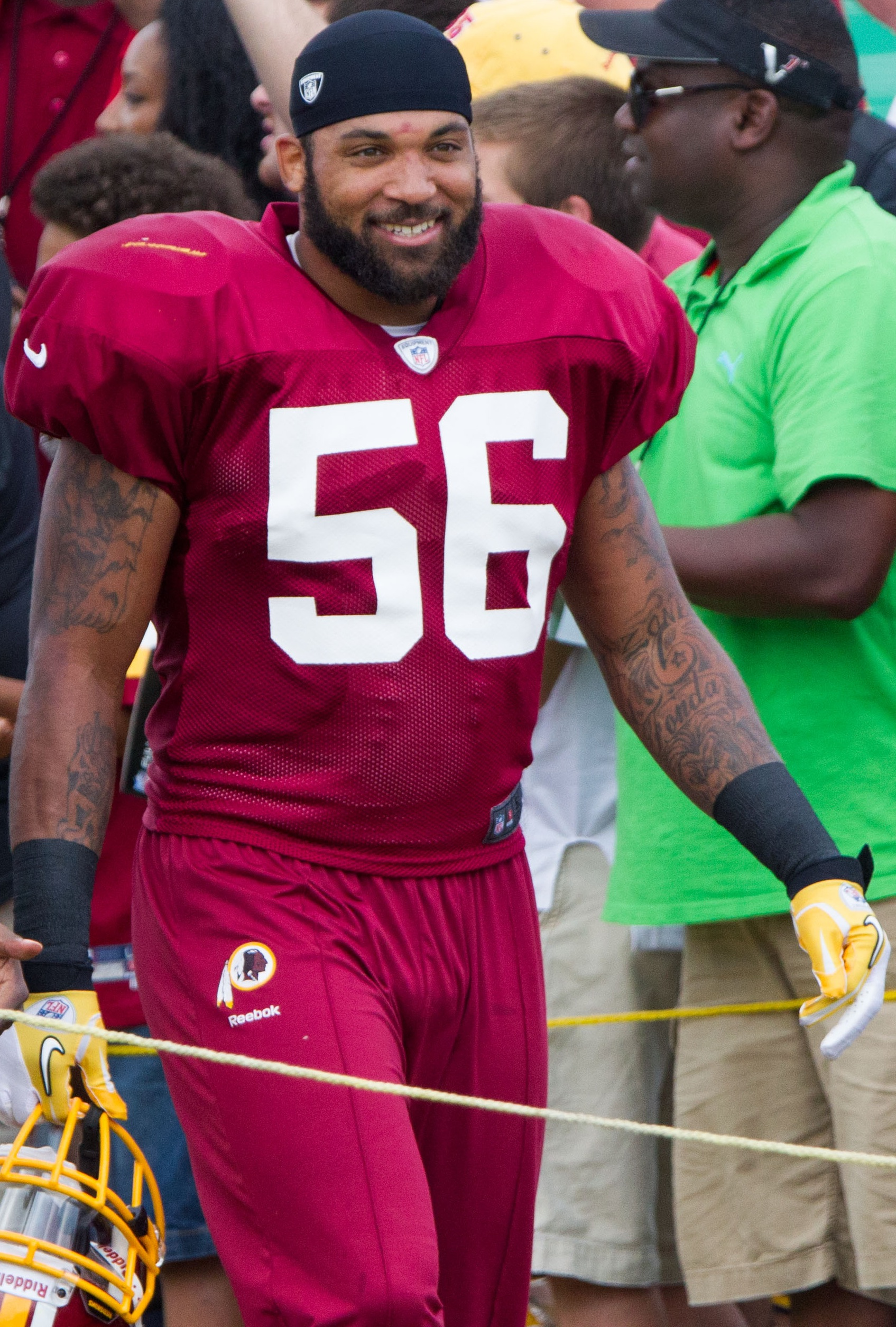
Perry Riley was drafted in the fourth round of the 2010 draft.

Round	Pick	Player	Position	College
1	4	Trent Williams	OT	Oklahoma
4	103	Perry Riley	LB	Louisiana State
6	174	Dennis Morris	TE	Louisiana Tech
7	219	Terrence Austin	WR	UCLA
7	229	Erik Cook	G	New Mexico
7	231	Selvish Capers	OT	West Virginia

=== 2011 draft ===
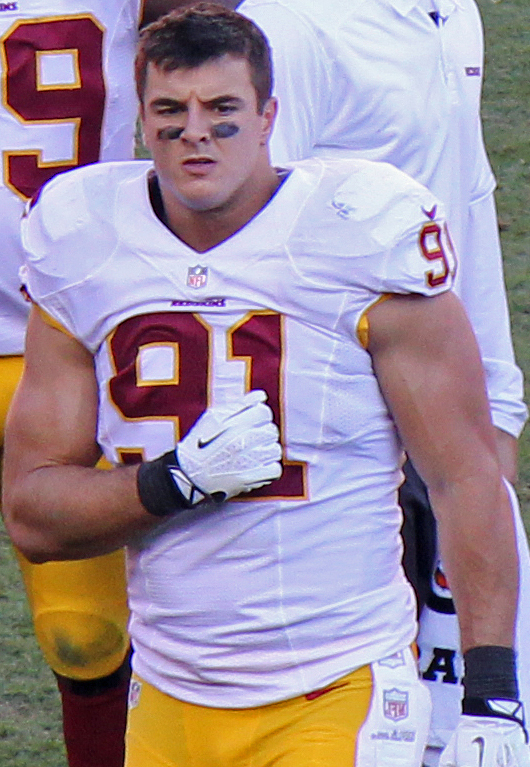
Ryan Kerrigan was drafted 16th overall in the 2011 draft.

Round	Pick	Player	Position	College
1	16	Ryan Kerrigan	DE	Purdue
2	41	Jarvis Jenkins	DT	Clemson
3	79	Leonard Hankerson	WR	Miami (FL)
4	105	Roy Helu	RB	Nebraska
5	146	DeJon Gomes	S	Nebraska
5	155	Niles Paul	WR	Nebraska
6	177	Evan Royster	RB	Penn State
6	178	Aldrick Robinson	WR	Southern Methodist
7	213	Brandyn Thompson	CB	Boise State
7	217	Maurice Hurt	OT	Florida
7	224	Markus White	DE	Florida State
7	253	Chris Neild	DT	West Virginia

=== 2012 draft ===
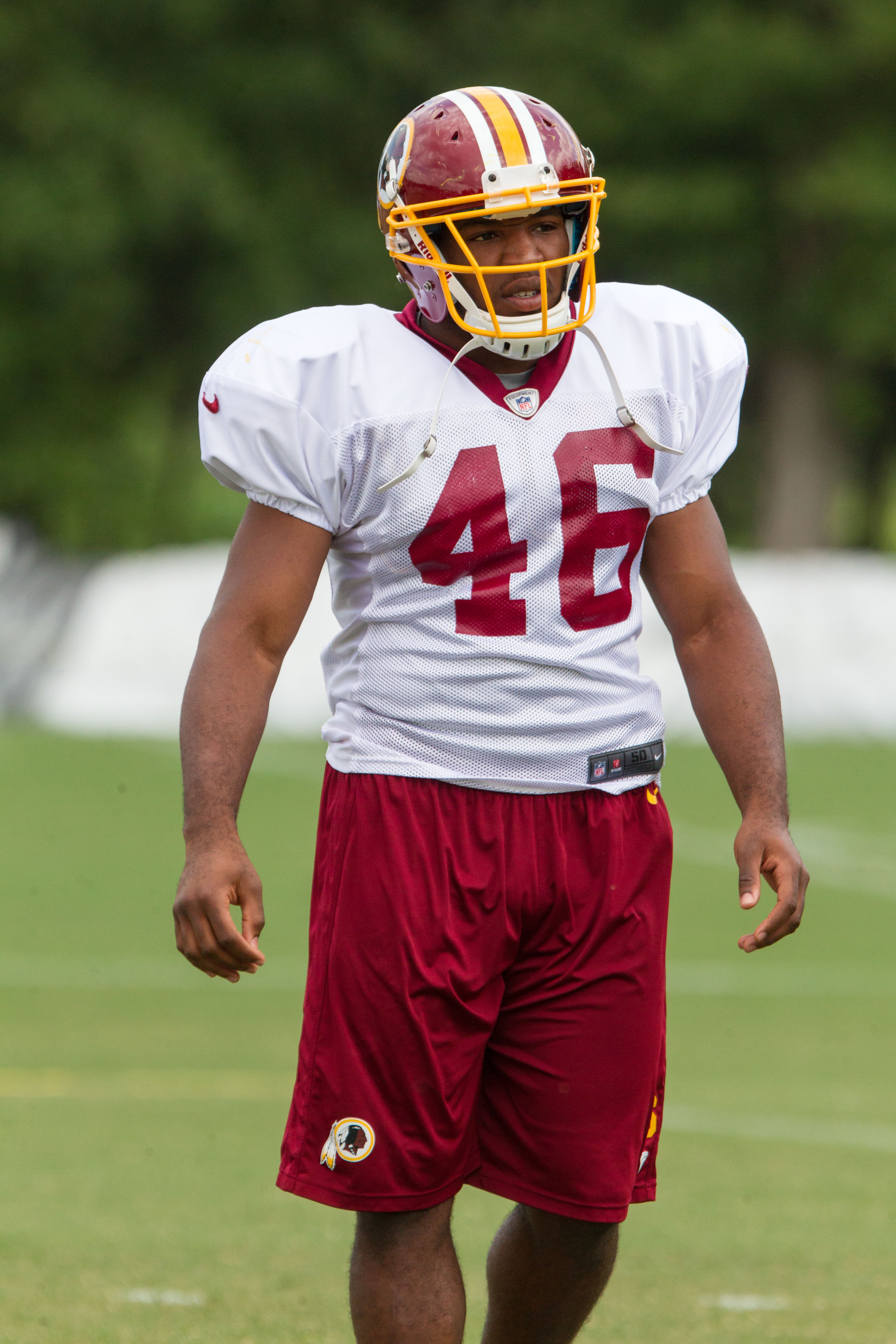
Alfred Morris was drafted in the sixth round of the 2012 draft.

Round	Pick	Player	Position	College
1	2	Robert Griffin III	QB	Baylor
3	71	Josh LeRibeus	OG	Southern Methodist
4	102	Kirk Cousins	QB	Michigan State
4	119	Keenan Robinson	LB	Texas
5	141	Adam Gettis	OG	Iowa
6	173	Alfred Morris	RB	Florida Atlantic
6	193	Tom Compton	OT	South Dakota
7	213	Richard Crawford	CB	Southern Methodist
7	217	Jordan Bernstine	S	Iowa

=== 2013 draft ===
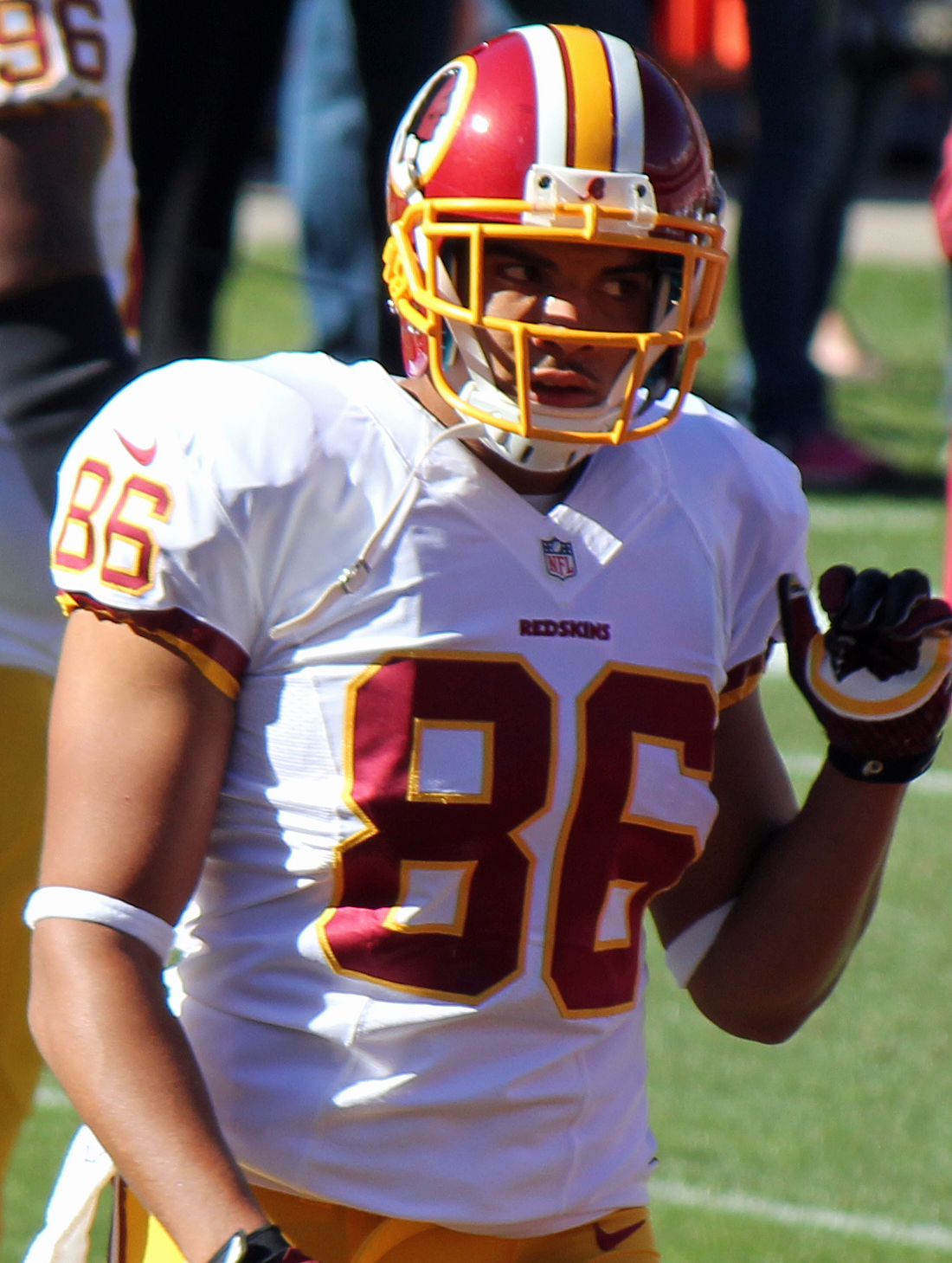
Jordan Reed was drafted in the third round of the 2013 draft.

Round	Pick	Player	Position	College
2	51	David Amerson	CB	North Carolina State
3	85	Jordan Reed	TE	Florida
4	119	Phillip Thomas	S	Fresno State
5	154	Chris Thompson	RB	Florida State
5	162	Brandon Jenkins	DE	Florida State
6	191	Bacarri Rambo	S	Georgia
7	228	Jawan Jamison	RB	Rutgers

=== 2014 draft ===
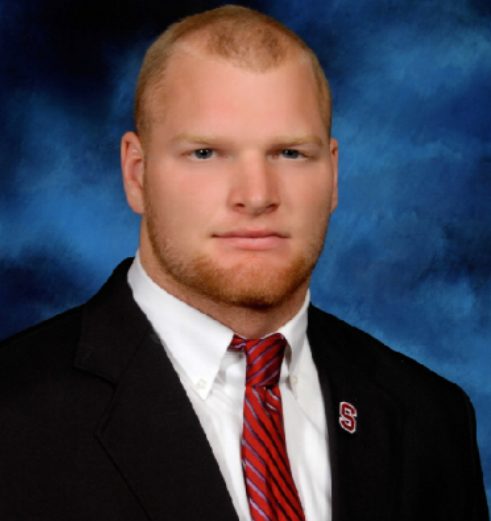
Trent Murphy was drafted in the second round of the 2014 draft.

Round	Pick	Player	Position	College
2	47	Trent Murphy	LB	Stanford
3	66	Morgan Moses	OT	Virginia
3	78	Spencer Long	G	Nebraska
4	102	Bashaud Breeland	CB	Clemson
5	142	Ryan Grant	WR	Tulane
6	186	Lache Seastrunk	RB	Baylor
7	217	Ted Bolser	TE	Indiana
7	228	Zach Hocker	K	Arkansas

=== 2015 draft ===
Round	Pick	Player	Position	College
1	5	Brandon Scherff	G	Iowa
2	38	Preston Smith	DE	Mississippi
3	95	Matt Jones	RB	Florida
4	105	Jamison Crowder	WR	Duke
4	112	Arie Kouandjio	G	Alabama
5	141	Martrell Spaight	LB	Arkansas
6	181	Kyshoen Jarrett	FS	Virginia Tech
6	182	Tevin Mitchel	CB	Arkansas
6	187	Evan Spencer	WR	Ohio State
7	222	Austin Reiter	C	South Florida

=== 2016 draft ===
Round	Pick	Player	Position	College
1	22	Josh Doctson	WR	Texas Christian
2	53	Su'a Cravens	LB	Southern California
3	84	Kendall Fuller	CB	Virginia Tech
5	152	Matt Ioannidis	DE	Temple
6	187	Nate Sudfeld	QB	Indiana
7	232	Steven Daniels	LB	Boston College
7	242	Keith Marshall	RB	Georgia

=== 2017 draft ===
Round	Pick	Player	Position	College
1	17	Jonathan Allen	DT	Alabama
2	49	Ryan Anderson	LB	Alabama
3	81	Fabian Moreau	CB	UCLA
4	114	Samaje Perine	RB	Oklahoma
4	123	Montae Nicholson	S	Michigan State
5	154	Jeremy Sprinkle	TE	Arkansas
6	199	Chase Roullier	C	Wyoming
6	209	Robert Davis	WR	Georgia State
7	230	Josh Harvey-Clemons	LB	Louisville
7	235	Joshua Holsey	CB	Auburn

=== 2018 draft ===
Round	Pick	Player	Position	College
1	13	Daron Payne	NT	Alabama
2	59	Derrius Guice	RB	Louisiana State
3	74	Geron Christian	T	Louisville
4	109	Troy Apke	S	Penn State
5	163	Tim Settle	NT	Virginia Tech
6	197	Shaun Dion Hamilton	LB	Alabama
7	241	Greg Stroman	CB	Virginia Tech
7	256	Trey Quinn	WR	Southern Methodist

=== 2018 supplemental draft ===
For their selection in the supplemental draft, the Washington Football Team forfeited its sixth round pick in the 2019 NFL draft.

Round	Player	Position	College
6	Adonis Alexander	CB	Virginia Tech

=== 2019 draft ===
Round	Pick	Player	Position	College
1	15	Dwayne Haskins	QB	Ohio State
1	26	Montez Sweat	DE	Mississippi State
3	76	Terry McLaurin	WR	Ohio State
4	112	Bryce Love	RB	Stanford
4	131	Wes Martin	G	Indiana
5	153	Ross Pierschbacher	C	Alabama
5	173	Cole Holcomb	LB	North Carolina
6	206	Kelvin Harmon	WR	NC State
7	227	Jimmy Moreland	DB	James Madison
7	253	Jordan Brailford	DE	Oklahoma State

== 2020s ==
=== 2020 draft ===
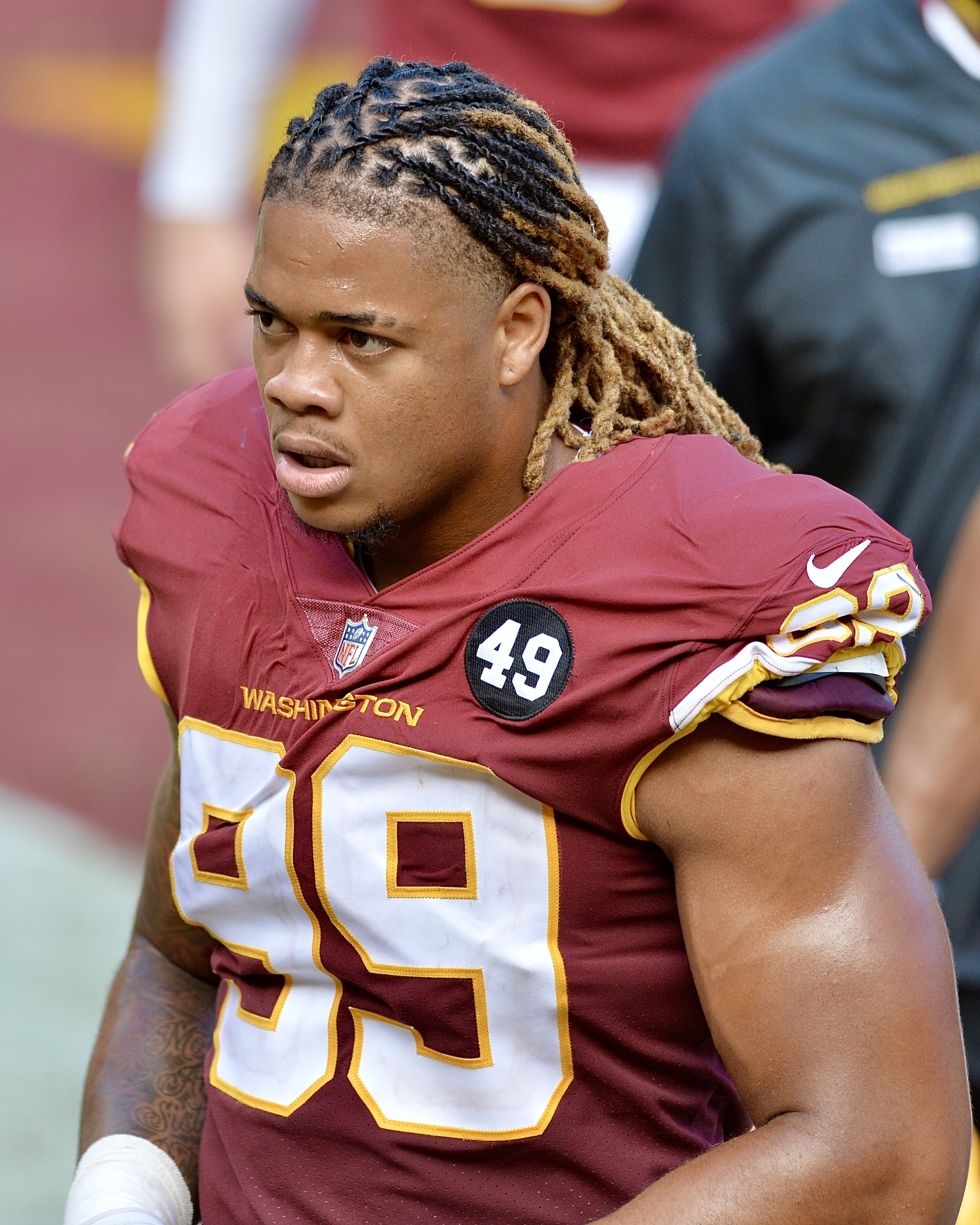
Chase Young, the team's first-round draft selection in 2020, was named NFL Defensive Rookie of the Year

Round	Pick	Player	Position	College
1	2	Chase Young	DE	Ohio State
3	66	Antonio Gibson	RB	Memphis
4	108	Saahdiq Charles	OT	LSU
4	142	Antonio Gandy-Golden	WR	Liberty
5	156	Keith Ismael	C	San Diego State
5	162	Khaleke Hudson	LB	Michigan
7	216	Kamren Curl	SS	Arkansas
7	229	James Smith-Williams	DE	NC State

=== 2021 draft ===
Round	Pick	Player	Position	College
1	19	Jamin Davis	LB	Kentucky
2	51	Sam Cosmi	OT	Texas
3	74	Benjamin St-Juste	CB	Minnesota
3	82	Dyami Brown	WR	North Carolina
4	124	John Bates	TE	Boise State
5	163	Darrick Forrest	SS	Cincinnati
6	225	Camaron Cheeseman	LS	Michigan
7	240	William Bradley-King	DE	Baylor
7	246	Shaka Toney	DE	Penn State
7	258	Dax Milne	WR	Brigham Young

=== 2022 draft ===
Round	Pick	Player	Position	College
1	16	Jahan Dotson	WR	Penn State
2	47	Phidarian Mathis	DT	Alabama
3	98	Brian Robinson Jr.	RB	Alabama
4	113	Percy Butler	FS	Louisiana
5	144	Sam Howell	QB	North Carolina
5	149	Cole Turner	TE	Nevada
7	230	Chris Paul	G	Tulsa
7	240	Christian Holmes	CB	Oklahoma State

=== 2023 draft ===
Round	Pick	Player	Position	College
1	16	Emmanuel Forbes	CB	Mississippi State
2	47	Quan Martin	DB	Illinois
3	97	Ricky Stromberg	C	Arkansas
4	118	Braeden Daniels	OT	Utah
5	137	KJ Henry	DE	Clemson
6	193	Chris Rodriguez Jr.	RB	Kentucky
7	233	Andre Jones Jr.	DE	Louisiana

=== 2024 draft ===
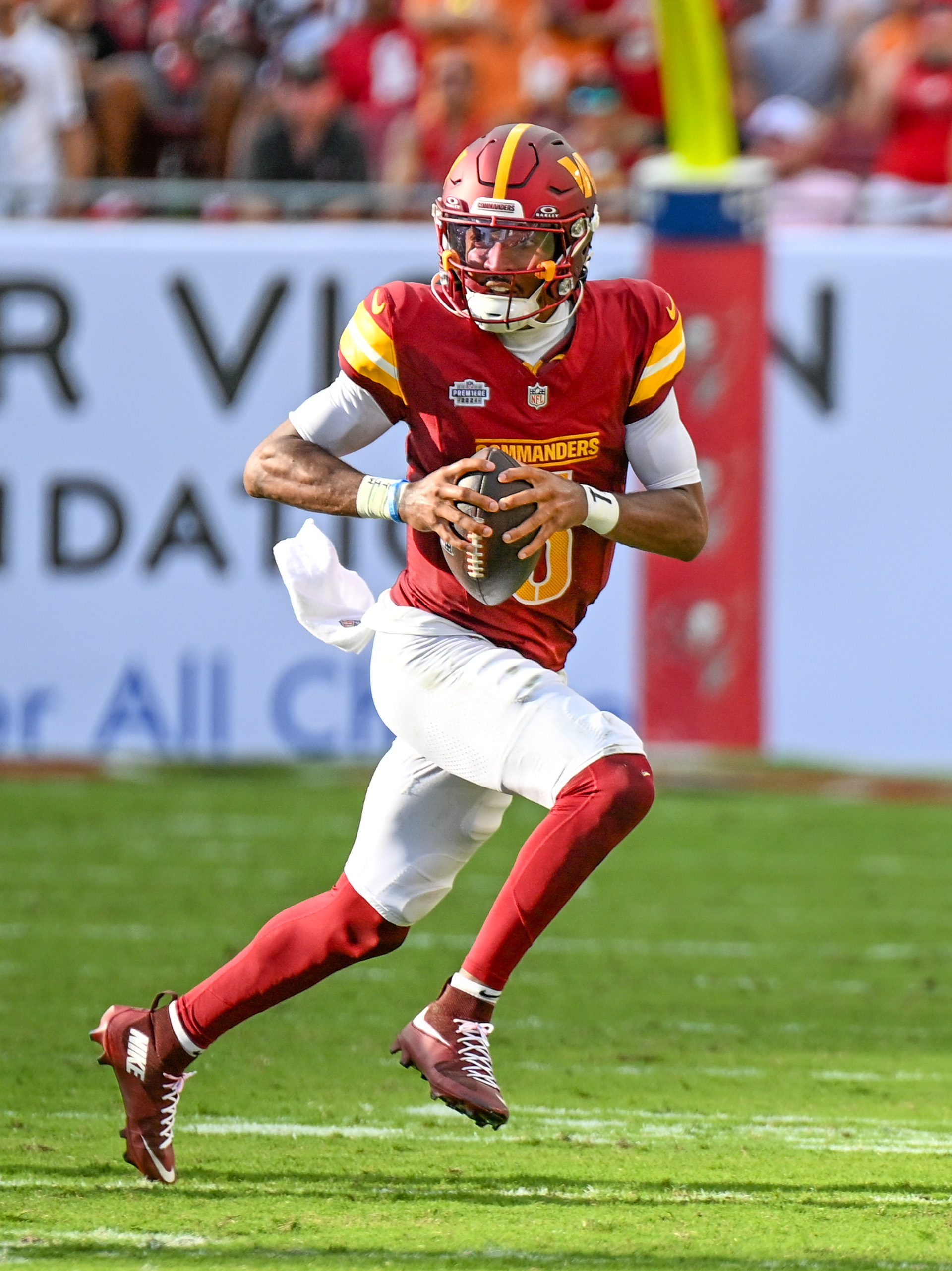
Quarterback Jayden Daniels, selected second overall in 2024, won the NFL Offensive Rookie of the Year award.

Round	Pick	Player	Position	College
1	2	Jayden Daniels	QB	LSU
2	36	Johnny Newton	DT	Illinois
2	50	Mike Sainristil	CB	Michigan
2	53	Ben Sinnott	TE	Kansas State
3	67	Brandon Coleman	OT	TCU
3	100	Luke McCaffrey	WR	Rice
5	139	Jordan Magee	LB	Temple
5	161	Dominique Hampton	LB	Washington
7	222	Javontae Jean-Baptiste	DE	Notre Dame

=== 2025 draft ===
Round	Pick	Player	Position	College
1	29	Josh Conerly Jr.	OT	Oregon
2	61	Trey Amos	CB	Ole Miss
4	128	Jaylin Lane	WR	Virginia Tech
6	205	Kain Medrano	LB	UCLA
7	245	Jacory Croskey-Merritt	RB	Arizona

=== 2026 draft ===
Round	Pick	Player	Position	College
1	7	Sonny Styles	LB	Ohio State
3	71	Antonio Williams	WR	Clemson
5	147	Joshua Josephs	DE	Tennessee
6	187	Kaytron Allen	RB	Penn State
6	209	Matt Gulbin	C	Michigan State
7	223	Athan Kaliakmanis	QB	Rutgers

== See also ==
- List of Washington Commanders first-round draft picks
- History of the Washington Commanders
