= George Hughley =

American football player (1939–1999)

No. 39
- Position: Fullback

Personal information
- Born: June 26, 1939; Los Angeles, California
- Died: February 27, 1999 (aged 59)

Career information
- High school: Santa Monica (Santa Monica, California)
- College: Central Oklahoma

Career history
- 1964: Toronto Argonauts
- 1965: Washington Redskins
- Stats at Pro Football Reference

George Charles Hughley (June 26, 1939 – February 27, 1999) was an American football fullback who played for the Washington Redskins and Toronto Argonauts.

== Career ==
After graduating from Santa Monica High School, Hughley played football at Central State College in Oklahoma. He played in the Canadian Football League for the Toronto Argonauts in 1964. He played in the National Football League (NFL) for the Washington Redskins in 1965. He rushed the ball 37 times for 175 yards and no touchdowns that season; he also caught nine passes for 93 yards and one touchdown.

== Death ==
By 1999, Hughley was a 20-year police department veteran from San Fernando, California. He was riding his motorcycle when he was struck from the rear by a car on the Foothill Freeway near Angeles Crest Highway. Hughley was on loan to a Southern California drug task force assigned to investigate major drug traffickers. He was taken by helicopter to Huntington Hospital in Pasadena, California, but he died more than two hours later.
