= Lonnie Sanders =

American football player (born 1941)

No. 40, 42
- Position: Cornerback

Personal information
- Born: November 6, 1941 (age 85); Detroit, Michigan, U.S.
- Listed height: 6 ft 3 in (1.91 m)
- Listed weight: 207 lb (94 kg)

Career information
- High school: Pershing (Detroit)
- College: Michigan State (1959–1962)
- NFL draft: 1963: 2nd round, 22nd overall pick
- AFL draft: 1963: 10th round, 77th overall pick

Career history
- Washington Redskins (1963–1967); St. Louis Cardinals (1968–1969)

Career NFL statistics
- Interceptions: 12
- Fumble recoveries: 1
- Sacks: 1
- Stats at Pro Football Reference

Lonnie J. Sanders Jr. (born November 6, 1941) is an American former professional football player who was a cornerback in the National Football League (NFL) for the Washington Redskins and St. Louis Cardinals. He played college football for the Michigan State Spartans and was selected in the second round of the 1963 NFL draft. Sanders was also selected in the tenth round of the 1963 AFL draft by the Denver Broncos.
