= John Seedborg =

American football player (1943–2018)

No. 38, 68, 50
- Position: Punter

Personal information
- Born: January 23, 1943; Paso Robles, California, U.S.
- Died: December 14, 2018 (aged 75); Chesapeake, Virginia, U.S.
- Listed height: 6 ft 0 in (1.83 m)
- Listed weight: 227 lb (103 kg)

Career information
- High school: Woodrow Wilson (Long Beach, California)
- College: Arizona State (1960-1963)
- NFL draft: 1964: 19th round, 255th overall pick

Career history
- Joliet Chargers (1964); Washington Redskins (1965); Orange County Ramblers (1967-1968); Portland Loggers (1969)

Career NFL statistics
- Punts: 7
- Punting yards: 247
- Longest punt: 49
- Stats at Pro Football Reference

John Sherwood Seedborg (January 23, 1943 – December 14, 2018) was an American football guard and kicker in the National Football League (NFL) for the Washington Redskins. He played college football at Arizona State University and was drafted in the nineteenth round of the 1964 NFL draft.
