= Robert Reed (guard) =

American football player (1943–2009)

Robert Reed, Jr.
No. 67, 60, 58, 62
- Position: Guard

Personal information
- Born: February 23, 1943; Longview, Texas, U.S.
- Died: September 1, 2009 (aged 66)
- Listed height: 6 ft 3 in (1.91 m)
- Listed weight: 250 lb (113 kg)

Career information
- High school: Marshall (Marshall, Texas)
- College: Tennessee State (1961–1964)
- NFL draft: 1965: 16th round, 217th overall pick
- AFL draft: 1965: 12th round, 90th overall pick

Career history
- Washington Redskins (1965); Winnipeg Blue Bombers (1966–1967); Orlando Panthers (1969)

Career NFL statistics
- Games played: 8
- Stats at Pro Football Reference

Robert Reed Jr. (February 23, 1943 – September 1, 2009) was an American football offensive lineman in the National Football League (NFL) for the Washington Redskins. He played college football at Tennessee State University and was drafted in the 16th round of the 1965 NFL draft. Reed was also selected in the 12th round of the 1965 AFL draft by the Houston Oilers.

Reed died on September 1, 2009, at the age of 66.
