= Willie Adams (gridiron football) =

American football player (1941–2019)

No. 50
- Positions: Defensive end, linebacker

Personal information
- Born: December 12, 1941; Corpus Christi, Texas, U.S.
- Died: September 28, 2019 (aged 77); Fort Worth, Texas, U.S.
- Listed height: 6 ft 2 in (1.88 m)
- Listed weight: 240 lb (109 kg)

Career information
- High school: Roy Miller (TX)
- College: New Mexico State
- NFL draft: 1965: 11th round, 146th overall pick

Career history
- Washington Redskins (1965–1966); Montreal Alouettes (1968–1969)

Career NFL statistics
- Games played: 28
- Stats at Pro Football Reference

Willie James "Hawk" Adams (December 12, 1941 – September 28, 2019) was an American professional football defensive end and linebacker for the Washington Redskins of the National Football League (NFL) and the Montreal Alouettes of the Canadian Football League (CFL).

== Biography ==
=== Early life ===
Willie Adams was born December 12, 1941 at Corpus Christi, Texas. He was nicknamed "Hawk" by his brother due to his ability to find errant balls on the golf course. He would play there for the 1968 and 1969 seasons.

=== Career ===
He played college football at New Mexico State University and was drafted in the eleventh round of the 1965 NFL draft.

A linebacker and a special teams player, Adams saw action in all 14 games for the Redskins in both the 1965 NFL season and the 1966 NFL season before being consigned to the practice squad in 1967. He was primarily used on special teams during this 1965 rookie year, but did start 4 games for the team at defensive end due to injury in 1967.

Adams was unable to win a place on the Redskins for 1968 and signed instead with the Montreal Alouettes of the Canadian Football League.

=== Death ===
He died on September 28, 2019, aged 77. He is survived by his wife Henrietta, children Deborah, Willie, Jr., Cynthia, Mark, Wendell, and Hammond, as well as seventeen grandchildren, and seven great-grandchildren.
