= Robert Briggs (American football) =

American football player (born 1941)

Bob Briggs
No. 30
- Position: Fullback

Personal information
- Born: January 12, 1941 (age 85); Amarillo, Texas, U.S.
- Listed height: 6 ft 1 in (1.85 m)
- Listed weight: 228 lb (103 kg)

Career information
- High school: Carver (Amarillo)
- College: Central Oklahoma (1961–1964)
- NFL draft: 1965: 10th round, 133rd overall pick

Career history
- Washington Redskins (1965)

Career NFL statistics
- Rushing yards: 10
- Rushing average: 1.7
- Receptions: 3
- Receiving yards: 40
- Stats at Pro Football Reference

Robert Louis Briggs (born January 12, 1941) is an American former professional football player who was a fullback in the National Football League (NFL) for the Washington Redskins. He played college football for the Central Oklahoma Broncos and was selected in the tenth round of the 1965 NFL draft. Briggs went to Carver High School in Amarillo, Texas.
