= Tom Walters (American football) =

American football player (born 1942)

No. 43
- Position: Safety

Personal information
- Born: June 11, 1942 (age 84); Petal, Mississippi, U.S.
- Listed height: 6 ft 2 in (1.88 m)
- Listed weight: 195 lb (88 kg)

Career information
- High school: Petal
- College: Southern Miss
- NFL draft: 1964: 16th round, 214th overall pick

Career history
- Washington Redskins (1964–1967)

Career NFL statistics
- Games played: 49
- Interceptions: 3
- Stats at Pro Football Reference

Thomas Herrin Walters (born June 11, 1942) is an American former professional football player who was a safety for the Washington Redskins of the National Football League (NFL) from 1964 to 1967. Walters played college football for the Southern Miss Golden Eagles.
