= History of the Washington Commanders =

Sports team history

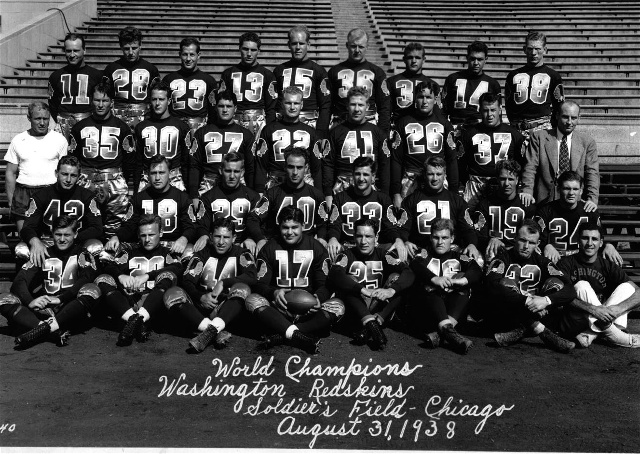
Team photo of the 1938 Washington Redskins.

The Washington Commanders are a professional American football franchise based in the Washington metropolitan area. The Commanders compete in the National Football League (NFL) as a member club of the National Football Conference (NFC) East division. The team was founded in 1932 as the Boston Braves, named after the local baseball franchise. The franchise changed its name the following year to the Redskins and moved to Washington, D.C. in 1937. The Redskins name and logo was viewed as controversial by some for decades before it was retired in 2020 as part of a wave of name changes during a period of racial unrest in the United States. The team played as the Washington Football Team before rebranding as the Commanders in 2022.

The Redskins won three Super Bowl championships (Super Bowl XVII, Super Bowl XXII, and Super Bowl XXVI). They also played in and lost Super Bowl VII and Super Bowl XVIII. Before the AFL and NFL merged in 1970, Washington won two NFL Championships (1937 and 1942). They also played in and lost the 1936, 1940, 1943, and 1945 Championship games. Only six teams have appeared in more Super Bowls than the Redskins: the New England Patriots (11), Dallas Cowboys (eight), Pittsburgh Steelers (eight), Denver Broncos (eight), San Francisco 49ers (eight), and the Kansas City Chiefs (six); Washington's five appearances are tied with the Green Bay Packers, Las Vegas Raiders, Los Angeles Rams, Miami Dolphins, and New York Giants.

All of the franchise's championships were attained during two 10-year spans. The first period of success was from 1936 to 1945, when they went to the NFL Championship six times, winning two of them. The second period of success was from 1982 and 1991, when they appeared in the postseason seven times, captured four Conference titles, and won three Super Bowls. This period included the 1983 and 1991 seasons when the team won 14 games, the most the team has won in a single season.

Washington has also experienced periods of extended failure in its history. The most notable period of continued failure was from 1946 to 1970, when they posted only four winning seasons and did not have a single postseason appearance. During this period, they went without a single winning season between 1956 and 1968 and posted their worst regular-season record in franchise history, going 1–12–1 in 1961. Washington experienced its second period of failure, which began in 1993 and continued through the entire franchise ownership of Daniel Snyder until their 2024 season. Since 1993, they have posted only nine winning seasons and seven postseason appearances.

== George Preston Marshall ownership (1932–1965) ==
=== Boston Braves / Redskins (1932–1936) ===
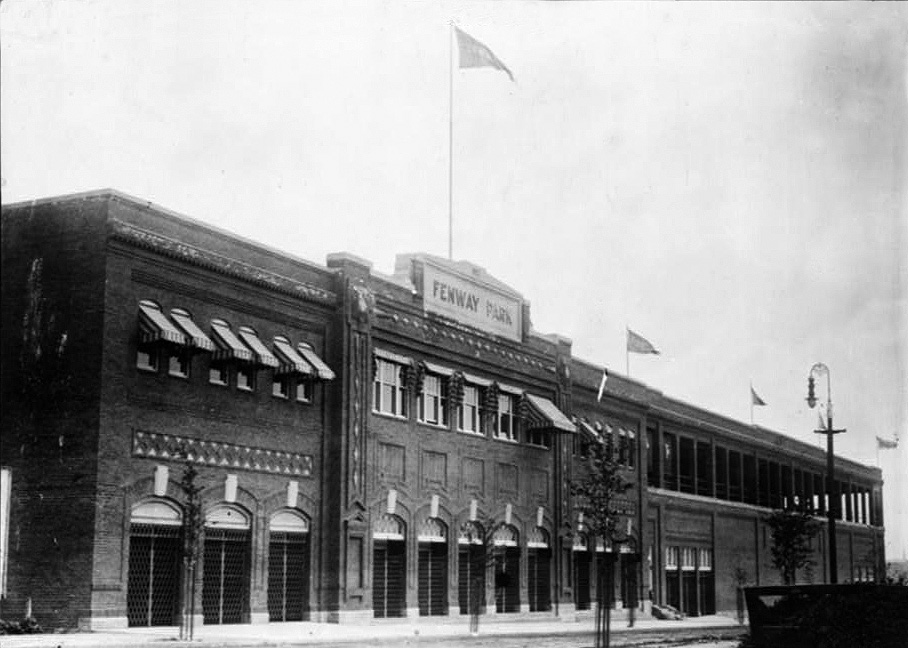
Fenway Park was the home of the Boston Braves/Redskins from 1933 to 1936.

The city of Boston was awarded an NFL franchise on July 9, 1932, under the ownership of George Preston Marshall, Vincent Bendix, Jay O'Brien, and Dorland Doyle. The team took the place of the temporary traveling Cleveland Indians, who themselves were operated under the franchise of the Newark Tornadoes after the Tornadoes had left the league after the 1930 season and had sold its franchise rights back to the NFL. Despite this, neither team management nor the NFL claim that the Indians or Tornadoes were earlier incarnations of the team currently in Washington. Additionally, none of the members of the 1930 Newark Tornadoes roster, and only two of the 1931 Indians (Algy Clark and Dale Waters), remained on the 1932 Boston Braves roster.

Initially, the new team took the same name as their landlords, the Boston Braves, one of the two local Major League Baseball (MLB) teams. The Braves played their first game on October 2, 1932, under the leadership of coach Lud Wray, against the Brooklyn Dodgers, to whom they lost 14–0. The next week, the Braves recorded their first win, beating the New York Giants 14–6. The new franchise's losses during the first season reached $46,000 ($1,052,789 in 2024) and Bendix, O'Brien, and Doyle dropped out of the investment, leaving Marshall the sole owner of the Braves. The team moved to Fenway Park (home of the Boston Red Sox) the next year, and Marshall changed the name to "Redskins". According to ESPN, the team has long contended it was named in honor of Marshall's head coach, William Henry "Lone Star" Dietz, who was believed to be part Sioux. A 1933 news article quotes Marshall as saying that he did not name the team specifically in honor of Dietz or any of the team's native members, but because Marshall wanted to avoid any confusion with the Braves baseball squad while still keeping the native connotations of the previous moniker.

Dietz's first year as coach in 1933 was unremarkable, and the Redskins finished with a 5–5–2 record. However, one impressive feat during the season was Cliff Battles' performance against the New York Giants on October 8, 1933, when he rushed 16 times for 215 yards (197 m) and scored one touchdown and became the first player ever to rush for more than 200 yards (180 m) in a game.

Dietz was fired after posting a 6–6 record in 1934, and Eddie Casey was hired as his replacement. During the 1935 season, the Redskins split their first two games before going into a season-long scoring slump, posting only 23 points during a seven-game losing streak. The Redskins posted a win and a tie in their final two games, finishing with a 2–8–1 record, scoring only 65 points on the season. Casey was fired at the end of the season.

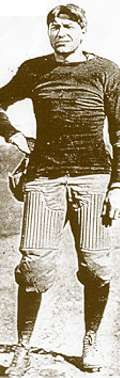
Lone Star Dietz was the head coach of the Redskins from 1933 to 1934.

==== 1936 ====
The Redskins' most productive year in Boston came in 1936. It started with the first annual NFL draft on February 8, 1936, in which the Redskins had the second overall pick. Their first selection as an NFL team was Riley Smith, a blocking back from Alabama. The first player ever selected in the draft, Heisman Trophy winner Jay Berwanger, chose not to play pro football. Because of this, Smith holds the distinction of being the first drafted player to play in the National Football League. Later in the draft, the Redskins selected Wayne Millner, who became a large part of their offense. The next big addition was the hiring of Ray Flaherty as head coach. In the following decade, Flaherty led the team to two NFL championships and four divisional titles.

After starting the season 4–5, the Redskins won their last three games to finish with a record of 7–5, attaining both their first winning record and their first Eastern Division Championship. However, during the final game of the regular season, a 30–0 win over the Pittsburgh Pirates, only 4,813 fans showed up to Fenway Park. An angry Marshall then decided to give up home field advantage for the 1936 NFL Championship Game. The game was then played on December 13, 1936, at New York's Polo Grounds, where they lost to the Green Bay Packers, 21–6.

==== 1936/1937 offseason ====
"I moved my team to Washington because the Boston papers gave girls' field hockey more coverage than the Redskins," Marshall said in 1953. Before leaving Massachusetts, however, the Redskins made one more big addition that helped their franchise for years to come. The addition came after the 1937 NFL draft on December 12, 1936, when they signed an innovative rookie quarterback from Texas Christian University: Sammy Baugh. In an era where the forward pass was relatively rare, the Redskins used it as their primary method of gaining yards. "Slingin' Sammy" Baugh also played numerous other positions, including cornerback and punter.

=== First years in D.C. (1937–1945) ===
Following the 1936 season, the team relocated from Boston to Washington, D.C.

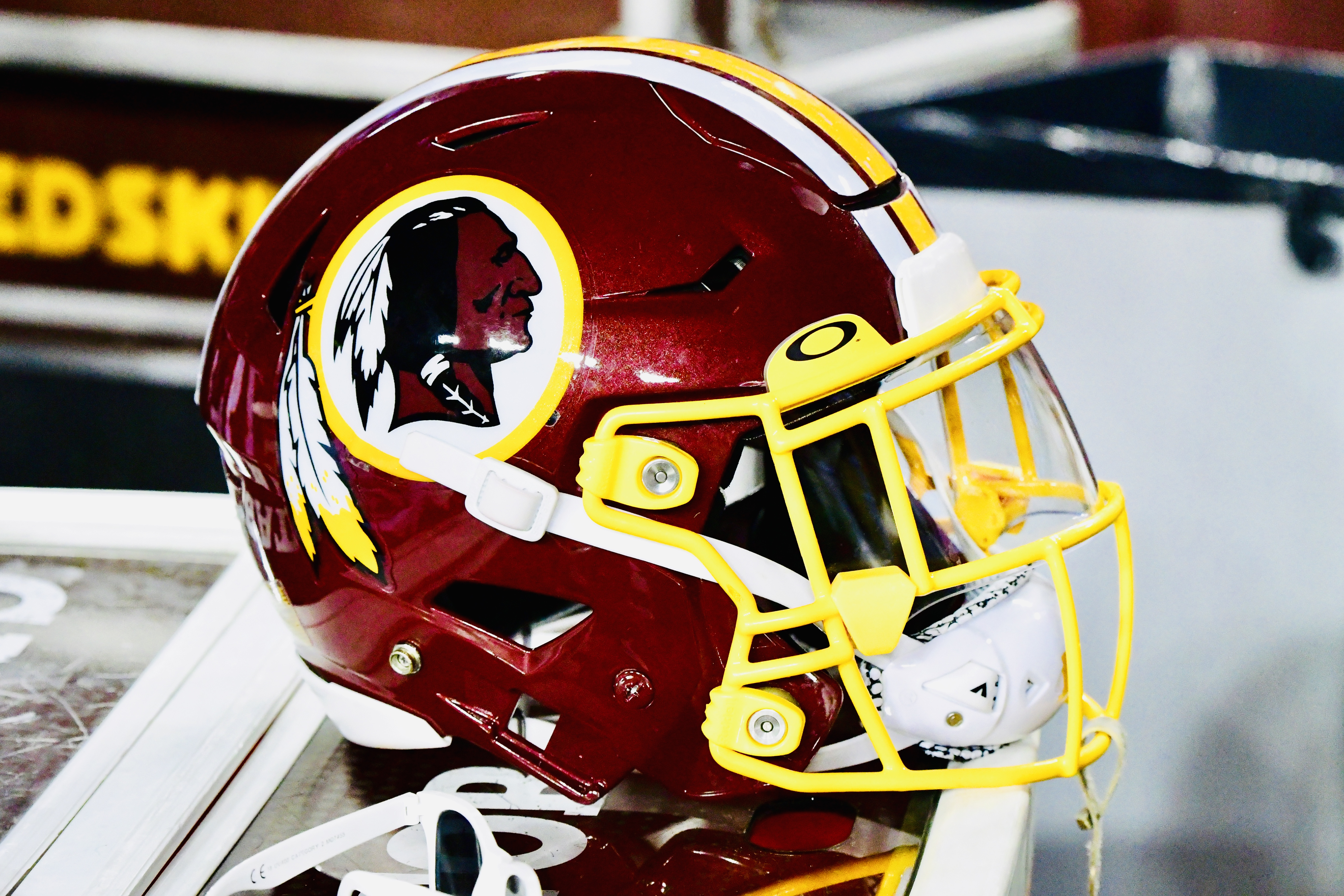
Washington Redskins helmet in 2019. The team is now known as the Washington Commanders.

After the disappointing 1936 NFL title game, George Preston Marshall had the team moved to his home in Washington, D.C., on February 13, 1937, retaining the name "Redskins" although it was now out of context. They then shared Griffith Stadium with the Washington Senators baseball team.

Marshall sought to incorporate many elements of the college football atmosphere into Redskins games. At the time, the college game was far more popular than the NFL, which was still shaking off its barnstorming roots. On August 9, 1937, the Redskins marching band was founded. The all-volunteer ensemble formed when Marshall brought the Redskins to Washington, with the goal of entertaining fans from the moment they walked into the stadium until the time they left it. The Redskins are now one of only two teams in the NFL with an official marching band. The other is the Baltimore Ravens. The Redskins were also one of the first teams to have a fight song, "Hail to the Redskins", which made its debut on August 17, 1938, as the official fight song of the Redskins. The song was composed by band leader Barnee Breeskin and the lyrics were written by actress Corinne Griffith, the wife of Marshall.

==== 1937 ====
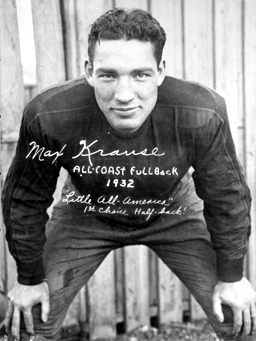
Max Krause was a running back for the Redskins from 1937 to 1940.

The Redskins played their first game and had their first victory in Washington, D.C., on September 16, 1937, against the Giants. The Thursday night game drew nearly 25,000 fans to Griffith Stadium and culminated with Riley Smith scoring on a 60-yard (55 m) interception return, making the final score 13–3.

On December 5, 1937, the Redskins earned their first division title in Washington by beating the Giants 49–14, including two touchdown runs by Cliff Battles for 75 and 76 yards (69 m), for the Eastern Championship. The team then proceeded to win their first league championship, the 1937 NFL Championship Game, on December 12, 1937, against the Chicago Bears, their first season in D.C.

==== 1938 ====
The 1938 season started with the 1938 NFL draft and the selection of Andy Farkas. The Redskins then went 6–3–2, which was good enough for second place in the division.

==== 1939 ====
On October 15, 1939, the Redskins achieved an NFL first when Frank Filchock threw the first 99-yard (91 m) touchdown pass in NFL history, to Andy Farkas, in a game against his old team, the Pirates. This set a record for the longest play from scrimmage, a record that can only be tied, not broken.

==== 1940 ====
The Redskins won nine games in 1940 and finished on top of the Eastern Division. They met the Bears again in the 1940 NFL Championship Game on December 8, 1940, in Washington, D.C. The Redskins were annihilated by the Bears 73–0 for the most lopsided score in NFL history.

The other big loss for the Redskins that season occurred during a coin-tossing ceremony prior to a game against the Giants. After calling the coin toss and shaking hands with the opposing team captain, Turk Edwards attempted to pivot around to head back to his sideline. However, his cleats caught in the grass and his knee gave way, injuring him and bringing his season and career to an unusual end.

"With that big Yankee playing end, please accept my
resignation if we do not win the championship this year!."

— Head coach Ray Flaherty to George Preston Marshall,
on the acquisition of Wayne Millner

==== 1941–1944 ====
Though the Redskins failed to make the 1941 NFL Championship Game with a record of 6–5, the 1941 season is still worth mentioning because of one game. The Redskins won their last game of the season by beating the Philadelphia Eagles, 20–14. However, few remember that day for the game, because it occurred on December 7, 1941, the same day as the Attack on Pearl Harbor, a surprise attack against the United States' naval base at Pearl Harbor, Hawaii by the Japanese Navy that resulted in the death of over 2,400 Americans and brought the United States into World War II. On a more personal note for the Redskins, this act ultimately drove two of the most popular Redskins players, Frankie Filchock and Wayne Millner, to enlist in the U.S. Navy.

In what became an early NFL rivalry, the Redskins and Bears met two more times in the NFL Championship. The second was during the 1942 NFL Championship Game on December 13, 1942, where the franchise won their second championship, 14–6, over the previously undefeated Bears. The final time the two met was the 1943 NFL Championship Game on December 26, 1943, during which the Bears won, 41–21. The most notable accomplishment achieved during the Redskins' 1943 season was Sammy Baugh leading the NFL in passing, punting, and interceptions.

==== 1945 ====
The Redskins played in the NFL Championship one more time before a quarter-century drought that did not end until the 1972 season. With former Olympic gold medalist Dudley DeGroot as their new head coach, the Redskins went 8–2 during the 1945 season. One of the most impressive performances came from Sammy Baugh, who had a completion percentage of .703. They ended the season by losing to the Cleveland Rams 15–14 in the 1945 NFL Championship Game on December 16, 1945. The one-point margin of victory came under scrutiny because of a safety early in the game. In the first quarter, the Redskins had the ball at their own 5-yard (4.6 m) line. Dropping back into the end zone, quarterback Sammy Baugh threw to an open receiver, but the ball hit the goal post (which at the time was on the goal line instead of at the back of the end zone) and bounced back to the ground in the end zone. Under the rules at the time, this was ruled as a safety and thus gave the Rams a 2–0 lead. It was that safety that proved to be the margin of victory. Owner Marshall was so mad at the outcome that he became a major force in passing the following major rule change after the season: A forward pass that strikes the goal posts is automatically ruled incomplete. This later became known as the "Baugh/Marshall Rule",

=== Disarray and resistance to integration (1946–1961) ===
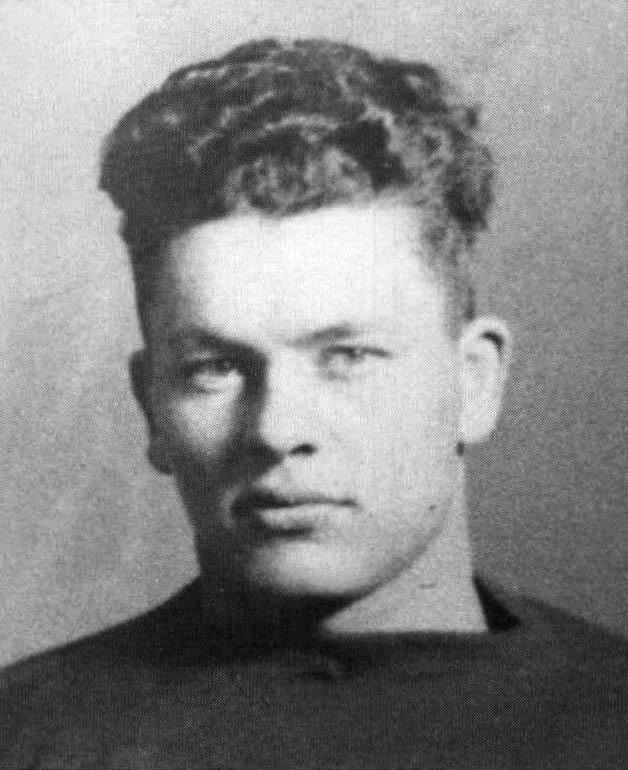
Curly Lambeau was the head coach of the Redskins from 1952 to 1953. He was elected into the Pro Football Hall of Fame in 1963.

The Redskins' early success endeared them to the fans of Washington, D.C. However, after 1945, the franchise began a slow decline that was not ended until a playoff appearance in the 1971 season.

The 1946 season began with the signing of former player Turk Edwards as head coach. He was the coach until 1948 and finished with an unimpressive record of 16–18–1. The only highlight that occurred during his tenure was Sammy Baugh's 1947 season, where he threw 354 passes, completed 210 of them for 2,938 yards (2,687 m), setting three all-time NFL records in one season. A major blunder also occurred during his tenure. With the ninth overall pick in the 1946 NFL draft, the Redskins chose Cal Rossi, a back out of UCLA. However, Rossi was a junior, and at that time ineligible to be drafted. After waiting a year, the Redskins drafted Rossi again in the first-round of the 1947 NFL draft, but he never had the intention to play football professionally.

After the end of Edwards' coaching career, the Redskins hired three different head coaches during the next three seasons: John Whelchel, Herman Ball, and former player Dick Todd, but none were successful.

"Jurgensen is a great quarterback. He hangs in
there under adverse conditions. He may be the best
the league has ever seen. He is the best I have seen."

— Vince Lombardi, on quarterback Sonny Jurgensen

Nevertheless, this did not stop George Preston Marshall from trying to make the Redskins the most successful franchise in the league. His first major innovation occurred on June 14, 1950, when it was announced that American Oil Company planned to televise all Redskins games, making Washington the first NFL team to have an entire season of televised games. Before that, in 1944, the Redskins formed a radio network to broadcast their games throughout the southern United States.

His next major change came in February 1952, when he hired former Green Bay Packers and Chicago Cardinals coach Earl "Curly" Lambeau. However, after two seasons, Marshall fired Lambeau following the Redskins loss in their exhibition opener to the Los Angeles Rams and hired Joe Kuharich. In 1955, Kuharich led the Redskins to their first winning season in ten years and was named both Sporting News Coach of the Year and UPI NFL Coach of the Year.

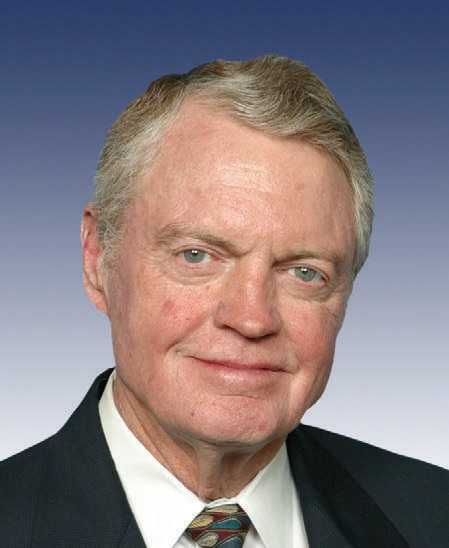
Tom Osborne, who played wide receiver for Washington between 1960 and 1961, was elected to serve in the U.S. House of Representatives from 2001 to 2007.

After Kuharich resigned as coach to accept the Notre Dame head coaching position, Marshall hired Mike Nixon before the 1959 season. Over the next two seasons, Nixon proved to be statistically the worst coach the Redskins have had in terms of winning percentage, with a record of 4–18–2. In the 1961 draft, the Redskins made another poor draft choice in QB Norm Snead and passing over Fran Tarkenton, who later became a Hall-of-Famer after his career with the Vikings and Giants. In 1961, the Redskins moved into their new stadium called D.C. Stadium (changed to Robert F. Kennedy Memorial Stadium in 1969). The first game in the new D.C. Stadium occurred on October 1, 1961, in front of 37,767 fans. However, the Redskins failed to hold a 21–7 lead and lost to the New York Giants 24–21. Along with stadiums, Marshall decided to change head coaches again, this time choosing Bill McPeak. Though McPeak's coaching record was nothing to be proud of (21–46–3 over five seasons), he is better known for helping the Redskins draft future stars such as wide receiver Charley Taylor, tight end Jerry Smith, safety Paul Krause, center Len Hauss, and linebacker Chris Hanburger. He also helped pull off two of the best trades of the 1960s, gaining quarterback Sonny Jurgensen from the Philadelphia Eagles and linebacker Sam Huff from the New York Giants. However, even with these additions, the Redskins were still not performing up to expectations. While the Redskins became more popular than ever, they struggled through the 1960s.

==== Integration controversy ====
During most of this unsuccessful period, Marshall continued to refuse to integrate the team, despite pressure from The Washington Post and the federal government of the United States. A typical comment by Post writer Shirley Povich was

Jim Brown, born ineligible to play for the Redskins, integrated their end zone three times yesterday.

"I think it is quite plain that if he wants an argument,
he is going to have a moral argument with the
president and with the administration."

— Secretary of the Interior Stewart Udall, on
Marshall's refusal to integrate the Redskins

On March 24, 1961, Secretary of the Interior Stewart Udall warned Marshall to hire black players or face federal retribution. For the first time in history, the federal government had attempted to desegregate a professional sports team. Finally, under threat of civil rights legal action by the Kennedy administration, which would have prevented a segregated team from playing at the new District of Columbia stadium, as it was owned by the U.S. Department of the Interior and thus federal government property, the Redskins became the final pro football franchise to integrate, in 1962, in their second season in the stadium. First, the team drafted Ernie Davis, the first black player to win the Heisman Trophy. Two days before, the Buffalo Bills of the American Football League had also drafted Davis and there was some doubt as to whether Marshall would offer enough money to sign him. For their second pick in the draft, the Redskins chose another black halfback, Joe Hernandez from Arizona. They also took black fullback Ron Hatcher in the eighth round, a player from Michigan State who became the first black football player to sign a contract with the Redskins.

"Why Negroes particularly? Why not make us hire a player
from any other race? Of course we have had players who
played like girls, but never an actual girl player."

— Marshall's rebuttal in response to the ultimatum
from the Kennedy administration

In 1961, the Redskins drafted their first African-American player and first black Heisman Trophy winner, RB Ernie Davis. However, in mid-December, Marshall (who once was infamously described by Povich as the man who kept the Redskins team colors "burgundy, gold, and Caucasian") announced that on the day of the NFL draft he had clandestinely traded the rights to Davis (who refused to play for Marshall) to the Cleveland Browns, who wanted Davis to join the league's leading rusher, Jim Brown, in their backfield. Davis was traded to the Browns for running back Bobby Mitchell (who became a wide receiver in Washington) and 1962 first-round draft choice Leroy Jackson. The move was made under unfortunate circumstances – as it turned out that Davis had leukemia, and died without ever playing a down in professional football.

"The integration success story of the Kennedy
administration, didn't take place in Mississippi
but here in the backyard of the nation's capital."

— Boston Globe columnist Wilfrid Rodgers,
on the recently integrated Redskins

Although Bobby Mitchell was only welcomed to the team grudgingly, he was nonetheless joined by black stars like receiver Charley Taylor, running back Larry Brown (who had a hearing aid installed in his helmet due to near-total deafness in his right ear), defensive back Brig Owens, and guard John Nisby from the Pittsburgh Steelers. The Redskins ended the 1962 season with their best record in five years: 5–7–2. Mitchell led the league with eleven touchdowns, caught 72 passes and was selected to the Pro Bowl. He was eventually elected to the Pro Football Hall of Fame and became assistant general manager of the Redskins. Nisby had three successful seasons with the team and then was released. 1963 saw the Redskins fall to 3–11, with Norm Snead throwing 27 interceptions, then 1964 and 1965 saw two consecutive 6–8 seasons after which Bill McPeak was fired.

== Edward Bennett Williams ownership (1965–1979) ==
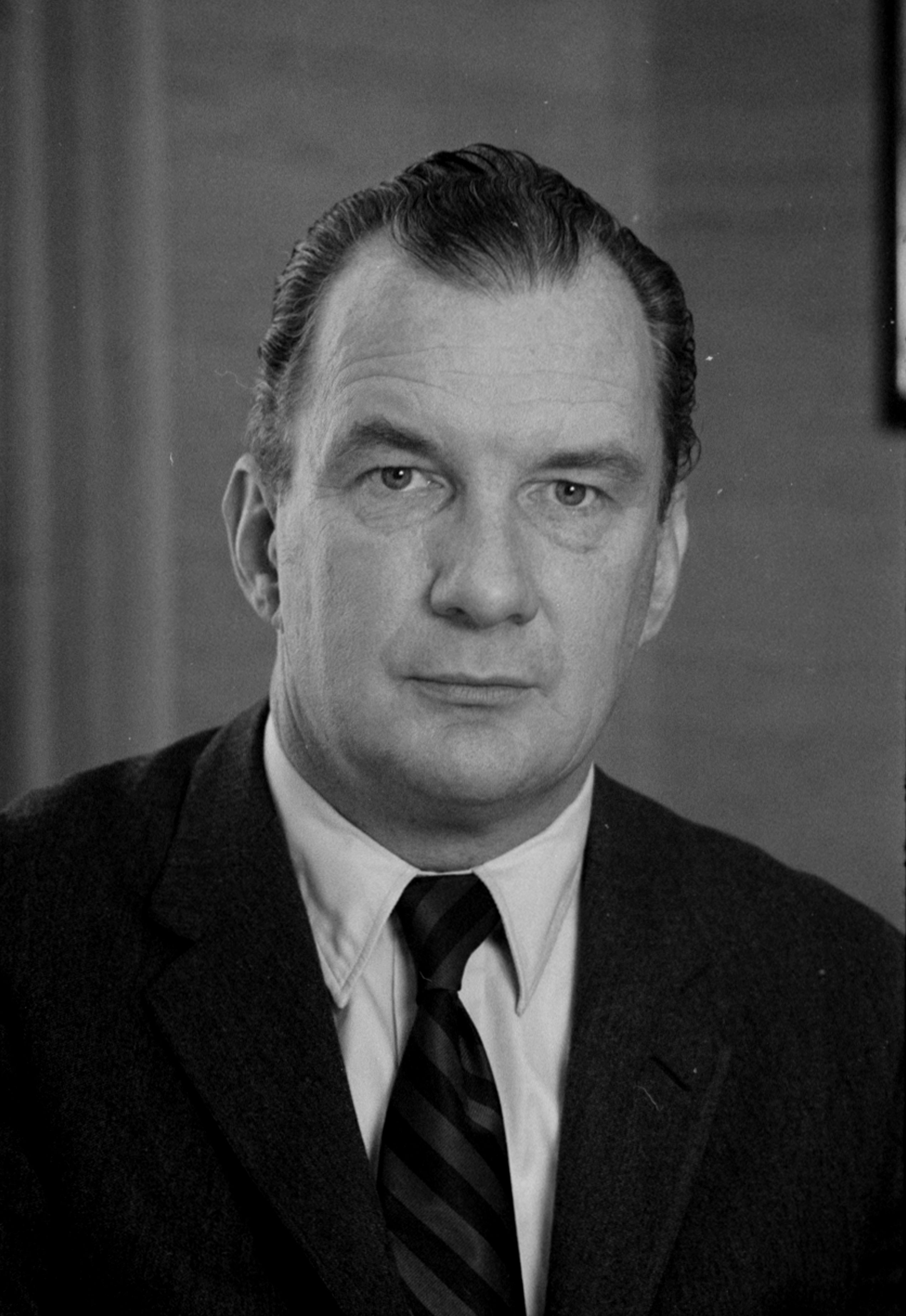
Edward Bennett Williams, team president and minority stockholder, became controlling owner of the Redskins in 1965 following Marshall's decline in health.

When Marshall became seriously ill by 1965, he appointed team president and minority shareholder Edward Bennett Williams to run the team's daily operations. After Marshall's death on August 9, 1969, Williams bought controlling interest in the franchise from Marshall's estate. In 1969, Williams hired former Green Bay Packers head coach Vince Lombardi for the same role, granting him a 5% stake in ownership and full control over football operations as the team's executive vice president. Lombardi coached the Redskins to a 7–5–2 record, their first winning season since 1955, but died from cancer shortly before the start of the 1970 season. Bill Austin, appointed earlier by Lombardi, served as interim head coach for the season. The same year, Larry Brown became the first Redskins player to win the NFL rushing title after recording 1,125 yards (1,029 m).

=== George Allen era (1971–1977) ===
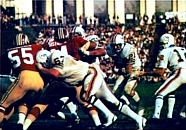
The Redskins playing against the Dolphins in Super Bowl VII.

After the death of Lombardi and Austin's successful 1970 season, Williams signed former Los Angeles Rams head coach George Allen as head coach on January 6, 1971. Partial to seasoned veterans instead of highly touted young players, Allen's teams became known as the Over-the-Hill Gang. "The future is now" was his slogan, and his players soon proved him right.

Allen and players Billy Kilmer, running back Larry Brown, center Len Hauss, receiver Charley Taylor, linebacker Chris Hanburger and safety Pat Fischer helped the Redskins make the playoffs for the first time since 1945 with a 9–4–1 mark. However, they lost in the Divisional Playoffs to the San Francisco 49ers, 24–20.

==== 1972 ====
The 1972 season began with the Redskins winning their first two games but then suffering an agonizing 24–23 loss to the New England Patriots. After the loss, Allen re-inserted Sonny Jurgensen as the starter, but Jurgensen's season ended three weeks later when he tore an Achilles tendon. Kilmer returned and led the Redskins to a 6–2 mark over the final eight weeks and an 11–3 overall record that brought an NFC East title.

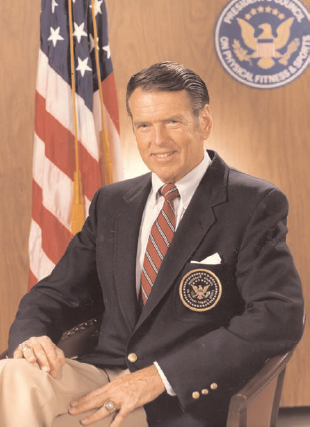
George Allen was the head coach of the Redskins from 1971 to 1977 and was elected into the Pro Football Hall of Fame in 2002.

The Redskins then hosted their first post-season game in Washington since 1942, where they beat the Green Bay Packers 16–3 in the NFC Divisional Playoffs, as the shrewd Allen resorted to a five-man defensive front that handcuffed the Packers' powerful running game. The Redskins reached the NFC Championship Game, defeating Dallas 26–3, only to lose to the undefeated Miami Dolphins 14–7 in Super Bowl VII.

The Redskins posted a 10–4 record in 1973, which made them tied with the Dallas Cowboys atop the NFC East. However, Dallas won the division crown based on better point differential with a net 13 points, which forced the Redskins to play in the Divisional playoffs at Minnesota one week later, where Washington lost 27–20.

=== 1974–1978 ===
The 1974 season ended quite similarly to the 1973 season. The Redskins finished 10–4 and again, were forced to play in the Divisional playoffs. This time, they played against the Los Angeles Rams, and again fell short, 19–10. Then before the beginning of the next season, on May 1, 1975, Sonny Jurgensen retired from pro football after 18 seasons in the NFL, 11 of which were for the Redskins.

When the 1975 season was over, the Redskins had an 8–6 record and did not make the playoffs for the first time since Allen's tenure began. The highlight of the year came during the season finale on December 21, 1975, against the Philadelphia Eagles, when Charley Taylor became the NFL's all-time receptions leader with his 634th career catch.

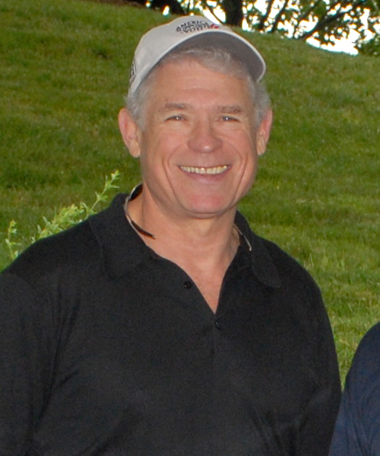
John Riggins, running back for the Redskins between 1976 and 1985, was inducted into the Hall of Fame in 1992.

The 1976 season started with the Redskins going 6–4, but won the final four games to finish at 10–4 and earned a playoff berth for the fifth time in six years under George Allen. However, on December 18, 1976, the Vikings beat the Redskins in the Divisional playoffs, 35–20.

After his Redskins failed to make the playoffs despite posting a 9–5 record in 1977, Allen was fired and was replaced by new head coach Jack Pardee, a star linebacker under Allen in Los Angeles and Washington. In his first year, his team started 6–0 but then lost 8 of their last 10 games to finish 8–8, being the only team until the 2003 Minnesota Vikings to start 6–0 and miss the playoffs.

== Jack Kent Cooke ownership (1979–1999) ==
Canadian-American businessman Jack Kent Cooke, who had owned minority shares in the team since 1961, purchased majority interest from Edward Bennett Williams in 1974. Due to NFL rules at the time disallowing controlling ownership in other leagues, he allowed Williams to operate the team until selling his other properties, the NBA's Los Angeles Lakers and the NHL's Los Angeles Kings, to Jerry Buss in May 1979. Cooke became the team's sole owner in 1985 after purchasing the remaining shares from Williams for around $9 million.

=== Pardee era (1978–1980) ===
Head Coach Jack Pardee would start the 1978 season 6–0. It was the first time the Redskins had won the first six games in thirty-eight years. However, the team would collapse to finish 8-8 due to injuries and lack of depth. They opened the 1979 season 6–2 and were 10–5 heading into the season finale at Dallas, against whom a win would assure a playoff spot and a possible NFC East title. Washington led 34–28 with time running out, but quarterback Roger Staubach then led the Cowboys in a fourth-quarter comeback with two touchdown passes. The 35–34 loss knocked the 10–6 Redskins out of playoff contention. Pardee's quick success with the team did not go unnoticed, however, and he was named Associated Press Coach of the Year and UPI NFC Coach of the Year. Future Pro Football Hall of Fame receiver Art Monk was selected in the first round of the draft. Pardee was fired after posting a 6–10 record in 1980.

=== Joe Gibbs era (1981–1992) ===
==== 1981 ====
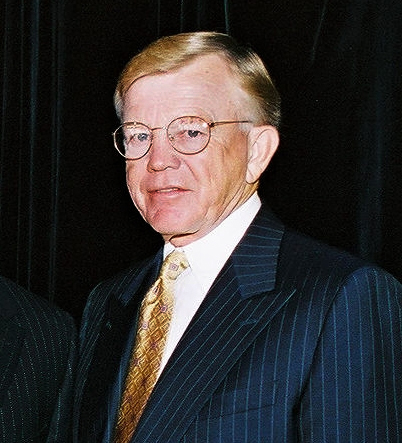
Joe Gibbs was the head coach of the Redskins from 1981 to 1992 and, again from 2004 to 2007. He was elected into the Pro Football Hall of Fame in 1996.

On January 13, 1981, owner Jack Kent Cooke signed the offensive coordinator of the San Diego Chargers, Joe Gibbs, as their head coach. Also during the off-season, the Redskins acquired Mark May, Russ Grimm, and Dexter Manley in the 1981 NFL draft, all of whom became significant contributors to the team for the next few years. After starting the 1981 season 0–5, the Redskins won eight out of their next eleven games and finished the season 8–8.

==== 1982 ====
The 1982 season started with two road wins and high hopes in Washington. Then starting on September 21, 1982, the NFL faced a 57-day-long players' strike, which reduced the 1982 season from a 16 games per team to nine. Because of the shortened season, the NFL adopted a special 16-team playoff tournament, in which eight teams from each conference were seeded 1–8 based on their regular season records. After the strike was settled, the Redskins dominated, winning six out of the seven remaining games to make the playoffs for the first time since 1976. Mark Moseley also got some attention on December 19, 1982, when he kicked his 21st consecutive field goal against the Giants, breaking Garo Yepremian's NFL record of 20.

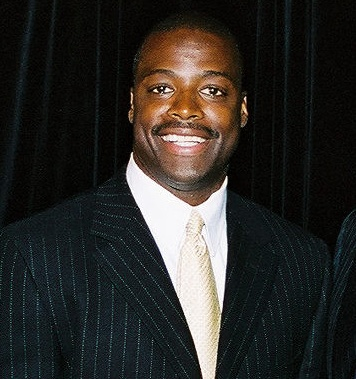
Darrell Green, cornerback for the Redskins between 1983 and 2002, was inducted into the Hall of Fame in 2008.

During 1982, players like quarterback Joe Theismann, running back John Riggins, and receiver Art Monk got most of the publicity, but the Redskins were one of the few teams ever to have a famous offensive line. Line coach Joe Bugel, who later went on to be the head coach of the Phoenix Cardinals, nicknamed them "The Hogs", not because they were big and fat, but because they would "root around in the mud" on the field. Among the regular Hogs were center Jeff Bostic, guards Raleigh McKenzie and Russ Grimm, and tackles Joe Jacoby, Mark May and Jim Lachey. Tight ends Don Warren and Clint Didier, as well as Riggins, were known as "Honorary Hogs." Also during the early 1980s, the Redskins had a group of wide receivers and tight ends called the Fun Bunch, who were known for their choreographed group celebrations in the end zone (usually a group high-five) following a touchdown. The members included wide receivers Monk, Virgil Seay, Charlie Brown, and Alvin Garrett, and tight ends Rick Walker, and Don Warren. Every single one of these players won a Super Bowl with the Redskins, and three were chosen for the Pro Bowl. The Fun Bunch's actions eventually resulted in a league-wide ban of "excessive celebration" in 1984. The 1980s Redskins had another group of wide receivers with a nickname: "The Smurfs", which consisted of Gary Clark, Alvin Garrett, and Charlie Brown. The three were given this nickname because of their diminutive size (Garrett was 5'7", Clark was 5'9", and Brown the tallest at 5'10"), comparing them to the tiny blue comic and cartoon characters in The Smurfs.

On January 15, 1983, during the second round of the playoffs against the Minnesota Vikings, Riggins rushed for a Redskins playoff record 185 yards (169 m), leading Washington to a 21–7 win and a place in the NFC Championship Game against Dallas, whom they beat 31–17. The Redskins' first Super Bowl win, and their first NFL Championship in 40 years, was in Super Bowl XVII, where the Redskins defeated the Miami Dolphins 27–17 on January 30, 1983. Riggins provided the game's signature play when, on 4th and inches, with the Redskins down 17–13, the coaches called "70 Chip" a play designed for short yardage. Riggins instead gained 43 yards (39 m) by running through would-be tackler Don McNeal and getting the go-ahead touchdown. The Redskins ended up winning by a 27–17 score.

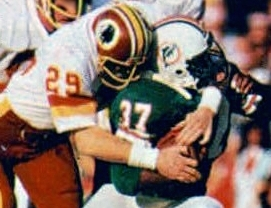
John Riggins (left) and Mark Murphy (right) made key offensive and defensive plays in Super Bowl XVII, respectively, to help the Redskins win their first Super Bowl.

"When the Hogs came into existence, you had Mark May, who was 300 pounds.
You had Joe Jacoby, who, depending on which meal he'd eaten,
could be 320 or 330 pounds. Then everybody went to big offensive linemen.
Subsequently, people had to start going to big defensive linemen."

— Matt Millen, on the size of the Hogs

==== 1983 ====
The 1983 season started off with a loss to the Dallas Cowboys 31–30 on the Monday Night Football season opener. The game also marked the rookie debut of Darrell Green, selected in the 1983 NFL draft along with Charles Mann, who played for 20 more seasons. They lost only one more time in the regular season, which was filled with extraordinary individual and team achievements. On October 1, 1983, the Redskins lost to the Green Bay Packers 48–47 in the highest scoring Monday Night Football game in history, in which both teams combined for more than 1,000 yards (910 m) of total offense. Then on November 20, 1983, Riggins set an NFL record by scoring a touchdown in his 12th consecutive game during a 42–20 win over the Los Angeles Rams. His streak ended at 13 consecutive games. Then during the regular-season finale on December 17, 1983, Moseley set an NFL scoring record with 161 points while Riggins' total of 144 points was second. This marked the first time since 1951 that the top two scorers in a season played on the same team. They dominated the NFL with a 14-win season which included scoring a then NFL record 541 points, many of which came from Riggins, who scored 24 touchdowns.

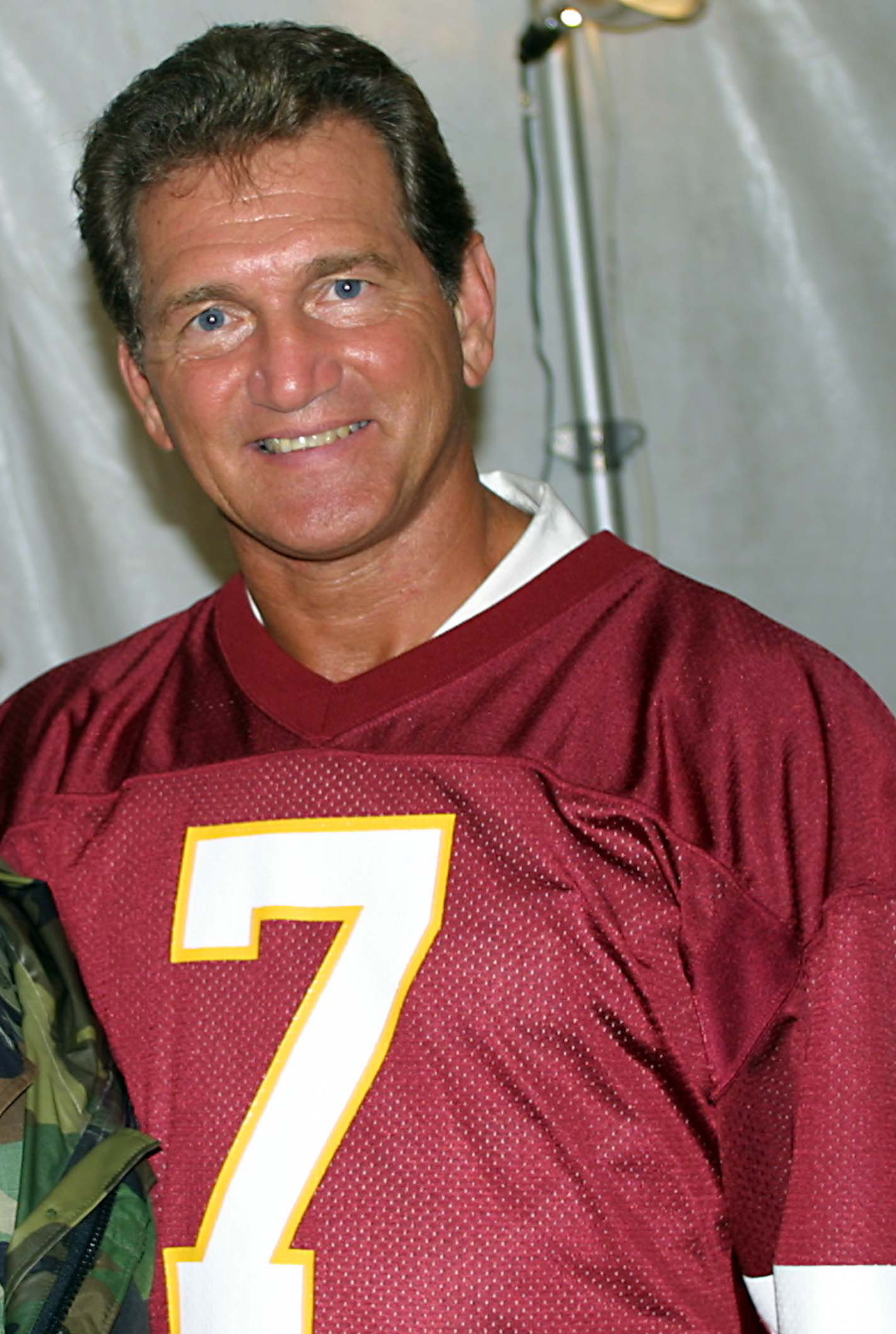
Joe Theismann, quarterback for the Redskins between 1974 and 1985, led the Redskins to a win in Super Bowl XVII and an appearance in Super Bowl XVIII.

In the postseason, the Redskins beat the Los Angeles Rams 51–7. The next week, Washington beat the San Francisco 49ers 24–21. It was their final win of the season because two weeks later, the Los Angeles Raiders beat the Redskins 38–9 in Super Bowl XVIII.

==== 1984 ====
During the offseason, the Redskins signed future standout Gary Clark in the second round of the 1984 NFL Supplemental Draft. The Redskins finished the 1984 season with an 11–5 record, and won the NFC East for the third consecutive season. However, they lost in the divisional round of the playoffs to the Chicago Bears, 23–19.

==== 1985 ====
The 1985 season was disappointing to the franchise. Week 1 opened as usual with a trip to Texas Stadium. The game proved a disaster as Joe Theismann threw five interceptions and was taunted by Cowboys fans singing "Happy Birthday" en route to a 44–14 loss. On November 18, while playing against the Giants, Theismann suffered a comminuted compound fracture to his tibia and fibula during a sack by Lawrence Taylor. The compound fracture forced him to retire after a 12-year career, during which he became the Redskins' all-time leader in pass attempts and completions. Though the Redskins finished the season with a 10–6 record, they finished only third in the NFC East and failed to make the playoffs for only the second time in Gibbs' tenure.

==== 1986 ====
The 1986 offseason's major highlight occurred during the 1986 NFL draft, when the Redskins picked up future Super Bowl MVP Mark Rypien in the sixth round.

In 1986, the road to the playoffs was even harder, with the Redskins making the postseason as a wild-card team despite having a regular season record of 12–4. They won the Wild Card playoff against the Rams, and then again in the Divisional playoffs against the Bears. This game was Gibbs 70th career victory, which made him the winningest head coach in Redskins history. The season ended next week, however, when the Redskins lost to the Giants 17–0 in the NFC Championship game. As the Cowboys sank into irrelevance during the second half of the '80s, New York would become Washington's main rival in the NFC East.

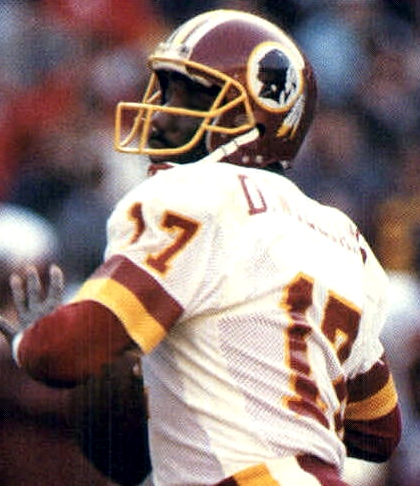
On January 31, 1988 Doug Williams became the first African-American QB to win a Super Bowl by defeating the Denver Broncos 42–10 in Super Bowl XXII. Williams completed 9 of 11 passes for 228 yards and 4 touchdowns in the second quarter alone.

==== 1987 ====
The 1987 season began with a 24-day players' strike, reducing the 16-game season to 15. The games for weeks 4–6 were won with all replacement players. The Redskins have the distinction of being the only team with no players crossing the picket line. Those three victories are often credited with getting the team into the playoffs and the basis for the 2000 movie The Replacements. The Redskins won their second championship in Super Bowl XXII on January 31, 1988, in San Diego, California. The Redskins routed the Denver Broncos 42–10 after starting the game in a 10–0 deficit, the largest come-from-behind victory in Super Bowl history at that time. This game is more famous for the stellar performance by quarterback Doug Williams who endured a hyper extended knee injury and passed for four touchdowns in the second quarter en route to becoming the first African-American quarterback to lead his team to a Super Bowl victory. Rookie running back Timmy Smith had a great performance as well, running for a Super Bowl record 204 yards (187 m).

==== 1988–1990 ====
The following two seasons, the Redskins did not live up to the expectations of a former Super Bowl team by not making the playoffs in either the 1988 or 1989 seasons. One bright note that came from 1989, however, when Gerald Riggs set the Redskins' all-time single-game rushing record with a 221-yard (202 m) performance in a 42–37 loss to the Philadelphia Eagles. The Redskins returned to the playoffs in 1990 as a Wild Card team, but lost in the Divisional playoffs to the 49ers, 28–10.

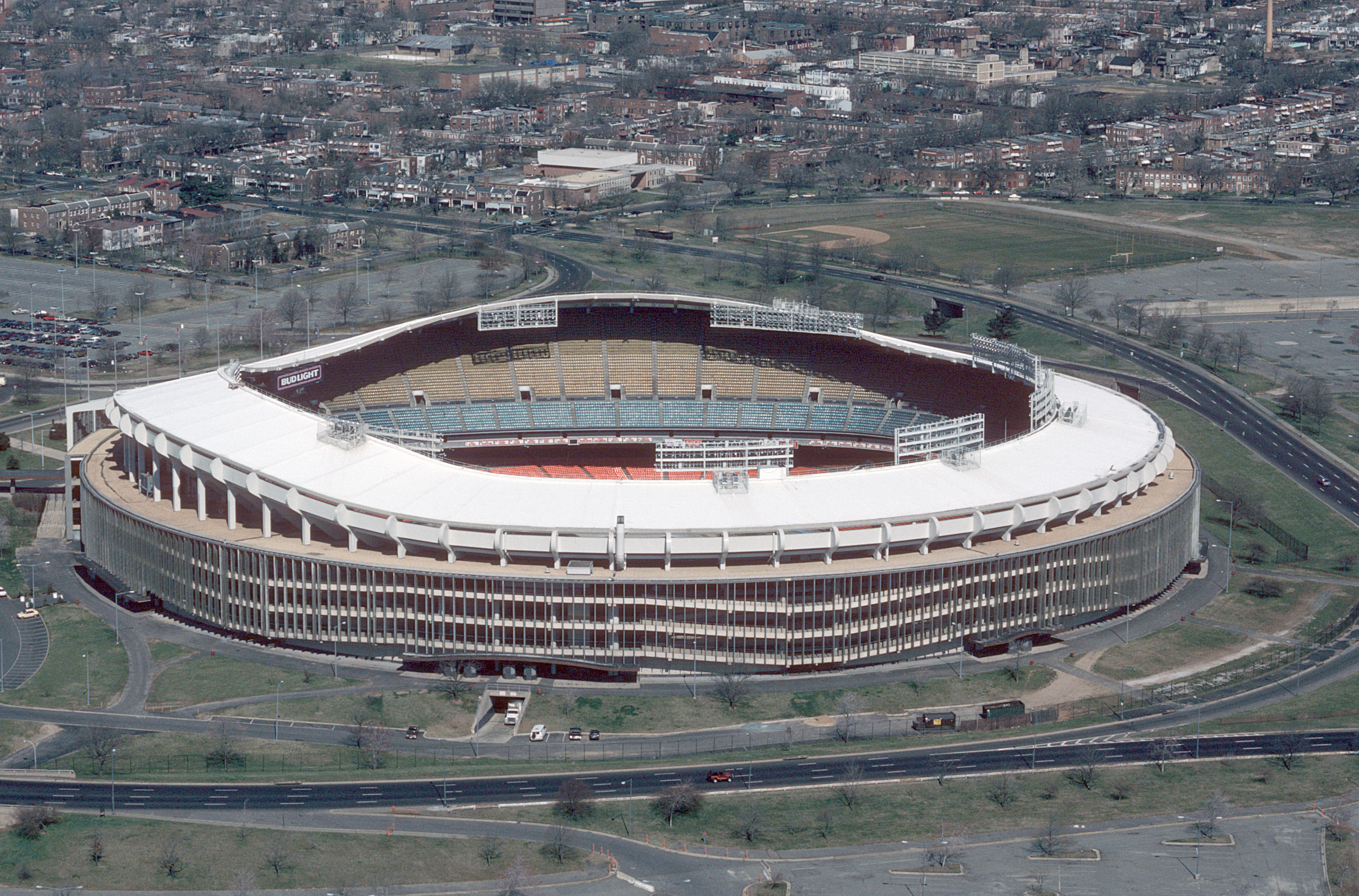
RFK Stadium was the home of the Redskins from 1961 to 1996.

==== 1991 ====
The 1991 season started with a franchise-record 11 straight victories. Also during the season, the Hogs allowed a league low and club record nine sacks – the third lowest total in NFL history. After posting a 14–2 record, the Redskins made and dominated the playoffs, beating the Falcons and Lions by a combined score of 64–17. On January 26, 1992, the Redskins won Super Bowl XXVI by defeating the Buffalo Bills 37–24. After the Super Bowl, the Redskins set another club record by sending eight players to the Pro Bowl. Helping the Redskins accomplish this achievement was a trio of wide receivers known as the Posse: Art Monk, Gary Clark, and Ricky Sanders. The trio averaged 210 catches for 3,043 yards (2,783 m) per season in the late 1980s and early 1990s. Super Bowl XXVI showcased the receivers' talents, with Clark recording seven catches for 114 yards (104 m) and a touchdown and Monk with seven catches for 113 yards (103 m).

==== 1992 ====
The Redskins in 1992 came close, but failed to equal their success of the previous season. They finished with a record of 9–7 and earned a trip to the playoffs as a Wild Card team, but lost in the Divisional playoffs to the 49ers, 20–13. The most impressive feat during the season occurred on October 12, 1992, when Art Monk became the NFL's all-time leading pass receiver against the Denver Broncos on Monday Night Football by catching his 820th career reception.

The era ended on March 5, 1993, when Joe Gibbs retired after 12 years of coaching with the Redskins. In what proved to be a temporary retirement, Gibbs pursued an interest in NASCAR by founding Joe Gibbs Racing.

=== Gibbs retirement (1993) ===
After the end of Gibbs' first tenure, the Redskins hired former player Richie Petitbon for the 1993 season. However, his first and only year as head coach, the Redskins finished with a record of 4–12. Petitbon was fired at the end of the season and on February 2, 1994, Norv Turner was hired as head coach after being the offensive coordinator of the Dallas Cowboys.

Of the starters from Super Bowl XXVI, the team entered the season having lost Gary Clark, Fred Stokes, Wilber Marshall, and Martin Mayhew through free agency; Don Warren, meanwhile, retired after 1992. And the defections through free agency or retirement did not end there: the team lost Ron Middleton, Art Monk, Charles Mann, Eric Williams, Earnest Byner, Andre Collins, Danny Copeland, Ricky Sanders, and Brad Edwards to free agency by the start of training camp in 1994. Meanwhile, Jeff Bostic, Kelly Goodburn, and Joe Jacoby retired following the 1993 season.

=== Norv Turner era (1994–2000) ===
Turner's first two years as head coach were unimpressive, going 9–23 during the 1994 and 1995 season. One individual achievement that happened during these season occurred on October 9, 1994, when linebacker Monte Coleman played in his 206th career game with the Redskins, which broke Art Monk's team record for games played (Coleman retired at season's end with 216 games played). The team finished 3–13 in 1994, which was the last for Chip Lohmiller, Kurt Gouveia, Raleigh McKenzie, and Mark Schlereth, all of whom left the team via free agency.

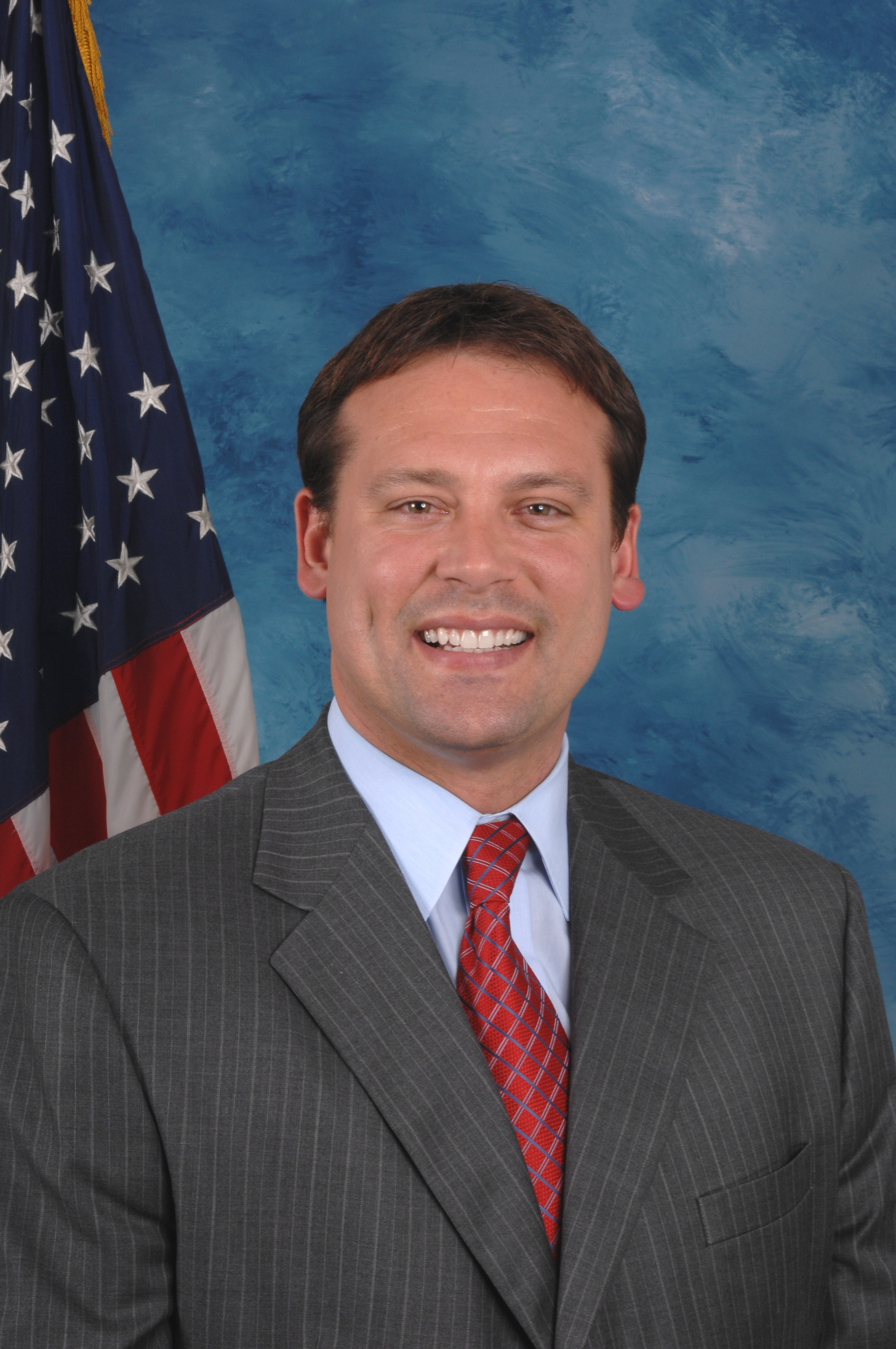
Heath Shuler, quarterback for the Redskins between 1994 and 1995, is a former 3-term member in the United States House of Representatives.

The team did see modest improvement in 1995, which was the last for pass rusher Tim Johnson, who left for Cincinnati at season's end; and Jim Lachay, who retired after 1995. The highlight of the season was arguably a season sweep over the hated Cowboys, including a shocking 24–17 upset in week 14 at Irving.

By 1996, and of the 25 players starting for Washington (including kicker Chip Lohmiller and punter Kelly Goodburn) in Super Bowl XXVI, only running back/kick returner Brian Mitchell and cornerback Darrell Green had remained with the team continuously since then. Salary cap problems gutted the Redskins; the attrition through free agency and retirements mentioned above was devastating, to say nothing of attrition of backups from the 1991 Redskins (e.g., backup quarterback Jeff Rutledge retired following the 1992 season, longtime offensive lineman Russ Grimm retired after Super Bowl XXVI, linebacker Monte Coleman retired after 1994. Meanwhile, then-third-string quarterback Stan Humphries was traded to San Diego in training camp in 1992.)

In hope of inspiring the team, on March 13, 1996, Redskins owner Jack Kent Cooke, Maryland Governor Parris Glendening, and Prince George's County executive Wayne K. Curry signed a contract that paved the way for the immediate start of construction for the new home of the Redskins (now Northwest Stadium). The 1996 season was an improvement, with the Redskins going 9–7, but they were still unable to make the playoffs. However, in December 1996, two important events occurred. On December 16, 1996, the Redskins played their final game at Robert F. Kennedy Memorial Stadium against the Dallas Cowboys. The Redskins defeated the Cowboys 37–10, finished their tenure at the stadium with a 173–102–3 record, including 11–1 in the playoffs. The second achievement was on December 22, 1996, when Terry Allen rushed past Riggins' single-season rushing record, gaining 1,353 yards (1,237 m). He also led the NFL with 21 touchdowns.

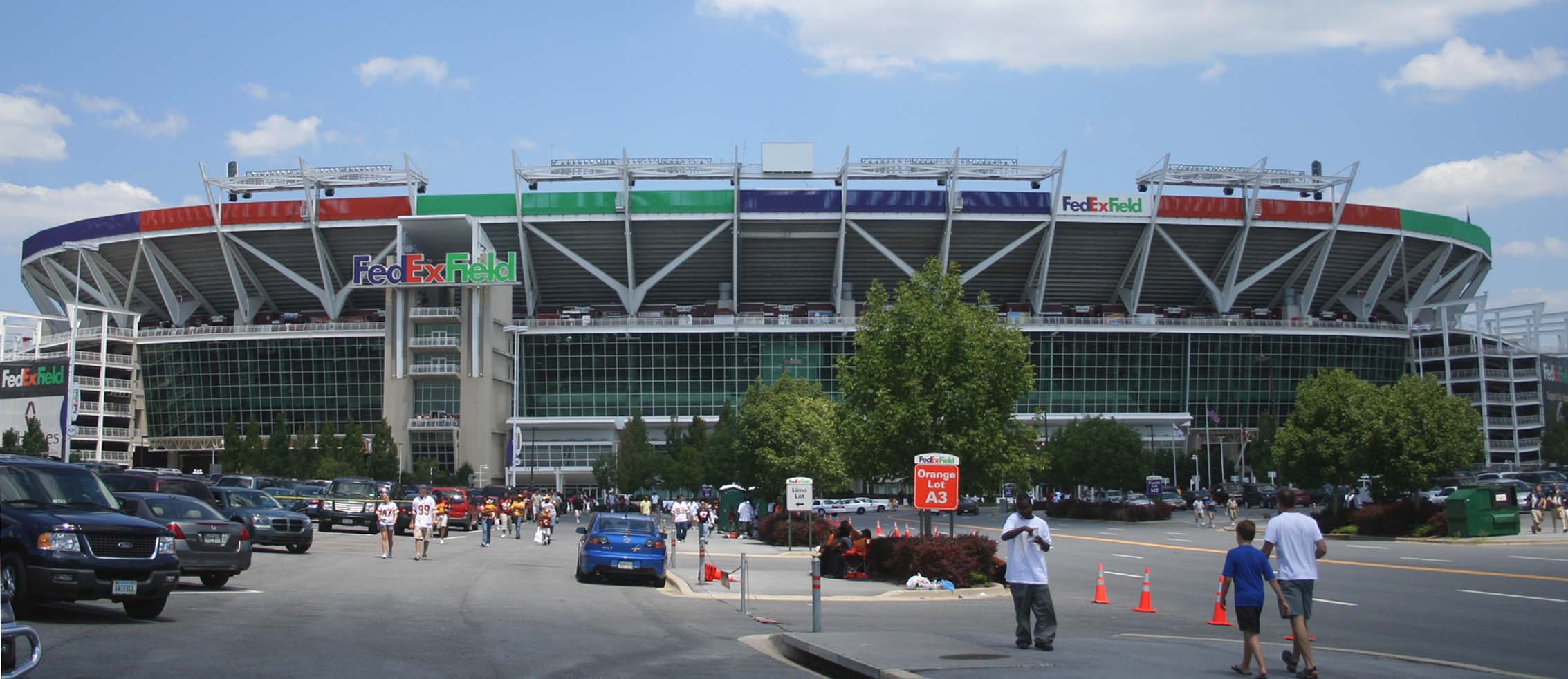
Northwest Stadium (formerly FedEx Field) has been the home of the Commanders since 1997.

On April 6, 1997, Redskins owner Jack Kent Cooke died of congestive heart failure at the age of 84. In his will, Cooke left the Redskins to the Jack Kent Cooke Foundation, with instructions that the foundation sell the team. His estate, headed by son John Kent Cooke, took over ownership of the Redskins and at his memorial service, John Kent Cooke announced that the new stadium in Landover, Maryland will be named Jack Kent Cooke Stadium. Also during the 1997 offseason, two Redskins players became the focus of media attention when Michael Westbrook, 1995 first-round draft pick, punched Stephen Davis, an incident caught by local TV news cameras. The Redskins fined Westbrook $50,000. On September 14, 1997, the Redskins played in their new stadium for the first time, and beat the Arizona Cardinals, 19–13 in overtime. On November 23, 1997, they played the New York Giants and the result was a 7–7 tie, the Redskins first tie game since the 1971 season. The result was an 8–7–1 record, and the Redskins missed the playoffs for a fifth season in a row. One bright spot during the season, however, occurred on December 13, 1997, when Darrell Green played in his 217th career game as a Redskin, breaking Monte Coleman's record for games played.

The 1998 season started with a seven-game losing streak, and the Redskins finished with a 6–10 record, their first losing record in two seasons. On December 27, 1998, however, Brian Mitchell finished the season leading the NFL in total combined net yards for the fourth time. By doing so, he joined Jim Brown as the only players in league history to lead the league in the category four times.

== Daniel Snyder ownership (1999–2023) ==
=== 1999 ===
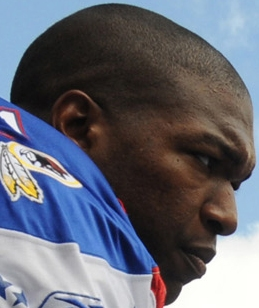
Chris Samuels, seen here at the 2008 Pro Bowl, was the starting offensive tackle for the Redskins from 2000 to 2009

After two seasons, John Kent Cooke eventually sold the franchise to Daniel Snyder for $800 million, a deal that was the most expensive team-purchasing deal in sporting history. The sale was finalized with the Cooke family on July 13, 1999. One of his first acts as team owner was to fire 25 front office employees two days later. On November 21, 1999, he sold the naming-rights to Jack Kent Cooke Stadium to the highest bidder, FedEx, who renamed the stadium FedExField.

In Snyder's abbreviated first season as owner, the Redskins went 10–6, including a four-game winning streak early in the season, and made it to the playoffs for the first time in Norv Turner's career, and the first time for the Redskins since 1992. One of the most important games of the regular season occurred on December 26, 1999, when the Redskins overcame a 10-point fourth quarter deficit to defeat the San Francisco 49ers 26–20, to give the Redskins their first NFC East crown since 1991. The final game of the season, on January 2, 2000, against the Dolphins, running back Stephen Davis rushed for a club-record 1,405 yards (1,285 m) and quarterback Brad Johnson completed a club-record 316 passes and threw for more than 4,000 yards (3,700 m). They then beat the Detroit Lions in the first round of the playoffs, but lost to the Buccaneers, 14–13. The Redskins had a chance to win the game with a 52-yard (48 m) field goal attempt in the final seconds of the game, but the snap from center Dan Turk to Brad Johnson, the holder, was off and the Bucs won. This was Dan Turk's last game in the NFL, as he died later that year of cancer.

=== 2000 ===
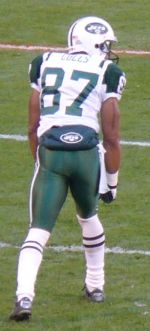
Laveranues Coles, seen here with the New York Jets, was a wide receiver for the Redskins from 2003 to 2004.

The 2000 season started with the selection of future Pro Bowlers LaVar Arrington and Chris Samuels in the 2000 NFL draft and included five consecutive wins in the first half of the season. However, they ended up going 7–6 through 14 weeks (counting their bye-week), and on December 4, 2000, Norv Turner was fired after almost seven seasons as head coach. Terry Robiskie was named interim coach to finish out the season, which ended with an 8–8 record. During the final game of the season on December 24, 2000, Larry Centers became the NFL's all-time leader in catches by a running back with 685 receptions.

=== Marty Schottenheimer era (2001) ===
On January 3, 2001, the Redskins hired former Browns and Chiefs head coach Marty Schottenheimer as the 24th Redskins head coach. The 2001 season began with a loss to the San Diego Chargers, 30–3. On September 13, 2001, after the September 11 attacks, the Redskins announced the establishment of the Redskins Relief Fund to help families of the victims of the attack at the Pentagon. During the course of the season, the Redskins raised more than $700,000. In light of the attacks, the NFL rescheduled the game from the weekend of September 16 and 17 to the weekend of January 6 and 7.

The rest of the Redskins' season was filled with highs and lows. They started 0–5, but then went on to win five consecutive games, to bring their record to 5–5. Despite the turnaround, they finished the season with an 8–8 record. However, on January 6, 2002, Stephen Davis became the first Redskin in team history to rush for 1,000-plus yards for three consecutive seasons. He finished the 2001 campaign with 1,432 yards (1,309 m) on 356 carries, which were both franchise single-season records.

=== Steve Spurrier era (2002–2003) ===
==== 2002 ====
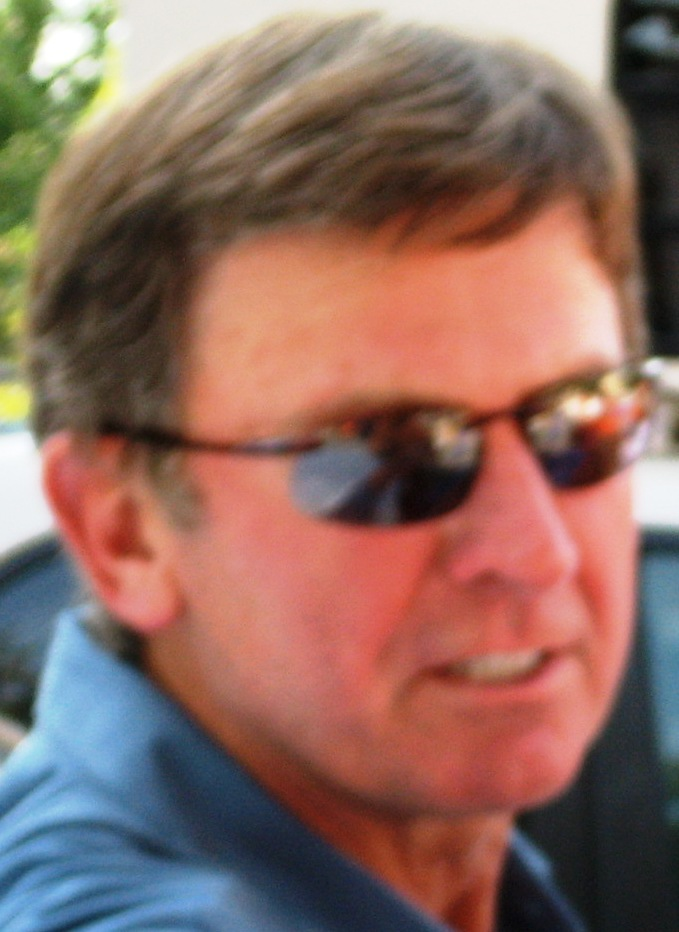
Steve Spurrier was the head coach of the Redskins from 2002 to 2003.

On January 14, 2002, Snyder hired former Heisman winner and University of Florida coach Steve Spurrier, the Redskins' fifth new head coach in ten years. During the offseason, he acquired Heisman winner Danny Wuerffel and Shane Matthews, who were both quarterbacks under Spurrier at Florida. He continued signing Florida players during his tenure with the Redskins, including using the Redskins' second-round draft pick during the 2003 NFL draft to select Taylor Jacobs, a wide receiver who was largely considered a bust for the Redskins. Spurrier made his Redskins pre-season debut on August 3, 2002, against the 49ers in the 2002 American Bowl in Osaka, Japan, where the Redskins won 38–7. However, it did not go as well in the regular season, and they finished with a 7–9 record, their first losing season since 1998. A bittersweet moment during the season occurred on December 29, 2002, when Darrell Green concluded his 20th and final season as the Redskins defeated the Cowboys 20–14 at FedExField. During his twenty seasons, he set an NFL record for consecutive seasons with at least one interception (19) and a Redskins team record for regular season games played (295) and started (258).

==== 2003 ====
Hoping for a turnaround from the year before, the Redskins started the 2003 season on September 4, 2003, when they hosted the NFL kickoff game at FedExField, defeating the Jets 16–13, thanks to a last-minute field goal by ex-Jets kicker John Hall. The week's festivities included a concert on the National Mall before the game with special guests, Britney Spears, Aerosmith, Mary J. Blige, and Aretha Franklin, who concluded the concert by singing the national anthem from the Mall leading up to kickoff. Despite such a spectacular beginning to the season, the Redskins finished with a 5–11 record, their worst since 1994. The one bright note of the season was on December 7, 2003, when defensive end Bruce Smith sacked Giants quarterback Jesse Palmer in the fourth quarter. With his 199th career sack, broke Reggie White's all-time NFL mark (Smith finished the season with 200 career sacks). After two mediocre years, Spurrier resigned after the 2003 season with three years left on his contract.

=== Return of Joe Gibbs (2004–2007) ===
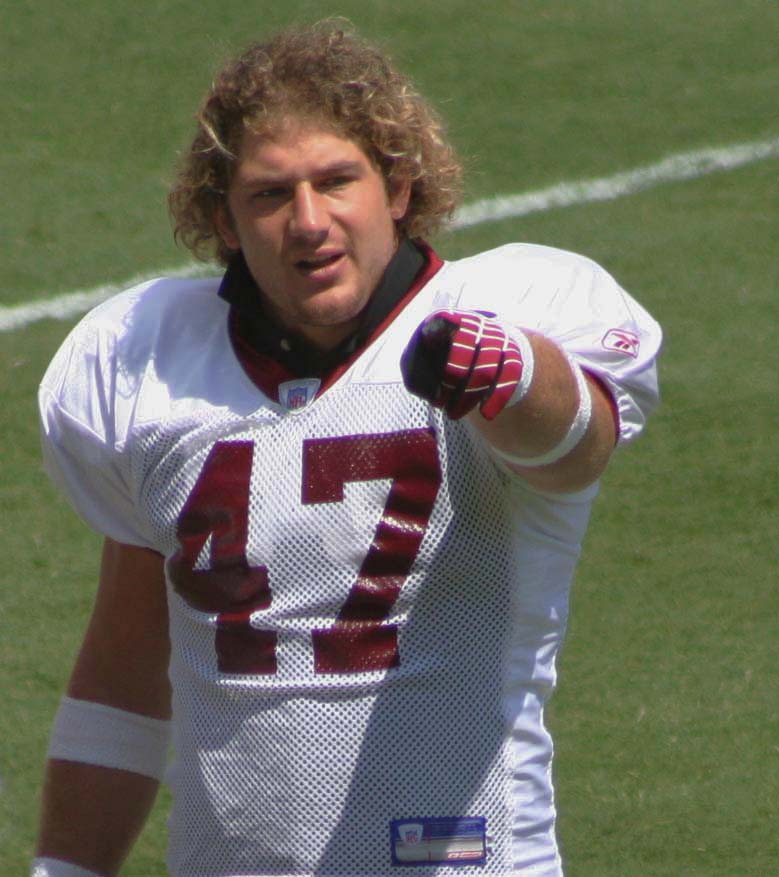
Chris Cooley is a former tight end for the Redskins and current Washington radio personality.

The 2004 off-season began with three major changes. The first came on January 7, 2004, when Snyder successfully lured former coach Joe Gibbs away from NASCAR to return as head coach and team president. Snyder also expanded FedExField to a league-high capacity of 91,665 seats. The final big change in the off-season occurred on March 3, 2004, when the Redskins agreed to a trade with the Broncos, sending cornerback Champ Bailey and a second-round draft choice to Denver for running back Clinton Portis.

==== 2004 ====
The 2004 season started on a high note on September 12, 2004, during Gibbs' first game back as head coach, when the Redskins defeated the Buccaneers 16–10. The win was the 500th regular season win in franchise history. It was also Gibbs' 125th regular season win as Redskins head coach, making him responsible for a full one-quarter of the franchise's 500 wins. However, Gibbs' return to the franchise did not pay instant dividends as the Redskins finished the season with a 6–10 record.

Despite an impressive defense, the team struggled offensively. Newly acquired quarterback Mark Brunell struggled during the season, and was replaced midway by backup Patrick Ramsey. However, some of Gibbs' other new signings, such as cornerback Shawn Springs and linebacker Marcus Washington did very well. The Redskins also picked Sean Taylor and Chris Cooley during the 2004 NFL draft, who both quickly emerged as talented players.

The Redskins made only one major move at the beginning the 2005 off-season, acquiring wide receiver Santana Moss from the New York Jets for Laveranues Coles. Other signings included center Casey Rabach and wide receiver David Patten. The Redskins made their biggest off-season moves at the 2005 NFL draft, where they drafted cornerback Carlos Rogers in the first round, from Auburn. The team then traded away multiple picks to select again in the first round, with which they drafted quarterback Jason Campbell, also from Auburn. The team also added to the coaching roster with the hiring of former Jacksonville Jaguars offensive coordinator Bill Musgrave as the quarterbacks coach. Having coached quarterback Mark Brunell when they both were in Jacksonville, they quickly formed a rapport. Musgrave's input allowed the Redskins to use the shotgun formation, a first under Gibbs.

==== 2005 ====
During the 2005 offseason, the Redskins traded back wide receiver Laveranues Coles to the New York Jets and acquired wide receiver Santana Moss in return. The Redskins used their first pick of the 2005 NFL Draft on Auburn University cornerback Carlos Rogers. The Redskins used their next first round draft pick (acquired from the Denver Broncos) on Auburn quarterback Jason Campbell. The rest of their picks included UCLA fullback Manuel White Jr., Louisville linebacker Robert McCune, Stanford linebacker Jared Newberry, and Citadel College fullback Nehemiah Broughton.

Hoping to improve on the previous season's dismal passing attack, Coach Gibbs added former Jacksonville Jaguars offensive coordinator Bill Musgrave as his quarterbacks coach. For the first time under Gibbs, the Redskins offense used the shotgun formation.

The team won its first three games, including a Monday Night Football victory over Dallas. The Monday Night Football game would go down as one of the greatest comebacks in Redskins history. Trailing 13–0 with 3:46 left in the game and facing a 4th down with 15 yards to go at the Dallas 39-yard line, quarterback Mark Brunell hit wide receiver Santana Moss in the end zone with a pass to cut the lead to 13–7 after the extra point. After Dallas would go three and out on their next possession, The Redskins got the ball back at their 30-yard line. On the next play, Mark Brunell hit Santana Moss again and he went untouched into the endzone for their second touchdown, a 70-yard bomb. The Redskins led 14–13 and held off Dallas' last drive to preserve the come-from-behind win.

The Redskins then fell into a slump, including three straight losses in November, which lessened the chances of the team making the playoffs. However, five consecutive victories at the end of the season allowed Washington to finish the season at 10–6, qualifying for the playoffs as a wild card team. They opened the playoffs on the road against the NFC South champion Tampa Bay Buccaneers on Saturday, January 7, 2006. They won the rematch by a final score of 17–10, after taking an early 14–0 lead, which they later seemed to have squandered until replay evidence showed that an apparent touchdown that would have tied the game was in fact an incomplete pass. In that game, the Redskins broke the record for fewest offensive yards (120) gained in a playoff victory, with one of their two touchdowns being from a defensive run after a fumble recovery. The following weekend, they played the Seattle Seahawks, who had received a first-round bye. The Seahawks defeated the Redskins 20–10, ending the Redskins' hopes of reaching their first NFC Championship Game since 1991.

Three team records were broken during the 2005 season. Clinton Portis set the Redskins record for rushing yards in a season with 1,516 yards, breaking Stephen Davis's 2001 mark of 1,432 yards and Santana Moss' 1,483 receiving yards broke Bobby Mitchell's 1963 record of 1,436 yards. Chris Cooley's 71 receptions broke Jerry Smith's season record for a Redskins tight end.

==== 2006 ====
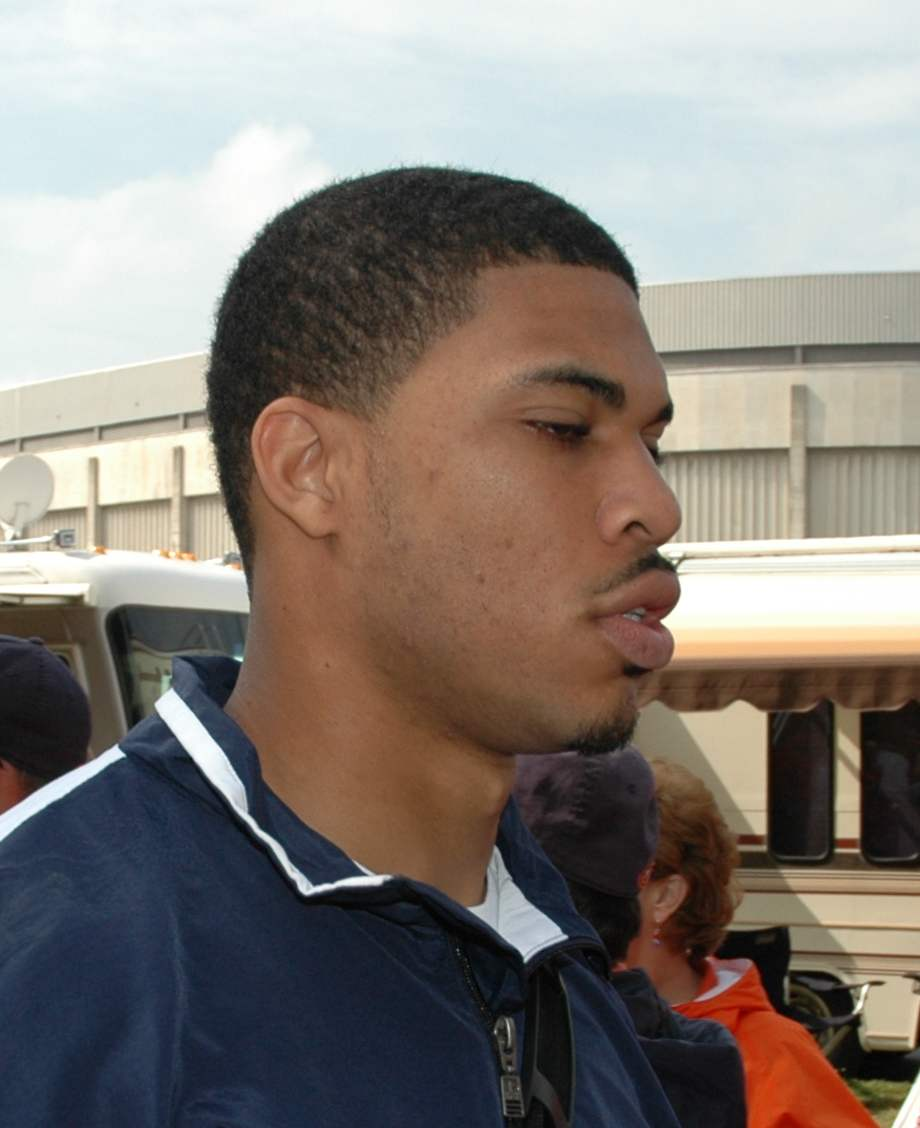
Jason Campbell became starting quarterback during the middle of the 2006 season.

The inconsistency of the offense during the 2005 season resulted in Gibbs hiring offensive coordinator Al Saunders as the associate head coach – offense. Saunders came from a similar background as Gibbs through being mentored under Don Coryell and was expected to make the offense become more efficient. Saunders would serve as the primary playcaller. Because of this, it was believed that Gibbs would have the role of head coach/CEO with the Redskins in 2006 and would largely deal with personnel matters, as well as having more time to focus on special teams and defense, while Saunders would supplement Gibbs with the offense. Gibbs also added former Buffalo Bills defensive coordinator Jerry Gray to his staff as Secondary/Cornerbacks Coach. Gibbs did lose quarterbacks coach Bill Musgrave to the Atlanta Falcons over the summer of 2006.

After bringing in new faces Brandon Lloyd, Antwaan Randle El, Adam Archuleta and Andre Carter with lucrative contracts and lucrative bonuses in the 2005–06 offseason, expectations for the Redskins were high. The expectations would in no way be met. The Redskins struggled every week to stay close in games and hold leads. The Redskins lost a close season-opener to the Minnesota Vikings 19–16. However, the season turned for the worse quickly. The Redskins played another primetime game the very next week against the hated rival Dallas Cowboys on Sunday Night football and fell flat on their face, losing 27–10. The Redskins seemed to turn it around after that, routing the Houston Texans 31–15 and quarterback Mark Brunell setting a then-NFL record by completing 22 consecutive passes. The Redskins then defeated the highly regarded Jacksonville Jaguars in overtime 36–30. However, this 2-game win streak would be the high point. The Redskins entered the next week favored over the slumping rival New York Giants and fell again, being demolished 19–3. The Redskins then hosted the winless Tennessee Titans at home, and lost 25–22, allowing Vince Young to win his first career start. After a loss to Indianapolis Colts, the Redskins returned home for a second jab at the Cowboys. The Redskins rallied to tie the game at 19–19. However, the Cowboys were on their way to victory and lined up for a 38-yard field-goal attempt by renowned kicker Mike Vanderjagt. When the kick went up, it was blocked by Troy Vincent and returned by Sean Taylor to the Cowboys 47-yard line as time expired, apparently sending the game to overtime, but a facemask on Dallas allowed newly signed kicker Nick Novak attempt a 49-yard field goal on an untimed down. He squeezed it through the uprights and the Redskins won the game 22–19. The next week, the Redskins traveled to Philadelphia to take on the rival Philadelphia Eagles and fell flat again, falling 27–3. After this, Joe Gibbs replaced Brunell with young quarterback Jason Campbell. The Redskins continued to lose games by close margins and blow late leads, winning only two of its final 7 games, and finishing the season 5–11, last in the NFC East.

Analysts differ on exactly why the 2006 season was such a failure. Some point to free agent signings such as strong safety Adam Archuleta and wide receiver Brandon Lloyd. Others point to the disconnect between the offensive philosophies of Gibbs and Saunders: Gibbs preferring a power-running scheme while Saunders desired an aggressive pass-oriented style. Many looked to the breakdowns in defensive coordinator Gregg Williams's system, while some point to specific player breakdowns in the porous secondary such as the struggles of defensive backs, allowing a league high 30 touchdown passes, and accumulating an NFL low 6 interceptions. The defense went from 7th overall in 2005 to 29th in 2006.

==== 2007, Sean Taylor's murder ====
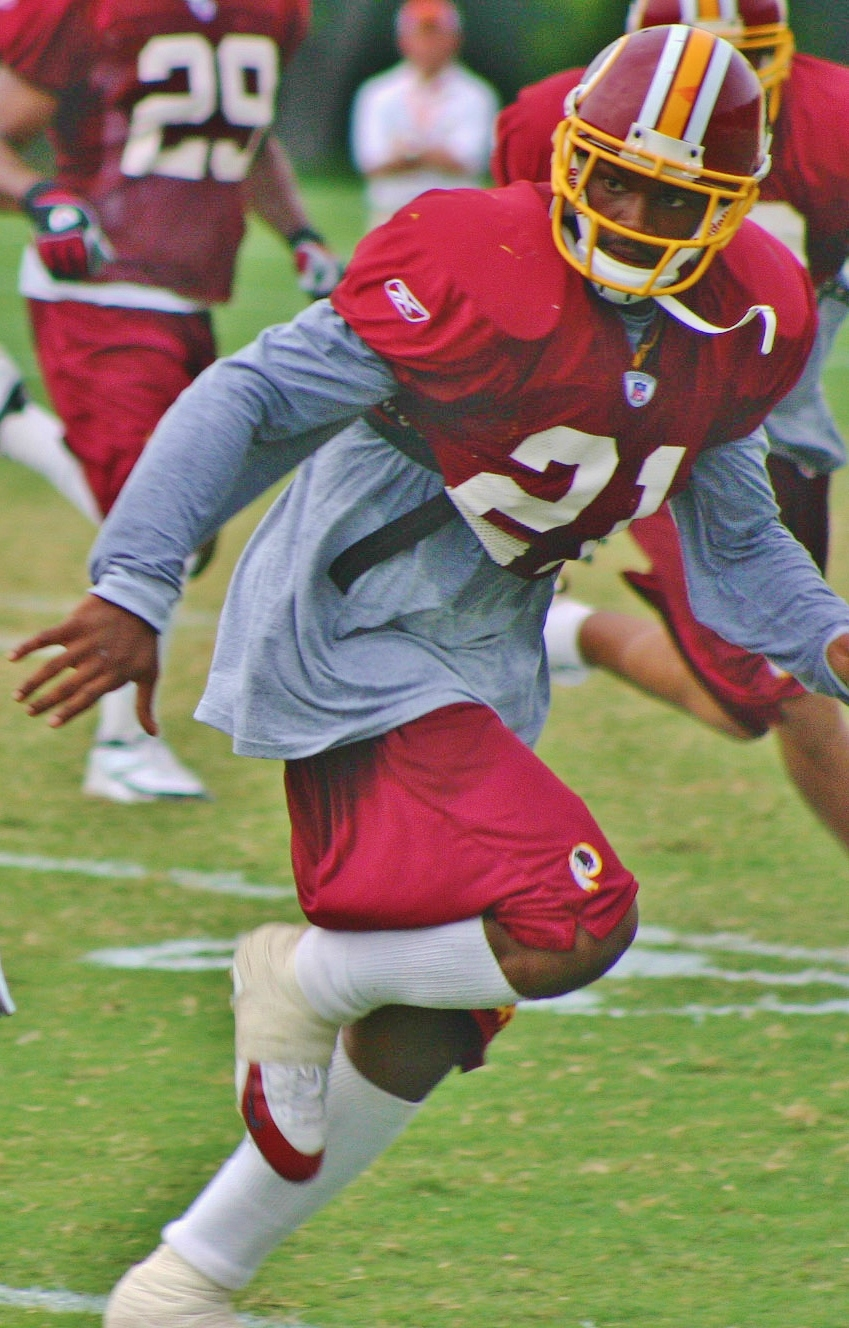
Sean Taylor, first-round draft pick in 2004, played safety for the Redskins until he was fatally shot in November 2007.

The 2007 season was one of the most emotional years the team and its fans have ever faced. The 2007 off-season started with the signing of linebacker London Fletcher and the return cornerback Fred Smoot, as well as the selection on LaRon Landry in the first round of the 2007 NFL draft. However, they lost Derrick Dockery, a major part of Washington's offensive line, to the Buffalo Bills during free agency.

The 2007 season began with the Redskins posting a 5–3 record through nine weeks. The following week the Redskins started a four-game losing streak that did not end until week 14. The first loss came against the Eagles, with a score of 33–25. Also lost during the game was Sean Taylor, who had to leave early with a knee injury. The Redskins lost the next two games to the Cowboys and Buccaneers. Though this was thought of as bad, the Redskins did not know just how bad it would get.

Two days after the Buccaneers game, on November 26, 2007, Sean Taylor was shot in the upper leg by an armed intruder at his Palmetto Bay, Florida home while he was resting an injury that had kept him sidelined for the previous two games, critically wounding him by severing his femoral artery. After undergoing surgery, Taylor remained unconscious and in a coma. On November 27, at 3:30 am, Taylor died at the hospital.

On November 30, 2007, law enforcement officials detained four people in the Fort Myers area for questioning in connection with Taylor's death. Later that night, a Miami-Dade police spokeswoman announced that the four men: Venjah Hunte, 20; Eric Rivera Jr., 17; Jason Mitchell, 19; and Charles Wardlow, 18; were arrested and charged with Taylor's murder. All four men were charged on December 1, 2007, with felony second-degree murder, armed burglary, and home invasion with a firearm or another deadly weapon. The charges could result in life imprisonment for the perpetrators.

The NFL recognized the death of Taylor by placing a black #21 sticker on the back of NFL players' helmets, as well as having a moment of silence before each game played that week. The Redskins had the number 21 painted on the field, a parking lot entrance and the Redskins Hall of Fame, all three of which became makeshift memorials. In addition to the #21 sticker on the back of every helmet, the Redskins wore it as a patch on player uniforms, warm-up shirts and coaching staff jackets, as well as unveiling a banner bearing his name and number. His locker at Redskin Park was encased in plexi-glass and left as Taylor left it. The organization also established a trust fund for Taylor's daughter, Jackie. At the University of Miami, a giant banner honoring Taylor and signed by students and alumni was displayed in the student union breezway, and a candlelight vigil was held on the campus in his honor the evening of December 2, 2007.

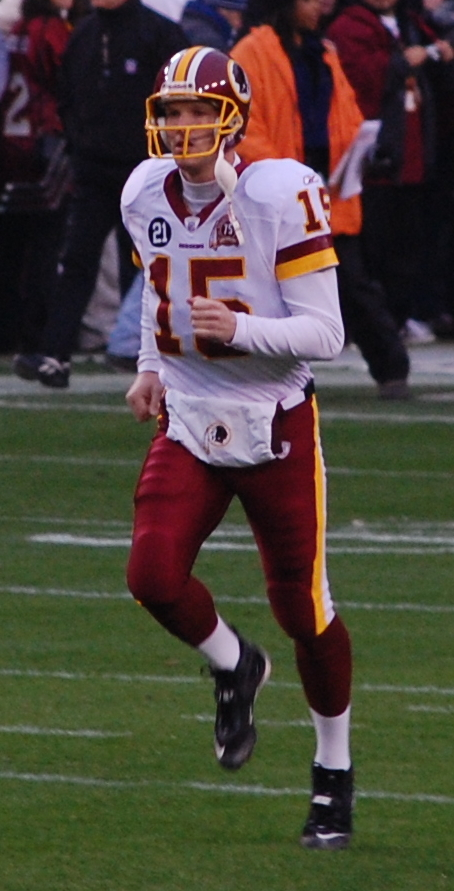
Todd Collins was the backup quarterback for the Redskins from 2006 to 2009.

Just five days after Taylor's death, the Redskins tried to snap their losing streak at home against the Buffalo Bills. Before the kickoff, the stadium held a memorial service for Taylor. For the team's first defensive play, the Redskins came out with only ten players on the field (as opposed to 11) to honor to Taylor. The game ended with the Bills getting into position to kick a game-winning 51-yard (47 m) field goal. The original field goal was good, however Gibbs called timeout right before the snap to "ice the kicker" (a common practice). However, when Buffalo tried to kick again, Gibbs again called timeout. A coach is not allowed to call two timeouts in a row without the ball being in play. This unintentional call got his team an unsportsmanlike conduct penalty, which not only moved the Bills 15 yards (14 m) closer to their end zone, but reduced Lindell's field goal attempt to 36 yards (33 m). Rian Lindell made the kick, and the Bills won 17–16. With their fourth-straight loss, Washington fell to 5–7.

On December 3, a day after the loss, the entire Redskins organization flew to Florida and attended Taylor's funeral, along with 4,000 other people, in the Pharmed Arena at Florida International University. Speakers at the funeral, which was nationally televised, included NFL Commissioner Roger Goodell, coach Gibbs, and former professional and collegiate teammates LaVar Arrington, Clinton Portis, and Buck Ortega. The Reverend Jesse Jackson and O. J. Simpson were also in attendance. Taylor was buried near his Palmetto Bay, Florida home.

Three days later, the Redskins played the Chicago Bears on a Thursday night, hoping to stop the losing-streak and to honor Taylor properly with a victory. The beginning of the game did not go as planned, with a scoreless first quarter and the loss of starter Jason Campbell, who left early in the second quarter with a dislocated knee. However, backup quarterback Todd Collins led the team to a 24–16 victory, thus ending the losing streak. Collins proved to be more than just a one-game solution, despite not having started a game in 10 years, and led the Redskins to three more straight victories to finish the season with a 9–7 record and secured a Wild Card spot in the players. They secured that playoff berth on December 30, 2007, with a 27–6 win over the Dallas Cowboys in front of a record-setting FedExField crowd. For many players, the Redskins' 21-point victory margin called to mind the late Taylor, who wore jersey No. 21.

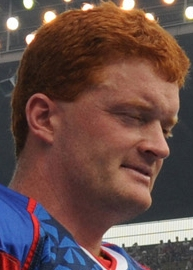
Ethan Albright was the Redskins long snapper from 2001 up to 2009.

The Redskins' season came to end a week later, with a loss in the Wild Card round of the playoffs against the Seahawks, 35–14. However, the season was not over for three players, Chris Cooley, Chris Samuels, and long snapper Ethan Albright, who were all named to the 2008 Pro Bowl. During the game, all three players wore No. 21 to honor Taylor one last time before the end of the season. Taylor was coming off a Pro Bowl season in 2006, and was the leading vote getter for the NFC Free Safety in 2007 when his untimely death occurred. Taylor then became the first player to be posthumously elected to a Pro Bowl.

Although Sean Taylor's murder trial was originally scheduled for April 7, it was postponed until August 25 because both the defense attorneys and prosecutors were not properly prepared to begin by the initial trial date. On May 12, 2008, it was announced the suspects, if convicted, would not face the death penalty, but may be subjected to life imprisonment. On May 13, 2008, a fifth suspect in the murder of Taylor, Timothy Brown, was arrested and charged with first-degree murder and armed burglary of an occupied dwelling. Also on May 13, suspect Venjah Hunte signed a plea agreement and will serve 29 years in prison and cooperate with prosecutors.

=== Jim Zorn era (2008–2009) ===
==== 2008 ====
On January 7, 2008, Joe Gibbs announced his retirement for a second time, citing a need to spend more time with his family, in particular his grandson Taylor, who was diagnosed with leukemia in January 2007. Being former head coaches themselves, assistant head coach (defense) Gregg Williams and associate head coach (offense) Al Saunders were considered to be the top candidates for replacing Gibbs. This changed, however, on January 26, 2008, when both were fired and Greg Blache was promoted to defensive coordinator. The day before, Jim Zorn was hired as offensive coordinator. The hunt for a new coach lasted two more weeks with numerous coaches mentioned as a possible replacement, including former Giants coach Jim Fassel, Giants' defensive coordinator Steve Spagnuolo, Patriots' offensive coordinator Josh McDaniels, Colts defensive coordinator Ron Meeks, and Titans defensive coordinator Jim Schwartz, but nothing was finalized. The biggest surprise came on February 10, 2008, when the Redskins promoted newly hired offensive coordinator Zorn as head coach instead of hiring someone else outside the franchise. On February 15, 2008, Sherman Smith, former running backs coach for the Tennessee Titans, was hired as an offensive coordinator.

The franchise and fans alike expressed great pride on February 2, 2008, when the Pro Football Hall of Fame voted in former players Darrell Green and Art Monk, as well as former defensive backs coach Emmitt Thomas. They were inducted on August 2, 2008, during the Pro Football Hall of Fame Game (the preseason opener), in which the Redskins played the Colts. The Redskins also played in the NFL Kickoff game on September 4, 2008, against the Giants.

On April 5, 2008, the Redskins signed Pro Bowl kickoff returner and wide receiver Jerome Mathis from the Houston Texans, their only free agent signing during the 2008 offseason. However, he was waived by the team on May 15, 2008. The Redskins also lost players to free agency, including Mark Brunell, Reche Caldwell, David Macklin, and Pierson Prioleau. In the 2008 NFL draft, the Redskins selected standout wide receivers Devin Thomas and Malcolm Kelly, John Mackey Award winning tight end Fred Davis, Ray Guy Award winning punter Durant Brooks, and Sammy Baugh Trophy winning quarterback Colt Brennan.

==== 2009 ====
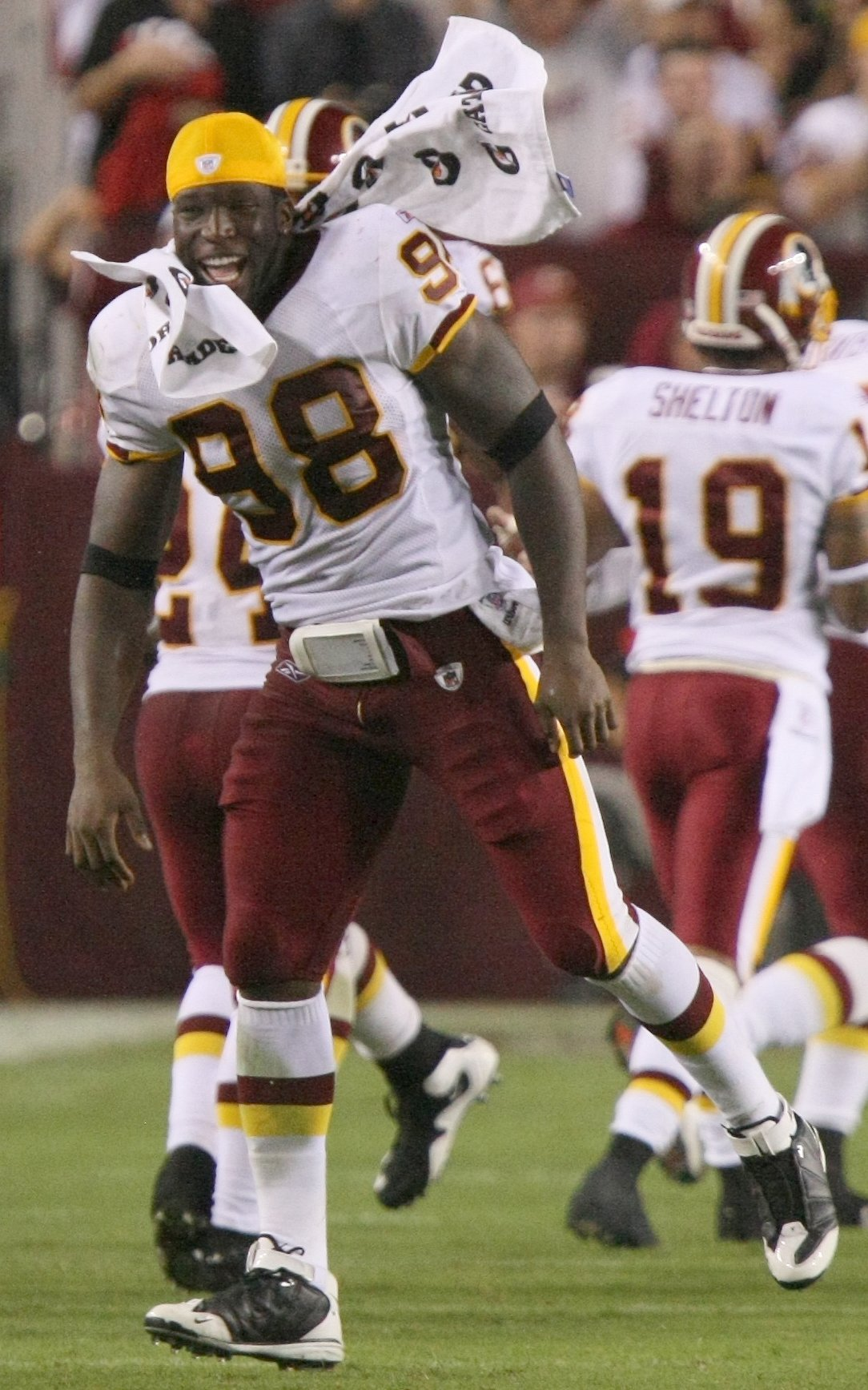
Brian Orakpo during a Redskins' preseason game in 2009.

The Redskins signed defensive tackle Albert Haynesworth to a 7-year, $100 million contract in the offseason. They also signed cornerback DeAngelo Hall to a 6-year, $54 million contract. Hall had joined the team for the final seven games of the 2008 season after being released by the Oakland Raiders.

The Redskins also signed offensive guard Derrick Dockery to a 5-year deal, bringing him back to the team that drafted him in 2003. In the 2009 NFL draft the Redskins, with the 13th pick overall in the first round, drafted defensive end Brian Orakpo out of Texas. Orakpo was dominant in his senior season (2008) with the Texas Longhorns winning multiple prestigious awards including the Bronko Nagurski Trophy, Ted Hendricks Award, Lombardi Award, and the Bill Willis Trophy, the Redskins hadn't had a pass rushing force like Orakpo since Dexter Manley and Charles Mann donned the burgundy & gold. Orakpo would go on to finish his rookie season with 50 combined tackles, 11 sacks, 1 forced fumble, 2 passes defensed, and 4 run stuffs. Orakpo's highlight game would come on December 13 against the Oakland Raiders, Orakpo recorded 6 combined tackles, 4 sacks, and 1 forced fumble earning him the NFC Defensive Player of the Week Award for his efforts, he also was selected to his first Pro Bowl. The Redskins also released two veterans, offensive tackle Jon Jansen and wide receiver/kick returner James Thrash.

After starting the season 2–3, although every Redskins' opponent had been previously winless, the Redskins hired former NFL offensive coordinator Sherman Lewis as an offensive consultant. Following a close loss to the Kansas City Chiefs, Lewis was promoted to playcalling duties with coach Jim Zorn was stripped of those duties. Despite huge controversy of the job security of coach Zorn, Vinny Cerrato had stated that Zorn will be the coach of the Redskins for the remainder of the season. However, Zorn and Campbell would outlast Cerrato himself, as he resigned after Week 14. While at the time it was stated in the press that Cerrato resigned, in a January 2013 interview with The Washington Post, Snyder stated he had in fact fired Cerrato for allowing him to hire the unqualified Jim Zorn as the head coach. Three days before the Monday Night Football game against the New York Giants, the Redskins hired former Tampa Bay Buccaneers general manager Bruce Allen. Despite the fanfare surrounding the Redskins after hiring the son of George Allen, the man who began the winning tradition in Washington, the Redskins were routed 45–12, being swept by the Giants for the third time in four years.

The Redskins finished their 2009 season on January 3, 2010, with a 23–20 loss to the San Diego Chargers. The next day, in the early morning, head coach Jim Zorn was fired. They finished with the 2009 season with a 4–12 record.

=== Mike Shanahan era (2010–2013) ===
==== 2010 ====
On January 5, 2010, Mike Shanahan agreed to a five-year contract with the Redskins and announced that he would bring his son, Kyle, from Houston to be the team's offensive coordinator, and ex-NFL head coach Jim Haslett for the defensive coordinator position. They also hired Sean McVay as the assistant tight ends coach. Other major changes in the coaching staff included retirement of long-time offensive line coach Joe Bugel and defensive coordinator Greg Blache. Jim Haslett made a major change to the defensive scheme, switching from the traditional 4–3 defense to a 3–4 defense, a move which drastically changed the Redskins' plans for defensive personnel. Ahead of free agency, general manager Bruce Allen released 10 players, including notables such as Antwaan Randle El and Fred Smoot.

Early in his tenure at Washington, Mike Shanahan entered into a heated controversy with star defensive lineman Albert Haynesworth. Haynesworth, unhappy with the prospect of playing the position of nose tackle in the new 3–4 defense, did not attend off-season team activities or mandatory minicamp. Shanahan refused to let Haynesworth practice at preseason camp until he passed a fitness test. Haynesworth was unable to pass this test for several weeks, during which the divide between him and Shanahan grew deeper. On December 7, 2010, Haynesworth was suspended for the last four games of the season for conduct detrimental to the team, after he told general manager Bruce Allen that he refused to speak to Coach Shanahan after Shanahan made Haynesworth inactive in Week 13 for poor practice the week prior. Shanahan said the suspension followed a refusal by Haynesworth to cooperate in a series of ways and not only because of the practice absence.

On April 4, 2010, the team acquired Pro Bowl quarterback Donovan McNabb from the division rival Philadelphia Eagles in exchange for a second-round pick in the 2010 draft and a fourth-round pick in 2011. On April 22, 2010, in the 2010 NFL draft, the team selected All-American Oklahoma Tackle Trent Williams with the 4th overall pick. Also during the 2010 draft, they traded their former starting quarterback Jason Campbell to the Oakland Raiders for a 2012 fourth-round draft pick.

The Redskins won their season opener, 13–7, at FedExField against the Dallas Cowboys on September 12, 2010. The game was also Coach Shanahan's debut with the team. On October 24, 2010, DeAngelo Hall recorded 4 interceptions in a game against the Chicago Bears at Soldier Field, tying former Redskin Sammy Baugh with a team single-game pass interception record. The Redskins went on to win the game 17–14 and earned Hall a Pro-Bowl spot with his performance.

On December 17, only three days before the Redskins traveled to Dallas, Coach Shanahan announced that McNabb would no longer be the starting quarterback, and he was benched in favor of Rex Grossman. McNabb was the second-string quarterback for the Dallas game, and the third-string quarterback for the last two games of the season. Shanahan also reportedly told McNabb that he could not guarantee that McNabb would be with the team the next year. In the game against Dallas, Grossman threw for 322 yards, 4 touchdowns and two 2-point conversions, yet he turned the ball over three times. It was not enough, however, to overcome the Cowboys, who won 33–30. The Redskins would finish the season with a 6–10 record.

==== 2011 ====
At the conclusion of the 2010 season, Mike Shanahan stated that the Redskins were going to revamp their roster in the coming offseason via trades, free agency and the draft. On February 28, after finishing five of his seven seasons in Washington on injured reserve, the Redskins released Clinton Portis, due to the $8 million he was scheduled to make next season. The Redskins then released veteran guard Derrick Dockery and linebacker Andre Carter. On March 3, the Redskins signed O.J Atogwe to a five-year contract. The Redskins then traded troubled defensive tackle Albert Haynesworth to the New England Patriots for a 5th-round pick in the 2012 NFL Draft. The Redskins then traded Quarterback Donovan McNabb to the Minnesota Vikings for two 6th round draft picks. The Redskins chose not to re-sign their 2005 first round draft pick Carlos Rogers, who later signed with the San Francisco 49ers.

In the 2011 NFL draft, the Redskins traded the 10th overall pick to the Jacksonville Jaguars for the 16th pick, among others, and selected defensive end Ryan Kerrigan from Purdue. Kerrigan won the Bill Willis Trophy his senior season (2010) while also becoming the Big Ten Conferences all-time leader in forced fumbles with 14, which also tied the Football Bowl Subdivision (FBS) career record of 14 forced fumbles. Kerrigan was also awarded Purdue's "Pit Bull Award" in 2009, which was given to the player that exemplified and displayed tenacity and tough play. During his rookie season with Washington, Kerrigan would go on to record 63 combined tackles, 7.5 sacks, 4 forced fumbles, 4 passes defensed, 4 run stuffs, and 1 interception that he returned for a 9-yard touchdown in week 1 against the Redskins NFC East division rival New York Giants. During the 2011 NFL season, Redskins outside linebacker Ryan Kerrigan along with fellow Redskins outside linebacker Brian Orakpo earned the nickname KERRAKPO for being the Redskins dynamic pass rushing duo, of which the likes the Redskins had not had since the pass rushing duo of Dexter Manley and Charles Mann during the 1980s. The Washington Redskins also made a habit of trading down and acquiring more, later round picks in the draft; the team entered the draft with 7 picks and ended up making a total of 12 selections. The Redskins selected Jarvis Jenkins, a defensive tackle from Clemson University in the second round; Mike Shanahan addressed this selection in a post-draft interview, saying that Jenkins will transition to a defensive end in the 3–4 defensive scheme that Jim Haslett runs. In the 3rd preseason game against the Ravens, Jenkins tore his ACL in the 1st quarter, resulting in an end to his promising rookie season.

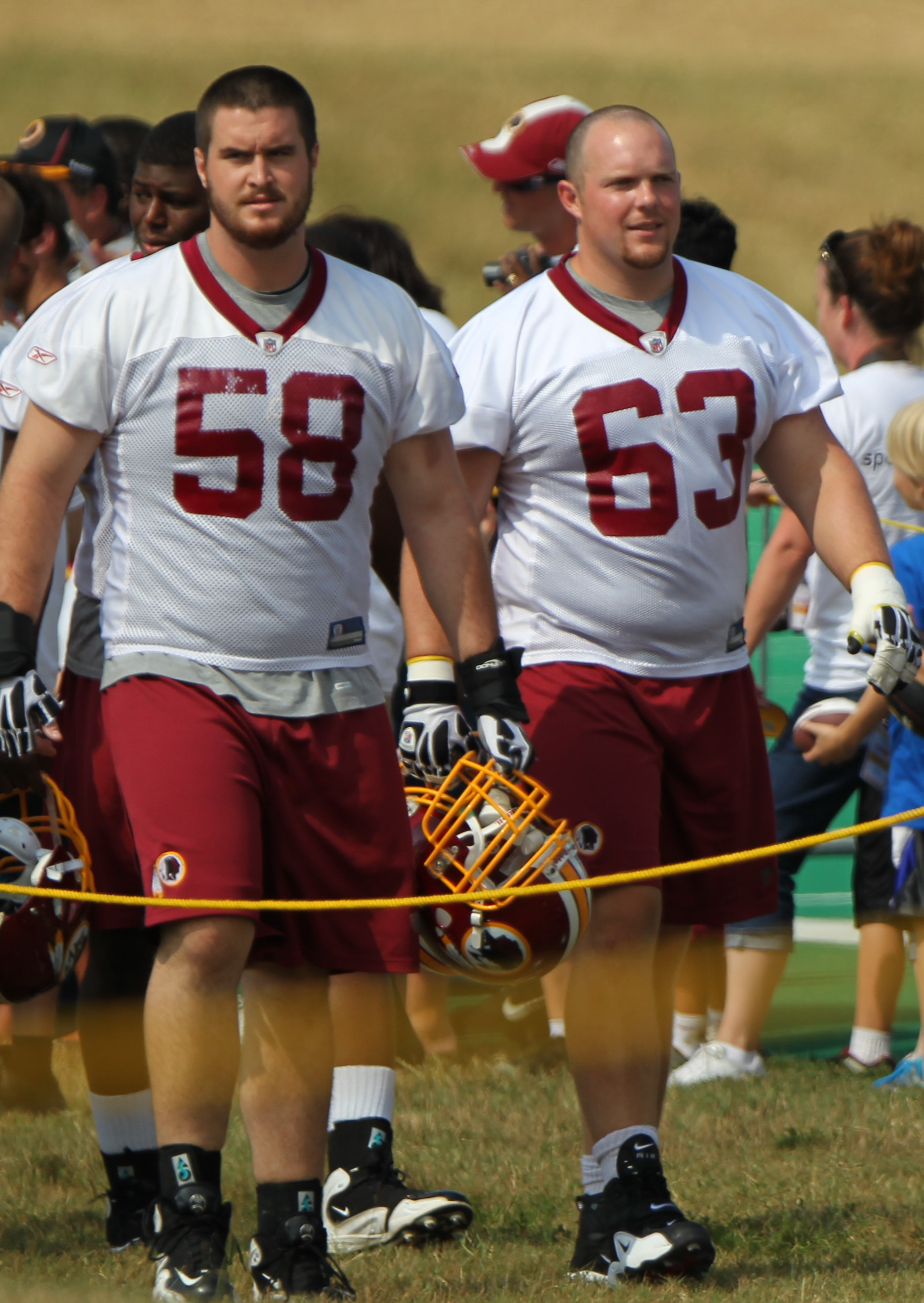
Will Montgomery (right) with back-up Erik Cook at Redskins training camp in 2011

On the 10th Anniversary of the September 11 terrorist attacks which impacted both the cities of New York and Washington, D.C., the Redskins won their season opener, 28–14, at FedExField against the New York Giants. The game also featured an interception for a touchdown by 2011 first round draft pick Ryan Kerrigan against quarterback Eli Manning of the Giants.

During Week 6, quarterback Rex Grossman was benched in favor of backup John Beck after throwing four interceptions. John Beck was then given the nod by Coach Mike Shanahan to start the following week. Beck started the next three games going 0–3, and was finally benched after Shanahan realized that while Beck's mobility was exceptional and superior to Grossman's, he did not have the range of Grossman. Running back Tim Hightower played well starting in five of the Redskins' six games, in which he rushed for 321 yards on 84 carries with two total touchdowns, Hightower was placed on injured reserve due to a torn ACL. Afterward, Coach Shanahan began splitting reps between running back Ryan Torain and rookie running back Roy Helu. Torain showed inconsistency throughout the season, despite a good start against the Rams which he rushed for over 100 yards and 1 touchdown. On November 6, 2011, in his first career start, Helu broke the Redskins all-time record for receptions in a game with 14 catches, in a loss against the San Francisco 49ers. On November 27, 2011, Helu rushed for a Redskins rookie-record 108 yards on 23 carries and a touchdown against the Seattle Seahawks' top-ten ranked run defense. He was then named the full-time starter by Coach Shanahan, and responded with three consecutive 100-yard performances. Following his 126-yard performance against the New England Patriots, Helu led all active rookies in rush yards. His streak of three consecutive 100-yard games is the most by any Redskins rookie in franchise history; a record he was unable to extend to four games due to an injury he sustained. During Week 16 against the Vikings rookie running back Evan Royster made his first career start rushing for 132 yards on 19 carries while Helu was nursing an injured knee and toe. After week 13 the Redskins were informed that starting tight end Fred Davis and left tackle Trent Willams would be suspended for the rest of the season for failing consecutive drug tests. On December 27 running back Ryan Torain was released and the Redskins activated wide receiver Aldrick Robinson, their 6th pick, from the practice squad making 11 of the Redskins 2011 draft picks on the 53-man roster (the only one who did not make it was 2nd round pick defensive end Jarvis Jenkins who was placed on injured reserve during the preseason). The Redskins finished the season at 5–11, which was the worst season recorded for Shanahan at the time.

==== 2012, division title ====
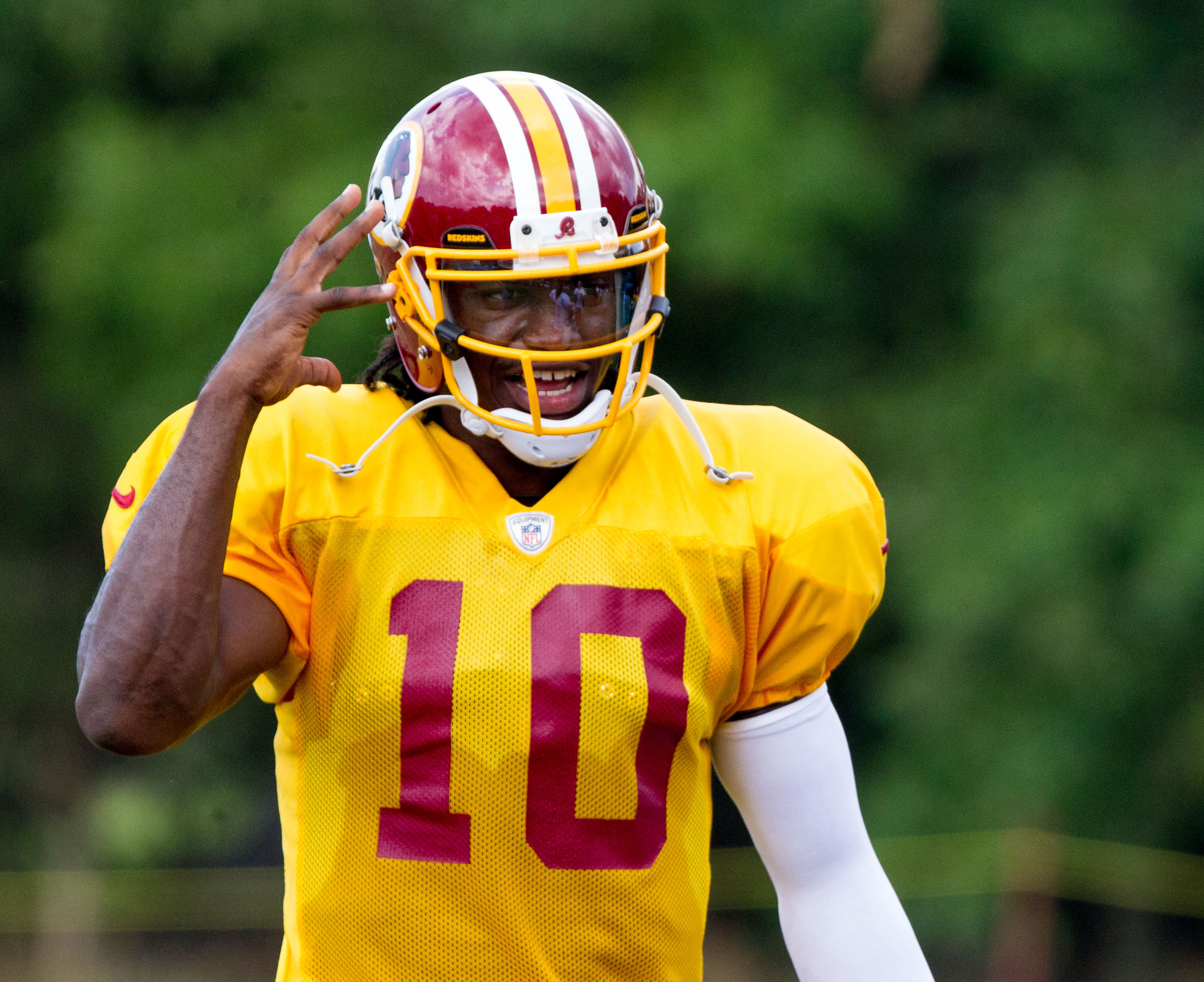
Quarterback Robert Griffin III won the league's Offensive Rookie of the Year award in 2012, while also leading the team to their first division title since 1999.

The long-awaited arrival of the practice bubble at Redskins Park was completed in early 2012. Former Redskins defensive end, Phillip Daniels, was hired as the new director of player development on February 17, 2012. On March 2, 2012, the Redskins announced that they had placed a franchise tag on Fred Davis. On March 9, 2012, the Redskins agreed in principle to trade their first round (#6 overall) and second round (#39 overall) picks in the 2012 NFL draft, as well as their first-round picks in the 2013 (#22 overall) and 2014 (#2 overall) NFL Drafts, to the St. Louis Rams for their second overall draft pick in 2012. They proceeded to select Robert Griffin III, after the Indianapolis Colts selected Andrew Luck from Stanford University with the 1st overall pick. Griffin III would go on to complete 65.6% of his passes for 3,200 yards, 20 touchdowns, and only 5 interceptions while also having a 102.4 passer rating which would be the highest rookie QB passer rating in NFL history. Griffin III also rushed for 815 yards and 7 touchdowns becoming only the sixth quarterback in NFL history to rush for at least 800 yards, he also won the 2012 NFL Offensive Rookie of the Year Award for his outstanding play and was selected to his first Pro Bowl, but did not participate due to injury. On March 12, 2012, the NFL commission fined the Redskins $36 million in cap space over two years because of the organization's approach to structuring contracts in the 2010 NFL season, when there was no salary cap. On March 26, 2012, the Redskins and the Dallas Cowboys, who were penalized $10 million in cap space, filed a grievance against NFL and the NFLPA to attempt to overturn their cap space penalties. The joint grievance was dismissed on May 22, 2012.

Pierre Garçon and Josh Morgan were the first two free agents signings that the Redskins made for the 2012 season. Veteran kicker Neil Rackers was also signed to compete with inconsistent starter, Graham Gano. The team re-signed defensive co-captain, London Fletcher, to a five-year deal that expires in two. The Redskins also proceeded to re-sign last season's starters, Tim Hightower, Will Montgomery, Adam Carriker, and Kory Lichtensteiger during the offseason. They decided to not re-sign LaRon Landry, making him the third player who was a first-round draft pick of the Washington Redskins to leave the team since the Shanahan administration; the first being Campbell (via trade) and the second being Rogers (via free agency). Landry would later sign a one-year deal with the New York Jets.

The Redskins released veteran fullback, Mike Sellers, and last season's starters, Oshiomogho Atogwe and Jabar Gaffney. Despite being the team's leader in receiving yards, Gaffney was cut after the team failed to trade him. His leaving of the team was expected due to the additions of free agent wide receivers, Garçon and Morgan, and the expectancy of second-year receiver, Leonard Hankerson, to emerge as a threat for the 2012 season. The most surprising release of the season was starting tight end, Chris Cooley, on August 28, 2012. However, to the delight of many fans, Cooley was re-signed by the team in October following an injury to Fred Davis.

Running back Alfred Morris was drafted by the Redskins in the sixth round of the 2012 NFL draft. Following an impressive preseason, he was given the starting job. In an important game against the New York Giants on December 3, 2012, Morris became only the second rookie in Redskins history to gain 1,000 rushing yards in a season, ultimately finishing the regular season with 1,613 rushing yards which would be a Redskins single season rushing record, and the second most rushing yards in the league in 2012 only behind Adrian Peterson.

Redskins outside linebacker Brian Orakpo tore his left Pectoral muscle in a Week 2 game against the St. Louis Rams, on a play in which he had a sack and forced fumble. It was the same muscle he injured the previous season in the final game against the Philadelphia Eagles. Head coach Mike Shanahan confirmed the next day that Orakpo would have surgery and miss the remainder of the season and be placed on the injured reserve list. Orakpo's injury highlighted a slew of injuries suffered by the Redskins in 2012.

The Redskins would go on to make the 2012–13 NFL playoffs after winning their final seven games of the season en route to winning their division championship for the 13th time in franchise history, including defeating the Dallas Cowboys on Thanksgiving Day by a score of 38–31, this marked the first time the Redskins had won at Cowboys Stadium as well as the first time Washington had defeated the Cowboys on Thanksgiving, previously 0–5 to their archrival on Thanksgiving Day. RGIII completed 19 of 27 passes for 304 yards and had 4 touchdown passes and 1 interception on his way to winning the Galloping Gobbler Award issued to the player deemed to have had the best performance in the game. Alfred Morris also had 113 yards rushing on 24 carries and 1 touchdown while the Redskins defense intercepted two passes from Cowboys quarterback Tony Romo and sacked him a total of three times. Then in the last game of the 2012 NFL season the Redskins met the Cowboys in a huge game in prime time on NBC Sunday Night Football at FedExField in a matchup that was to decide the winner of the NFC East division with the winner advancing to the playoffs and the loser missing the playoffs. The Redskins would not disappoint the home crowd and put on a show winning the game 28–18 behind a spectacular performance by Redskins rookie running back Alfred Morris who rushed for 200 yards and 3 touchdowns on 33 carries, while the Redskins offensive line only gave up one sack the entire game and held Cowboys defensive stalwart DeMarcus Ware, who was playing with a hurt shoulder and elbow, to 0 sacks and just one assisted tackle. The Redskins defense, led by London Fletcher's 11 total tackles, 2 sacks, and 1 pass defensed, confused and rattled Cowboys quarterback Tony Romo all game long. The Redskins defense had 2 sacks and 3 interceptions in the game with the final one being the most costly, with Dallas trailing 21–18 late in the fourth quarter from the Cowboys own 29-yard line, Romo threw a pass to the flat intended for Cowboys running back DeMarco Murray which was intercepted by Redskins outside linebacker Rob Jackson who was pretending he was going to blitz on the play but at the last second dropped into coverage fooling Tony Romo to make the game changing interception on a play designed by Redskins defensive coordinator Jim Haslett, propelling the Redskins to their first playoff appearance since 2007 and their first NFC East title since 1999.

The Redskins would go on to face the Seattle Seahawks in the wild card round of the 2012–2013 NFL playoffs. The Redskins quickly jumped out to a 14–0 lead on the Seahawks in the first quarter but Redskins quarterback Robert Griffin III would tweak a previous knee injury he got against the Baltimore Ravens earlier in the season while scrambling to pick up a first down, he was hit by the Ravens 350 lb. defensive tackle Haloti Ngata causing his knee to bend awkwardly and spraining his LCL. Griffin III would try his best though to lead his team to victory and stayed in the game and played through the pain, although he was not very effective he showed courage up to the moment on a bobbled snap, his knee gave out from underneath him and he tore his LCL and ACL. The loss of RGIII proved to be too much for the Redskins to overcome, and eventually succumbed to the Seahawks 24–14. Griffin III had surgery on January 9, 2013, performed by Dr. James Andrews and both his LCL and ACL were repaired. Griffin then vowed to return better than ever for the Redskins 2013 season opener against the Philadelphia Eagles.

Prince George's County and D.C. officials were reportedly making a play to lure the Redskins back to their respective areas for training camp at either RFK Stadium or Bowie State University. However, the Redskins eventually chose to relocate their summer training camp to Richmond, Virginia.

==== 2013 ====
After winning the NFC East in the previous season, hopes were high for a repeat in 2013. However, these hopes were in vain, as poor play and controversy stirred during the entire year, leading to the disastrous record of 3–13. This was the worst record the Redskins have posted since 1994. Even though most players had a down year compared to last season, Pierre Garçon had his greatest season statistically yet. Garcon eventually broke Art Monk's 29-year-old franchise record for catches in a single season. Garcon had 113 catches total, which broke Monk's 106 catches in 1984 by seven.

The Washington Redskins fired Shanahan and most of his staff on December 30, 2013.

=== Jay Gruden era (2014–2019) ===
==== 2014 ====
On January 9, 2014, the Redskins hired Jay Gruden as their head coach. Gruden became the eighth head coach of the team since Daniel Snyder purchased the franchise in 1999. Gruden lost his first regular season game as an NFL coach against the Houston Texans 17–6 with the Texans defense controlling the Washington offense for the majority of the game. Gruden would then go on to win his first game as an NFL head coach the following week against the Jacksonville Jaguars 41–10. Gruden and the Redskins struggled throughout the season, having three different quarterbacks start games, amounting to a 4–12 record. Defense coordinator Jim Haslett was fired at the end of the season.

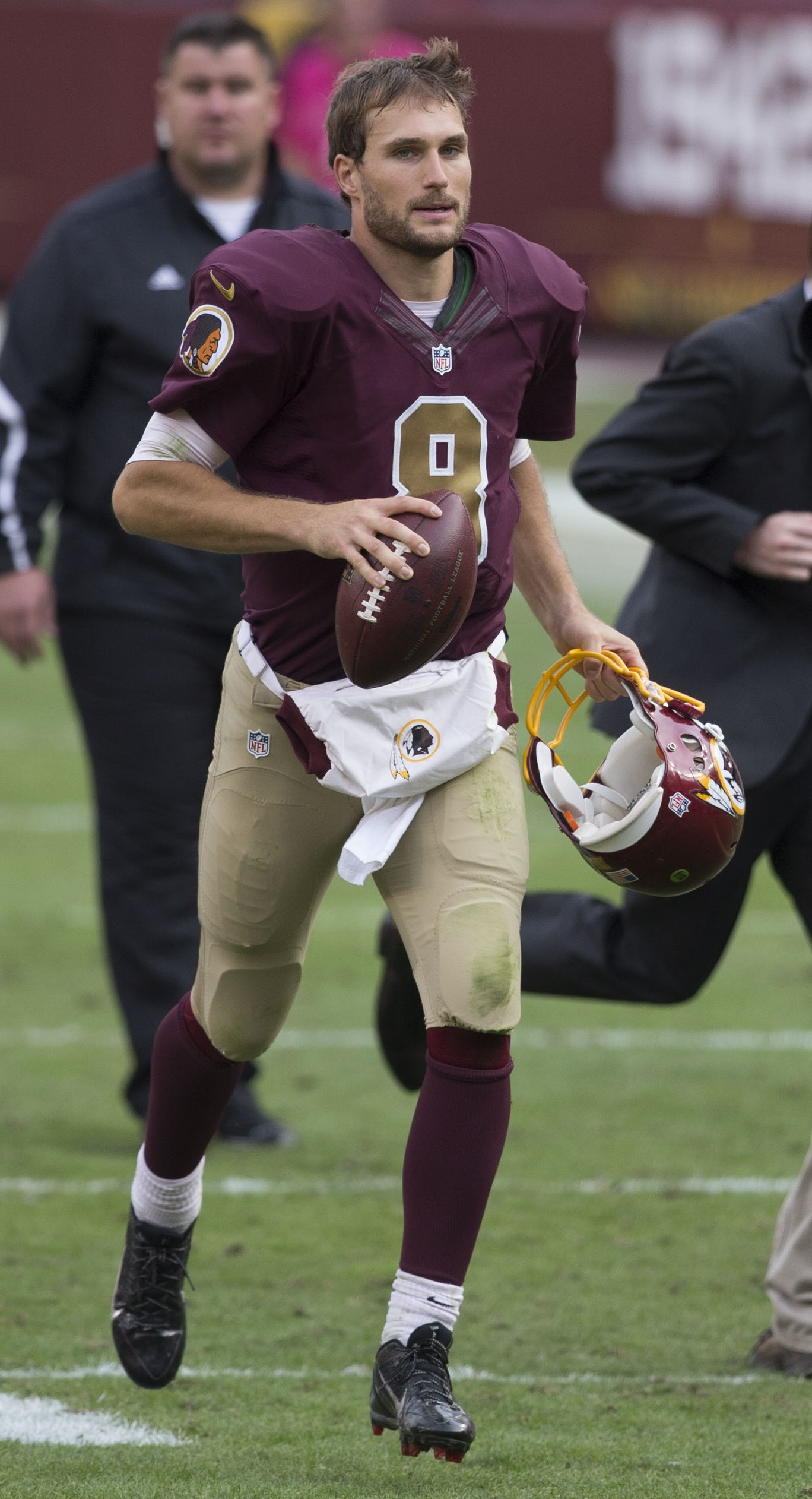
Quarterback Kirk Cousins after the comeback victory against the Tampa Bay Buccaneers in 2015, the biggest in franchise history

In August 2014, team owner Daniel Snyder made public his desire of getting the team a new stadium, which would eventually replace FedExField, the home for the team for nearly 20 seasons. While the location has yet to be decided, Snyder indicated the possibility of building a domed stadium at the site of the old RFK Stadium in the district itself, but also stated that other sites in Maryland and Virginia were a possibility as well. Early plans have included making the stadium and fan experience more nostalgic, akin to the days at RFK Stadium, where the team spent over 30 years. Snyder also stated his desire for the area to host a Super Bowl as a contributing factor behind his push for a new stadium.

==== 2015 ====
On January 7, 2015, the Redskins hired Scot McCloughan to be their general manager. McCloughan took over control of the roster from Bruce Allen, who was given the sole title of team president after the hiring. On October 25, 2015, the Redskins had their largest comeback win in franchise history, coming back to win against the Tampa Bay Buccaneers 31–30, after being down 0–24 in the second quarter.

The Redskins clinched the NFC East division title on December 26, when they beat the Philadelphia Eagles in Week 16, 38–24. The division title was their third since Snyder took over ownership of the team, and was the first since the 1999 season to be clinched before Week 17. The Redskins hosted the Green Bay Packers in the Wild Card round on January 10, 2016, but lost 35–18, ending their 2015 season.

Kirk Cousins, who took over as starting quarterback in the preseason, finished the season with career highs in touchdowns (29), yards (4,166), and completion percentage (69.8%). His completion percentage led the league, while his 29 touchdowns tied him for second on the franchise single-season list.

==== 2016 ====
Prior to the start of the season, the Redskins announced that they had hired Danish architecture firm Bjarke Ingels Group to begin work on a new stadium. The team's offense in 2016 set several franchise records, including having over 6,000 total net yards, which was only the third time in franchise history the team had accomplished that. Quarterback Kirk Cousins also set single-season team records in attempts, completions, and passing yards, breaking many of his records he had previously set in 2015. DeSean Jackson, Pierre Garçon, Jamison Crowder, Robert Kelley, Chris Thompson, Jordan Reed, Vernon Davis, and Matt Jones all finished the season with at least 500 yards from scrimmage, tying the 2011 New Orleans Saints for the most in a single season in NFL history.

Despite the numerous records set, the Redskins missed the playoffs, losing 19–10 in a "win and in" situation against the New York Giants in the final week of the season. However, the Redskins still finished the season with a record of 8–7–1, giving the team their first consecutive winning seasons in nearly 20 years. In contrast with the record setting offense, the team's defense had a poor season, finishing 29 out of 32 teams in total defense, which lead to the firing of defensive coordinator Joe Barry, as well as three of his assistants.

==== 2017 ====
2017 was the team's 85th season. While playing under the franchise tag, Kirk Cousins threw for over 4,000 passing yards. The Redskins finished the year at 7–9 missing the playoffs. After the season, Cousins left the team as a free agent to join the Minnesota Vikings, ending his six-year tenure with the Redskins.

==== 2018 ====
Following the departure of Kirk Cousins, the Redskins traded for Kansas City Chiefs quarterback Alex Smith; in exchange the Redskins gave the Chiefs Kendall Fuller and a third-round pick in the 2018 NFL draft.

During the season, the Redskins got off to a promising start with their new quarterback with a record of 6–3 record. However, during a Week 11 game against the Houston Texans, Smith would break his leg with a spiral compound fracture to his tibia and fibula that would end his season. This led to a Quarterback carousel of Colt McCoy, Mark Sanchez, and Josh Johnson. The Redskins would not recover from the injuries as they would collapse losing 1–6 and end up finishing the season 7–9 for the second year in a row and missing the playoffs. The Redskins had a league-high 25 players on injured reserve at the end of the season.

==== 2019 ====
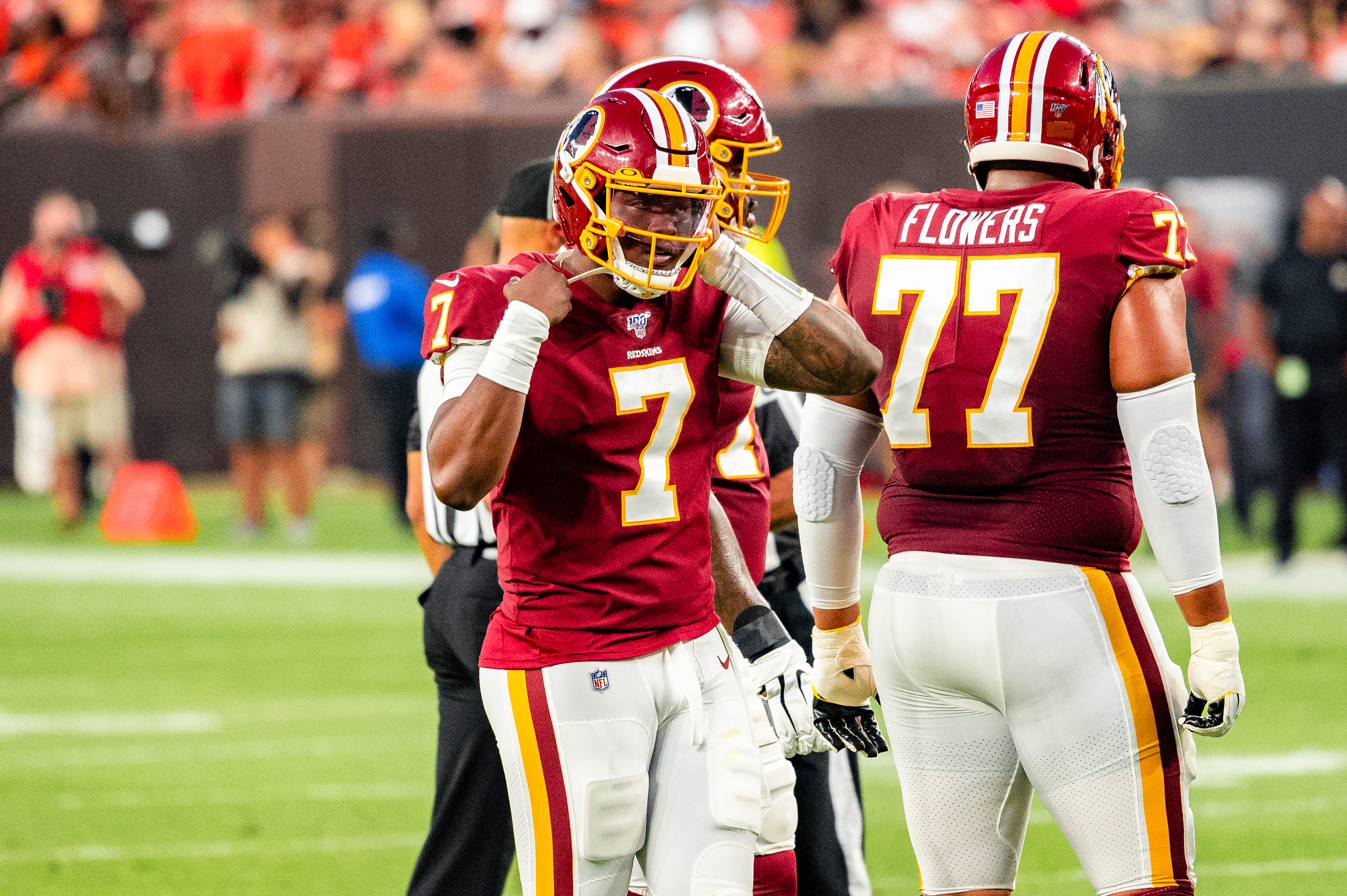
Quarterback Dwayne Haskins (#7) was drafted in the first round of the 2019 NFL draft but released the following year after inconsistent play and off-the-field issues.

Due to Alex Smith's injury, the Redskins acquired Case Keenum from the Denver Broncos in the off season and drafted Dwayne Haskins from Ohio State in the 2019 NFL draft. However Keenum was named the starting QB on August 25, 2019, for the Week 1 opener against the Philadelphia Eagles. During the season, the Redskins started the season 0–5 which included the Redskins blowing a 17-point halftime lead against the Philadelphia Eagles, and a 24–3 loss to the Daniel Jones led New York Giants where in Haskins debut due to him replacing a struggling Keenum for the Redskins, ended with three interceptions thrown with one returned for a touchdown and two thrown to Janoris Jenkins. On October 4, 2019, Colt McCoy was named the starter over Haskins and Keenum for the game against the New England Patriots. However the Redskins lost 33–7 despite early success with a 65-yard touchdown run by Steven Sims.

With a league worst 0–5 record at the time tying with the Cincinnati Bengals, and their worst start since 2001, the Redskins fired head coach Jay Gruden on October 7, 2019. Gruden finished his six-year tenure with the Redskins with a 35–49–1 regular season record with one playoff appearance. Bill Callahan was named the interim head coach as of result. Callahan got the Redskins first victory over the 0–4 Miami Dolphins snapping a 7-game losing streak dating back to Week 16 of last year. This was Callahan's first NFL victory as a head coach since Week 15 with the Oakland Raiders in 2003.

Throughout the season, fans voiced their apathy and displeasure with the team's management by owner Dan Snyder and team president Bruce Allen, and reports of dysfunction within the Redskins organization often surfaced. Following a 3–13 finish to the season, Allen was fired by the Redskins, ending a 10-year stint with the team.

=== Rebranding, federal investigations into Snyder (2020–2023) ===
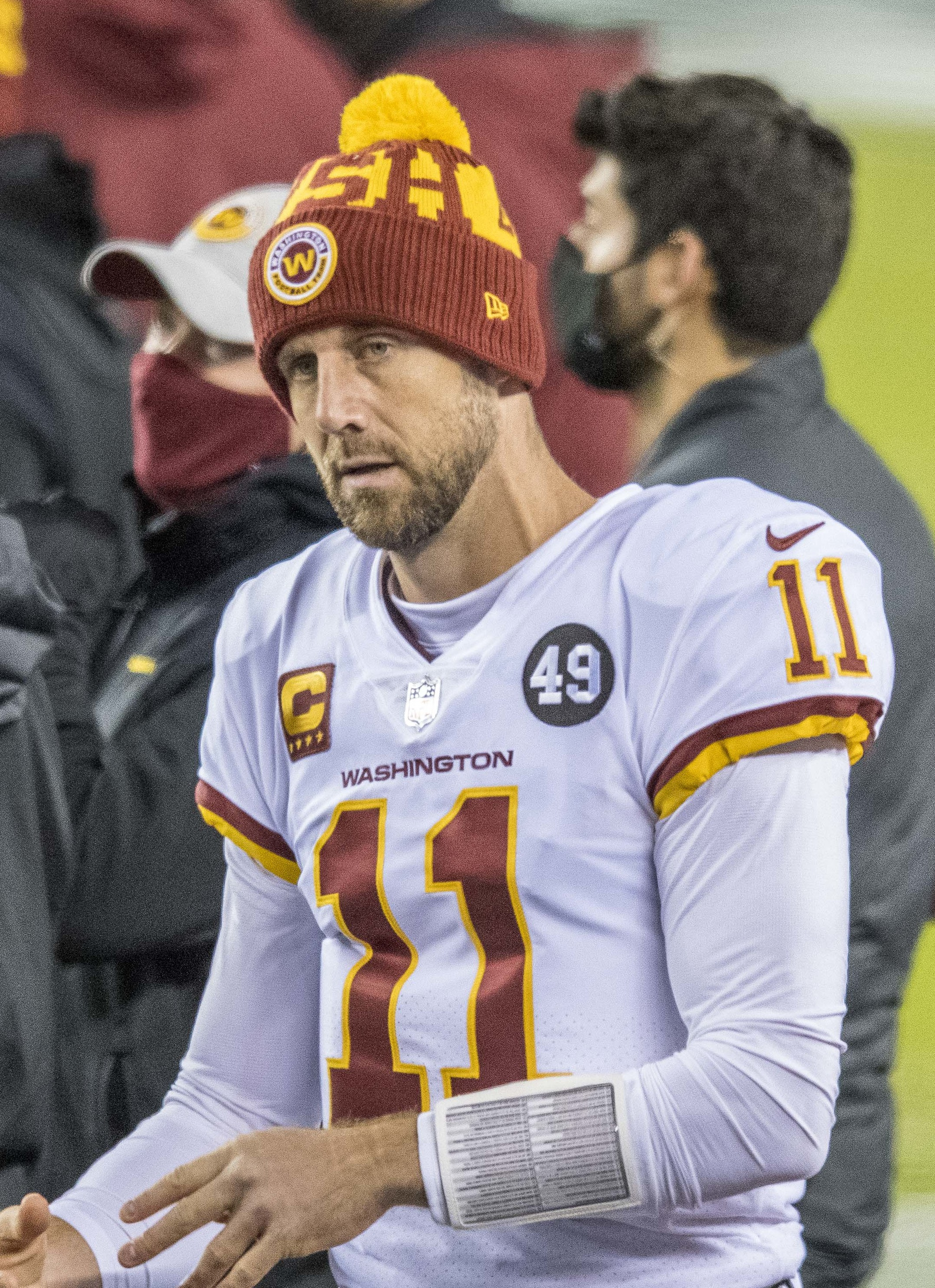
Having fully recovered from a life-threatening leg injury from 2018, quarterback Alex Smith helped lead the team to a NFC East division title in 2020, earning the NFL Comeback Player of the Year award in the process.

The team underwent several changes in 2020, including retiring the Redskins name and logo and hiring former Carolina Panthers head coach Ron Rivera in the same role, as well as naming Jason Wright as team president, the first black person named to that position in NFL history. Some notable members of Rivera's staff include former Jacksonville Jaguars and Oakland Raiders head coach Jack Del Rio as defensive coordinator and Scott Turner, the son of former Redskins head coach Norv Turner, as offensive coordinator.

Under Rivera and Del Rio, the team switched their defensive scheme from a 3–4 defense, which the team had used under both Shanahan and Gruden's tenure, to a 4–3 defense. Due to their 3–13 record the previous season, the team had the second overall pick in the 2020 NFL draft and selected Chase Young, who would go on to be named Defensive Rookie of the Year. Dwayne Haskins, the team's first-round draft pick from 2019, was released prior to the season's end due to ineffective play and not meeting the team's standards off the field. Despite that, Washington would eventually win the division for the first time since 2015 at 7–9, becoming only the third team in NFL history to win a division with a losing record in a non-strike year after the 2010 Seattle Seahawks and 2014 Carolina Panthers, the latter of which Rivera also coached.

Earlier in 2020, minority owners Robert Rothman, Dwight Schar, and Frederick W. Smith were reported to have hired an investment banking firm to help search for potential buyers for their stake in the team, worth around 40 percent combined. The group, who bought their stake in 2003, were reported to have urged Snyder to change the name for years. In April 2021, Snyder was approved by the league for a debt waiver of $400 million to acquire the remaining 40 percent in a deal worth over $800 million.

Some other additions and changes in 2021 included the team hiring Martin Mayhew as general manager and Marty Hurney as another high-ranking executive. With the hiring of Mayhew, who is black, Washington became the first team in NFL history to concurrently have a minority general manager, head coach, and president. Ryan Kerrigan, the franchise's all-time leader in sacks, left the team as a free agent to sign with the division rival Philadelphia Eagles.

A year-long independent investigation into the team's workplace culture under owner Daniel Snyder, led by lawyer Beth Wilkinson, was concluded in July 2021. It found that several incidents of sexual harassment, bullying, and intimidation were commonplace throughout the organization under his ownership. The NFL fined the team $10 million in response, with Snyder also voluntarily stepping down from running the team's day-to-day operations for a few months, giving those responsibilities to his wife Tanya. Snyder would later be investigated by the United States House Committee on Oversight and Reform for those claims, as well as accusations of financial improprieties.

The 2021 season would be less successful as they went on to miss the playoffs at 7–10. Two highlights in the season they managed to upset Tom Brady and the Tampa Bay Buccaneers and they would sweep the New York Giants for the first time since 2011.

The team rebranded as the Commanders in 2022 and continued to see cultural changes within the organization. With the rebrand, their fight song returned with revised lyrics as "Hail to the Commanders", while their longtime cheerleading squad was replaced by a co-ed performance group known as the Command Force. The year also saw the team trade for Colts quarterback Carson Wentz, who was released after the season due to poor performance.

The 2022 Commanders season would improve to 8–8–1 but would go on to miss the playoffs.

== Josh Harris ownership (2023–present) ==
In November 2022, Snyder hired BofA Securities to explore possible sale transactions of the franchise. In May 2023, he reached an agreement to sell to an investment group led by Josh Harris, who also owns the Philadelphia 76ers and New Jersey Devils, for $6.05 billion. The group has 20 limited partners worth a combined $100 billion, including Danaher founder and art collector Mitchell Rales, NBA hall of famer Magic Johnson, senior Blackstone executive and multi-sports club owner David Blitzer, venture capitalist Mark Ein, Maverick Capital founder Lee Ainslie, Blue Owl Capital founders Marc Lipschultz and Doug Ostrover, financier Alejandro Santo Domingo and his family, ProShares founder Michael Sapir, former Google CEO Eric Schmidt, and Cambridge Information Group CEO Andy Snyder. The sale was the largest of any sports team and was unanimously approved by league owners on July 20, 2023.

In 2023, after a surprising 2–0 start for the first time since 2011, the Commanders would collapse and ended their season on an 8-game losing streak. On January 8, 2024, head coach Ron Rivera was fired as a result.

On February 3, 2024, the Commanders hired former Atlanta Falcons head coach and Dallas Cowboys defensive coordinator Dan Quinn as their next head coach. During the 2024 NFL draft, the Commanders drafted LSU quarterback and 2023 Heisman Trophy winner Jayden Daniels using the 2nd overall pick.

The 2024 season was the franchise's most successful season in decades. The Commanders finished with a 12–5 record and second place in the NFC East division. They returned to the playoffs for the first time under the "Commanders" moniker, clinching the sixth seed, and upset the three–seeded Tampa Bay Buccaneers in the Wild Card round by a score of 23–20 for their first playoff win since 2005 (coincidentally, also against the Buccaneers as the Redskins). They would continue an unlikely run by defeating the top–seeded Detroit Lions in the divisional round 45–31 to advance to the NFC championship for the first time since 1991, ending what had been the longest active NFC Championship Game appearance drought. However, they were eliminated by the division rival and eventual Super Bowl champion Philadelphia Eagles in the NFC Championship Game. Daniels set an NFL record for most rushing yards by a rookie quarterback in a single season, earning him NFL Offensive Rookie of the Year honors.

Despite a 3-2 start to the 2025 season, the bottom would fall out quickly for Washington, as injuries to Daniels and star receiver Terry McLaurin caused the team to spiral into an 8-game losing streak. During that stretch, the Commanders became the first NFL team since 2002 to lose 4 consecutive games by 21 or more points. They rallied to win 2 out of their final four games to finish with a record of 5-12.
