= 1982 Washington Redskins season =

NFL team season (won Super Bowl)

- Owner: Jack Kent Cooke
- General manager: Bobby Beathard
- President: Edward Bennett Williams
- Head coach: Joe Gibbs
- Offensive coordinator: Joe Bugel
- Defensive coordinator: Richie Petitbon
- Home stadium: RFK Stadium

Results
- Record: 8–1
- Division place: 1st NFC
- Playoffs: Won Wild Card Playoffs (vs. Lions) 31–7; Won Divisional Playoffs (vs. Vikings) 21–7; Won NFC Championship (vs. Cowboys) 31–17; Won Super Bowl XVII (vs. Dolphins) 27–17
- All-Pros: 2: K Mark Moseley (1st team); KR Mike Nelms (2nd team)
- Pro Bowlers: 5: WR Charlie Brown; K Mark Moseley; KR Mike Nelms; SS Tony Peters; QB Joe Theismann

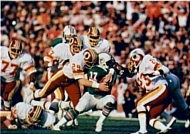
The Redskins playing against the Dolphins in Super Bowl XVII.

The 1982 Washington Redskins season was the franchise's 51st season in the National Football League (NFL) and their 46th in Washington, D.C. Although the Redskins lost all their preseason games, they advanced from an 8–8 record the previous season to become the first team in NFL history to win the Super Bowl after not winning a pre-season game (this would be repeated by the Los Angeles Rams 39 years later). The 1990 Buffalo Bills and 2000 New York Giants also reached the Super Bowl after a winless pre-season, but they did not win it.

The 1982 NFL season was shortened from sixteen games per team to nine because of a players’ strike. The NFL adopted a special 16-team playoff tournament; division standings were ignored, and the top eight teams from each conference earned playoff berths with seeds corresponding to their position in the conference standings. With the best record in the NFC, Washington received the number one seed in the conference for the playoff tournament. Although they and the Los Angeles Raiders had identical 8–1 records, the Redskins were the best in the league because they had a +62-point differential, which was 2 more than the Raiders.

The Redskins marched through the NFC playoffs, beating each of their opponents by an average of 19 points. In a rematch of Washington's only prior Super Bowl appearance ten years prior, the Redskins—in a game famous for Washington's "70 Chip" play on fourth-and-1—went on to beat the Miami Dolphins 27–17 to win Super Bowl XVII. It was the Redskins’ first ever Super Bowl victory, and their first NFL Championship in 40 years. Combining the post-season and their first Super Bowl victory, the Redskins finished the season with an overall record of 12–1.

NFL Films produced a documentary about the team's season entitled Hail To The Redskins; it was narrated by John Facenda. On March 22, 2007, NFL Network aired America's Game: The Super Bowl Champions, the 1982 Washington Redskins, with team commentary from Russ Grimm, Joe Theismann and Rick Walker, and narrated by Alec Baldwin.

== Offseason ==
=== NFL draft ===
1982 Washington Redskins draft
| Round | Selection | Player | Position | College | Notes |
|---|---|---|---|---|---|
| 1 | 14 | Traded to L.A. Rams | | | |
| 2 | 41 | Traded to New England | | | from San Francisco |
| 2 | 49 | Vernon Dean | CB | San Diego State | from San Diego via L.A. Rams |
| 3 | 61 | Carl Powell | WR | Jackson State | from L.A. Rams |
| 3 | 68 | Traded to New Orleans | | | |
| 4 | 99 | Todd Liebenstein | DE | UNLV | |
| 5 | 125 | Traded to St. Louis | | | |
| 5 | 133 | Mike Williams | TE | Alabama A&M | from Buffalo |
| 6 | 153 | Lemont Holt Jeffers | LB | Tennessee | |
| 7 | 180 | John Schachtner | LB | Northern Arizona | |
| 8 | 211 | Traded to Cleveland | | | |
| 8 | 223 | Ralph Warthen | DT | Gardner-Webb | from San Francisco via New Orleans |
| 9 | 226 | Ken Coffey | S | Southwest Texas State | from New Orleans |
| 9 | 238 | Randy Trautman | DT | Boise State | |
| 10 | 254 | Harold Smith | DE | Kentucky State | |
| 10 | 265 | Terry Daniels | CB | Tennessee | |
| 11 | 281 | Dan Miller | K | Miami (FL) | from New Orleans |
| 11 | 291 | Bob Holly | QB | Princeton | |
| 12 | 309 | Donald Laster | OT | Tennessee State | From New Orleans |
| 12 | 322 | Jeff Goff | LB | Arkansas | |

=== Undrafted free agents ===
1982 undrafted free agents of note
| Player | Position | College |
|---|---|---|
| John Andreoli | Linebacker | Holy Cross |
| Kirk Wilson | Cornerback | Indiana State |

== Personnel ==
=== Coaches / Staff ===
1982 Washington Redskins staff
| Front office: Owner – Jack Kent Cooke; General manager – Bobby Beathard; Head coaches: Head coach – Joe Gibbs; Assistant head coach – Dan Henning; Offensive coaches: Running backs – Don Breaux; Offensive line – Joe Bugel | Defensive coaches: Defensive coordinator – Richie Petitbon; Linebackers – Larry Peccatiello; Special teams coaches: Special teams coordinator – Wayne Sevier; Strength and conditioning: Head athletic trainer – Bubba Tyer; Head strength and conditioning – Dan Riley |

=== Final roster ===
1982 Washington Redskins roster
| Quarterbacks (QB): 12 Bob Holly; 17 Tom Owen; 7 Joe Theismann; Running backs (RB): 30 Nick Giaquinto; 38 Clarence Harmon; 44 John Riggins; 25 Joe Washington; 39 Otis Wonsley; Wide receivers (WR): 87 Charlie Brown; 89 Alvin Garrett; 81 Art Monk; 80 Virgil Seay; Tight ends (TE): 82 Rich Caster; 86 Clint Didier; 88 Rick Walker; 85 Don Warren | Offensive linemen (OL): 53 Jeff Bostic C; 63 Fred Dean G; 68 Russ Grimm G; 66 Joe Jacoby T; 62 Donald Laster T; 73 Mark May G; 71 Garry Puetz T; 74 George Starke T; Defensive linemen (DL): 65 Dave Butz DT; 77 Darryl Grant DT; 79 Todd Liebenstein DE; 72 Dexter Manley DE; 76 Mat Mendenhall DE; 75 Pat Ogrin DT; 78 Tony McGee DE | Linebackers (LB): 58 Stuart Anderson MLB; 51 Monte Coleman OLB; 55 Mel Kaufman OLB; 50 Larry Kubin OLB; 56 Quentin Lowry OLB; 57 Rich Milot OLB; 52 Neal Olkewicz MLB; Defensive backs (DB): 32 Vernon Dean CB; 22 Curtis Jordan SS; 20 Joe Lavender CB; 46 LeCharls McDaniel CB; 29 Mark Murphy FS; 21 Mike Nelms FS; 23 Tony Peters SS; 45 Jeris White CB; 47 Greg Williams FS; Special teams (ST): 5 Jeff Hayes P; 3 Mark Moseley K | Reserve: 69 Perry Brooks DT (IR); 35 Rickey Claitt RB (IR); 48 Ken Coffey S (IR); 28 Cris Crissy CB (IR); 54 Peter Cronan LB (IR); -- Tom Deery S (Left squad); 59 Brad Dusek LB (IR); 26 Reggie Evans RB (IR); 40 Wilbur Jackson RB (IR); 64 Ron Saul G (IR); -- John Schachntner LB (IR); 84 Mike Williams TE (IR); Rookies in italics |

== Preseason ==
| Week | Date | Opponent | Result | Record | Venue | Attendance | NFL.com recap |
|---|---|---|---|---|---|---|---|
| 1 | August 14 | at Miami Dolphins | L 7–24 | 0–1 | Orange Bowl | 45,681 | Recap |
| 2 | August 21 | at Tampa Bay Buccaneers | L 13–28 | 0–2 | Tampa Stadium | 63,896 | Recap |
| 3 | August 27 | Buffalo Bills | L 14–20 | 0–3 | RFK Stadium | 42,514 | Recap |
| 4 | September 3 | at Cincinnati Bengals | L 21–28 | 0–4 | Riverfront Stadium | 43,358 | Recap |

== Preseason Game summaries ==
=== Week P1 (Saturday, August 14, 1982): at Miami Dolphins ===
Week P1: Washington Redskins at Miami Dolphins – Game summary

| Quarter | 1 | 2 | 3 | 4 | Total |
|---|---|---|---|---|---|
| Redskins (0–1) | 7 | 0 | 0 | 0 | 7 |
| Dolphins (1–0) | 0 | 7 | 7 | 10 | 24 |

at Orange Bowl • Miami, Florida

- Date: August 14, 1982
- Game time: 8:00 p.m. EDT
- Game attendance: 45,681
- Referee: Dick Jorgensen
- TV announcers (WJLA-TV): Tim Brant (play-by-play) and Irv Cross (color commentator)

| Team | Category | Player | Statistics |
|---|---|---|---|
| WSH | Passing | | |
| WSH | Rushing | | |
| WSH | Receiving | | |
| MIA | Passing | | |
| MIA | Rushing | | |
| MIA | Receiving | | |

Scoring summary

| Quarter | Time | Drive | | | Team | Scoring information | Score | |
| Quarter | Time | Plays | Yards | TOP | Team | Scoring information | WSH | MIA |
|---|---|---|---|---|---|---|---|---|
| 1 | | | | | Redskins | Riggins 1-yard touchdown run, Miller kick good | 7 | 0 |
| 2 | | | | | Dolphins | Bailey 14-yard touchdown reception from Jensen, Portela kick good | 7 | 7 |
| 3 | | | | | Redskins | Franklin 2-yard touchdown run, Neilsen kick good | 7 | 14 |
| 4 | | | | | Dolphins | 24-yard field goal by Robinson | 7 | 17 |
| 4 | | | | | Dolphins | Fumble recovery returned 26 yards for touchdown by Weaver, Portela kick good | 7 | 24 |
| "TOP" = time of possession. For other American football terms, see Glossary of American football. | | | | | | | 7 | 24 |

- Point spread:
- Over/under:
- Time of game:

| Redskins | Game statistics | Dolphins |
|---|---|---|
| | First downs | |
| | Rushes–yards | |
| | Passing yards | |
| | Passes | |
| | Sacked–yards | |
| | Net passing yards | |
| | Total yards | |
| | Return yards | |
| | Punts | |
| | Fumbles–lost | |
| | Penalties–yards | |
| | Time of possession | |

=== Week P2 (Saturday, August 21, 1982): at Tampa Bay Buccaneers ===
Week P2: Washington Redskins at Tampa Bay Buccaneers – Game summary

| Quarter | 1 | 2 | 3 | 4 | Total |
|---|---|---|---|---|---|
| Redskins (0–2) | 7 | 6 | 0 | 0 | 13 |
| Buccaneers (2–0) | 0 | 0 | 21 | 7 | 28 |

at Tampa Stadium • Tampa, Florida

- Date: August 21, 1982
- Game time: 7:05 p.m. EDT
- Game attendance: 63,896
- Referee: Tom Dooley
- TV announcers (WJLA-TV): Tim Brant (play-by-play) and Irv Cross (color commentator)

| Team | Category | Player | Statistics |
|---|---|---|---|
| WSH | Passing | Joe Theismann | 9/16, 73 YDS, 1 TD, 1 INT |
| WSH | Rushing | John Riggins | 11 CAR, 51 YDS |
| WSH | Receiving | Rich Caster | 2 REC, 43 YDS |
| TB | Passing | Jerry Golsteyn | 8/10, 145 YDS, 3 TDs |
| TB | Rushing | Michael Morton | 12 CAR, 70 YDS |
| TB | Receiving | Gerald Carter | 4 REC, 63 YDS |

Scoring summary

| Quarter | Time | Drive | | | Team | Scoring information | Score | |
| Quarter | Time | Plays | Yards | TOP | Team | Scoring information | WSH | TB |
|---|---|---|---|---|---|---|---|---|
| 1 | 2:20 | 5 | 22 | 2:04 | Redskins | Riggins 3-yard touchdown reception from Theismann, Miller kick good | 7 | 0 |
| 2 | 9:49 | 10 | 50 | 5:42 | Redskins | 39-yard field goal by Moseley | 10 | 0 |
| 2 | 0:00 | 12 | 57 | 3:26 | Redskins | 34-yard field goal by Miller | 13 | 0 |
| 3 | 10:18 | 9 | 80 | 4:42 | Buccaneers | Jones 24-yard touchdown reception from Golsteyn, Smyth kick good | 13 | 7 |
| 3 | 3:08 | 9 | 77 | 5:16 | Buccaneers | Jones 12-yard touchdown reception from Golsteyn, Capece kick good | 13 | 14 |
| 3 | 1:21 | 3 | 30 | 1:17 | Buccaneers | J. Bell 24-yard touchdown reception from Golsteyn, Smyth kick good | 13 | 21 |
| 4 | 9:26 | 8 | 72 | 3:34 | Buccaneers | Ford 2-yard touchdown run, Smyth kick good | 13 | 28 |
| "TOP" = time of possession. For other American football terms, see Glossary of American football. | | | | | | | 13 | 28 |

- Point spread:
- Over/under:
- Time of game: 2 hours, 45 minutes

| Redskins | Game statistics | Buccaneers |
|---|---|---|
| 14 | First downs | 20 |
| 31–134 | Rushes–yards | 34–143 |
| 136 | Passing yards | 250 |
| 16–27–2 | Passes | 18–27–0 |
| 1–10 | Sacked–yards | 3–15 |
| 126 | Net passing yards | 235 |
| 260 | Total yards | 378 |
| 143 | Return yards | 44 |
| 6–44.0 | Punts | 6–36.7 |
| 4–2 | Fumbles–lost | 2–2 |
| 7–63 | Penalties–yards | 4–30 |
| 27:56 | Time of possession | 32:04 |

=== Week P3 (Friday, August 27, 1982): vs. Buffalo Bills ===
Week P3: Buffalo Bills at Washington Redskins – Game summary

| Quarter | 1 | 2 | 3 | 4 | Total |
|---|---|---|---|---|---|
| Bills (2–1) | 0 | 6 | 14 | 0 | 20 |
| Redskins (0–3) | 0 | 0 | 7 | 7 | 14 |

at RFK Stadium • Washington, D.C.

- Date: August 27, 1982
- Game time: 7:30 p.m. EDT
- Game attendance: 42,514
- TV announcers (WJLA-TV): Tim Brant (play-by-play) and Irv Cross (color commentator)

| Team | Category | Player | Statistics |
|---|---|---|---|
| BUF | Passing | | |
| BUF | Rushing | | |
| BUF | Receiving | | |
| WSH | Passing | | |
| WSH | Rushing | | |
| WSH | Receiving | | |

Scoring summary

| Quarter | Time | Drive | | | Team | Scoring information | Score | |
| Quarter | Time | Plays | Yards | TOP | Team | Scoring information | BUF | WSH |
|---|---|---|---|---|---|---|---|---|
| 2 | | | | | Bills | Lewis 6-yard touchdown reception from Ferguson, Anderson kick no good | 6 | 0 |
| 3 | | | | | Bills | Whittington 1-yard touchdown run, Anderson kick good | 13 | 0 |
| 3 | | | | | Redskins | Riggins 1-yard touchdown run, Miller kick good | 13 | 7 |
| 3 | | | | | Bills | Barnett 17-yard touchdown reception from Ferguson, Anderson kick good | 20 | 7 |
| 4 | | | | | Redskins | Riggins 1-yard touchdown run, Moseley kick good | 20 | 14 |
| "TOP" = time of possession. For other American football terms, see Glossary of American football. | | | | | | | 20 | 14 |

- Point spread:
- Over/under:
- Time of game:

| Bills | Game statistics | Redskins |
|---|---|---|
| | First downs | |
| | Rushes–yards | |
| | Passing yards | |
| | Passes | |
| | Sacked–yards | |
| | Net passing yards | |
| | Total yards | |
| | Return yards | |
| | Punts | |
| | Fumbles–lost | |
| | Penalties–yards | |
| | Time of possession | |

=== Week P4 (Friday, September 3, 1982): at Cincinnati Bengals ===
Week P4: Washington Redskins at Cincinnati Bengals – Game summary

| Quarter | 1 | 2 | 3 | 4 | Total |
|---|---|---|---|---|---|
| Redskins (0–4) | 7 | 7 | 7 | 0 | 21 |
| Bengals (1–3) | 7 | 14 | 0 | 7 | 28 |

at Riverfront Stadium • Cincinnati, Ohio

- Date: September 3, 1982
- Game time: 7:30 p.m. EDT
- Game attendance: 43,358
- TV announcers (WJLA-TV): Tim Brant (play-by-play) and Irv Cross (color commentator)

| Team | Category | Player | Statistics |
|---|---|---|---|
| WSH | Passing | | |
| WSH | Rushing | | |
| WSH | Receiving | | |
| CIN | Passing | | |
| CIN | Rushing | | |
| CIN | Receiving | | |

Scoring summary

| Quarter | Time | Drive | | | Team | Scoring information | Score | |
| Quarter | Time | Plays | Yards | TOP | Team | Scoring information | WSH | CIN |
|---|---|---|---|---|---|---|---|---|
| 1 | | | | | Bengals | Curtis 17-yard touchdown reception from Anderson, Breech kick good | 0 | 7 |
| 1 | | | | | Redskins | Jackson 3-yard touchdown run, Miller kick good | 7 | 7 |
| 2 | | | | | Bengals | Kreider 10-yard touchdown reception from Anderson, Breech kick good | 7 | 14 |
| 2 | | | | | Redskins | Jackson 2-yard touchdown run, Miller kick good | 14 | 14 |
| 2 | | | | | Bengals | Collinsworth 38-yard touchdown reception from Anderson, Breech kick good | 14 | 21 |
| 3 | | | | | Redskins | Didier 37-yard touchdown reception from Holly, Miller kick good | 21 | 21 |
| 4 | | | | | Bengals | Curtis 5-yard touchdown reception from Anderson, Breech kick good | 21 | 28 |
| "TOP" = time of possession. For other American football terms, see Glossary of American football. | | | | | | | 21 | 28 |

- Point spread:
- Over/under:
- Time of game:

| Redskins | Game statistics | Bengals |
|---|---|---|
| | First downs | |
| | Rushes–yards | |
| | Passing yards | |
| | Passes | |
| | Sacked–yards | |
| | Net passing yards | |
| | Total yards | |
| | Return yards | |
| | Punts | |
| | Fumbles–lost | |
| | Penalties–yards | |
| | Time of possession | |

== Regular season ==
=== Schedule ===
| Week | Date | Opponent | Result | Record | Game site | Attendance | NFL.com recap |
|---|---|---|---|---|---|---|---|
| 1 | September 12 | at **Philadelphia Eagles** | **W** 37–34 (OT) | 1–0 | Veterans Stadium | 68,885 | Recap |
| 2 | September 19 | at Tampa Bay Buccaneers | **W** 21–13 | 2–0 | Tampa Stadium | 66,187 | Recap |
| —N/a | September 26 | **St. Louis Cardinals** | **Postponed until January 2, 1983 due to the NFLPA Players' strike** | | | | |
| —N/a | October 3 | Cleveland Browns | Cancelled due to the NFLPA Players' strike † | | | | |
| —N/a | October 10 | at Dallas Cowboys | Cancelled due to the NFLPA Players' strike † | | | | |
| —N/a | October 17 | Pittsburgh Steelers | Cancelled due to the NFLPA Players' strike † | | | | |
| —N/a | October 24 | at Houston Oilers | Cancelled due to the NFLPA Players' strike † | | | | |
| —N/a | October 31 | San Francisco 49ers | Cancelled due to the NFLPA Players' strike † | | | | |
| —N/a | November 7 | at Cincinnati Bengals | Cancelled due to the NFLPA Players' strike † | | | | |
| —N/a | November 14 | Minnesota Vikings | Cancelled due to the NFLPA Players' strike † | | | | |
| 3 | November 21 | at **New York Giants** | **W** 27–17 | 3–0 | Giants Stadium | 70,766 | Recap |
| 4 | November 28 | **Philadelphia Eagles** | **W** 13–9 | 4–0 | RFK Stadium | 48,313 | Recap |
| 5 | December 5 | **Dallas Cowboys** | **L** 10–24 | 4–1 | RFK Stadium | 54,633 | Recap |
| 6 | December 12 | at **St. Louis Cardinals** | **W** 12–7 | 5–1 | Busch Memorial Stadium | 35,308 | Recap |
| 7 | December 19 | **New York Giants** | **W** 15–14 | 6–1 | RFK Stadium | 50,030 | Recap |
| 8 | December 26 | at New Orleans Saints | **W** 27–10 | 7–1 | Louisiana Superdome | 48,667 | Recap |
| 9 | January 2 | **St. Louis Cardinals** | **W** 28–0 | 8–1 | RFK Stadium | 55,045 | Recap |
Note: Intra-division opponents are in **bold** text.

== Regular season game summaries ==
=== Week 1 (Sunday, September 12, 1982): at Philadelphia Eagles ===
Week 1: Washington Redskins at Philadelphia Eagles – Game summary

| Quarter | 1 | 2 | 3 | 4 | OT | Total |
|---|---|---|---|---|---|---|
| Redskins (1–0) | 0 | 14 | 0 | 20 | 3 | 37 |
| Eagles (0–1) | 10 | 3 | 14 | 7 | 0 | 34 |

at Veterans Stadium • Philadelphia, Pennsylvania

- Date: September 12, 1982
- Game time: 1:01 p.m. EDT
- Game weather: 74 °F (23.3 °C), relative humidity 65%, wind 6 miles per hour (9.7 km/h; 5.2 kn)
- Game attendance: 68,885
- Referee: Fred Wyant
- TV announcers (CBS): Tom Brookshier (play-by-play) and Wayne Walker (color commentator)

| Team | Category | Player | Statistics |
|---|---|---|---|
| WSH | Passing | Joe Theismann | 28/39, 382 YDS, 3 TDs |
| WSH | Rushing | John Riggins | 20 CAR, 66 YDS, 1 TD |
| WSH | Receiving | Art Monk | 8 REC, 134 YDS, 1 TD |
| PHI | Passing | Ron Jaworski | 27/38, 371 YDS, 2 TDs |
| PHI | Rushing | Wilbert Montgomery | 15 CAR, 63 YDS, 2 TDs |
| PHI | Receiving | Harold Carmichael | 5 REC, 72 YDS, 1 TD |

Scoring summary

| Quarter | Time | Drive | | | Team | Scoring information | Score | |
| Quarter | Time | Plays | Yards | TOP | Team | Scoring information | WSH | PHI |
|---|---|---|---|---|---|---|---|---|
| 1 | 9:08 | 10 | 67 | 4:30 | Eagles | Montgomery 4-yard touchdown run, Franklin kick good | 0 | 7 |
| 1 | 2:41 | 5 | 37 | 2:27 | Eagles | 44-yard field goal by Franklin | 0 | 10 |
| 2 | 2:19 | 11 | 87 | 4:41 | Redskins | Monk 5-yard touchdown reception from Theismann, Moseley kick good | 7 | 10 |
| 2 | 0:35 | 5 | 46 | 1:03 | Redskins | Brown 8-yard touchdown reception from Theismann, Moseley kick good | 14 | 10 |
| 2 | 0:01 | 5 | 53 | 0:34 | Eagles | 44-yard field goal by Franklin | 14 | 13 |
| 3 | 10:16 | 8 | 86 | 4:34 | Eagles | Montgomery 2-yard touchdown run, Franklin kick good | 14 | 20 |
| 3 | 6:15 | 3 | 60 | 1:32 | Eagles | Montgomery 42-yard touchdown reception from Jaworski, Franklin kick good | 14 | 27 |
| 4 | 10:53 | 1 | 78 | 0:11 | Redskins | Brown 78-yard touchdown reception from Theismann, Moseley kick good | 21 | 27 |
| 4 | 6:06 | 5 | 48 | 2:22 | Redskins | Riggins 2-yard touchdown run, Moseley kick good | 28 | 27 |
| 4 | 5:16 | 4 | 9 | 2:22 | Redskins | 30-yard field goal by Moseley | 31 | 27 |
| 4 | 1:04 | 15 | 90 | 1:44 | Eagles | Carmichael 4-yard touchdown reception from Jaworski, Franklin kick good | 31 | 34 |
| 4 | 0:00 | 7 | 32 | 1:04 | Redskins | 48-yard field goal by Moseley | 34 | 34 |
| 5 | 10:13 | 8 | 62 | 4:47 | Redskins | 26-yard field goal by Moseley | 37 | 34 |
| "TOP" = time of possession. For other American football terms, see Glossary of American football. | | | | | | | 37 | 34 |

- Point spread:
- Over/under:
- Time of game: 3 hours, 22 minutes

| Redskins | Game statistics | Eagles |
|---|---|---|
| 26 | First downs | 25 |
| 30–114 | Rushes–yards | 27–101 |
| 382 | Passing yards | 371 |
| 28–39–0 | Passes | 27–38–0 |
| 1–9 | Sacked–yards | 6–46 |
| 373 | Net passing yards | 325 |
| 487 | Total yards | 426 |
| 185 | Return yards | 58 |
| 4–32.3 | Punts | 4–43.5 |
| 3–2 | Fumbles–lost | 1–1 |
| 5–61 | Penalties–yards | 6–39 |
| 36:02 | Time of possession | 28:45 |

Individual stats

- Passing: Theismann – 28/39, 382 YDS, 3 TDs
- Rushing: Riggins – 20 CAR, 66 YDS, 1 TD; Theismann – 3 CAR, 18 YDS; Harmon – 2 CAR, 16 YDS; Monk – 1 CAR, 8 YDS; Jackson – 4 CAR, 6 YDS
- Receiving: Monk – 8 REC, 134 YDS, 1 TD; Brown – 5 REC, 97 YDS, 2 TDs; Warren – 4 REC, 73 YDS; Harmon – 3 REC, 38 YDS; Williams – 3 REC, 14 YDS; Riggins – 3 REC, 3 YDS; Walker – 1 REC, 14 YDS; Jackson – 1 REC, 9 YDS
- Kicking: Moseley – 4/4 PAT, 3/3 FG
- Punting: Hayes – 4 PUNTS, 129 YDS
- Kickoff Return: Nelms – 7 KR, 152 YDS
- Punt Return: Nelms – 3 PR, 33 YDS
- Sacks: Manley – 2.0; McGee – 1.5; Brooks – 1.0; Olkewicz – 1.0; Butz – 0.5

=== Week 2 (Sunday, September 19, 1982): at Tampa Bay Buccaneers ===
Week 2: Washington Redskins at Tampa Bay Buccaneers – Game summary

| Quarter | 1 | 2 | 3 | 4 | Total |
|---|---|---|---|---|---|
| Redskins (2–0) | 9 | 9 | 0 | 3 | 21 |
| Buccaneers (0–2) | 0 | 6 | 0 | 7 | 13 |

at Tampa Stadium • Tampa, Florida

- Date: September 19, 1982
- Game time: 4:05 p.m. EDT
- Game weather: 80 °F (26.7 °C), relative humidity 80%, wind 8 miles per hour (13 km/h; 7.0 kn)
- Game attendance: 66,187
- Referee: Gordon McCarter
- TV announcers (CBS): Frank Glieber (play-by-play) and Joe Greene (color commentator)

| Team | Category | Player | Statistics |
|---|---|---|---|
| WSH | Passing | Joe Theismann | 12/20, 112 YDS, 1 TD |
| WSH | Rushing | John Riggins | 34 CAR, 136 YDS |
| WSH | Receiving | Art Monk | 4 REC, 41 YDS |
| TB | Passing | Doug Williams | 14/27, 199 YDS, 1 TD |
| TB | Rushing | Doug Williams | 9 CAR, 49 YDS |
| TB | Receiving | James Wilder | 5 REC, 46 YDS |

Scoring summary

| Quarter | Time | Drive | | | Team | Scoring information | Score | |
| Quarter | Time | Plays | Yards | TOP | Team | Scoring information | WSH | TB |
|---|---|---|---|---|---|---|---|---|
| 1 | 3:05 | 10 | 60 | 4:55 | Redskins | Brown 8-yard touchdown reception from Theismann, Moseley kick no good | 6 | 0 |
| 1 | 0:09 | 6 | 10 | 2:01 | Redskins | 35-yard field goal by Moseley | 9 | 0 |
| 2 | 14:49 | 2 | 70 | 0:20 | Buccaneers | House 62-yard touchdown reception from Williams, Capece kick no good | 9 | 6 |
| 2 | 6:25 | 4 | 8 | 0:52 | Redskins | 21-yard field goal by Moseley | 12 | 6 |
| 2 | 5:20 | — | — | — | Redskins | Jordan recovered blocked punt in end zone, Moseley kick no good | 18 | 6 |
| 4 | 13:56 | 7 | 54 | 2:39 | Buccaneers | Wilder 7-yard touchdown run, Capece kick good | 18 | 13 |
| 4 | 4:16 | 16 | 63 | 9:40 | Redskins | 19-yard field goal by Moseley | 21 | 13 |
| "TOP" = time of possession. For other American football terms, see Glossary of American football. | | | | | | | 21 | 13 |

- Point spread:
- Over/under:
- Time of game: 2 hours, 55 minutes

| Redskins | Game statistics | Buccaneers |
|---|---|---|
| 18 | First downs | 14 |
| 45–177 | Rushes–yards | 28–101 |
| 112 | Passing yards | 199 |
| 12–20–0 | Passes | 14–27–0 |
| 6–41 | Sacked–yards | 2–22 |
| 71 | Net passing yards | 177 |
| 248 | Total yards | 278 |
| 76 | Return yards | 149 |
| 7–40.6 | Punts | 6–31.7 |
| 1–0 | Fumbles–lost | 5–4 |
| 3–23 | Penalties–yards | 5–32 |
| 36:37 | Time of possession | 23:23 |

Individual stats

- Passing: Theismann – 12/29, 112 YDS, 1 TD
- Rushing: Riggins – 34 CAR, 136 YDS; Wonsley – 6 CAR, 22 YDS; Harmon – 3 CAR, 13 YDS; Theismann – 2 CAR, 6 YDS
- Receiving: Monk – 4 REC, 41 YDS; Brown – 3 REC, 33 YDS; Riggins – 2 REC, 15 YDS; Warren – 2 REC, 15 YDS; Didier – 1 REC, 8 YDS
- Kicking: Moseley – 0/2 PAT, 3/3 FG
- Punting: Hayes – 7 PUNTS, 284 YDS
- Kickoff Return: Nelms – 2 KR, 41 YDS; Williams – 1 KR, 2 YDS
- Punt Return: Nelms – 4 PR, 33 YDS
- Sacks: Manley – 1.0; McGee – 1.0

=== Week 3 (Sunday, November 21, 1982): at New York Giants ===
Week 3: Washington Redskins at New York Giants – Game summary

| Quarter | 1 | 2 | 3 | 4 | Total |
|---|---|---|---|---|---|
| Redskins (3–0) | 7 | 14 | 3 | 3 | 27 |
| Giants (0–3) | 0 | 3 | 7 | 7 | 17 |

at Giants Stadium • East Rutherford, New Jersey

- Date: November 21, 1982
- Game time: 4:00 p.m. EST
- Game weather: 50 °F (10 °C), relative humidity 90%, wind 9 miles per hour (14 km/h; 7.8 kn)
- Game attendance: 70,766
- Referee: Jim Tunney
- TV announcers (CBS): Pat Summerall (play-by-play) and John Madden (color commentator)

| Team | Category | Player | Statistics |
|---|---|---|---|
| WSH | Passing | Joe Theismann | 16/24, 185 YDS, 2 TDs |
| WSH | Rushing | John Riggins | 28 CAR, 70 YDS, 1 TD |
| WSH | Receiving | Art Monk | 6 REC, 42 YDS |
| NYG | Passing | Scott Brunner | 14/28, 169 YDS, 1 TD, 1 INT |
| NYG | Rushing | Butch Woolfolk | 12 CAR, 62 YDS |
| NYG | Receiving | Johnny Perkins | 5 REC, 88 YDS, 1 TD |

Scoring summary

| Quarter | Time | Drive | | | Team | Scoring information | Score | |
| Quarter | Time | Plays | Yards | TOP | Team | Scoring information | WSH | NYG |
|---|---|---|---|---|---|---|---|---|
| 1 | | | | | Redskins | Wonsley 1-yard touchdown reception from Theismann, Moseley kick good | 7 | 0 |
| 2 | | | | | Redskins | Brown 39-yard touchdown reception from Theismann, Moseley kick good | 14 | 0 |
| 2 | | | | | Redskins | Riggins 2-yard touchdown run, Moseley kick good | 21 | 0 |
| 2 | | | | | Giants | 20-yard field goal by Danelo | 21 | 3 |
| 3 | | | | | Giants | Perkins 26-yard touchdown reception from Brunner, Danelo kick good | 21 | 10 |
| 3 | | | | | Redskins | 37-yard field goal by Moseley | 24 | 10 |
| 4 | | | | | Giants | Chatman 1-yard touchdown run, Danelo kick good | 24 | 17 |
| 4 | | | | | Redskins | 29-yard field goal by Moseley | 27 | 17 |
| "TOP" = time of possession. For other American football terms, see Glossary of American football. | | | | | | | 27 | 17 |

- Point spread:
- Over/under:
- Time of game:

| Redskins | Game statistics | Giants |
|---|---|---|
| 19 | First downs | 20 |
| 40–139 | Rushes–yards | 31–136 |
| 185 | Passing yards | 169 |
| 16–24–0 | Passes | 14–28–1 |
| 1–12 | Sacked–yards | 3–18 |
| 173 | Net passing yards | 151 |
| 312 | Total yards | 287 |
| 148 | Return yards | 93 |
| 4–41.0 | Punts | 4–44.0 |
| 2–0 | Fumbles–lost | 3–0 |
| 5–35 | Penalties–yards | 4–25 |
| 25:39 | Time of possession | 34:21 |

Individual stats

- Passing: Theismann – 16/24, 185 YDS, 2 TDs
- Rushing: Riggins – 28 CAR, 70 YDS, 1 TD; Harmon – 4 CAR, 33 YDS; Theismann – 4 CAR, 19 YDS; Monk – 2 CAR, 14 YDS; Washington – 1 CAR, 2 YDS; Wonsley – 1 CAR, 1 YD
- Receiving: Monk – 6 REC, 42 YDS; Brown – 3 REC, 27 YDS, 1 TD; Seay – 2 REC, 71 TDS; Riggins – 2 REC, 3 YDS; Harmon – 1 REC, 7 YDS; Warren – 1 REC, 4 YDS; Wonsley – 1 REC, 1 YD
- Kicking: Moseley – 3/3 PAT, 2/2 FG
- Punting: Hayes – 4 PUNTS, 164 YDS
- Kickoff Return: Nelms – 4 KR, 127 YDS
- Punt Return: Nelms – 3 PR, 23 YDS
- Sacks: Butz – 1.0; Manley – 1.0; McGee – 1.0
- Interceptions: Manley – 1 INT, –2 YDS

=== Week 4 (Sunday, November 28, 1982): vs. Philadelphia Eagles ===
Week 4: Philadelphia Eagles at Washington Redskins – Game summary

| Quarter | 1 | 2 | 3 | 4 | Total |
|---|---|---|---|---|---|
| Eagles (1–3) | 0 | 0 | 9 | 0 | 9 |
| Redskins (4–0) | 3 | 7 | 3 | 0 | 13 |

at RFK Stadium • Washington, D.C.

- Date: November 28, 1982
- Game time: 1:00 p.m. EST
- Game weather: 38 °F (3.3 °C), relative humidity 67%, wind 6 miles per hour (9.7 km/h; 5.2 kn)
- Game attendance: 48,313
- Referee: Ben Dreith
- TV announcers (CBS): Tom Brookshier (play-by-play) and Wayne Walker (color commentator)

| Team | Category | Player | Statistics |
|---|---|---|---|
| PHI | Passing | Ron Jaworski | 18/42, 233 YDS, 1 TD, 4 INTs |
| PHI | Rushing | Perry Harrington | 15 CAR, 86 YDS |
| PHI | Receiving | Harold Carmichael | 6 REC, 109 YDS, 1 TD |
| WSH | Passing | Joe Theismann | 14/28, 259 YDS, 1 TD, 2 INTs |
| WSH | Rushing | John Riggins | 20 CAR, 52 YDS |
| WSH | Receiving | Don Warren | 4 REC, 34 YDS |

Scoring summary

| Quarter | Time | Drive | | | Team | Scoring information | Score | |
| Quarter | Time | Plays | Yards | TOP | Team | Scoring information | PHI | WSH |
|---|---|---|---|---|---|---|---|---|
| 1 | | | | | Redskins | 45-yard field goal by Moseley | 0 | 3 |
| 2 | | | | | Redskins | Brown 65-yard touchdown reception from Theismann, Moseley kick good | 0 | 10 |
| 3 | | | | | Eagles | 41-yard field goal by Franklin | 3 | 10 |
| 3 | | | | | Eagles | Carmichael 44-yard touchdown reception from Jaworski, Franklin kick no good | 9 | 10 |
| 3 | | | | | Redskins | 43-yard field goal by Moseley | 9 | 13 |
| "TOP" = time of possession. For other American football terms, see Glossary of American football. | | | | | | | 9 | 13 |

- Point spread:
- Over/under:
- Time of game: 2 hours, 57 minutes

| Eagles | Game statistics | Redskins |
|---|---|---|
| 17 | First downs | 15 |
| 23–101 | Rushes–yards | 31–61 |
| 233 | Passing yards | 250 |
| 18–42–4 | Passes | 14–28–2 |
| 2–15 | Sacked–yards | 4–25 |
| 218 | Net passing yards | 225 |
| 319 | Total yards | 295 |
| 85 | Return yards | 120 |
| 5–36.0 | Punts | 7–27.7 |
| 4–1 | Fumbles–lost | 2–1 |
| 1–5 | Penalties–yards | 4–30 |
| 27:24 | Time of possession | 32:36 |

Individual stats

- Passing: Theismann – 14/28, 259 YDS, 1 TD, 2 INTs
- Rushing: Riggins – 20 CAR, 52 YDS; Walker – 2 CAR, 11 YDS; Washington – 1 CAR, 3 YDS; Theismann – 7 CAR, 1 YD; Monk – 1 CAR, –6 YDS
- Receiving: Warren – 4 REC, 34 YDS; Brown – 3 REC, 124 YDS, 1 TD; Seay – 2 REC, 37 YDS; Harmon – 2 REC, 14 YDS; Giaquinto – 1 REC, 29 YDS; Riggins – 1 REC, 11 YDS; Monk – 1 REC, 10 YDS
- Kicking: Moseley – 1/1 PAT, 2/2 FG
- Punting: Hayes – 7 PUNTS, 194 YDS
- Kickoff Return: Nelms – 3 KR, 89 YDS
- Punt Return: Nelms – 4 PR, 17 YDS
- Sacks: Butz – 1.0; Olkewicz – 1.0
- Interceptions: White – 2 INTs, 0 YDS; Peters – 1 INT, 14 YDS; Murphy – 1 INT, 0 YDS

=== Week 5 (Sunday, December 5, 1982): vs. Dallas Cowboys ===
Week 5: Dallas Cowboys at Washington Redskins – Game summary

| Quarter | 1 | 2 | 3 | 4 | Total |
|---|---|---|---|---|---|
| Cowboys (4–1) | 0 | 7 | 10 | 7 | 24 |
| Redskins (4–1) | 0 | 0 | 0 | 10 | 10 |

at RFK Stadium • Washington, D.C.

- Date: December 5, 1982
- Game time: 4:00 p.m. EST
- Game weather: 64 °F (17.8 °C), relative humidity 81%, wind 9 miles per hour (14 km/h; 7.8 kn)
- Game attendance: 54,633
- Referee: Jerry Markbreit
- TV announcers (CBS): Pat Summerall (play-by-play) and John Madden (color commentator)

| Team | Category | Player | Statistics |
|---|---|---|---|
| DAL | Passing | Danny White | 21/29, 216 YDS, 1 TD, 1 INT |
| DAL | Rushing | Tony Dorsett | 26 CAR, 57 YDS |
| DAL | Receiving | Tony Hill | 6 REC, 77 YDS |
| WSH | Passing | Joe Theismann | 19/29, 234 YDS, 1 TD, 3 INTs |
| WSH | Rushing | Joe Washington | 6 CAR, 32 YDS |
| WSH | Receiving | Art Monk | 7 REC, 100 YDS |

Scoring summary

| Quarter | Time | Drive | | | Team | Scoring information | Score | |
| Quarter | Time | Plays | Yards | TOP | Team | Scoring information | DAL | WSH |
|---|---|---|---|---|---|---|---|---|
| 2 | 12:27 | 10 | 76 | | Cowboys | Springs 8-yard touchdown reception from White, Septién kick good | 7 | 0 |
| 3 | 11:02 | 11 | 52 | | Cowboys | 31-yard field goal by Septién | 10 | 0 |
| 3 | 4:59 | 8 | 80 | | Cowboys | Newsome 18-yard touchdown run, Septién kick good | 17 | 0 |
| 4 | 14:50 | 10 | 56 | | Redskins | 38-yard field goal by Moseley | 17 | 3 |
| 4 | 9:45 | 5 | 52 | | Redskins | Brown 17-yard touchdown reception from Theismann, Moseley kick good | 17 | 10 |
| 4 | 1:52 | 6 | 70 | | Cowboys | Springs 46-yard touchdown run, Septién kick good | 24 | 10 |
| "TOP" = time of possession. For other American football terms, see Glossary of American football. | | | | | | | 24 | 10 |

- Point spread:
- Over/under:
- Time of game:

| Cowboys | Game statistics | Redskins |
|---|---|---|
| 22 | First downs | 15 |
| 38–160 | Rushes–yards | 17–66 |
| 216 | Passing yards | 269 |
| 21–30–2 | Passes | 20–30–3 |
| 1–14 | Sacked–yards | 7–60 |
| 202 | Net passing yards | 209 |
| 362 | Total yards | 275 |
| 88 | Return yards | 178 |
| 4–41.0 | Punts | 5–32.4 |
| 2–0 | Fumbles–lost | 0–0 |
| 7–52 | Penalties–yards | 3–40 |
| 32:26 | Time of possession | 27:34 |

Individual stats

- Passing: Theismann – 19/29, 234 YDS, 1 TD, 3 INTs; Washington – 1/1, 35 YDS
- Rushing: Washington – 6 CAR, 32 YDS; Riggins – 9 CAR, 26 YDS; Theismann – 1 CAR, 8 YDS; Wonsley – 1 CAR, 0 YDS
- Receiving: Monk – 7 REC, 100 YDS; Warren – 5 REC, 59 YDS; Washington – 3 REC, 26 YDS; Brown – 2 REC, 52 YDS; Seay – 1 REC, 24 YDS; Harmon – 1 REC, 7 YDS; Walker – 1 REC, 1 YD
- Kicking: Moseley – 1/1 PAT, 1/1 FG
- Punting: Hayes – 5 PUNTS, 162 YDS
- Kickoff Return: Nelms – 5 KR, 129 YDS
- Punt Return: Nelms – 2 PR, 6 YDS
- Sacks: Manley – 1.0
- Interceptions: Dean – 2 INTs, 43 YDS

=== Week 6 (Sunday, December 12, 1982): at St. Louis Cardinals ===
Week 6: Washington Redskins at St. Louis Cardinals – Game summary

| Quarter | 1 | 2 | 3 | 4 | Total |
|---|---|---|---|---|---|
| Redskins (5–1) | 3 | 3 | 3 | 3 | 12 |
| Cardinals (3–3) | 0 | 0 | 0 | 7 | 7 |

at Busch Memorial Stadium • St. Louis, Missouri

- Date: December 12, 1982
- Game time: 1:00 p.m. EST
- Game weather: 19 °F (−7.2 °C), relative humidity 70%, wind 10 miles per hour (16 km/h; 8.7 kn), wind chill 8 °F (−13.3 °C)
- Game attendance: 35,308
- Referee: Jerry Seeman
- TV announcers (CBS): Tom Brookshier (play-by-play) and Wayne Walker (color commentator)

| Team | Category | Player | Statistics |
|---|---|---|---|
| WSH | Passing | Joe Theismann | 17/26, 188 YDS |
| WSH | Rushing | John Riggins | 25 CAR, 89 YDS |
| WSH | Receiving | Joe Washington | 8 REC, 78 YDS |
| STL | Passing | Neil Lomax | 8/14, 160 YDS |
| STL | Rushing | Ottis Anderson | 15 CAR, 109 YDS |
| STL | Receiving | Pat Tilley | 6 REC, 95 YDS |

Scoring summary

| Quarter | Time | Drive | | | Team | Scoring information | Score | |
| Quarter | Time | Plays | Yards | TOP | Team | Scoring information | WSH | STL |
|---|---|---|---|---|---|---|---|---|
| 1 | | | | | Redskins | 32-yard field goal by Moseley | 3 | 0 |
| 2 | | | | | Redskins | 30-yard field goal by Moseley | 6 | 0 |
| 3 | | | | | Redskins | 20-yard field goal by Moseley | 9 | 0 |
| 4 | | | | | Redskins | 24-yard field goal by Moseley | 12 | 0 |
| 4 | | | | | Cardinals | LaFleur 5-yard touchdown reception from Hart, O'Donoghue kick good | 12 | 7 |
| "TOP" = time of possession. For other American football terms, see Glossary of American football. | | | | | | | 12 | 7 |

- Point spread:
- Over/under:
- Time of game:

| Redskins | Game statistics | Cardinals |
|---|---|---|
| 18 | First downs | 19 |
| 35–122 | Rushes–yards | 25–131 |
| 188 | Passing yards | 251 |
| 17–26–0 | Passes | 15–26–0 |
| 2–18 | Sacked–yards | 3–26 |
| 170 | Net passing yards | 225 |
| 292 | Total yards | 356 |
| 35 | Return yards | 100 |
| 3–41.3 | Punts | 2–40.5 |
| 2–1 | Fumbles–lost | 3–3 |
| 9–65 | Penalties–yards | 8–65 |
| 32:41 | Time of possession | 27:19 |

Individual stats

- Passing: Theismann – 17/26, 188 YDS
- Rushing: Riggins – 25 CAR, 89 YDS; Washington – 5 CAR, 15 YDS; Theismann – 1 CAR, 11 YDS; Harmon – 1 CAR, 4 YDS; Monk – 2 CAR, 3 YDS
- Receiving: Washington – 8 REC, 78 YDS; Warren – 3 REC, 33 YDS; Brown – 2 REC, 47 YDS; Walker – 2 REC, 15 YDS; Riggins – 1 REC, 11 YDS; Harmon – 1 REC, 4 YDS
- Kicking: Moseley – 4/4 FG
- Punting: Hayes – 3 PUNTS, 123 YDS
- Kickoff Return: Garrett – 1 KR, 17 YDS; Nelms – 1 KR, 9 YDS
- Punt Return: Williams – 1 PR, 9 YDS; Nelms – 1 PR, 0 YDS
- Sacks: Butz – 1.0; McGee – 1.0; Grant – 0.5; Manley – 0.5

=== Week 7 (Sunday, December 19, 1982): vs. New York Giants ===
Week 7: New York Giants at Washington Redskins – Game summary

| Quarter | 1 | 2 | 3 | 4 | Total |
|---|---|---|---|---|---|
| Giants (3–4) | 7 | 7 | 0 | 0 | 14 |
| Redskins (6–1) | 0 | 3 | 6 | 6 | 15 |

at RFK Stadium • Washington, D.C.

- Date: December 19, 1982
- Game time: 1:00 p.m. EST
- Game weather: 32 °F (0 °C), relative humidity 73%, wind 6 miles per hour (9.7 km/h; 5.2 kn), wind chill 26 °F (−3.3 °C)
- Game attendance: 50,030
- Referee: Fred Wyant
- TV announcers (CBS): Jack Buck (play-by-play) and Hank Stram (color commentator)

| Team | Category | Player | Statistics |
|---|---|---|---|
| NYG | Passing | Scott Brunner | 10/26, 128 YDS, 1 TD |
| NYG | Rushing | Rob Carpenter | 10 CAR, 28 YDS |
| NYG | Receiving | Earnest Gray | 3 REC, 36 YDS |
| WSH | Passing | Joe Theismann | 25/38, 252 YDS, 4 INTs |
| WSH | Rushing | John Riggins | 31 CAR, 87 YDS |
| WSH | Receiving | Charlie Brown | 7 REC, 96 YDS |

Scoring summary

| Quarter | Time | Drive | | | Team | Scoring information | Score | |
| Quarter | Time | Plays | Yards | TOP | Team | Scoring information | NYG | WSH |
|---|---|---|---|---|---|---|---|---|
| 1 | | | | | Giants | Perkins 28-yard touchdown reception from Brunner, Danelo kick good | 7 | 0 |
| 2 | | | | | Redskins | 20-yard field goal by Moseley | 7 | 3 |
| 2 | | | | | Giants | Woolfolk 1-yard touchdown run, Danelo kick good | 14 | 3 |
| 3 | | | | | Redskins | Washington 22-yard touchdown run, Moseley kick no good | 14 | 9 |
| 4 | | | | | Redskins | 31-yard field goal by Moseley | 14 | 12 |
| 4 | | | | | Redskins | 42-yard field goal by Moseley | 14 | 15 |
| "TOP" = time of possession. For other American football terms, see Glossary of American football. | | | | | | | 14 | 15 |

- Point spread:
- Over/under:
- Time of game:

| Giants | Game statistics | Redskins |
|---|---|---|
| 10 | First downs | 20 |
| 20–55 | Rushes–yards | 41–134 |
| 128 | Passing yards | 252 |
| 10–26–0 | Passes | 25–38–4 |
| 5–44 | Sacked–yards | 1–11 |
| 84 | Net passing yards | 241 |
| 139 | Total yards | 375 |
| 143 | Return yards | 76 |
| 10–37.8 | Punts | 4–41.8 |
| 2–2 | Fumbles–lost | 2–1 |
| 4–35 | Penalties–yards | 5–43 |
| 21:41 | Time of possession | 38:19 |

Individual stats

- Passing: Theismann – 25/38, 252 YDS, 4 INTs
- Rushing: Riggins – 31 CAR, 87 YDS; Washington – 3 CAR, 26 YDS, 1 TD; Theismann – 6 CAR, 21 YDS; Harmon – 1 CAR, 0 YDS
- Receiving: Brown – 7 REC, 96 YDS; Washington – 5 REC, 28 YDS; Monk – 4 REC, 60 YDS; Warren – 4 REC, 33 YDS; Walker – 4 REC, 28 YDS; Riggins – 1 REC, 7 YDS
- Kicking: Moseley – 0/1 PAT, 3/3 FG
- Punting: Hayes – 4 PUNTS, 167 YDS
- Kickoff Return: Garrett – 1 KR, 18 YDS; Wonsley – 1 KR, 14 YDS; Nelms – 1 KR, 10 YDS
- Punt Return: Nelms – 5 PR, 34 YDS
- Sacks: Milot – 3.0; Kaufman – 1.0; Kubin – 0.5; Olkewicz – 0.5

=== Week 8 (Sunday, December 26, 1982): at New Orleans Saints ===
Week 8: Washington Redskins at New Orleans Saints – Game summary

| Quarter | 1 | 2 | 3 | 4 | Total |
|---|---|---|---|---|---|
| Redskins (7–1) | 7 | 10 | 0 | 10 | 27 |
| Saints (3–5) | 0 | 7 | 3 | 0 | 10 |

at Louisiana Superdome • New Orleans, Louisiana

- Date: December 26, 1982
- Game time: 4:00 p.m. EST
- Game weather: indoors (dome)
- Game attendance: 48,667
- Referee: Chuck Heberling
- TV announcers (CBS): Tom Brookshier (play-by-play) and Wayne Walker (color commentator)

| Team | Category | Player | Statistics |
|---|---|---|---|
| WSH | Passing | Joe Theismann | 14/23, 264 YDS, 2 TDs |
| WSH | Rushing | Joe Washington | 15 CAR, 67 YDS |
| WSH | Receiving | Art Monk | 5 REC, 60 YDS |
| NO | Passing | Guido Merkens | 9/24, 104 YDS, 1 INT |
| NO | Rushing | Wayne Wilson | 15 CAR, 56 YDS |
| NO | Receiving | Jeff Groth | 3 REC, 31 YDS |

Scoring summary

| Quarter | Time | Drive | | | Team | Scoring information | Score | |
| Quarter | Time | Plays | Yards | TOP | Team | Scoring information | WSH | NO |
|---|---|---|---|---|---|---|---|---|
| 1 | | | | | Redskins | Brown 57-yard touchdown reception from Theismann, Moseley kick good | 7 | 0 |
| 2 | | | | | Saints | Rogers 4-yard touchdown run, Andersen kick good | 7 | 7 |
| 2 | | | | | Redskins | Brown 58-yard touchdown reception from Theismann, Moseley kick good | 14 | 7 |
| 2 | | | | | Redskins | 36-yard field goal by Moseley | 17 | 7 |
| 3 | | | | | Saints | 36-yard field goal by Andersen | 17 | 10 |
| 4 | | | | | Redskins | 45-yard field goal by Moseley | 20 | 10 |
| 4 | | | | | Redskins | Riggins 1-yard touchdown run, Moseley kick good | 27 | 10 |
| "TOP" = time of possession. For other American football terms, see Glossary of American football. | | | | | | | 27 | 10 |

- Point spread:
- Over/under:
- Time of game:

| Redskins | Game statistics | Saints |
|---|---|---|
| 16 | First downs | 14 |
| 37–198 | Rushes–yards | 35–120 |
| 264 | Passing yards | 104 |
| 14–23–0 | Passes | 9–24–1 |
| 3–14 | Sacked–yards | 5–27 |
| 250 | Net passing yards | 77 |
| 448 | Total yards | 197 |
| 134 | Return yards | 72 |
| 7–45.9 | Punts | 11–44.6 |
| 3–2 | Fumbles–lost | 1–0 |
| 8–86 | Penalties–yards | 4–33 |
| 29:05 | Time of possession | 30:55 |

Individual stats

- Passing: Theismann – 14/23, 264 YDS, 2 TDs
- Rushing: Washington – 15 CAR, 67 YDS; Theismann – 5 CAR, 58 YDS; Harmon – 6 CAR, 39 YDS; Riggins – 9 CAR, 27 YDS; Giaquinto – 1 CAR, 5 YDS; Monk – 1 CAR, 2 YDS
- Receiving: Monk – 5 REC, 60 YDS; Brown – 4 REC, 156 YDS, 2 TDs; Warren – 2 REC, 32 YDS; Seay – 1 REC, 22 YDS; Walker – 1 REC, –3 YDS; Washington – 1 REC, –3 YDS
- Kicking: Moseley – 3/3 PAT, 2/2 FG
- Punting: Hayes – 7 PUNTS, 321 YDS
- Kickoff Return: Giaquinto – 1 KR, 21 YDS; Anderson – 1 KR, 7 YDS
- Punt Return: Nelms – 10 PR, 106 YDS
- Sacks: Grant – 1.0; Liebenstein – 1.0; Manley – 1.0; McGee – 1.0; Mendenhall – 1.0
- Interceptions: Murphy – 1 INT, 0 YDS

=== Week 9 (Sunday, January 2, 1983): vs. St. Louis Cardinals ===
Week 9: St. Louis Cardinals at Washington Redskins – Game summary

| Quarter | 1 | 2 | 3 | 4 | Total |
|---|---|---|---|---|---|
| Cardinals (5–4) | 0 | 0 | 0 | 0 | 0 |
| Redskins (8–1) | 7 | 7 | 7 | 7 | 28 |

at RFK Stadium • Washington, D.C.

- Date: January 2, 1983
- Game time: 1:00 p.m. EST
- Game weather: 41 °F (5 °C), relative humidity 72%, wind 4 miles per hour (6.4 km/h; 3.5 kn)
- Game attendance: 52,544
- Referee: Gordon McCarter
- TV announcers (CBS): Jack Buck (play-by-play) and Hank Stram (color commentator)

| Team | Category | Player | Statistics |
|---|---|---|---|
| STL | Passing | Neil Lomax | 18/34, 199 YDS, 3 INTs |
| STL | Rushing | Ottis Anderson | 10 CAR, 31 YDS |
| STL | Receiving | Pat Tilley | 4 REC, 65 YDS |
| WSH | Passing | Joe Theismann | 16/25, 157 YDS, 3 TDs |
| WSH | Rushing | Clarence Harmon | 21 CAR, 63 YDS, 1 TD |
| WSH | Receiving | Rick Walker | 3 REC, 37 TDS, 1 TD |

Scoring summary

| Quarter | Time | Drive | | | Team | Scoring information | Score | |
| Quarter | Time | Plays | Yards | TOP | Team | Scoring information | STL | WSH |
|---|---|---|---|---|---|---|---|---|
| 1 | | | | | Redskins | Walker 25-yard touchdown reception from Theismann, Moseley kick good | 0 | 7 |
| 2 | | | | | Redskins | Didier 2-yard touchdown reception from Theismann, Moseley kick good | 0 | 14 |
| 3 | | | | | Redskins | Harmon 1-yard touchdown run, Moseley kick good | 0 | 21 |
| 4 | | | | | Redskins | Washington 8-yard touchdown reception from Theismann, Moseley kick good | 0 | 28 |
| "TOP" = time of possession. For other American football terms, see Glossary of American football. | | | | | | | 0 | 28 |

- Point spread:
- Over/under:
- Time of game:

| Cardinals | Game statistics | Redskins |
|---|---|---|
| 10 | First downs | 18 |
| 20–41 | Rushes–yards | 39–129 |
| 199 | Passing yards | 157 |
| 18–34–3 | Passes | 16–25–0 |
| 5–44 | Sacked–yards | 5–33 |
| 155 | Net passing yards | 124 |
| 196 | Total yards | 253 |
| 112 | Return yards | 77 |
| 10–41.3 | Punts | 10–39.2 |
| 2–2 | Fumbles–lost | 0–0 |
| 13–133 | Penalties–yards | 4–30 |
| 25:10 | Time of possession | 34:50 |

Individual stats

- Passing: Theismann – 16/25, 157 YDS, 3 TDs
- Rushing: Clarence Harmon – 21 CAR, 63 YDS, 1 TD; Washington – 13 CAR, 45 YDS; Wonsley – 3 CAR, 13 YDS; Theismann – 2 CAR, 8 YDS
- Receiving: Walker – 3 REC, 37 YDS, 1 TD; Brown – 3 REC, 28 YDS; Harmon – 3 REC, 18 YDS; Warren – 2 REC, 27 YDS; Washington – 2 REC, 5 YDS; Giaquinto – 1 REC, 36 YDS; Garrett – 1 REC, 6 YDS; Didier – 1 REC, 2 YDS
- Kicking: Moseley – 4/4 PAT, 0/1 FG
- Punting: Hayes – 10 PUNTS, 392 YDS
- Kickoff Return: Harmon – 1 KR, 13 YDS
- Punt Return: Giaquinto – 5 PR, 34 YDS
- Sacks: Butz – 1.0; Grant – 1.0; McGee – 1.0; Murphy – 1.0; Kaufman – 0.5; Olkewicz – 0.5
- Interceptions: Dean – 1 INT, 19 YDS; McDaniel – 1 INT, 7 YDS, White – 1 INT, 4 YDS
- Redskins Missed Field Goals: Moseley 40

== Standings ==
NFC East
| | W | L | T | PCT | DIV | CONF | PF | PA | STK |
|---|---|---|---|---|---|---|---|---|---|
| ^{(1)} Washington Redskins | 8 | 1 | 0 | .889 | 6–1 | 8–1 | 190 | 128 | W4 |
| ^{(2)} Dallas Cowboys | 6 | 3 | 0 | .667 | 2–1 | 4–2 | 226 | 145 | L2 |
| ^{(6)} St. Louis Cardinals | 5 | 4 | 0 | .556 | 3–1 | 5–4 | 135 | 170 | L1 |
| New York Giants | 4 | 5 | 0 | .444 | 2–3 | 3–5 | 164 | 160 | W1 |
| Philadelphia Eagles | 3 | 6 | 0 | .333 | 1–5 | 1–5 | 191 | 195 | L1 |

NFC
| # | Team | W | L | T | PCT | PF | PA | STK |
|---|---|---|---|---|---|---|---|---|
Seeded postseason qualifiers
| 1 | Washington Redskins | 8 | 1 | 0 | .889 | 190 | 128 | W4 |
| 2 | Dallas Cowboys | 6 | 3 | 0 | .667 | 226 | 145 | L2 |
| 3 | Green Bay Packers | 5 | 3 | 1 | .611 | 226 | 169 | L1 |
| 4 (Note: Minnesota (4–1), Atlanta (4–3), St. Louis (5–4), Tampa Bay (3–3) seeds were determined by best won-lost record in conference games.) | Minnesota Vikings | 5 | 4 | 0 | .556 | 187 | 198 | W1 |
| 5 | Atlanta Falcons | 5 | 4 | 0 | .556 | 183 | 199 | L2 |
| 6 | St. Louis Cardinals | 5 | 4 | 0 | .556 | 135 | 170 | L1 |
| 7 | Tampa Bay Buccaneers | 5 | 4 | 0 | .556 | 158 | 178 | W3 |
| 8 (Note: Detroit finished ahead of New Orleans and the N.Y. Giants based on best conference record (4–4 to Saints’ 3–5 to Giants’ 3–5).) | Detroit Lions | 4 | 5 | 0 | .444 | 181 | 176 | W1 |
Did not qualify for the postseason
| 9 | New Orleans Saints | 4 | 5 | 0 | .444 | 129 | 160 | W1 |
| 10 | New York Giants | 4 | 5 | 0 | .444 | 164 | 160 | W1 |
| 11 (Note: San Francisco finished ahead of Chicago, and Chicago finished ahead of Philadelphia, based on conference record (49ers’ 2–3 to Bears’ 2–5 to Eagles’ 1–5).) | San Francisco 49ers | 3 | 6 | 0 | .333 | 209 | 206 | L1 |
| 12 | Chicago Bears | 3 | 6 | 0 | .333 | 141 | 174 | L1 |
| 13 | Philadelphia Eagles | 3 | 6 | 0 | .333 | 191 | 195 | L1 |
| 14 | Los Angeles Rams | 2 | 7 | 0 | .222 | 200 | 250 | W1 |
Tiebreakers

== Regular season stats ==
Passing

Passing
| Player | Pos | G | GS | QBrec | Cmp | Att | Cmp% | Yds | TD | TD% | Int | Int% | Y/A | AY/A | Y/C | Y/G | Lng | Rate | Sk | Yds | NY/A | ANY/A | Sk% | 4QC | GWD |
|---|---|---|---|---|---|---|---|---|---|---|---|---|---|---|---|---|---|---|---|---|---|---|---|---|---|
| Theismann | QB | 9 | 9 | 8–1–0 | 161 | 252 | 63.9 | 2033 | 13 | 5.2 | 9 | 3.6 | 8.1 | 7.5 | 12.6 | 225.9 | 78 | 91.3 | 30 | 223 | 10.6 | 6.42 | 5.90 | 2 | 2 |
| Washington | RB | 7 | 1 | | 1 | 1 | 100.0 | 35 | 0 | 0.0 | 0 | 0.0 | 35.0 | 35.0 | 35.0 | 5.0 | 35 | 118.7 | 0 | 0 | 0.0 | 35.00 | 35.00 | | |
| Team Total | | 9 | | 8–1–0 | 162 | 253 | 64.0 | 2068 | 13 | 5.1 | 9 | 3.6 | 8.2 | 7.6 | 12.8 | 229.8 | 78 | 91.8 | 30 | 223 | 10.6 | 6.52 | 6.01 | 2 | 2 |
| Opp Total | | 9 | | | 146 | 275 | 53.1 | 1870 | 8 | 2.9 | 11 | 4.0 | 6.8 | 5.58 | 12.8 | 207.8 | 62 | 67.7 | 32 | 256 | 10.4 | 5.3 | 4.2 | | |

Rushing

Rushing
| Player | Pos | G | GS | Att | Yds | TD | Lng | Y/A | Y/G | A/G |
|---|---|---|---|---|---|---|---|---|---|---|
| Riggins | RB | 8 | 8 | 177 | 553 | 3 | 19 | 3.1 | 69.1 | 22.1 |
| Washington | RB | 7 | 1 | 44 | 190 | 1 | 40 | 4.3 | 27.1 | 6.3 |
| Harmon | RB | 9 | 0 | 38 | 168 | 1 | 20 | 4.4 | 18.7 | 4.2 |
| Theismann | QB | 9 | 9 | 31 | 150 | 0 | 16 | 4.8 | 16.7 | 3.4 |
| Wonsley | RB | 9 | 0 | 11 | 36 | 0 | 7 | 3.3 | 4.0 | 1.2 |
| Monk | WR | 9 | 9 | 7 | 21 | 0 | 14 | 3.0 | 2.3 | 0.8 |
| Walker | TE | 9 | 7 | 2 | 11 | 0 | 6 | 5.5 | 1.2 | 0.2 |
| Jackson | RB | 1 | 0 | 4 | 6 | 0 | 2 | 1.5 | 6.0 | 4.0 |
| Giaquinto | RB | 7 | 0 | 1 | 5 | 0 | 5 | 5.0 | 0.7 | 0.1 |
| Team Total | | 9 | | 315 | 1140 | 5 | 40 | 3.6 | 126.7 | 35.0 |
| Opp Total | | 9 | | 247 | 946 | 8 | 64 | 3.8 | 105.1 | 27.4 |

Receiving

Receiving
| Player | Pos | G | GS | Rec | Yds | Y/R | TD | Lng | R/G | Y/G | Ctch% |
|---|---|---|---|---|---|---|---|---|---|---|---|
| Monk | WR | 9 | 9 | 35 | 447 | 12.8 | 1 | 43 | 3.9 | 49.7 | 0.0% |
| Brown | WR | 9 | 9 | 32 | 690 | 21.6 | 8 | 78 | 3.6 | 76.7 | 0.0% |
| Warren | TE | 9 | 9 | 27 | 310 | 11.5 | 0 | 29 | 3.0 | 34.4 | 0.0% |
| Washington | RB | 7 | 1 | 19 | 134 | 7.1 | 1 | 17 | 2.7 | 19.1 | 0.0% |
| Walker | TE | 9 | 7 | 12 | 92 | 7.7 | 1 | 25 | 1.3 | 10.2 | 0.0% |
| Harmon | RB | 9 | 0 | 11 | 86 | 7.8 | 0 | 28 | 1.2 | 9.6 | 0.0% |
| Riggins | RB | 8 | 8 | 10 | 50 | 5.0 | 0 | 11 | 1.3 | 6.3 | 0.0% |
| Seay | WR | 8 | 1 | 6 | 154 | 25.7 | 0 | 37 | 0.8 | 19.3 | 0.0% |
| Williams | TE | 6 | 1 | 3 | 14 | 4.7 | 0 | 6 | 0.5 | 2.3 | 0.0% |
| Giaquinto | RB | 7 | 0 | 2 | 65 | 32.5 | 0 | 36 | 0.3 | 9.3 | 0.0% |
| Didier | TE | 8 | 0 | 2 | 10 | 5.0 | 1 | 8 | 0.3 | 1.3 | 0.0% |
| Jackson | RB | 1 | 0 | 1 | 9 | 9.0 | 0 | 9 | 1.0 | 9.0 | 0.0% |
| Garrett | WR | 9 | 0 | 1 | 6 | 6.0 | 0 | 6 | 0.1 | 0.7 | 0.0% |
| Wonsley | RB | 9 | 0 | 1 | 1 | 1.0 | 1 | 1 | 0.1 | 0.1 | 0.0% |
| Team Total | | 9 | | 162 | 2068 | 12.8 | 13 | 78 | 18.0 | 229.8 | |
| Opp Total | | 9 | | 146 | 1614 | 11.1 | 8 | 62 | 16.2 | 179.3 | |

Kicking

Kicking
| | | Games | | 0–19 | | 20–29 | | 30–39 | | 40–49 | | 50+ | | Scoring | | | | | | |
| Player | Pos | G | GS | FGA | FGM | FGA | FGM | FGA | FGM | FGA | FGM | FGA | FGM | FGA | FGM | Lng | FG% | XPA | XPM | XP% |
|---|---|---|---|---|---|---|---|---|---|---|---|---|---|---|---|---|---|---|---|---|
| Moseley | K | 9 | 0 | 1 | 1 | 6 | 6 | 8 | 8 | 6 | 5 | | | 21 | 20 | | 95.2% | 19 | 16 | 84.2% |
| Team Total | | 9 | | 1 | 1 | 6 | 6 | 8 | 8 | 6 | 5 | | | 21 | 20 | | 95.2% | 19 | 16 | 84.2% |
| Opp Total | | 9 | | | | 2 | 1 | 2 | 2 | 4 | 3 | 1 | 0 | 9 | 6 | | 66.7% | 16 | 14 | 87.5% |

Punting

Punting
| Player | Pos | G | GS | Pnt | Yds | Lng | TB | In20 | Blck | Y/P |
|---|---|---|---|---|---|---|---|---|---|---|
| Hayes | P | 9 | 0 | 51 | 1937 | 58 | 5 | 10 | 1 | 38.0 |
| Team Total | | 9 | | 51 | 1937 | 58 | 5 | 10 | 1 | 38.0 |
| Opp Total | | 9 | | 56 | 2247 | 58 | 3 | 5 | 1 | 40.1 |

Kick Return

Kick return
| Player | Pos | G | GS | Rt | Yds | TD | Lng | Y/Rt |
|---|---|---|---|---|---|---|---|---|
| Nelms | DB | 8 | 0 | 23 | 557 | 0 | 58 | 24.2 |
| Garrett | WR | 9 | 0 | 2 | 35 | 0 | 18 | 17.5 |
| Giaquinto | RB | 7 | 0 | 1 | 21 | 0 | 21 | 21.0 |
| Wonsley | RB | 9 | 0 | 1 | 14 | 0 | 14 | 14.0 |
| Harmon | RB | 9 | 0 | 1 | 13 | 0 | 13 | 13.0 |
| Anderson | LB | 2 | 0 | 1 | 7 | 0 | 7 | 7.0 |
| Williams | DB | 9 | 0 | 1 | 2 | 0 | 2 | 2.0 |
| Team Total | | 9 | | 30 | 649 | 0 | 58 | 21.6 |
| Opp Total | | 9 | | 42 | 726 | 0 | 33 | 17.3 |

Punt Return

Punt return
| Player | Pos | G | GS | Rt | Yds | TD | Lng | Y/Rt |
|---|---|---|---|---|---|---|---|---|
| Nelms | DB | 8 | 0 | 32 | 252 | 0 | 28 | 7.9 |
| Giaquinto | RB | 7 | 0 | 5 | 34 | 0 | 12 | 6.8 |
| Williams | DB | 9 | 0 | 1 | 9 | 0 | 9 | 9.0 |
| Team Total | | 9 | | 38 | 295 | 0 | 28 | 7.8 |
| Opp Total | | 9 | | 30 | 106 | 0 | 11 | 3.5 |

Sacks

Sacks
| Player | Pos | G | GS | Sk |
|---|---|---|---|---|
| Manley | RDE | 9 | 9 | 6.5 |
| McGee | DE | 9 | 0 | 6.5 |
| Butz | LDT | 9 | 9 | 4.5 |
| Milot | RLB | 9 | 9 | 3.0 |
| Olkewicz | MLB | 9 | 9 | 3.0 |
| Grant | DT | 9 | 4 | 2.5 |
| Kaufman | LLB | 9 | 7 | 1.5 |
| Brooks | RDT | 5 | 5 | 1.0 |
| Liebenstein | DE | 9 | 0 | 1.0 |
| Mendenhall | LDE | 9 | 9 | 1.0 |
| Murphy | FS | 9 | 9 | 1.0 |
| Kubin | LB | 9 | 0 | 0.5 |
| Team Total | | 9 | | 32 |
| Opp Total | | 9 | | 30 |

Interceptions

Interceptions
| Player | Pos | G | GS | Int | Yds | TD | Lng | PD |
|---|---|---|---|---|---|---|---|---|
| Dean | RCB | 9 | 8 | 3 | 62 | 0 | 26 | |
| White | LCB | 9 | 9 | 3 | 4 | 0 | 4 | |
| Murphy | FS | 9 | 9 | 2 | 0 | 0 | 0 | |
| Peters | SS | 9 | 9 | 1 | 14 | 0 | 14 | |
| McDaniel | DB | 8 | 0 | 1 | 7 | 0 | 7 | |
| Manley | RDE | 9 | 9 | 1 | –2 | 0 | –2 | |
| Team Total | | 9 | | 11 | 85 | 0 | 26 | |
| Opp Total | | 9 | | 9 | 68 | 0 | 15 | |

Fumbles

Fumbles
| Player | Pos | G | GS | FF | Fmb | FR | Yds | TD |
|---|---|---|---|---|---|---|---|---|
| Theismann | QB | 9 | 9 | | 4 | 1 | –21 | 0 |
| Monk | WR | 9 | 9 | | 3 | 0 | 0 | 0 |
| Nelms | DB | 8 | 0 | | 3 | 0 | 0 | 0 |
| Riggins | RB | 8 | 8 | | 2 | 0 | 0 | 0 |
| Washington | RB | 7 | 1 | | 2 | 0 | 0 | 0 |
| Brown | WR | 9 | 9 | | 1 | 1 | 0 | 0 |
| Manley | RDE | 9 | 9 | | 0 | 3 | 3 | 0 |
| Olkewicz | MLB | 9 | 9 | | 0 | 3 | 0 | 0 |
| Brooks | RDT | 5 | 5 | | 0 | 1 | 0 | 0 |
| Butz | LDT | 9 | 9 | | 0 | 1 | 0 | 0 |
| Cronan | LB | 7 | 0 | | 0 | 1 | 0 | 0 |
| Grimm | LG | 9 | 9 | | 0 | 1 | 0 | 0 |
| Jacoby | LT | 9 | 9 | | 0 | 1 | 0 | 0 |
| Kaufman | LLB | 9 | 7 | | 0 | 1 | 0 | 0 |
| Lavender | DB | 7 | 1 | | 0 | 1 | 0 | 0 |
| Peters | SS | 9 | 9 | | 0 | 1 | 0 | 0 |
| Wonsley | RB | 9 | 0 | | 0 | 1 | 0 | 0 |
| Team Total | | 9 | | | 15 | 18 | –18 | 0 |
| Opp Total | | 9 | | | 23 | 10 | | 0 |

Tackles

Tackles
| Player | Pos | G | GS | Comb | Solo | Ast | TFL | QBHits | Sfty |
|---|---|---|---|---|---|---|---|---|---|
| Murphy | FS | 9 | 9 | 100 | 55 | 45 | | | |
| Olkewicz | MLB | 9 | 9 | 88 | 55 | 33 | | | |
| Milot | RLB | 9 | 9 | 73 | 41 | 32 | | | |
| Butz | LDT | 9 | 9 | 55 | 37 | 18 | | | |
| Peters | SS | 9 | 9 | 51 | 28 | 23 | | | |
| Kaufman | LLB | 9 | 7 | 49 | 25 | 24 | | | |
| Manley | RDE | 9 | 9 | 48 | 32 | 16 | | | |
| Dean | RCB | 9 | 8 | 47 | 34 | 13 | | | |
| White | LCB | 9 | 9 | 41 | 22 | 19 | | | |
| Grant | DT | 9 | 4 | 37 | 24 | 13 | | | |
| Mendenhall | LDE | 9 | 9 | 34 | 17 | 17 | | | |
| Coleman | LB | 8 | 2 | 27 | 22 | 5 | | | |
| Brooks | RDT | 5 | 5 | 21 | 17 | 4 | | | |
| Kubin | LB | 9 | 0 | 14 | 9 | 5 | | | |
| Lavender | DB | 7 | 1 | 10 | 10 | 0 | | | |
| McGee | DE | 9 | 0 | 5 | 3 | 2 | | | |
| Jordan | DB | 9 | 0 | 4 | 1 | 3 | | | |
| McDaniel | DB | 8 | 0 | 3 | 3 | 0 | | | |
| Lowry | LB | 9 | 0 | 2 | 0 | 2 | | | |
| Cronan | LB | 7 | 0 | 1 | 1 | 0 | | | |

Scoring Summary

Scoring
| Player | Pos | G | GS | RshTD | RecTD | PR TD | KR TD | FblTD | IntTD | OthTD | AllTD | XPM | XPA | FGM | FGA | Sfty | Pts | Pts/G |
|---|---|---|---|---|---|---|---|---|---|---|---|---|---|---|---|---|---|---|
| Moseley | K | 9 | 0 | | | | | | | | | 16 | 19 | 20 | 21 | | 76 | 8.4 |
| Brown | WR | 9 | 9 | | 8 | | | | | | 8 | | | | | | 48 | 5.3 |
| Riggins | RB | 8 | 8 | 3 | | | | | | | 3 | | | | | | 18 | 2.3 |
| Team Total | | 9 | | 5 | 13 | | | | | 1 | 19 | 16 | 19 | 20 | 21 | | 190 | |
| Opp Total | | 9 | | 8 | 8 | | | | | | 16 | 14 | 16 | 6 | 9 | | 128 | |

Team

Quarter-by-quarter

Quarter-by-quarter
| Team | 1 | 2 | 3 | 4 | OT | T |
|---|---|---|---|---|---|---|
| Redskins | 36 | 67 | 22 | 62 | 3 | 190 |
| Opponents | 17 | 33 | 43 | 35 | 0 | 128 |

== Fun Bunch ==
The Fun Bunch was the nickname for the wide receivers and tight ends of the Washington Redskins of the National Football League during the early 1980s. Known for their choreographed group celebrations in the end zone (usually a group high-five) following a touchdown.

The members of the Fun Bunch included the Redskins' wide receivers Art Monk, Virgil Seay, Charlie Brown, and Alvin Garrett, and tight ends Rick Walker, and Don Warren. Every single one of these players won a Super Bowl with the Redskins, and three have been chosen for the Pro Bowl. The first high-five leap performed by the Fun Bunch occurred after an Alvin Garrett touchdown 1982 first-round Playoff game against the Detroit Lions.

The Fun Bunch celebration was begun as a tribute to Art Monk, who was injured late in the 1982 regular season and could not participate in the playoffs that year. Garrett forgot about the arranged celebration after his first two touchdown grabs against the Lions. Thankfully, he nabbed a third TD, and the Fun Bunch was born.

The celebration continued into the following year, with Monk joining in. Some Redskins opponents, however, had begun to get annoyed with the display. In a week 15 game against the rival Dallas Cowboys, things came to a head. The game would decide both which team would win the NFC East division, and which of the two teams would have home field advantage throughout the playoffs. In the second half, with the Redskins leading 14–10, Darrell Green intercepted a Danny White pass on a carom. On the very next play, quarterback Joe Theismann hit Art Monk for a 43-yard touchdown pass and catch to break the game open. After the score, the Redskins' receivers gathered in the end zone to celebrate, but were joined by members of the Cowboys secondary. There was some pushing and shoving between the players, and the Fun Bunch went ahead and jumped, albeit with very little high-fiving possible. Both teams were assessed a penalty for unsportsman-like behavior, which offset each other, and the game continued.

The Fun Bunch celebrations were discontinued the following year. NFL rule changes regarding excessive celebrations made such pre-planned group activities a penalty, although this rule was subsequently scaled back. The Fun Bunch remains an iconic symbol of the success the Redskins had in 1982 and 1983.

== Playoffs ==
| Round | Date | Opponent (seed) | Result | Record | Venue | Attendance | NFL.com recap |
|---|---|---|---|---|---|---|---|
| NFC First Round | January 8 | Detroit Lions (8) | W 31–7 | 1–0 | RFK Stadium | 55,045 | Recap |
| NFC Second Round | January 15 | Minnesota Vikings (4) | W 21–7 | 2–0 | RFK Stadium | 54,593 | Recap |
| NFC Championship | January 22 | Dallas Cowboys (2) | W 31–17 | 3–0 | RFK Stadium | 55,045 | Recap |
| Super Bowl XVII | January 30 | Miami Dolphins (A2) | W 27–17 | 4–0 | Rose Bowl | 103,667 | Recap |

Notes:

^{a} All times are EASTERN time.

== Playoff game summaries ==
=== 1982 NFC First Round: (Saturday, January 8, 1983): vs. Detroit Lions ===
1982 NFC First Round: Detroit Lions at Washington Redskins – Game summary

| Quarter | 1 | 2 | 3 | 4 | Total |
|---|---|---|---|---|---|
| Lions (0–1) | 0 | 0 | 7 | 0 | 7 |
| Redskins (1–0) | 10 | 14 | 7 | 0 | 31 |

at RFK Stadium • Washington, D.C.

- Date: January 8, 1983
- Game time: 12:30 p.m. EST
- Game weather: 46 °F (7.8 °C) (cloudy)
- Game attendance: 55,045
- Referee: Tom Dooley
- TV announcers (CBS): Dick Stockton (play-by-play) and Roger Staubach (color commentator)

| Team | Category | Player | Statistics |
|---|---|---|---|
| DET | Passing | Eric Hipple | 22/38, 298 YDS, 1 TD, 2 INTs |
| DET | Rushing | Eric Hipple | 6 CAR, 47 YDS |
| DET | Receiving | Leonard Thompson | 7 REC, 150 YDS |
| WSH | Passing | Joe Theismann | 14/19, 210 YDS, 3 TDs |
| WSH | Rushing | John Riggins | 25 CAR, 119 YDS |
| WSH | Receiving | Alvin Garrett | 6 REC, 110 YDS, 3 TDs |

Scoring summary

| Quarter | Time | Drive | | | Team | Scoring information | Score | |
| Quarter | Time | Plays | Yards | TOP | Team | Scoring information | DET | WSH |
|---|---|---|---|---|---|---|---|---|
| 1 | 6:59 | — | — | — | Redskins | Interception returned 77 yards for touchdown by White, Moseley kick good | 0 | 7 |
| 1 | 2:27 | | | | Redskins | 26-yard field goal by Moseley | 0 | 10 |
| 2 | 11:42 | | | | Redskins | Garrett 21-yard touchdown reception from Theismann, Moseley kick good | 0 | 17 |
| 2 | 1:49 | | | | Redskins | Garrett 21-yard touchdown reception from Theismann, Moseley kick good | 0 | 24 |
| 3 | 12:22 | | | | Redskins | Garrett 27-yard touchdown reception from Theismann, Moseley kick good | 0 | 31 |
| 3 | 8:07 | | | | Lions | Hill 15-yard touchdown reception from Hipple, Murray kick good | 7 | 31 |
| "TOP" = time of possession. For other American football terms, see Glossary of American football. | | | | | | | 7 | 31 |

- Point spread:
- Over/under:
- Time of game:

| Lions | Game statistics | Redskins |
|---|---|---|
| 20 | First downs | 18 |
| 21–95 | Rushes–yards | 38–175 |
| 298 | Passing yards | 210 |
| 22–38–2 | Passes | 14–19–0 |
| 4–29 | Sacked–yards | 2–19 |
| 269 | Net passing yards | 191 |
| 364 | Total yards | 366 |
| 136 | Return yards | 174 |
| 3–38.3 | Punts | 4–31.2 |
| 3–3 | Fumbles–lost | 0–0 |
| 5–29 | Penalties–yards | 4–20 |
| 27:22 | Time of possession | 32:38 |

Individual stats

- Passing: Theismann – 14/19, 210 YDS, 3 TDs
- Rushing: Riggins – 25 CAR, 119 YDS; Jackson – 8 CAR, 27 YDS; Walker – 2 CAR, 14 YDS; Washington – 1 CAR, 9 YDS; Theismann – 2 CAR, 6 YDS
- Receiving: Garrett – 6 REC, 110 YDS, 3 TDs; Walker – 4 REC, 16 YDS; Brown – 3 REC, 69 YDS; Washington – 1 REC, 15 YDS
- Kicking: Moseley – 4/4 PAT, 1/2 FG
- Punting: Hayes – 4 PUNTS, 125 YDS
- Kickoff Return: Nelms – 2 KR, 37 YDS
- Punt Return: Nelms – 3 PR, 60 YDS
- Sacks: Coleman – 1.0; Dean – 1.0; Manley – 1.0; Murphy – 1.0
- Interceptions: White – 2 INTs, 77 YDS, 1 TD
- Redskins Missed Field Goals: Moseley 42

=== 1982 NFC Second Round (Saturday, January 15, 1983): vs. Minnesota Vikings ===
1982 NFC Second Round: Minnesota Vikings at Washington Redskins – Game summary

| Quarter | 1 | 2 | 3 | 4 | Total |
|---|---|---|---|---|---|
| Vikings (1–1) | 0 | 7 | 0 | 0 | 7 |
| Redskins (2–0) | 14 | 7 | 0 | 0 | 21 |

at RFK Stadium • Washington, D.C.

- Date: January 15, 1983
- Game time: 12:30 p.m. EST
- Game weather: 44 °F (6.7 °C) (cloudy, breezy)
- Game attendance: 55,045
- Referee: Jim Tunney
- TV announcers (CBS): Jack Buck (play-by-play), Hank Stram (color commentator) and Irv Cross (reporter)

| Team | Category | Player | Statistics |
|---|---|---|---|
| MIN | Passing | Tommy Kramer | 18/39, 252 YDS |
| MIN | Rushing | Ted Brown | 14 CAR, 65 YDS |
| MIN | Receiving | Ted Brown | 7 REC, 62 YDS |
| WSH | Passing | Joe Theismann | 17/23, 213 YDS, 2 TDs, 1 INT |
| WSH | Rushing | John Riggins | 37 CAR, 185 YDS, 1 TD |
| WSH | Receiving | Charlie Brown | 5 REC, 59 YDS |

Scoring summary

| Quarter | Time | Drive | | | Team | Scoring information | Score | |
| Quarter | Time | Plays | Yards | TOP | Team | Scoring information | MIN | WSH |
|---|---|---|---|---|---|---|---|---|
| 1 | 9:03 | | | | Redskins | Warren 3-yard touchdown reception from Theismann, Moseley kick good | 0 | 7 |
| 1 | 1:00 | 7 | 71 | | Redskins | Riggins 2-yard touchdown run, Moseley kick good | 0 | 14 |
| 2 | 13:03 | | | | Vikings | Brown 18-yard touchdown run, Danmeier kick good | 7 | 14 |
| 2 | 9:58 | | | | Redskins | Garrett 18-yard touchdown reception from Theismann, Moseley kick good | 7 | 21 |
| "TOP" = time of possession. For other American football terms, see Glossary of American football. | | | | | | | 7 | 21 |

- Point spread:
- Over/under:
- Time of game:

| Vikings | Game statistics | Redskins |
|---|---|---|
| 15 | First downs | 23 |
| 18–79 | Rushes–yards | 42–204 |
| 252 | Passing yards | 213 |
| 18–39–0 | Passes | 17–23–1 |
| 2–14 | Sacked–yards | 2–2 |
| 238 | Net passing yards | 211 |
| 317 | Total yards | 415 |
| 45 | Return yards | 49 |
| 4–39.2 | Punts | 2–30.0 |
| 1–0 | Fumbles–lost | 0–0 |
| 5–39 | Penalties–yards | 3–25 |
| 25:09 | Time of possession | 34:51 |

Individual stats

- Passing: Theismann – 17/23, 213 YDS, 2 TDs, 1 INT
- Rushing: Riggins – 37 CAR, 185 YDS, 1 TD; Washington – 1 CAR, 11 YDS; Garrett – 1 CAR, 4 YDS; Theismann – 3 CAR, 4 YDS
- Receiving: Brown – 5 REC, 59 YDS; Warren – 4 REC, 20 YDS, 1 TD; Garrett – 3 REC, 75 YDS, 1 TD; Giaquinto – 2 REC, 39 YDS; Walker – 2 REC, 15 YDS; Washington – 1 REC, 5 YDS
- Kicking: Moseley – 3/3 PAT, 0/2 FG
- Punting: Hayes – 2 PUNTS, 60 YDS
- Kickoff Return: Nelms – 1 KR, 22 YDS; Jackson – 1 KR, 18 YDS
- Punt Return: Nelms – 1 PR, 9 YDS
- Sacks: Manley – 1.0; McGee – 1.0
- Redskins Missed Field Goals: Moseley 47, 39

Running back John Riggins led the Redskins to a victory with 185 rushing yards and a touchdown.

=== 1982 NFC Championship Game (Saturday, January 22, 1983): vs. Dallas Cowboys ===
1982 NFC Championship Game: Dallas Cowboys at Washington Redskins – Game summary

| Quarter | 1 | 2 | 3 | 4 | Total |
|---|---|---|---|---|---|
| Cowboys (2–1) | 3 | 0 | 14 | 0 | 17 |
| Redskins (3–0) | 7 | 7 | 7 | 10 | 31 |

at RFK Stadium • Washington, D.C.

- Date: January 22, 1983
- Game time: 12:30 p.m. EST
- Game weather: 38 °F (3.3 °C) (Overcast)
- Game attendance: 55,045
- Referee: Jerry Seeman
- TV announcers (CBS): Pat Summerall (play-by-play), John Madden (color commentator) and Irv Cross (reporter)

| Team | Category | Player | Statistics |
|---|---|---|---|
| DAL | Passing | Gary Hogeboom | 14/29, 162 YDS, 2 TDs, 2 INTs |
| DAL | Rushing | Tony Dorsett | 15 CAR, 57 YDS |
| DAL | Receiving | Butch Johnson | 5 REC, 73 TDS, 1 TD |
| WSH | Passing | Joe Theismann | 12/20, 150 YDS, 1 TD |
| WSH | Rushing | John Riggins | 36 CAR, 140 YDS, 2 TDs |
| WSH | Receiving | Alvin Garrett | 4 REC, 46 YDS |

Scoring summary

| Quarter | Time | Drive | | | Team | Scoring information | Score | |
| Quarter | Time | Plays | Yards | TOP | Team | Scoring information | DAL | WSH |
|---|---|---|---|---|---|---|---|---|
| 1 | 7:15 | 14 | 75 | | Cowboys | 27-yard field goal by Septién | 3 | 0 |
| 1 | 1:55 | 9 | 84 | | Redskins | Brown 19-yard touchdown reception from Theismann, Moseley kick good | 3 | 7 |
| 2 | | 4 | 11 | | Redskins | Riggins 1-yard touchdown run, Moseley kick good | 3 | 14 |
| 3 | 11:29 | 6 | 38 | | Cowboys | Pearson 6-yard touchdown reception from Hogeboom, Septién kick good | 10 | 14 |
| 3 | 9:11 | 5 | 20 | | Redskins | Riggins 4-yard touchdown run, Moseley kick good | 10 | 21 |
| 3 | 3:25 | 14 | 84 | | Cowboys | Johnson 23-yard touchdown reception from Hogeboom, Septién kick good | 17 | 21 |
| 4 | 7:12 | 7 | | | Redskins | 29-yard field goal by Moseley | 17 | 24 |
| 4 | 6:55 | – | – | – | Redskins | Interception returned 10 yards for touchdown by Grant, Moseley kick good | 17 | 31 |
| "TOP" = time of possession. For other American football terms, see Glossary of American football. | | | | | | | 17 | 31 |

- Point spread:
- Over/under:
- Time of game:

| Cowboys | Game statistics | Redskins |
|---|---|---|
| 21 | First downs | 18 |
| 21–65 | Rushes–yards | 40–137 |
| 275 | Passing yards | 150 |
| 23–44–2 | Passes | 12–20–0 |
| 0–0 | Sacked–yards | 3–27 |
| 275 | Net passing yards | 123 |
| 340 | Total yards | 260 |
| 104 | Return yards | 154 |
| 3–31.0 | Punts | 5–40.2 |
| 2–1 | Fumbles–lost | 1–0 |
| 3–15 | Penalties–yards | 3–25 |
| 27:22 | Time of possession | 32:38 |

Individual stats

- Passing: Theismann – 12/20, 150 YDS, 1 TD
- Rushing: Riggins – 36 CAR, 140 YDS, 2 TDs; Washington – 2 CAR, 2 YDS; Garrett – 1 CAR, –2 YDS; Theismann – 1 CAR, –3 YDS
- Receiving: Garrett – 4 REC, 46 YDS; Brown – 3 REC, 58 YDS, 1 TD; Warren – 2 REC, 24 YDS; Washington – 1 REC, 13 YDS; Walker – 1 REC, 9 YDS; Harmon – 1 REC, 4 YDS
- Kicking: Moseley – 4/4 PAT, 1/2 FG
- Punting: Hayes – 5 PUNTS, 201 YDS
- Kickoff Return: Nelms – 4 KR, 128 YDS
- Punt Return: Nelms – 2 PR, 14 YDS
- Interceptions: Grant – 1 INT, 10 YDS, 1 TD; Kaufman – 1 INT, 2 YDS
- Redskins Missed Field Goals: Moseley 27

John Riggins, who ran nine straight times to help Washington run out the clock in the final period, finished the game with 140 rushing yards and 2 touchdowns.

=== Super Bowl XVII (Sunday, January 30, 1983): vs. Miami Dolphins ===
Super Bowl XVII: Miami Dolphins vs. Washington Redskins – Game summary

| Quarter | 1 | 2 | 3 | 4 | Total |
|---|---|---|---|---|---|
| Dolphins (3–1) | 7 | 10 | 0 | 0 | 17 |
| Redskins (4–0) | 0 | 10 | 3 | 14 | 27 |

at Rose Bowl • Pasadena, California

- Date: January 30, 1983
- Game time: 6:17 p.m. EST
- Game weather: 54 °F (12.2 °C), wind 9 mph (14 km/h)
- Game attendance: 103,667
- Referee: Jerry Markbreit
- TV announcers (NBC): Dick Enberg (play-by-play), Merlin Olsen (color commentator) and Mike Adamle and Bill Macatee (reporters)

| Team | Category | Player | Statistics |
|---|---|---|---|
| MIA | Passing | David Woodley | 4/14, 97 YDS, 1 TD, 1 INT |
| MIA | Rushing | Andra Franklin | 16 CAR, 49 YDS |
| MIA | Receiving | Jimmy Cefalo | 2 REC, 82 YDS |
| WSH | Passing | Joe Theismann | 15/23, 143 YDS, 2 TDs, 2 INTs |
| WSH | Rushing | John Riggins | 38 CAR, 166 YDS, 1 TD |
| WSH | Receiving | Charlie Brown | 6 REC, 60 YDS, 1 TD |

Scoring summary

| Quarter | Time | Drive | | | Team | Scoring information | Score | |
| Quarter | Time | Plays | Yards | TOP | Team | Scoring information | MIA | WSH |
|---|---|---|---|---|---|---|---|---|
| 1 | 8:11 | | | | Dolphins | Cefalo 76-yard touchdown reception from Woodley, von Schumann kick good | 7 | 0 |
| 2 | 14:19 | | | | Redskins | 31-yard field goal by Moseley | 7 | 3 |
| 2 | 6:00 | | | | Dolphins | 20-yard field goal by von Schumann | 10 | 3 |
| 2 | 1:51 | | | | Redskins | Garrett 4-yard touchdown reception from Theismann, Moseley kick good | 10 | 10 |
| 2 | 1:38 | | | | Dolphins | Kickoff returned 98 yards for touchdown by Walker, von Schamann kick good | 17 | 10 |
| 3 | 8:09 | | | | Redskins | 20-yard field goal by Moseley | 17 | 13 |
| 4 | 10:01 | | | | Redskins | Riggins 43-yard touchdown run, Moseley kick good | 17 | 20 |
| 4 | 1:55 | | | | Redskins | Brown 6-yard touchdown reception from Theismann, Moseley kick good | 17 | 27 |
| "TOP" = time of possession. For other American football terms, see Glossary of American football. | | | | | | | 17 | 27 |

- Point spread:
- Over/under:
- Time of game: 3 hours, 13 minutes

| Dolphins | Game statistics | Redskins |
|---|---|---|
| 9 | First downs | 24 |
| 29–96 | Rushes–yards | 52–276 |
| 97 | Passing yards | 143 |
| 4–17–1 | Passes | 15–23–2 |
| 1–17 | Sacked–yards | 3–19 |
| 80 | Net passing yards | 124 |
| 176 | Total yards | 400 |
| 244 | Return yards | 109 |
| 6–37.8 | Punts | 4–42.0 |
| 2–1 | Fumbles–lost | 0–0 |
| 4–55 | Penalties–yards | 5–36 |
| 23:45 | Time of possession | 36:15 |

Individual stats

- Passing: Theismann – 15/23, 143 YDS, 2 TDs, 2 INTs
- Rushing: Riggins – 38 CAR, 166 YDS, 1 TD; Garrett – 1 CAR, 44 YDS; Clarence Harmon – 9 CAR, 40 YDS; Theismann – 3 CAR, 20 YDS; Walker – 1 CAR, 6 YDS
- Receiving: Brown – 6 REC, 60 YDS, 1 TD; Warren – 5 REC, 28 YDS; Garrett – 2 REC, 13 YDS, 1 TD; Walker – 1 REC, 27 YDS; Riggins – 1 REC, 15 YDS
- Kicking: Moseley – 3/3 PAT, 2/2 FG
- Punting: Hayes – 4 PUNTS, 168 YDS
- Kickoff Return: Nelms – 2 KR, 44 YDS; Wonsley – 1 KR, 13 YDS
- Punt Return: Nelms – 6 PR, 52 YDS
- Sacks: Manley – 1.0
- Interceptions: Murphy – 1 INT, 0 YDS

== Playoff Stats ==
Passing

Passing
| Player | Pos | G | GS | QBrec | Cmp | Att | Cmp% | Yds | TD | TD% | Int | Int% | Y/A | AY/A | Y/C | Y/G | Lng | Rate | Sk | Yds | NY/A | ANY/A | Sk% | 4QC | GWD |
|---|---|---|---|---|---|---|---|---|---|---|---|---|---|---|---|---|---|---|---|---|---|---|---|---|---|
| Theismann | QB | 4 | 4 | 4–0–0 | 58 | 85 | 68.2 | 716 | 8 | 9.4 | 3 | 3.5 | | | | 179.0 | 46 | 110.7 | 10 | 67 | | | | | |
| Team Total | | 4 | | 4–0–0 | 58 | 85 | 68.2 | 716 | 8 | 9.4 | 3 | 3.5 | | | | 179.0 | 46 | 110.7 | 10 | 67 | | | | | |
| Opp Total | | 4 | | | 77 | 136 | 55.8 | 922 | 4 | 2.9 | 5 | 3.6 | | | | 230.5 | 76 | 71.0 | 7 | 60 | | | | | |

Rushing

Rushing
| Player | Pos | G | GS | Att | Yds | TD | Lng | Y/A | Y/G | A/G |
|---|---|---|---|---|---|---|---|---|---|---|
| Riggins | RB | 4 | 4 | 136 | 610 | 4 | 43 | 4.5 | 152.5 | |
| Garrett | WR | 4 | 4 | 3 | 46 | 0 | 44 | 15.3 | 11.5 | |
| Harmon | RB | 4 | 0 | 9 | 40 | 0 | 12 | 4.4 | 10.0 | |
| Jackson | RB | 4 | 0 | 8 | 27 | 0 | 7 | 3.4 | 6.7 | |
| Theismann | QB | 4 | 4 | 9 | 27 | 0 | 12 | 3.0 | 6.7 | |
| Washington | RB | 4 | 0 | 4 | 22 | 0 | 11 | 5.5 | 2.7 | |
| Walker | TE | 4 | 4 | 3 | 20 | 0 | 9 | 6.7 | 2.5 | |
| Team Total | | 4 | | 172 | 792 | 4 | 43 | 4.6 | 198.0 | |
| Opp Total | | 4 | | 89 | 335 | 1 | 18 | 3.8 | 83.7 | |

Receiving

Receiving
| Player | Pos | G | GS | Rec | Yds | Y/R | TD | Lng | R/G | Y/G | Ctch% |
|---|---|---|---|---|---|---|---|---|---|---|---|
| Brown | WR | 4 | 4 | 17 | 242 | 14.2 | 2 | 45 | 4.2 | 60.5 | 0.0% |
| Garrett | WR | 4 | 4 | 15 | 244 | 16.3 | 5 | 46 | 3.7 | 61.0 | 0.0% |
| Warren | TE | 4 | 4 | 11 | 72 | 6.5 | 1 | 15 | 2.7 | 18.0 | 0.0% |
| Walker | TE | 4 | 4 | 8 | 67 | 8.4 | 0 | 27 | 2.0 | 16.7 | 0.0% |
| Washington | RB | 4 | 0 | 3 | 33 | 11.0 | 0 | 15 | 0.7 | 8.2 | 0.0% |
| Giaquinto | RB | 4 | 0 | 2 | 39 | 19.5 | 0 | 29 | 2.0 | 9.7 | 0.0% |
| Riggins | RB | 4 | 4 | 1 | 15 | 15.0 | 0 | 15 | 0.2 | 3.7 | 0.0% |
| Harmon | RB | 4 | 0 | 1 | 4 | 4.0 | 0 | 4 | 0.2 | 1.0 | 0.0% |
| Team Total | | 4 | | 58 | 716 | | 8 | 46 | 14.5 | 179.0 | |
| Opp Total | | 4 | | 77 | 922 | | 4 | 76 | 19.2 | 230.5 | |

Kicking

Kicking
| | | Games | | 0–19 | | 20–29 | | 30–39 | | 40–49 | | 50+ | | Scoring | | | | | | |
| Player | Pos | G | GS | FGA | FGM | FGA | FGM | FGA | FGM | FGA | FGM | FGA | FGM | FGA | FGM | Lng | FG% | XPA | XPM | XP% |
|---|---|---|---|---|---|---|---|---|---|---|---|---|---|---|---|---|---|---|---|---|
| Moseley | K | 4 | 0 | | | 4 | 3 | 2 | 1 | 2 | 0 | | | 8 | 4 | | 50.0% | 14 | 14 | 100.0% |
| Team Total | | 4 | | | | 4 | 3 | 2 | 1 | 2 | 0 | | | 8 | 4 | | 50.0% | 14 | 14 | 100.0% |
| Opp Total | | 4 | | | | 2 | 2 | 1 | 0 | 1 | 0 | | | 4 | 2 | | 50.0% | 6 | 6 | 100.0% |

Punting

Punting
| Player | Pos | G | GS | Pnt | Yds | Lng | TB | In20 | Blck | Y/P |
|---|---|---|---|---|---|---|---|---|---|---|
| Hayes | P | 4 | 0 | 15 | 554 | 54 | 2 | 2 | | 36.9 |
| Team Total | | 4 | | 15 | 554 | 54 | 2 | 2 | | 36.9 |
| Opp Total | | 4 | | 16 | 592 | 61 | | | | 37.0 |

Kick Return

Kick return
| Player | Pos | G | GS | Rt | Yds | TD | Lng | Y/Rt |
|---|---|---|---|---|---|---|---|---|
| Nelms | DB | 4 | 0 | 9 | 231 | 0 | 76 | 25.7 |
| Jackson | RB | 4 | 0 | 1 | 18 | 0 | 18 | 18.0 |
| Wonsley | RB | 4 | 0 | 1 | 13 | 0 | 13 | 13.0 |
| Team Total | | 4 | | 11 | 262 | 0 | 76 | 23.8 |
| Opp Total | | 4 | | 20 | 484 | 1 | 98 | 24.2 |

Punt Return

Punt return
| Player | Pos | G | GS | Rt | Yds | TD | Lng | Y/Rt |
|---|---|---|---|---|---|---|---|---|
| Nelms | DB | 4 | 0 | 12 | 135 | 0 | 39 | 11.3 |
| Team Total | | 4 | | 12 | 135 | 0 | 39 | 11.3 |
| Opp Total | | 4 | | 7 | 45 | 0 | 12 | 6.4 |

Sacks

Sacks
| Player | Pos | G | GS | Sk |
|---|---|---|---|---|
| Manley | RDE | 4 | 4 | 3.0 |
| Coleman | LB | 4 | 0 | 1.0 |
| Dean | RCB | 4 | 4 | 1.0 |
| McGee | DE | 4 | 0 | 1.0 |
| Murphy | FS | 4 | 4 | 1.0 |
| Team Total | | 4 | | 7 |
| Opp Total | | 4 | | 10 |

Interceptions

Interceptions
| Player | Pos | G | GS | Int | Yds | TD | Lng | PD |
|---|---|---|---|---|---|---|---|---|
| White | LCB | 4 | 4 | 2 | 77 | 1 | 77 | |
| Murphy | FS | 4 | 4 | 1 | 0 | 0 | 0 | |
| Grant | RDT | 4 | 4 | 1 | 10 | 1 | 10 | |
| Kaufman | LLB | 4 | 4 | 1 | 2 | 0 | 2 | |
| Team Total | | 4 | | 5 | 89 | 77 | 2 | |
| Opp Total | | 4 | | 3 | 0 | 0 | 0 | |

Fumbles

Fumbles
| Player | Pos | G | GS | FF | Fmb | FR | Yds | TD |
|---|---|---|---|---|---|---|---|---|
| Nelms | DB | 4 | 0 | | 1 | 0 | 0 | 0 |
| Butz | LDT | 4 | 4 | | 0 | 1 | 0 | 0 |
| Coleman | LB | 4 | 0 | | 0 | 1 | 0 | 0 |
| Giaquinto | RB | 4 | 0 | | 0 | 1 | 0 | 0 |
| Grant | RDT | 4 | 4 | | 0 | 1 | 0 | 0 |
| Manley | RDE | 4 | 4 | | 0 | 1 | 0 | 0 |
| Milot | RLB | 4 | 4 | | 0 | 1 | 0 | 0 |
| Team Total | | 4 | | | 1 | 6 | 0 | 0 |
| Opp Total | | 4 | | | 8 | 3 | –15 | 0 |

Tackles

Tackles
| Player | Pos | G | GS | Comb | Solo | Ast | TFL | QBHits | Sfty |
|---|---|---|---|---|---|---|---|---|---|
| Murphy | FS | 4 | 4 | 38 | 24 | 14 | | | |
| Olkewicz | MLB | 4 | 4 | 27 | 18 | 9 | | | |
| Dean | RCB | 4 | 4 | 24 | 19 | 5 | | | |
| White | LCB | 4 | 4 | 20 | 17 | 3 | | | |
| Butz | LDT | 4 | 4 | 19 | 15 | 4 | | | |
| Kaufman | LLB | 4 | 4 | 17 | 8 | 9 | | | |
| Milot | RLB | 4 | 4 | 17 | 11 | 6 | | | |
| Peters | SS | 4 | 4 | 16 | 12 | 4 | | | |
| Manley | RDE | 4 | 4 | 14 | 13 | 1 | | | |
| Grant | RDT | 4 | 4 | 11 | 8 | 3 | | | |
| Coleman | LB | 4 | 0 | 8 | 7 | 1 | | | |
| Mendenhall | LDE | 4 | 4 | 7 | 4 | 3 | | | |
| McGee | DE | 4 | 0 | 4 | 3 | 1 | | | |
| Jordan | DB | 4 | 0 | 4 | 2 | 2 | | | |
| Ogrin | DT | 4 | 0 | 2 | 1 | 1 | | | |
| Liebenstein | DE | 4 | 0 | 1 | 1 | 0 | | | |
| Lavender | DB | 4 | 0 | 1 | 1 | 0 | | | |
| Kubin | LB | 4 | 0 | 1 | 0 | 1 | | | |

Scoring Summary

Scoring
| Player | Pos | G | GS | RshTD | RecTD | PR TD | KR TD | FblTD | IntTD | OthTD | AllTD | XPM | XPA | FGM | FGA | Sfty | Pts | Pts/G |
|---|---|---|---|---|---|---|---|---|---|---|---|---|---|---|---|---|---|---|
| Garrett | WR | 4 | 4 | | 5 | | | | | | 5 | | | | | | 30 | 7.5 |
| Moseley | K | 4 | 0 | | | | | | | | | 14 | 14 | 4 | 8 | | 26 | 6.5 |
| Riggins | RB | 4 | 4 | 4 | | | | | | | 4 | | | | | | 24 | 6.0 |
| Brown | WR | 4 | 4 | | 2 | | | | | | 2 | | | | | | 12 | 3.0 |
| Grant | RDT | 4 | 4 | | | | | | 1 | | 1 | | | | | | 6 | 1.5 |
| Warren | TE | 4 | 4 | | 1 | | | | | | 1 | | | | | | 6 | 1.5 |
| White | LCB | 4 | 4 | | | | | | 1 | | 1 | | | | | | 6 | 1.5 |
| Team Total | | 4 | | 4 | 8 | | | | 2 | | 14 | 14 | 14 | 4 | 8 | | 110 | 27.5 |
| Opp Total | | 4 | | 1 | 4 | | 1 | | | | 6 | 6 | 6 | 2 | 4 | | 48 | 12.0 |

Team

Quarter-by-quarter

Quarter-by-quarter
| Team | 1 | 2 | 3 | 4 | OT |
|---|---|---|---|---|---|
| Redskins | 31 | 38 | 17 | 24 | 110 |
| Opponents | 10 | 17 | 21 | 0 | 48 |

== Awards and records ==
- Joe Gibbs, National Football League Coach of the Year Award
- Mark Moseley, National Football League Most Valuable Player Award,
- John Riggins, Super Bowl Most Valuable Player
- Joe Theismann, Bert Bell Award
- Joe Theismann, NFC Leader, Passer Rating (91.3)
- Jim Speros, recognized as youngest full-time assistant coach in NFL history.

== 1983 AFC-NFC Pro Bowl ==
- Charlie Brown, Wide receiver
- Mark Moseley, Kicker
- Mike Nelms, Kick returner
- Tony Peters, Strong safety, starter
- Joe Theismann, Quarterback, starter

== Media ==
=== Pre season Local TV ===
| Channel | Play-by-play | Color commentator |
| WJLA-TV | Tim Brant | Irv Cross |

=== Local Radio ===
| Flagship station | Play-by-play | Color Commentators |
| WMAL-AM | Frank Herzog | Sam Huff and Sonny Jurgensen |
