= Mel Kaufman =

American football player and coach (1958–2009)

No. 55
- Position: Linebacker

Personal information
- Born: February 24, 1958; Los Angeles, California, U.S.
- Died: February 7, 2009 (aged 50); San Luis Obispo, California, U.S.
- Listed height: 6 ft 2 in (1.88 m)
- Listed weight: 221 lb (100 kg)

Career information
- High school: Santa Monica (Santa Monica, California)
- College: Cal Poly
- NFL draft: 1981: undrafted

Career history

Playing
- Washington Redskins (1981–1988)

Coaching
- Washington Redskins (1989–1998) Scouting advisor; Cal Poly (2007–2008) Linebackers coach

Awards and highlights
- 2× Super Bowl champion (XVII, XXII); NCAA Division II national champion (1980); Cal Poly Athletics Hall of Fame (1993)

Career NFL statistics
- Sacks: 19
- Interceptions: 7
- Touchdowns: 2
- Stats at Pro Football Reference

Melvin Kaufman (February 24, 1958 – February 7, 2009) was an American professional football player who spent his entire eight-year career as a linebacker for the Washington Redskins of the National Football League (NFL). He played college football for the Cal Poly Mustangs.

== Early life ==
Kaufman was born in Los Angeles, California and attended Santa Monica High School in Santa Monica, California, where he earned two varsity letters while playing high school football.

== College career ==
Kaufman played four seasons of college football at Cal Poly after being redshirted in 1976. In 1978, he recovered a blocked punt against Portland State.

During Cal Poly's 1980 national championship season, Kaufman returned an interception 79 yards for a touchdown against Cal State Northridge.

Kaufman earned his bachelor's degree in social science and industrial relations at Cal Poly in 1984.

Starting ahead of the 2010 season, Cal Poly created the Mel Kaufman Award, presented annually to the team's player who most exemplified Kaufman's virtues.

Collegiate Statistics
	Tackles	INT	LG Ret.	TD
Career	146	4	79t	1

== Professional career ==
Kaufman was signed as an undrafted free agent by the Washington Redskins in 1981, along with former Cal Poly teammate LeCharls McDaniel, by Redskins general manager Bobby Beathard. A defensive team leader and team captain with the Redskins from 1981–88, Kaufman was a starting linebacker on three NFC championship teams (1982, 1983 and 1987). He played in three Super Bowls with the Redskins, winning Super Bowl XVII and XXII, and losing Super Bowl XVIII. Kaufman also was a scout for the Redskins in Super Bowl XXVI.

Kaufman announced his retirement from football on July 5, 1989. He started 78 of 91 career NFL games, recording 18.5 sacks, seven interceptions, 586 total tackles and five fumble recoveries.

== Coaching career ==
After his playing career, Kaufman was a scouting supervisor for the Redskins from 1989 through 1998. He then became a mental health counselor and football, basketball and baseball coach at Masada High School in Gardena, California from 2000–05 and a football official (youth and high school games) in the Pacific Coast Conference in 2006 and 2007.

Kaufman had been out of football at the college and professional levels for about 10 years before he was hired as linebackers coach at Cal Poly in Spring 2008. He helped guide the Mustangs to an 8-3 record, a Great West Conference title and a berth in the 2008 NCAA Division I Football Championship playoffs.

== Personal life ==
Kaufman served as an assistant manager at Blue Sky's, a moving and storage company in Los Angeles, in 1998 and 1999. As a volunteer, he was director of the minority internship program and a training camp director for the Redskins, worked with Big Brothers Big Sisters of Washington, D.C., served on the board of directors for the Northern Virginia chapter of the American Lung Association as well as the board of advisors for Virginia Commerce Bank. Kaufman was also a spokesperson for the Federal Bureau of Investigation, Drug Enforcement Administration and the United States military, working with and speaking to children and adults.

== Death ==
Kaufman died in his Santa Margarita home about three weeks shy of his 51st birthday. An autopsy performed by the San Luis Obispo County Sheriff's Office revealed the cause of death as an intra-abdominal hemorrhage due to hemorrhagic pancreatitis.
