= Cris Crissy =

American football player (born 1959)

No. 28
- Position: Cornerback

Personal information
- Born: February 3, 1959 (age 67); Penn Yan, New York, U.S.
- Listed height: 5 ft 11 in (1.80 m)
- Listed weight: 195 lb (88 kg)

Career information
- College: Princeton
- NFL draft: 1981: 12th round, 323 (By the New England Patriots)th overall pick

Career history
- New England Patriots (1981)*; Washington Redskins (1981)
- * Offseason or practice squad member only

Awards and highlights
- Super Bowl champion (XVII); Second-team All-East (1980)

Career NFL statistics
- Games played: 1
- Stats at Pro Football Reference

William Robert Crissy, Jr. (born February 3, 1959) is an American former professional football player who was a cornerback for the Washington Redskins of the National Football League (NFL). He played college football for the Princeton Tigers and was selected by the New England Patriots in the 12th round of the 1981 NFL draft.

Crissy played football for Penn Yan Academy, the public high school in the small town of Penn Yan (population 5,500) in the Finger Lakes Region of New York State where he grew up. In his senior year (1976), he was named a first-team All-American, and the New York State Small School Player of the Year. His high school team was undefeated that year, and won the class B state championship. Anthony "Tony" Collins, the former All-Pro New England Patriot, was a high school classmate and teammate (Collins was also drafted by the Patriots in 1981).

At Princeton University, Crissy was named first-team All-Ivy in 1978 and second-team All-Ivy in 1979 as a running back, and first-team All-Ivy as a wide receiver in 1980. In 1980, he had set the school record for most receptions and most receiving yards by the team's eighth game. He also lettered in Track from 1978 to 1981.

Crissy was released by the Patriots in the 1981 preseason, and signed later that season by the Washington Redskins. He was also a member of their 1982 Super Bowl championship team, although he was on injured reserve all season due to a fractured cheekbone. His college teammate, Bob Holly, was also a reserve quarterback on that team.
