= Joe Lavender =

American football player (born 1949)

No. 30, 20
- Position: Cornerback

Personal information
- Born: February 10, 1949 (age 77); Rayville, Louisiana, U.S.
- Listed height: 6 ft 4 in (1.93 m)
- Listed weight: 190 lb (86 kg)

Career information
- High school: Central Union (El Centro, California)
- College: San Diego State
- NFL draft: 1973: 12th round, 288th overall pick

Career history
- Philadelphia Eagles (1973–1975); Washington Redskins (1976–1982)

Awards and highlights
- Super Bowl champion (XVII); 2× Pro Bowl (1979, 1980)

Career NFL statistics
- Interceptions: 33
- Fumble recoveries: 7
- Touchdowns: 4
- Stats at Pro Football Reference

Joseph Lavender (born February 10, 1949) is an American former professional football player who was a cornerback for 10 seasons in the National Football League (NFL) for the Philadelphia Eagles and the Washington Redskins. He played college football for the San Diego State Aztecs. He was a two-time Pro Bowl section in the NFL with Washington, winning a Super Bowl with them in 1982.

== Early life, education, and college career ==
Born in rural Rayville, Louisiana, Lavender moved with his parents to Southern California as a boy, where he attended Central Union High School in El Centro, California. He played college football at nearby San Diego State from 1969 to 1972. He was selected by the Eagles in the twelfth round of the 1973 NFL draft.

== Professional career ==
On September 23, 1974, the Eagles played the Dallas Cowboys on Monday Night Football in Philadelphia. In the third quarter, Lavender scooped up a fumble at his own four-yard line and returned it 96 yards for a touchdown—the longest such play in Monday Night history. The score also proved to be the difference in the game, as the Eagles won, 13–10. Just six days later, Lavender recorded another defensive touchdown against the Baltimore Colts after picking off a Bert Jones pass and returning it 37 yards for the score.

Traded to Washington in 1976, he replaced Mike Bass as the starting cornerback (with Pat Fischer at the other cornerback position) and had eight interceptions. Lavender pulled down six interceptions apiece in the 1979 and 1980 seasons and was a Pro Bowl selection both years. Hampered by injuries, Lavender was replaced as a starter during the truncated 1982 season, by rookie Vernon Dean. Lavender remained on the team as a backup, and the Redskins won Super Bowl XVII in his final game. Lavender would finish with 33 interceptions in his 139-game career.
