= Alvin Garrett =

American football player (born 1956)

No. 25, 84, 89
- Position: Wide receiver

Personal information
- Born: October 1, 1956 (age 70); Mineral Wells, Texas, U.S.
- Listed height: 5 ft 7 in (1.70 m)
- Listed weight: 178 lb (81 kg)

Career information
- High school: Mineral Wells
- College: Angelo State
- NFL draft: 1979: 9th round, 237th overall pick

Career history
- San Diego Chargers (1979)*; New York Giants (1980–1981); Washington Redskins (1981–1984)
- * Offseason or practice squad member only

Awards and highlights
- Super Bowl champion (XVII)

Career NFL statistics
- Receptions: 32
- Receiving yards: 412
- Receiving touchdowns: 2
- Stats at Pro Football Reference

Alvin Lynn Garrett (born October 1, 1956) is an American former professional football player who was a wide receiver in the National Football League (NFL) for the New York Giants and the Washington Redskins. He won Super Bowl XVII with Washington in the 1982 season.

== College career ==
Before his NFL career, he played college football at Angelo State University, leading the team in receiving in 1977 and 1978. In 1978, the team went 14-0 and won the NAIA Football National Championship, an experience Garrett called his best memory as a football player. Garett finished his two college seasons with 40 receptions for 839 yards and six touchdowns.

== Professional career ==
Garrett was selected 237th overall in the ninth round of the 1979 NFL draft by the San Diego Chargers. He played with the New York Giants from 1980 until November 1981, when he was cut near the end of the season and signed with Washington.

Garrett is best known for replacing injured starter Art Monk in the 1982 NFL playoffs. Although he only caught one pass during the regular season, he caught 13 passes for 231 yards and four touchdowns in Washington's three playoff games. Then in Washington's 27–17 win in Super Bowl XVII, Garrett caught two passes for 13 yards and another touchdown. He also ripped off a 44-yard run on a reverse play during the third quarter, setting up a field goal by kicker Mark Moseley. At the time, it was the longest run by a receiver in Super Bowl history.

Garrett's best season came in 1983 with the Redskins when he played in fifteen games, catching 25 receptions for 332 yards and one touchdown. He went on to catch a pass for 17 yards and gain 100 yards returning kickoffs in Super Bowl XVIII.

Garrett finished his five-season NFL career with 32 receptions for 412 yards and two touchdowns, 43 punt returns for 334 yards, and 50 kickoff returns for 1,013 yards in 55 games.

== The Cosell incident ==
During the first half of the September 5, 1983 Monday Night Football game between the Dallas Cowboys and Washington Redskins, Howard Cosell's commentary on Garrett included "That little monkey gets loose doesn't he?" Cosell's references to Garrett as a "little monkey," ignited a racial controversy that laid the groundwork for Cosell's departure from MNF at the end of the 1983 season. The Rev. Joseph Lowery, then-president of the Southern Christian Leadership Conference, denounced Cosell's comment as racist and demanded a public apology. Despite supportive statements by Jesse Jackson, Muhammad Ali, and Alvin Garrett himself, the fallout contributed to Cosell's decision to leave Monday Night Football following the 1983 season.

"I liked Howard Cosell," Garrett said. "I didn't feel that it was a demeaning statement."

Cosell explained that Garrett's small stature, and not his race, was the basis for his comment, citing the fact that he had used the term to describe his own grandchildren.

Among other evidence to support Cosell's claim is video footage of a 1972 preseason game between the New York Giants and the Kansas City Chiefs that features Cosell referring to athlete Mike Adamle, a 5-foot, 8-inch, 195-pound Caucasian, as a "little monkey."
