= Dan Miller (American football) =

American football player (born 1960)

No. 2, 1
- Position: Placekicker

Personal information
- Born: December 30, 1960 (age 65); West Palm Beach, Florida, U.S.
- Listed height: 5 ft 10 in (1.78 m)
- Listed weight: 172 lb (78 kg)

Career information
- High school: Clewiston (FL)
- College: Miami (FL)
- NFL draft: 1982: 11th round, 281st overall pick

Career history
- Washington Redskins (1982)*; Baltimore Colts (1982); New England Patriots (1982); Jacksonville Bulls (1984); Birmingham Stallions (1984–1985); Atlanta Falcons (1985)*; St. Louis Cardinals (1986)*
- * Offseason or practice squad member only

Awards and highlights
- First-team All-American (1981)

Career NFL statistics
- Field goals: 6
- Field goal attempts: 11
- Field goal %: 54.5
- Longest field goal: 58
- Stats at Pro Football Reference

Daniel Scott "Danny" Miller (born December 30, 1960) is an American former professional football player who was a kicker in the National Football League (NFL) and the United States Football League (USFL).

Miller was born in West Palm Beach, Florida and played scholastically at nearby Clewiston High School. He played collegiately for the Miami Hurricanes, where he accumulated 10 school records and graduated as the best kicker in team history. As a senior, he was honored by Football News as a first-team All-American.

Miller was selected 281st overall by the Washington Redskins in the eleventh-round of the 1982 NFL draft. In training camp he competed with veteran Mark Moseley for the position, with Mosely ultimately being given the nod. Rather than releasing Miller, the Redskins opted to keep him on their taxi squad, as insurance should Mosely falter. He was released a few days after the season opener. A players' strike interrupted the 1982 season, causing the cancellation of weeks 3 through 10. When play resumed, Miller was signed by the New England Patriots. He kicked in two games for them, but was not impressive on kickoffs, and was released when the team reactivated veteran John Smith from the injured reserve list.

Miller was signed by the Baltimore Colts with three weeks left in the season. His first game he was 2 for 2 on extra points and 2 for 2 on field goals in regulation. However, his game-winning attempt in overtime was blocked, as the game ended in a tie. The next week he was again 2/2 and 2/2, including a 58-yard field goal that was, at the time, the third longest in NFL history. Miller was with the Colts during the 1983 preseason, but was cut when they traded for rookie Raúl Allegre.

A month later he was signed by the Jacksonville Bulls of the USFL. He was with them for the first three games of the 1984 season, released, and signed with the Birmingham Stallions. With the Stallions, Miller finally secured a starting job, going 60 for 62 on extra points and 10 for 15 on field goals the remainder of the season. The following year he was 49/52 and 19/28.

Following the USFL season, Miller had a tryout with the Atlanta Falcons but was released midway through the preseason. In 1986 he signed with the St. Louis Cardinals, but was again released during preseason.

His nephew, Andrew Miller, is a former MLB pitcher.
