= Tony Peters =

American football player (born 1953)

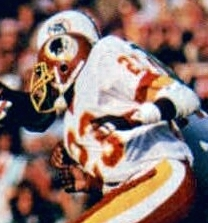
- Peters playing for the Redskins in Super Bowl XVII

No. 20, 23
- Position: Safety / Cornerback

Personal information
- Born: April 28, 1953 (age 73); Oklahoma City, Oklahoma, U.S.
- Listed height: 6 ft 1 in (1.85 m)
- Listed weight: 187 lb (85 kg)

Career information
- High school: Pauls Valley (OK)
- College: Oklahoma
- NFL draft: 1975: 4th round, 82nd overall pick

Career history
- Cleveland Browns (1975–1978); Washington Redskins (1979–1985)

Awards and highlights
- Super Bowl champion (XVII); Pro Bowl (1982); National champion (1974); Second-team All-Big Eight (1974)

Career NFL statistics
- Interceptions: 16
- Fumble recoveries: 4
- Sacks: 3
- Stats at Pro Football Reference

Anthony Lemont Peters (born April 28, 1953) is an American former professional football player who was a safety for 10 seasons in the National Football League (NFL) for the Cleveland Browns and Washington Redskins.

Born in Pauls Valley, Oklahoma, Peters played college football for the Oklahoma Sooners at the University of Oklahoma. He and his wife, Jewell, have two children. Jewell died in 2017. Peters' half-brother, Charles Bray, played for the Toronto Argonauts in the Canadian Football League (CFL).

Peters helped the Washington Redskins win Super Bowl XVII, and earned Pro Bowl honors for the 1982 season.

On August 3, 1983, Peters was arrested by the Drug Enforcement Administration (DEA) at the Washington Redskins' training camp in Carlisle, Pennsylvania, accused of having taken $3,000 from an undercover DEA agent in return for assisting in two cocaine deals in Northern Virginia in the summer of 1983. He was one of eight men charged in a drug conspiracy to sell $115,000 worth of cocaine in the Washington area. On September 2, 1983, Peters pleaded guilty to conspiracy to traffic cocaine. The same day, he was suspended indefinitely by the NFL. On October 8, 1983, Peters was fined $10,000, placed on four years' probation and ordered to perform 500 hours of community work. In June 1984, NFL Commissioner Pete Rozelle declared that Peters was eligible to resume playing for the Redskins. Peters completed the terms of his plea deal and went on to be a successful high school football coach and social studies teacher in Texas and Oklahoma. He currently lives in Tulsa.
