= Mike Williams (tight end) =

American football player (born 1959)

No. 84
- Position: Tight end

Personal information
- Born: August 27, 1959 (age 67); LaFayette, Alabama, U.S.
- Listed height: 6 ft 4 in (1.93 m)
- Listed weight: 249 lb (113 kg)

Career information
- High school: Lafayette
- College: Alabama A&M
- NFL draft: 1982: 5th round, 133rd overall pick

Career history
- Washington Redskins (1982–1984)

Awards and highlights
- Super Bowl champion (XVII)

Career NFL statistics
- Receptions: 3
- Receiving yards: 14
- Stats at Pro Football Reference

Michael Williams (born August 27, 1959) is an American former professional football player who was a tight end for the Washington Redskins of the National Football League (NFL). He played college football for the Alabama A&M Bulldogs and was selected in the fifth round of the 1982 NFL draft with the 133rd overall pick.
