= Charlie Brown (wide receiver, born 1958) =

American football player (born 1958)

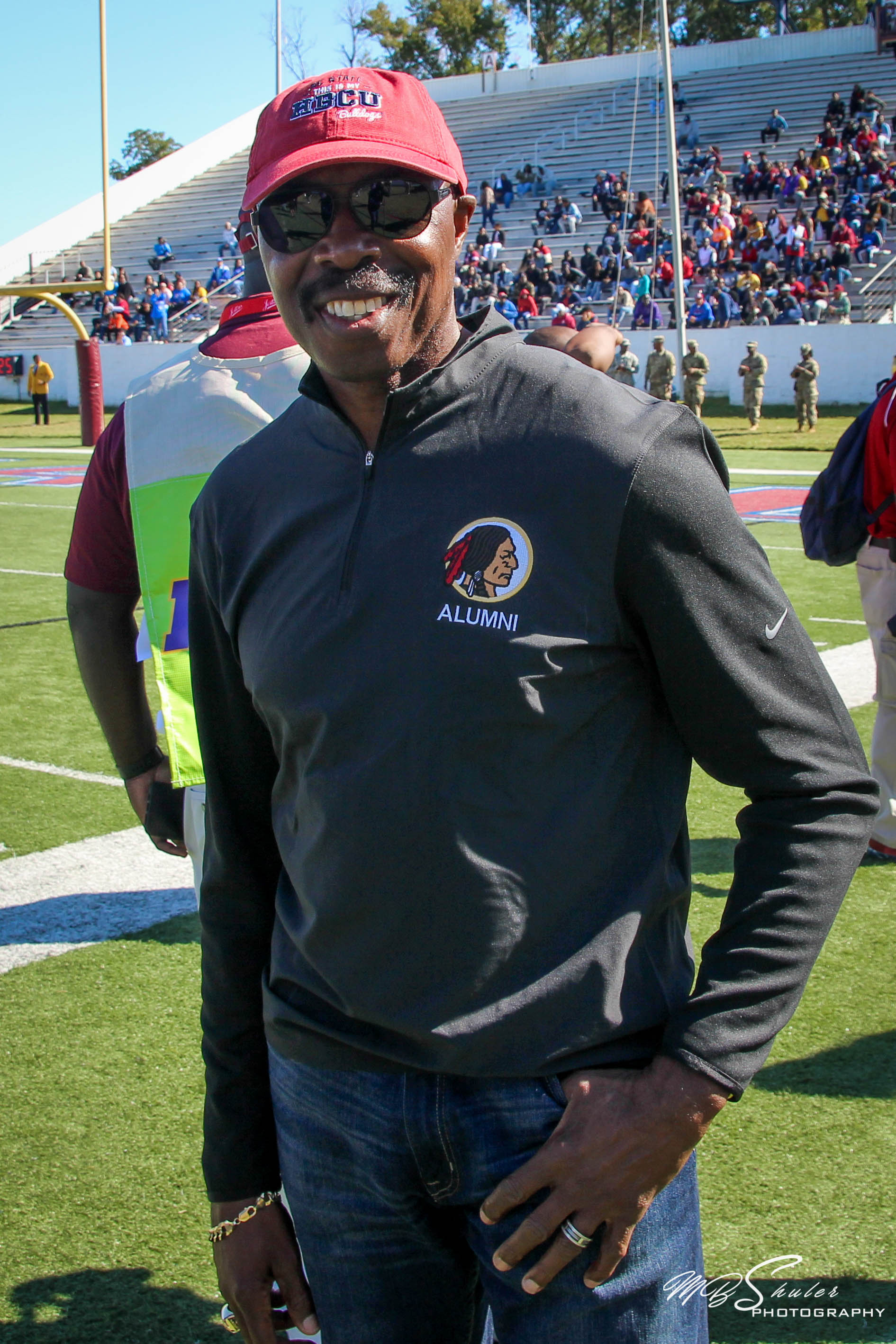
- Brown in 2019

No. 87, 89
- Position: Wide receiver

Personal information
- Born: October 29, 1958 (age 68); Charleston, South Carolina, U.S.
- Listed height: 5 ft 10 in (1.78 m)
- Listed weight: 182 lb (83 kg)

Career information
- High school: St. John's Island (SC)
- College: South Carolina State
- NFL draft: 1981: 8th round, 201st overall pick

Career history
- Washington Redskins (1982–1984); Atlanta Falcons (1985–1987); Indianapolis Colts (1988)*; Washington Commandos (1990)
- * Offseason or practice squad member only

Awards and highlights
- Super Bowl champion (XVII); 2× Pro Bowl (1982, 1983); PFWA All-Rookie Team (1982)

Career NFL statistics
- Receptions: 220
- Receiving yards: 3,548
- Receiving touchdowns: 25
- Stats at Pro Football Reference

Career AFL statistics
- Receptions: 11
- Receiving yards: 129
- Touchdowns: 2
- Stats at ArenaFan.com

Charles Brown (born October 29, 1958) is an American former professional football player who was a wide receiver in the National Football League (NFL) for six seasons. He played for the Washington Redskins, helping them win Super Bowl XVII in his rookie season, and Atlanta Falcons. He was traded by the Redskins to the Falcons on August 26, 1985, in exchange for Pro Bowl guard R.C. Thielemann. He was nicknamed "Good ol' Charlie Brown" in reference to the eponymous comic strip character.

He played college football at South Carolina State University and was selected 201st overall in the eighth round of the 1981 NFL draft. Brown played wide receiver and defensive back for the Washington Commandos of the Arena Football League in 1990. He was slated to be a receiver for the Washington Marauders of the Professional Spring Football League in 1992, but the league never got off the ground.

Brown was head coach of the Savannah High Blue Jackets (Savannah, Georgia) of the Savannah Chatham County Football League. He is currently wide receivers coach of Marlboro County High School Bulldogs varsity football team in Bennettsville, South Carolina.

== NFL career statistics ==
Legend
	Won the Super Bowl
**Bold**	Career high

=== Regular season ===
Year	Team	Games		Receiving				
Year	Team	GP	GS	Rec	Yds	Avg	Lng	TD
1982	WAS	9	9	32	690	**21.6**	**78**	**8**
1983	WAS	15	13	**78**	**1,225**	15.7	75	**8**
1984	WAS	9	4	18	200	11.1	36	3
1985	ATL	13	9	24	412	17.2	48	2
1986	ATL	**16**	**15**	63	918	14.6	42	4
1987	ATL	6	0	5	103	20.6	23	0
		68	50	220	3,548	16.1	78	25

=== Playoffs ===
Year	Team	Games		Receiving				
Year	Team	GP	GS	Rec	Yds	Avg	Lng	TD
1982	WAS	**4**	**4**	**17**	242	14.2	45	**2**
1983	WAS	3	3	14	**401**	**28.6**	**70**	1
1984	WAS	1	0	0	0	0.0	0	0
		8	7	31	643	20.7	70	3

== Personal life ==
Charlie Brown is married to journalist Tonya Brown of WPDE.

Brown was inducted into the 2024 Hall of Fame Class of the Mid-Eastern Athletic Conference.
