= Greg Williams (safety) =

American football player (born 1959)

No. 47
- Position: Safety

Personal information
- Born: August 1, 1959 (age 67); Greenville, Mississippi, U.S.
- Listed height: 5 ft 11 in (1.80 m)
- Listed weight: 185 lb (84 kg)

Career information
- High school: Greenville Christian
- College: Mississippi State
- NFL draft: 1982: undrafted

Career history
- Washington Redskins (1982–1985)

Awards and highlights
- Super Bowl champion (XVII)

Career NFL statistics
- Games played: 57
- Interceptions: 2
- Fumbles recovered: 6
- Stats at Pro Football Reference

Gregory Williams (born August 1, 1959) is an American former professional football player who was a safety in the National Football League (NFL) for the Washington Redskins. He played college football for the Mississippi State Bulldogs.

== Early life ==
Williams was born in Greenville, Mississippi, where he attended and high school football at Greenville Christian School. He then attended and played college football at Mississippi Delta Junior College, before transferring to Mississippi State University in 1979.

== Professional career ==
Williams was signed by the Washington Redskins in 1982 and won Super Bowl XVII with the Redskins that same year.
