= Jeff Hayes =

American football player (born 1959)

No. 5
- Position: Punter

Personal information
- Born: August 19, 1959 (age 67); Elkin, North Carolina, U.S.
- Listed height: 5 ft 11 in (1.80 m)
- Listed weight: 175 lb (79 kg)

Career information
- High school: Elkin
- College: North Carolina (1978–1981)
- NFL draft: 1982: undrafted

Career history
- Washington Redskins (1982–1985); Cincinnati Bengals (1986); Miami Dolphins (1987)

Awards and highlights
- Super Bowl champion (XVII); First-team All-ACC (1981)

Career NFL statistics
- Punts: 274
- Punt yards: 10,471
- Punt yard average: 38.2
- Long: 59
- Inside 20: 66
- Stats at Pro Football Reference

Jeffrey Clyde Hayes (born August 19, 1959) is an American former professional football player who was a punter in the National Football League (NFL) for the Washington Redskins, Cincinnati Bengals, and the Miami Dolphins. He played college football for the North Carolina Tar Heels. He played with the Redskins in Super Bowl XVII and XVIII.

Hayes made 274 punts in the NFL, with a longest punt of 59 yards in 1984 game, a total of 10,471 yards with a career average of 38.2 yards per punt. He scored one touchdown, running for a 61-yard touchdown while playing for the Bengals against the Pittsburgh Steelers via a fake punt in 1986, where he evaded two tackles. While playing for Washington, he made four rushing attempts that included a 24-yard run in 1984, following a 48-yard run in 1983. He finished his career with 168 rushing yards from 7 attempts.

His 61-yard run is the longest touchdown run for a kicker or punter, and was the longest run for those positions until Reggie Hodges's 68-yard non-touchdown run in a 2010 game against the New Orleans Saints.
