= Bobby Beathard =

American football executive (1937–2023)

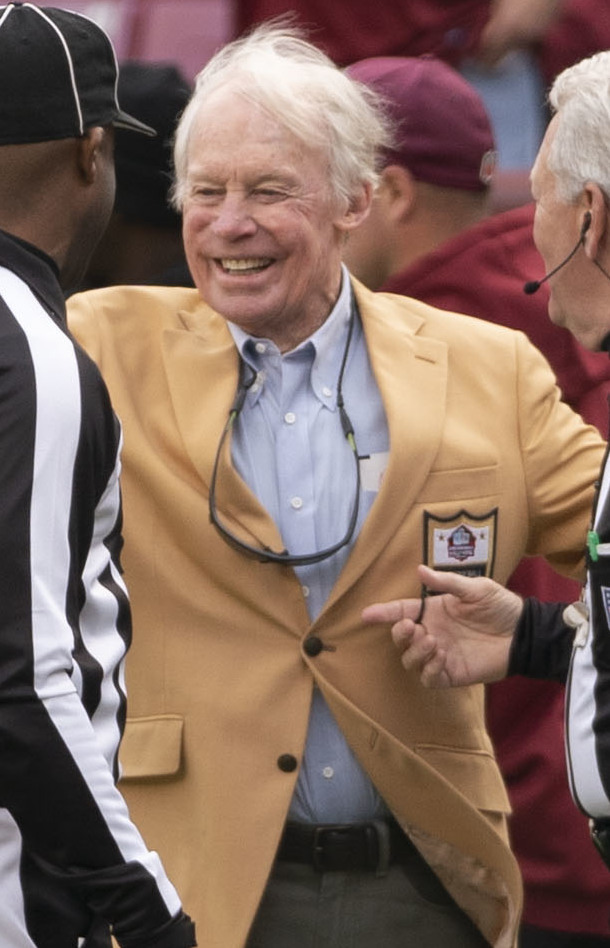
- Beathard in 2018

No. 15
- Position: Quarterback

Personal information
- Born: January 24, 1937; Zanesville, Ohio, U.S.
- Died: January 30, 2023 (aged 86); Franklin, Tennessee, U.S.

Career information
- High school: El Segundo (El Segundo, California)
- College: El Camino (1955); Cal Poly (1956–1958)
- NFL draft: 1959: undrafted

Career history

Playing
- Washington Redskins (1959)*; San Diego Chargers (1961)*
- * Offseason or practice squad member only

Operations
- Kansas City Chiefs (1963, 1966–1967) Scout; Atlanta Falcons (1968–1971) Scout; Miami Dolphins (1972–1977) Director of player personnel; Washington Redskins (1978–1988) General manager; San Diego Chargers (1990–2000) General manager

Awards and highlights
- 4× Super Bowl champion (VII, VIII, XVII, XXII); Washington Commanders Ring of Fame; Washington Commanders 90 Greatest; Los Angeles Chargers Hall of Fame
- Executive profile at Pro Football Reference
- Pro Football Hall of Fame

Robert King Beathard Jr. (/ˈbɛθərd/ BETH-ərd; January 24, 1937 – January 30, 2023) was an American professional football executive who was the general manager for the Washington Redskins (1978–1988) and the San Diego Chargers (1990–2000) of the National Football League (NFL). His teams won four Super Bowls and competed in three others during his 38 years in the NFL, doing so with the Kansas City Chiefs (1966), Miami Dolphins (1972 and 1973), Redskins (1982, 1983, and 1987), and the Chargers (1994). Beathard was inducted into the Pro Football Hall of Fame in 2018.

== Early life and playing career ==
Beathard was born in Zanesville, Ohio, before moving to El Segundo, California, at the age of four. He attended El Segundo High School but did not begin playing football until his sophomore year, as a tailback. In college, he accepted a scholarship to play football for LSU, but returned home after summer practices after feeling homesick. He then enrolled at El Camino Junior College for a year before enrolling at Cal Poly, where he played as a backup running back and later the starting quarterback and defensive back, leading the Mustangs to back-to-back 9–1 seasons.

From 1956 through 1958, Beathard compiled 1,748 passing yards, 198 rushing yards, and intercepted 13 passes in the Cal Poly secondary. He went undrafted in 1959 and had preseason stints with two professional teams, but was unable to find a spot, spending his early post-college years playing semi-pro football and working various non-football jobs.

== Executive career ==
=== Scout ===
Beathard joined the Kansas City Chiefs as a part-time scout in 1963. He left the Chiefs for the American Football League before returning to Kansas City in 1966. Beathard then served as a scout for the Atlanta Falcons from 1968 through 1971. He was named director of player personnel for the Miami Dolphins in 1972, succeeding Joe Thomas. From 1972 to 1973, the Dolphins would go 26–2 with two Super Bowl victories, including a perfect season in 1972.

=== General manager ===
Beathard was named general manager of the Washington Redskins in 1978. Prominent draft picks for the Redskins under his tenure include Art Monk, Mark May, Russ Grimm, Dexter Manley, Charlie Brown, Darrell Green, Charles Mann, and Gary Clark. Beathard resigned from the team prior to the 1989 NFL draft and spent that year as a studio analyst with NFL on NBC. In 1990, Beathard became the general manager of the San Diego Chargers. In 1994, the organization won the AFC Championship and appeared in its first Super Bowl. He retired in 2000.

== Personal life ==
Beathard resided with his wife Christine in Franklin, Tennessee. Beathard's younger brother, Pete Beathard, was a quarterback at USC, the Kansas City Chiefs and the Houston Oilers. One of Beathard's sons, Casey Beathard, is a country music songwriter. Another son, Kurt Beathard, is a football coach, formerly the offensive coordinator for Illinois State. A third son, Jeff, is a scout for the Commanders, and was Mr. Irrelevant, being the last pick in the 1988 NFL draft.

His grandson, Jeffery "Bobo" Beathard, played four years at Appalachian State University as a wide receiver; while other grandsons, C. J. Beathard and Tucker Beathard, are a quarterback and a singer-songwriter respectively. Another of Beathard's grandsons, Clayton Beathard, was fatally stabbed in a bar fight in Nashville, Tennessee, in 2019.

Beathard participated in the 1984 New York City Marathon. From 2005 to 2009, Beathard was a consecutive 5 time first-place winner in the men's age 65 and over group at the World Bodysurfing Championships held annually in Oceanside, California. Beathard was inducted into the Cal Poly Mustangs Athletics Hall of Fame in 1988. He was inducted into the Pro Football Hall of Fame and Chargers Hall of Fame in 2018. Beathard died on January 30, 2023, from Alzheimer's disease at his home in Franklin, Tennessee.
