= Mat Mendenhall =

American football player (born 1957)

No. 76
- Position: Defensive end

Personal information
- Born: May 14, 1957 (age 69); Salt Lake City, Utah, U.S.
- Listed height: 6 ft 6 in (1.98 m)
- Listed weight: 254 lb (115 kg)

Career information
- High school: Salt Lake City (UT) East
- College: BYU
- NFL draft: 1980: 2nd round, 55th overall pick

Career history
- Washington Redskins (1981–1982)

Awards and highlights
- Super Bowl champion (XVII)

Career NFL statistics
- Sacks: 2
- Fumble recoveries: 2
- Stats at Pro Football Reference

Matthew W. Mendenhall (born May 14, 1957) is an American former professional football player who was a defensive end for two seasons in the National Football League (NFL) for the Washington Redskins before numerous injuries and alcoholism ended his career. He started in Super Bowl XVII as his Redskins defeated the Miami Dolphins for the NFL Championship in 1982.

He played college football for the BYU Cougars after attending East High School. He is the older brother of current Utah State Aggies and former New Mexico Lobos/BYU Cougars/Virginia Cavaliers head football coach Bronco Mendenhall.
