= Larry Kubin =

American football player (born 1959)

No. 50, 59
- Position: Linebacker

Personal information
- Born: February 26, 1959 (age 67); Union Township, New Jersey, U.S.
- Listed height: 6 ft 2 in (1.88 m)
- Listed weight: 234 lb (106 kg)

Career information
- High school: Union
- College: Penn State
- NFL draft: 1981: 6th round, 148th overall pick

Career history
- Washington Redskins (1981–1984); Buffalo Bills (1985); Tampa Bay Buccaneers (1985); Kansas City Chiefs (1986)*
- * Offseason or practice squad member only

Awards and highlights
- Super Bowl champion (XVII); 2× Second-team All-East (1978, 1979) MVP 1979 Liberty Bowl with record 4 sacks

Career NFL statistics
- Sacks: 0.5
- Fumble recoveries: 1
- Stats at Pro Football Reference

Lawrence William Kubin Jr. (born February 26, 1959) is an American former professional football player who was a linebacker in the National Football League (NFL) with the Washington Redskins from 1981 to 1984 (including two Super Bowls XVII and XVIII), and in 1985 with the Buffalo Bills and Tampa Bay Buccaneers. He played college football for the Penn State Nittany Lions, setting a new career record of 30 sacks and the single season sack record of 15 for Penn State.

Kubin played high school football at Union High School in Union Township, New Jersey.
