= LeCharls McDaniel =

American football player and coach (born 1958)

No. 46, 33
- Position: Cornerback

Personal information
- Born: October 15, 1958 (age 68); Fort Bragg, North Carolina, U.S.
- Listed height: 5 ft 9 in (1.75 m)
- Listed weight: 183 lb (83 kg)

Career information
- High school: Seaside (CA)
- College: Cal Poly
- NFL draft: 1981: undrafted

Career history

Playing
- Washington Redskins (1981–1982); New York Giants (1983)

Coaching
- Hartnell (1986–1988) Defensive backs & special teams coach; San Diego Chargers (1989–1991) Assistant special teams coach; Cal Poly (1989–1991) Defensive backs & special teams coach; Phoenix Cardinals (1993) Wide receivers coach; San Diego State (1994–1996) Wide receivers coach; Washington Redskins (1998–2000) Special teams coach; California (2001) Special teams coach; San Diego State (2002) Wide receivers coach; Oregon State (2003–2004) Special teams and tight ends coach; San Diego State (2005–2014) Wide receivers coach; San Diego (2015) Wide receivers coach

Awards and highlights
- Super Bowl champion (XVII); NCAA Division II national champion (1980)
- Stats at Pro Football Reference

LeCharls Barnet McDaniel (born October 15, 1958) is an American football coach and former cornerback who played in the National Football League (NFL) for the Washington Redskins and the New York Giants.

== Early life and college ==
He played high school football at Seaside High School. LeCharls played college football at California Polytechnic State University, where he earned his bachelor's degree in social science. He was also a contributor on the team that won the 1980 Division II National Championship.

He redshirted in 1976, played sparingly in 1977, and then was a three-year starter at Cal Poly from 1978 through 1980. As a Mustang, he intercepted 13 passes and scored three touchdowns while serving as a team captain twice.

== NFL career ==
McDaniel spent his first two pro seasons, 1981 and 1982, with Washington. He intercepted one pass in the regular season, recording a 7-yard return during a 28–0 Washington rout of then-St. Louis on January 2, 1983.

He then played for the New York Giants in 1983 and 1984.

== Coaching ==
McDaniel began his coaching career in 1986, and coached almost the next 30 years either in college or pro capacities, assigned to defensive backs, wide receivers and special teams.
