= Todd Liebenstein =

American football player (born 1960)

No. 79
- Position: Defensive end

Personal information
- Born: January 9, 1960 (age 66); Grand Rapids, Wisconsin, U.S.
- Listed height: 6 ft 6 in (1.98 m)
- Listed weight: 253 lb (115 kg)

Career information
- High school: Las Vegas (NV) Valley
- College: UNLV
- NFL draft: 1982: 4th round, 99th overall pick

Career history
- Washington Redskins (1982–1985)

Awards and highlights
- Super Bowl champion (XVII); UNLV Football Hall of Fame

Career NFL statistics
- Sacks: 2.5
- Fumble recoveries: 2
- Stats at Pro Football Reference

Todd Edward Liebenstein (born January 9, 1960) is an American former professional football player who was a defensive end for the Washington Redskins of the National Football League (NFL) from 1982 to 1985. He played college football for the UNLV Rebels. He was a starter in Super Bowl XVIII.

After his football career, Liebenstein became a history teacher for Fairfax County Public Schools. Over the next 30 years he instructed students at South Lakes High School and Herndon High School until his retirement on May 11, 2022.
