= Vernon Dean =

American football player (born 1959)

DC Defenders
- Title: Defensive backs coach

Personal information
- Born: May 5, 1959 (age 67); Houston, Texas, U.S.
- Listed height: 5 ft 11 in (1.80 m)
- Listed weight: 178 lb (81 kg)

Career information
- Position: Cornerback (No. 32, 31)
- High school: Los Angeles (Los Angeles, California)
- College: San Diego State
- NFL draft: 1982: 2nd round, 49th overall pick

Career history

Playing
- Washington Redskins (1982–1987); Seattle Seahawks (1988)

Coaching
- Georgetown (1990–1991) Defensive backs coach; Georgetown (1992–1993) Defensive coordinator; Bishop O'Dowd HS (CA) (1997–1999) Defensive backs coach; Western Oregon (2000–2001) Defensive backs coach; Western Illinois (2002) Defensive backs coach; Kansas City Chiefs (2003–2006) Defensive backs coach; Fort Valley State (2009) Defensive backs coach; Arkansas–Pine Bluff (2010–2011) Linebackers coach & special teams coach; Kentucky State (2013–2015) Defensive coordinator & linebackers coach; Virginia State (2017–2021) Defensive backs; DC Defenders (2023–present) Defensive backs

Awards and highlights
- 2× Super Bowl champion (XVII, XXII); UFL champion (2025); PFWA All-Rookie Team (1982); First-team All-WAC (1981)
- Stats at Pro Football Reference

Wellington Vernon Dean (born May 5, 1959) is an American football coach and former player who is the defensive backs coach for the DC Defenders of the United Football League (UFL). He played professionally as a cornerback in the National Football League (NFL), primarily for the Washington Redskins, with whom he won two Super Bowls.

Dean played college football for the San Diego State Aztecs and was selected by Washington in the second round of the 1982 NFL draft. He also played for the Seattle Seahawks.

== Professional career ==
Dean played seven seasons in the NFL, six with the Washington Redskins. His finest season was in 1984, when he picked off 7 passes and had 114 int return yards and scored two touchdowns. He appeared in 101 games throughout his career, and finished with 22 interceptions and two touchdowns.

== Coaching career ==
Dean was the defensive backs coach at Virginia State University from 2017 to 2021.

Dean was hired by the DC Defenders on September 13, 2022.
