= Bob Holly (American football) =

American football player (born 1960)

No. 8
- Position: Quarterback

Personal information
- Born: June 1, 1960 (age 66); Clifton, New Jersey, U.S.
- Listed height: 6 ft 2 in (1.88 m)
- Listed weight: 200 lb (91 kg)

Career information
- High school: Clifton
- College: Princeton
- NFL draft: 1982: 11th round, 291st overall pick

Career history
- Washington Redskins (1982–1983); Philadelphia Eagles (1984); Atlanta Falcons (1984–1985)

Awards and highlights
- Super Bowl champion (XVII)

Career NFL statistics
- Passing yards: 300
- TD–INT: 1-2
- Passer rating: 72.9
- Stats at Pro Football Reference

Robert Charles Holly, Jr. (born June 1, 1960) is an American former professional football player who was a quarterback in the National Football League (NFL) for the Washington Redskins, Philadelphia Eagles and Atlanta Falcons. He played college football for the Princeton Tigers.

Born and raised in Clifton, New Jersey, Holly attended Clifton High School.

He attracted the attention of NFL scouts at Princeton University in 1981 when he set a school record by throwing for 501 yards against Yale, and scoring the go-ahead touchdown on a keeper himself late in the game in a 35–31 victory, Princeton's first over arch-rival Yale since 1966. That year, he set a school record (since broken) by throwing for 2,668 yards, and was named first-team All-Ivy.

He was drafted in the 11th round by the Redskins in 1982, and served as the backup to Joe Theismann that season, in which the Redskins won the Super Bowl. He played in 5 regular season games for the Redskins in 1983, completing his only pass attempt, and he appeared in one playoff game, completing the two passes he attempted.

He was a member of the Philadelphia Eagles and Atlanta Falcons in 1984, but did not appear in any games. He played in four games for the Falcons in 1985, completing 24 of 39 passes for 295 yards and one touchdown.

He was injured in a car accident in the off-season after the 1985 season, and retired from pro football.
