= 1981 Washington Redskins season =

NFL team season

- Owner: Jack Kent Cooke
- General manager: Bobby Beathard
- President: Edward Bennett Williams
- Head coach: Joe Gibbs
- Offensive coordinator: Joe Bugel
- Defensive coordinator: Richie Petitbon
- Home stadium: RFK Stadium

Results
- Record: 8–8
- Division place: 4th NFC East
- Playoffs: Did not qualify

The 1981 Washington Redskins season was the franchise's 50th season in the National Football League (NFL) and their 44th in Washington, D.C. The team improved on their 6–10 record from 1980, finishing 8–8, but would miss the playoffs for the fifth consecutive season. This was Joe Gibbs' first season as head coach. The team slumped early, losing its first 5 games before defeating the Chicago Bears 24–7 at Soldier Field; they would then lose to the Miami Dolphins to sit at 1–6.

Washington would do better in the second half, winning their next 4 games to reach 5–6 and looking like they were going to make the playoffs. However, losses to the Dallas Cowboys and Buffalo Bills eliminated them from postseason contention. The team would win its final 3 games to end the season at 8–8, including a close victory at RFK Stadium against the defending NFC Champion Philadelphia Eagles.

== Offseason ==
=== NFL draft ===
1981 Washington Redskins draft
Round	Pick	Player	Position	College	Notes
1	20	Mark May *	Guard	Pittsburgh	
3	69	Russ Grimm * ^{†}	Guard	Pittsburgh	
4	90	Tom Flick	Quarterback	Washington	
5	119	Dexter Manley *	Defensive end	Oklahoma State	
5	132	Gary Sayre	Guard	Cameron	
6	148	Larry Kubin	Linebacker	Penn State	
8	201	Charlie Brown *	Wide receiver	South Carolina State	
9	231	Darryl Grant	Guard	Rice	
10	257	Phil Kessel	Quarterback	Northern Michigan	
10	267	Allan Kennedy	Offensive tackle	Washington State	
11	284	Jerry Hill	Wide receiver	North Alabama	
12	314	Clint Didier	Tight end	Portland State	
Made roster † Pro Football Hall of Fame * Made at least one Pro Bowl during career

=== Undrafted free agents ===
1981 undrafted free agents of note
Player	Position	College
Joe Jacoby	Tackle	Louisville
Mel Kaufman	Linebacker	Cal Poly
LeCharls McDaniel	Cornerback	Cal Poly
Jay Megna	Defensive back	East Tennessee State

== Personnel ==
=== Staff ===
1981 Washington Redskins staff
Front office: Chairman of the Board/Chief Executive Officer – Jack Kent Cooke; President – Edward Bennett Williams; General manager – Bobby Beathard; Assistant general manager – Bobby Mitchell; Assistant general manager – Joel Margolis; Assistant general manager – Dick Meyers; Director of player personnel – Mike Allman; Director of Pro Scouting – Kirk Mee; Director of College Scouting – Dick Daniels; Personnel Scouts – Charley Casserly, Charley Taylor; Head coaches: Head coach – Joe Gibbs; Assistant head coach – Dan Henning; Offensive coaches: Offensive Coordinator – Joe Bugel; Offensive Backfield – Don Breaux; Tight Ends/Offensive Scouting Reports – Rennie Simmons	Defensive coaches: Defensive Coordinator – Richie Petitbon; Defensive Line – LaVern Torgeson; Linebackers – Larry Peccatiello; Admin. Asst./Defensive Scouting Reports – Bill Hickman; Special teams coaches: Special Teams – Wayne Sevier

=== Roster ===
1981 Washington Redskins roster
Quarterbacks (QB): 12 Tom Flick; 7 Joe Theismann; Running backs (RB): 35 Rickey Claitt; 30 Nick Giaquinto; 26 Terry Metcalf; 44 John Riggins; 25 Joe Washington; Wide receivers (WR): 81 Art Monk; 80 Virgil Seay; 83 Ricky Thompson; Tight ends (TE): 86 Bob Raba; 88 Rick Walker; 85 Don Warren	Offensive linemen (OL): 53 Jeff Bostic C; 79 Mike Daum T; 77 Darryl Grant G/T; 68 Russ Grimm G; 66 Joe Jacoby T; 61 Melvin Jones G; 73 Mark May T; 64 Ron Saul G; 74 George Starke T; Defensive linemen (DL): 69 Perry Brooks DT; 65 Dave Butz DT; 99 Calvin Clark DE; 78 Dallas Hickman DE; 71 Karl Lorch DE; 72 Dexter Manley DE; 76 Mat Mendenhall DE; 79 Pat Ogrin DT	Linebackers (LB): 51 Monte Coleman OLB; 54 Peter Cronan MLB; 59 Brad Dusek OLB; 56 Quentin Lowry OLB; 57 Rich Milot OLB; Defensive backs (DB): 22 Curtis Jordan SS; 20 Joe Lavender CB; 46 LeCharls McDaniel CB; 29 Mark Murphy FS; 21 Mike Nelms FS; 24 Lemar Parrish CB; 23 Tony Peters SS; 45 Jeris White CB; Special teams (ST): 10 Mike Connell P; 3 Mark Moseley K	Reserve: 87 Charlie Brown WR (IR); 82 Rich Caster TE (IR); 75 Mike Clark DE (IR); 28 Cris Crissy CB (IR); 63 Fred Dean G (IR); 86 Clint Didier TE (IR); 89 Alvin Garrett WR (IR); 38 Clarence Harmon RB (IR); 40 Wilbur Jackson RB (IR); 55 Mel Kaufman OLB (IR); 11 Phil Kessel QB (IR); 50 Larry Kubin LB (IR); -- Bob Kuziel C (IR); 84 Greg McCrary TE (IR); 52 Neal Olkewicz LB (IR); -- Dan Peiffer C (IR); -- Gary Sayre G (Left squad); 76 Jerry Scanlan T (IR); 47 Ray Waddy CB (PUP); 58 Charlie Weaver LB (IR); 39 Otis Wonsley RB (IR); Rookies in italics

== Regular season ==
=== Schedule ===
Week	Date	Opponent	Result	Record	Venue	Attendance	Recap
1	September 6	**Dallas Cowboys**	**L** 10–26	0–1	RFK Stadium	55,045	Recap
2	September 13	**New York Giants**	**L** 7–17	0–2	RFK Stadium	53,343	Recap
3	September 20	at **St. Louis Cardinals**	**L** 30–40	0–3	Busch Memorial Stadium	47,592	Recap
4	September 27	at **Philadelphia Eagles**	**L** 13–36	0–4	Veterans Stadium	70,664	Recap
5	October 4	San Francisco 49ers	**L** 17–30	0–5	RFK Stadium	51,843	Recap
6	October 11	at Chicago Bears	**W** 24–7	1–5	Soldier Field	57,683	Recap
7	October 18	at Miami Dolphins	**L** 10–13	1–6	Miami Orange Bowl	47,367	Recap
8	October 25	New England Patriots	**W** 24–22	2–6	RFK Stadium	50,394	Recap
9	November 1	**St. Louis Cardinals**	**W** 42–21	3–6	RFK Stadium	50,643	Recap
10	November 8	Detroit Lions	**W** 33–31	4–6	RFK Stadium	52,096	Recap
11	November 15	at **New York Giants**	**W** 30–27 (OT)	5–6	Giants Stadium	63,133	Recap
12	November 22	at **Dallas Cowboys**	**L** 10–24	5–7	Texas Stadium	64,587	Recap
13	November 29	at Buffalo Bills	**L** 14–21	5–8	Rich Stadium	59,624	Recap
14	December 6	**Philadelphia Eagles**	**W** 15–13	6–8	RFK Stadium	52,206	Recap
15	December 13	Baltimore Colts	**W** 38–14	7–8	RFK Stadium	46,706	Recap
16	December 20	at Los Angeles Rams	**W** 30–7	8–8	Anaheim Stadium	52,224	Recap
Note: Intra-division opponents are in **bold** text.

=== Standings ===
NFC East
	W	L	T	PCT	DIV	CONF	PF	PA	STK
^{(2)} Dallas Cowboys	12	4	0	.750	6–2	8–4	367	277	L1
^{(4)} Philadelphia Eagles	10	6	0	.625	4–4	7–5	368	221	W1
^{(5)} New York Giants	9	7	0	.563	5–3	8–6	295	257	W3
Washington Redskins	8	8	0	.500	3–5	6–6	347	349	W3
St. Louis Cardinals	7	9	0	.438	2–6	4–8	315	408	L2
