= Ken Huff =

American football player (born 1953)

- Huff in 1977

No. 62, 61
- Position: Guard

Personal information
- Born: February 21, 1953 (age 73); Hutchinson, Kansas, U.S.
- Listed height: 6 ft 4 in (1.93 m)
- Listed weight: 260 lb (118 kg)

Career information
- High school: Coronado (CA)
- College: North Carolina
- NFL draft: 1975: 1st round, 3rd overall pick

Career history
- Baltimore Colts (1975–1982); Washington Redskins (1983–1985)

Awards and highlights
- Consensus All-American (1974); First-team All-ACC (1974); North Carolina Tar Heels Jersey No. 68 honored; North Carolina Sports Hall of Fame (2008); Walter Camp Foundation Alumni of the Year (2013); Jacobs Trophy; Jim Tatum Medal; Bill Arnold Award

Career NFL statistics
- Games played: 145
- Starts: 104
- Stats at Pro Football Reference

Kenneth Wayne Huff (born February 21, 1953) is an American former professional football player who was an offensive lineman in the National Football League (NFL). He was also an All-American guard at the University of North Carolina.

== College career ==
Huff was heavily recruited from Deerfield Academy, Deerfield, Massachusetts, where he spent a postgraduate year after Coronado High School outside of San Diego, California. Initially a defensive tackle until UNC Coach Bill Dooley switched him to guard in his second day of practice, he immediately became a starter on the offensive line. As a sophomore, he helped lead the University of North Carolina to an 11-1 Atlantic Coast Conference championship. He played in the 1972 and 1974 Sun Bowls, Hula Bowl, and Senior Bowl in 1975.

As a team captain in his senior season, he led an offensive line that produced two 1,000 yard backs and helped Carolina set a school total offense record. He was chosen first-team All-ACC and Consensus All-American in 1974 including Playboy’s Pre-Season All-American pick. Huff was a finalist for the Outland Trophy Award, won the Jacobs Trophy as the league's best blocker, Jim Tatum Medal and was a two time recipient of the Bill Arnold Award as UNC's top lineman.

He was also named Captain of the College All-Stars in their game against the Super Bowl Champion Pittsburgh Steelers, selected to the 75th anniversary All Sun Bowl team in 2008, and listed as one of the top 25 lineman to play in the ACC. His number was retired at his high school alma mater and at UNC where his college jersey is hanging on the University's Honored Jersey section of Kenan Memorial Stadium.

== Professional career ==
Huff was the third overall pick in the 1975 NFL draft by the Baltimore Colts, one pick ahead of Walter Payton. In 1983, he was acquired by the Washington Redskins and became a member of the famed “Hogs” offensive line along with Mark May, Russ Grimm, Joe Jacoby, Jeff Bostic and George Starke. Huff retired in 1986 after 11 years and a career 145 games in the NFL.

== Post-NFL career ==
In May 2008, Huff was inducted into the North Carolina Sports Hall of Fame.

Currently, Huff is the owner of an award-winning, custom home building company in Chapel Hill, North Carolina. He is involved with numerous UNC and NFL related charity organizations as well as doing Public Service Announcements for Hope For The Warriors.

Received the Walter Camp Foundation Alumni of the Year for 2013.

Was UNC's selection to the Legends of the ACC, Class of 2015, joining Ga Tech's head coach Bobby Ross, Miami's Clinton Portis, Pitt's Tony Dorsett, and Clemson's Anthony Simmons to name a few.

Huff is a board member of the National Football Foundation's Bill Dooley Chapter, currently the largest chapter in the country (2015).

Named the 2016 Distinguished American Award by the Bill Dooley Chapter of the National Football Foundation.

Walter Camp Football Foundation Alumni President, 2019–present.

Named number 17 on UNC's top 25 players in football history (2021)
