= Joe Bugel =

American football player and coach (1940–2020)

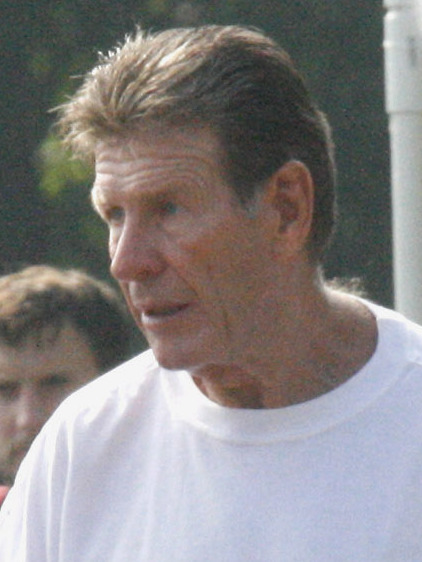
- Bugel in 2008

Profile
- Position: Offensive line coach

Personal information
- Born: March 10, 1940; Pittsburgh, Pennsylvania, U.S.
- Died: June 28, 2020 (aged 80)

Career information
- High school: Munhall (PA)
- College: Western Kentucky

Career history
- Western Kentucky (1964–1968) Defensive line coach; Navy (1969–1972) Defensive line coach; Iowa State (1973) Defensive tackles coach; Ohio State (1974) Interior offensive line coach; Detroit Lions (1975–1976) Offensive line coach; Houston Oilers (1977–1980) Offensive line coach; Washington Redskins (1981–1982) Offensive coordinator & offensive line coach; Washington Redskins (1983–1989) Assistant head & offensive line coach; Phoenix Cardinals (1990–1993) Head coach; Oakland Raiders (1995–1996) Assistant head coach for offense; Oakland Raiders (1997) Head coach; San Diego Chargers (1998–2001) Offensive line coach; Washington Redskins (2004–2009) Offensive line coach

Awards and highlights
- 2× Super Bowl champion (XVII, XXII); 80 Greatest Redskins

Head coaching record
- Regular season: 24–56 (.300)
- Coaching profile at Pro Football Reference

Joseph John Bugel (March 10, 1940 – June 28, 2020) was an American professional football coach in the National Football League (NFL). For many years, he was acknowledged as the greatest offensive line coach in the league, particularly with the Washington Redskins under head coach Joe Gibbs in the 1980s. He was the architect behind "The Hogs", the Redskins' dominant offensive line that helped lead them to three Super Bowl wins.

Bugel played college football for the Western Kentucky Hilltoppers before becoming a college assistant coach. Prior to joining the Redskins, he served as the offensive line coach or assistant for several other teams, including the Detroit Lions, Houston Oilers, and San Diego Chargers. He was also the head coach of the Phoenix Cardinals (1990–1993) and Oakland Raiders (1997), compiling a combined record of 24–56 with them.

== Early life ==
A Pittsburgh native, Bugel was a two-way star in football at Munhall High School. Bugel also played for the Daytona Beach Thunderbirds, a semi-pro team. In 2005, he was inducted into the Pennsylvania Sports Hall of Fame (Western Chapter). While earning his degree in physical education, Bugel was an all-conference guard and linebacker. He earned a master's degree in counseling, also at Western Kentucky.

== Coaching career ==
=== Early career ===
Before joining the NFL, Bugel spent time coaching at Ohio State (1974), Iowa State (1973), Navy (1969–1972) and his alma mater, Western Kentucky (1964–1968). Bugel originally entered the NFL in 1975, spending two seasons as the offensive line coach for the Detroit Lions.

=== Houston Oilers ===
Bugel joined the Houston Oilers in the same capacity in 1977. During his four seasons with the Oilers, the team set records in rushing and passing. His offensive line was also instrumental in the Oilers' 1979 playoff upset over the San Diego Chargers, led by Dan Fouts. Working without Earl Campbell, Bugel's line, led by All-Pro tackle Leon Gray, made one-playoff-game heroes out of the likes of Rob Carpenter, Ronnie Coleman, Gifford Neilsen and Boobie Clark.

=== Washington Redskins ===
In his first stint with the Washington Redskins (1981–1989), he began as the Redskins offensive coordinator in 1981 and was promoted to assistant head coach in 1983. In 1982, he started to develop "The Hogs"—the nickname he penned for his offensive line unit during the Redskins' 1982 training camp. Bugel developed the dominating "Hogs" offensive line that included stalwarts Russ Grimm, Joe Jacoby, Mark May, Jeff Bostic, George Starke and others. Under Bugel's direction, the Redskins scored a then-NFL record 541 points (1983), had four 1,000-yard rushers, one 4,000-yard passer and nine 1,000-yard receivers. Overall, he participated in three Super Bowls, six conference championships and 24 playoff contests. Washington won two of its three Super Bowls (XVII, XXII) while Bugel was on coach Joe Gibbs' staff.

=== Phoenix Cardinals ===
Bugel served as head coach of the Phoenix Cardinals from 1990 to 1993. On February 6, 1990, he was hired as the sixth Cardinals coach in the last eleven years. He was hired over other finalists such as 49ers offensive coordinator Mike Holmgren, Rams defensive coordinator Fritz Shurmur, Fresno State coach Jim Sweeney, Bengals offensive coordinator Bruce Coslet, Giants defensive coordinator Bill Belichick and interim coach Hank Kuhlmann.

With a year on his contract remaining, Bugel was told in the preseason to have a winning season or be fired. The Cardinals won four of their last five games but finished 7–9. On January 24, 1994, he was fired.

=== Oakland Raiders ===
Bugel was considered for the head coaching job of the Oakland Raiders in 1995 before Mike White was hired. Bugel was instead hired to serve as assistant head coach for the 1995 and 1996 seasons before being promoted to head coach for the 1997 season over finalists such as special teams coach Rusty Tillman and Eagles offensive coordinator Jon Gruden.

The Raiders struggled to maintain protection for quarterback Jeff George and sputtered to losing eight of their last nine games to close the season at 4-12, the worst season for the team since 1962. On January 6, 1998, he was fired, making him the shortest tenured head coach of the Raiders since Marty Feldman.

=== San Diego Chargers ===
From 1998 to 2001, Bugel oversaw the offensive line of the San Diego Chargers, after which he had a two-year respite from football.

=== Second stint with the Redskins ===
Bugel returned to the Redskins in 2004 as assistant head coach on offense in Joe Gibbs's return to the team. Bugel's offensive front led the Redskins to consecutive Top 10 finishes in rushing yards per game in the 2005 and 2006 seasons. The Redskins ranked seventh in the NFL and averaged 136.4 yards per game in 2005. The following season (2006), Washington ranked fourth in the NFL with an average of 138.5 yards per contest. Additionally, the Redskins pass protection unit allowed just 19 sacks in 2006, third-lowest in the NFL.

In 2007, Bugel faced his biggest challenge since returning to Washington in 2004. He was without the services of a pair of his starters on the right side and was forced to make a series of adjustments. Right tackle Jon Jansen (ankle surgery) landed on injured reserve after the season opener against the Miami Dolphins and right guard Randy Thomas (triceps injury) missed 14 contests. Bugel's 2007 offensive line featured six different lineups and three different starters at the right tackle position but still led the Redskins to finish fifth in the NFC and 12th in the NFL in rushing yards per game (116.9 yards per game) in 2007. Running back Clinton Portis ranked third in the NFC and sixth in the NFL with 1,262 yards and 11 touchdowns in 2007.

Behind Bugel's offensive lines, Portis established himself as one of the premier backs in football. His 2008 totals: 1,487 yards on 342 carries; move him to sixth among active running backs in career rushing yards. With six 100-yard rushing games in 2008, Portis also took over as the leader in most 100-yard rushing games in Redskins history, with 25.

Additionally, Portis's 2008 campaign made it five straight seasons (2004–08) in which Bugel's lines led a player to eclipse the 1,000-yard rushing mark: Portis, 1,315 in 2004; Portis, 1,513, in 2005; Ladell Betts, 1,154 in 2006; Portis, 1,262 in 2007 and Portis, 1,487 in 2008.

One of Bugel's greatest strengths as an offensive line coach was to fill a void when projected starters sustained injuries, and this skill was on display yet again in 2008. On 2008, despite a rotating cast at the right tackle position and a late-season injury to left tackle Pro Bowler Chris Samuels, the offensive line paved the way for the Redskins running game to rack up 130.9 yards per game, eighth in the NFL. Despite suffering a late-season injury, Samuels continued his stellar career as a member of Bugel's offensive line, earning his sixth Pro Bowl berth in nine active seasons; including four straight during his five seasons under Bugel's tutelage. He retired from the NFL following the end of the 2009 season.

=== Head coaching record ===
Team	Year	Regular season					Postseason			
Team	Year	Won	Lost	Ties	Win %	Finish	Won	Lost	Win %	Result
PHO	1990	5	11	0	.313	5th in NFC East	–	–	–	–
PHO	1991	4	12	0	.313	5th in NFC East	–	–	–	–
PHO	1992	4	12	0	.250	5th in NFC East	–	–	–	–
PHO	1993	7	9	0	.438	4th in NFC East	–	–	–	–
PHO total		20	44	0	.313		–	–	–	–
OAK	1997	4	12	0	.250	4th in AFC West	–	–	–	–
OAK total		4	12	0	.250		–	–	–	–
Total		24	56	0	.300		–	–	–	–

== Personal life ==
Bugel and his wife, Brenda, had three daughters: Angie, Jennifer and Holly. Holly died from bone cancer on August 21, 2008. Joe died at the age of 80 on June 28, 2020.
