= Charley Casserly =

American football executive (born 1949)

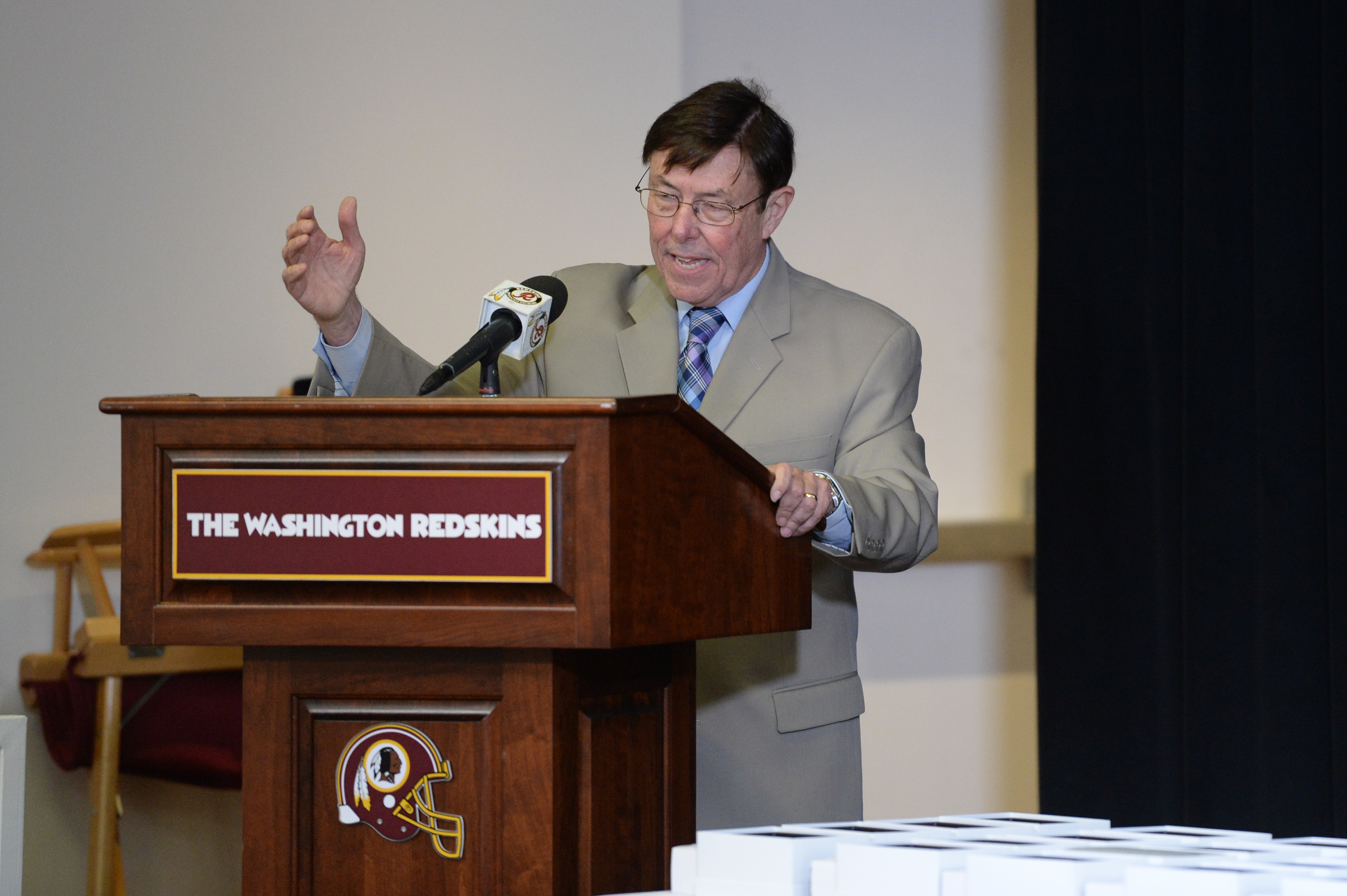
- Casserly in 2018

Personal information
- Born: February 27, 1949 (age 77); River Edge, New Jersey, U.S.

Career information
- High school: Bergen Catholic (Oradell, New Jersey)
- College: Springfield College

Career history
- Washington Redskins (1977) Intern; Washington Redskins (1978–1981) Scout; Washington Redskins (1982–1989) Assistant general manager; Washington Redskins (1989–1999) General manager; Houston Texans (2002–2005) General manager

Awards and highlights
- 3× Super Bowl champion (XVII, XXII, XXVI); Washington DC Sports Hall of Fame (2024)
- Executive profile at Pro Football Reference

Charley Casserly (born February 27, 1949) is an American professional football analyst and former executive. Casserly was the general manager of the National Football League (NFL)'s Washington Redskins and Houston Texans, winning three Super Bowls with Washington.

== Early life ==
Casserly was born in 1949 and grew up in River Edge, New Jersey before attending Bergen Catholic High School. Casserly began his career as an assistant track coach at Cathedral High School in Springfield, Massachusetts, from 1969–72 before moving to a similar post at his alma mater, Springfield (MA) College from 1973–74. He returned to Cathedral High School to serve as the school's athletic director for two years before becoming head football coach at Minnechaug Regional High School in Wilbraham, Massachusetts, from 1975–76. He holds a bachelor's degree in education and a master's degree in guidance from Springfield College, where he also played football. His roommate at Springfield was former New York Giants GM, Dave Gettleman. In May 2005, he received an honorary doctor degree in humanics from Springfield. Casserly is also a member of the Springfield College Sports Hall of Fame and Bergen Catholic High School Hall of Fame.

== Managerial career ==
=== Washington Redskins ===
In his 23-year career with the Washington Redskins, the team went to four Super Bowls, winning three. Casserly was an assistant to general manager Bobby Beathard for two of the Super Bowl winning seasons. In 2003, NFL Commissioner Paul Tagliabue appointed him to the NFL's Competition Committee for the second time (2003–06; 1996–1999).

Casserly started with the Redskins in 1977 as an unpaid intern under Hall of Fame coach, George Allen. Washington hired Casserly as a scout the next season. During his early years as a scout, he unearthed free agents Joe Jacoby and Jeff Bostic, who were original members of the famed "Hogs" offensive line and key components of Washington's first two Super Bowl teams. Jacoby was selected to four Pro Bowls and Bostic made one trip to Honolulu. The Washington Redskins elevated Casserly to assistant general manager in 1982 and the club went on to capture its first Super Bowl. That year, Casserly also re-instituted the club's intern program, which has produced more than 20 league executives over his years in Washington and Houston.

During the NFL players strike in 1987, Casserly put together the Washington Redskins "replacement" team that went 3–0 before the strike ended, including a Monday Night win against a Dallas team that featured a number of its star players. That experience was the subject of the Warner Bros. feature film, "The Replacements," that starred Keanu Reeves and Gene Hackman.

Promoted to general manager after Beathard resigned in 1989, Casserly sustained the Washington Redskin’s history of uncovering high-quality players in the later rounds of the draft. He used a fifth-round draft pick in 1990 to select Southwest Louisiana quarterback Brian Mitchell. Washington Redskins then converted Mitchell into a running back/kick returner, where he later joined Jim Brown as the only players in NFL history to lead the league in combined net yards four times. In 1996, Casserly plucked Auburn University running back Stephen Davis in the fourth round. Davis paced the NFC in rushing in 1999 with 1,450 yards. Casserly also drafted future Pro Bowlers in wide receiver Keenan McCardell (12th round, 1991) and tight end Frank Wycheck (sixth round, 1993). During the 1999 off-season, Casserly acquired veteran quarterback Brad Johnson who responded with a Pro Bowl season.

In 1999, Sports Illustrated, Pro Football Weekly, The Sporting News and USA Today named Casserly their NFL Executive of the Year at mid-season. On draft day in 1999, Casserly acquired all of the New Orleans Saints 1999 selections, plus their first and third-round picks in 2000 by swapping the WFT's fifth selection in the first round for the Saints' 12th choice. He still managed to obtain the player that Washington wanted, selecting future Pro Bowl and Hall of Fame cornerback Champ Bailey. Casserly was fired in July 1999 by new team owner Daniel Snyder.

=== Houston Texans ===
After leaving the Redskins, Casserly took on the general manager role for the expansion Houston Texans. With the franchise's first four selections in the 2002 NFL draft, Casserly drafted David Carr, Jabar Gaffney, Chester Pitts, and Fred Weary.

During Casserly's remaining drafts for the Texans, (2003 through 2006), the Texans drafted five eventual Pro-Bowlers: Andre Johnson (WR, 2003), Jerome Mathis (KR, 2005), DeMeco Ryans (LB, 2006), Mario Williams (DE, 2006) and Owen Daniels (TE 2006). Ryans was also named the NFL Defensive Rookie of the Year in 2006. Mario Williams, who many criticized for being the #1 overall pick in 2006 (behind college standouts Reggie Bush and Vince Young), made the Pro Bowl in the 2008 season.

During Casserly's tenure as GM, the Texans went 4–12 in their inaugural season of 2002, then improved to 5–11 in 2003 and 7–9 in 2004 before slumping to a disappointing 2–14 record in 2005. During the 2005 season, while the Texans were 1–12, team owner Bob McNair hired former NFL coach Dan Reeves to serve as a consultant to help McNair evaluate his team. After the end of the season, head coach Dom Capers was fired by McNair. Casserly was criticized for a number of personnel moves, including trading second and third round picks to the Oakland Raiders for Phillip Buchanon in 2005. Buchanon was a poor player for the Texans in 2005, and was released by the team after the first four games of the 2006 season. In a public interview, McNair criticized the trade for Buchanon, saying that the front office had not done its homework.

Subsequent to the Texans' 2006 NFL Draft and after the Texans' 2–14 season, Casserly left the organization on June 1, 2006. Casserly sought a job in the National Football League front office, but was passed over for the job. He was succeeded as general manager by Rick Smith. Casserly's work with the Texans was subjected to much criticism.

=== Broadcast career ===
In addition, Casserly has had extensive experience in radio and television for 16 years. While in Washington, he was a part of local television shows on WUSA (CBS), WJLA (ABC), WTTG (Fox) and HTS (Home Team Sports), as well as radio shows on WTOP and WJFK. In Houston, Casserly did four years of television on KTRK (ABC) and six years of radio on KILT. In the Fall of 1999, he reported three times per week on ESPN Radio and was a contributor on Edge NFL Match-Up. In 2008, Casserly was the color commentator for the Philadelphia Eagles preseason games on Eagles Television Network. He has also served as an NFL insider as part of The NFL Today on CBS. He was inducted in the Washington DC Sports Hall of Fame in 2024.

=== Other work ===
Casserly is also employed by George Mason University as an executive-in-residence and instructor of sport management. He also teaches an MBA course at Georgetown University.
