= The Hogs (American football) =

1980s Washington Redskins offensive line group

Name	Washington seasons	Washington's Super Bowl wins
Jeff Bostic	1980–1993	XVII, XXII, XXVI
Ray Brown	1989–1995	XXVI
Fred Dean	1978–1982	XVII
Russ Grimm	1981–1991	XVII, XXII, XXVI
Joe Jacoby	1981–1993	XVII, XXII, XXVI
Jim Lachey	1988–1995	XXVI
Mark May	1981–1990	XVII, XXII
Raleigh McKenzie	1985–1994	XXII, XXVI
Mark Schlereth	1989–1994	XXVI
Ed Simmons	1987–1997	XXII, XXVI
George Starke	1972–1984	XVII
Rick Walker	1980–1984	XVII
Don Warren	1979–1992	XVII, XXII, XXVI

Highlighted names denote members of the Pro Football Hall of Fame.

The Hogs was a nickname given to the offensive line of the Washington Redskins (now known as the Washington Commanders) of the National Football League during the 1980s and early 1990s. Renowned for their ability to control the line of scrimmage, the Hogs helped the Redskins win three Super Bowl championships (XVII, XXII and XXVI) under head coach Joe Gibbs. The Washington Commanders pay homage to the Hogs with their mascot, Major Tuddy.

== History ==
"The Hogs" was a term coined by offensive line coach Joe Bugel during training camp in 1982, when he told Russ Grimm and Jeff Bostic, "Okay, you hogs, let's get running down there." Center Jeff Bostic, left guard Russ Grimm, right guard Mark May, left tackle Joe Jacoby, right tackle George Starke, guard Fred Dean, along with tight ends Don Warren and Rick Walker composed the original Hogs. While Starke retired in 1984 shortly after the team won their third NFL Championship and first Super Bowl in Super Bowl XVII, Bostic, Grimm, Jacoby, and Warren stayed together until the early 1990s and were on all three Redskins Super Bowl winning teams under Gibbs.

The line averaged 273 pounds in 1982 with Jacoby weighing in at around 300 pounds. Early on, the Hogs provided cover for running back John Riggins and quarterback Joe Theismann. Riggins was accepted as an "Honorary Hog." Quarterback Theismann threw a key block one day and begged to be named an "honorary piglet." Theismann never had to hit a blocking dummy every day, which is why he never made "piglet." Besides, Bugel said: "We don't want a quarterback in the gang." "No quarterbacks," Starke said at the time. Theismann has said on numerous occasions that after that block he did make it into "The Hogs" as a "Piglet."

Their successes inspired a group of male fans who came to be known as the "Hogettes", who attended games dressed in "old lady" drag (dresses, wide-brimmed hats) and wearing plastic pig snouts. The Hogettes cheered on the Redskins for 30 years before announcing their retirement in 2013.

Soon after losing Super Bowl XVIII 38–9 to the Los Angeles Raiders in 1984, Starke retired. Theismann's career ended in 1985, after he suffered an injury while being tackled by New York Giants linebacker Lawrence Taylor. Riggins retired after the 1985 season. Shortly after, the Redskins were joined by a new class of Hogs, including 1985 draft pick Raleigh McKenzie, a left guard from the University of Tennessee, and 1989 draft pick Mark Schlereth, a right guard from the University of Idaho, along with Ray Brown, Ed Simmons, and Pro Bowl left tackle Jim Lachey, who was acquired in a trade with the Los Angeles Raiders. With their help, Washington won two more Super Bowls - XXII in 1988 and XXVI in 1992. Grimm was inducted into the Pro Football Hall of Fame in 2010.

== See also ==
- List of NFL nicknames
