= Major Tuddy =

Washington Commanders mascot

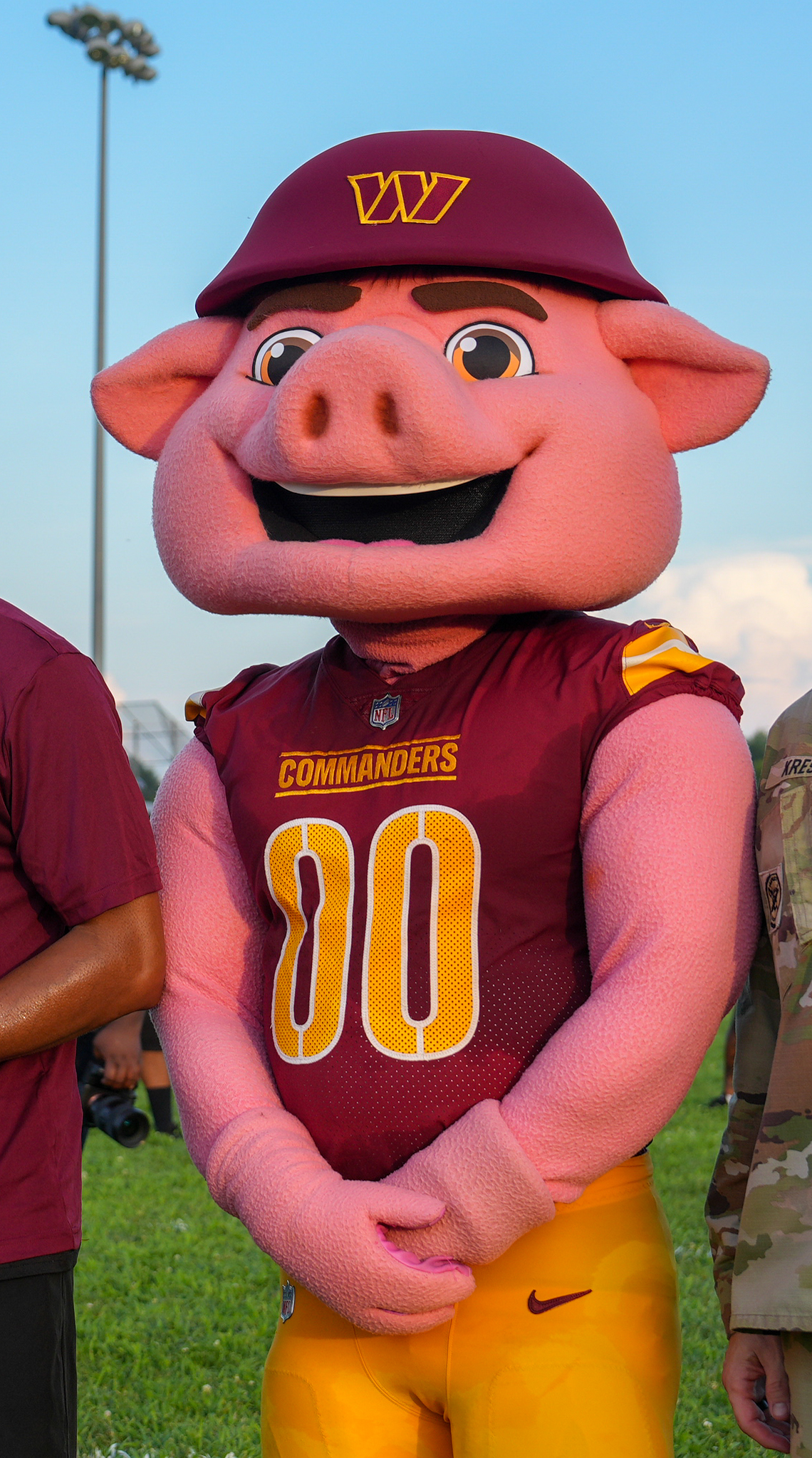
- Major Tuddy in 2025
- Team: Washington Commanders
- Description: Major-ranked pig
- First seen: January 1, 2023
- Website: www.commanders.com/fans/mascot/

Major Tuddy is the mascot of the Washington Commanders of the National Football League (NFL). He is a large anthropomorphic pig who wears a combat helmet and team uniform. Introduced during the team's rebrand in 2022, he is an homage to the Hogs, Washington's famed offensive line in the 1980s. "Tuddy" is a slang term derived from the abbreviation of a touchdown (TD).

== Career ==
Major Tuddy was introduced on January 1, 2023. He is a homage to the Hogs, Washington's famed offensive line in the 1980s. "Tuddy" is a slang term derived from the abbreviation of a touchdown (TD).
