= Darryl Grant =

American football player (born 1959)

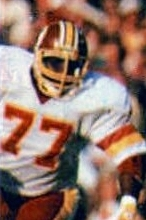
- Grant playing for the Redskins in Super Bowl XVII

No. 77, 97
- Position: Defensive tackle

Personal information
- Born: November 22, 1959 (age 66); San Antonio, Texas, U.S.
- Listed height: 6 ft 1 in (1.85 m)
- Listed weight: 265 lb (120 kg)

Career information
- High school: Highlands (San Antonio)
- College: Rice
- NFL draft: 1981: 9th round, 231st overall pick

Career history
- Washington Redskins (1981–1990); San Diego Chargers (1991)*; Tampa Bay Buccaneers (1991); Kansas City Chiefs (1992)*
- * Offseason or practice squad member only

Awards and highlights
- 2× Super Bowl champion (XVII, XXII); Washington Commanders 90 Greatest

Career NFL statistics
- Sacks: 27
- Interceptions: 2
- Touchdowns: 1
- Stats at Pro Football Reference

Darryl Baris Grant (born November 22, 1959) is an American former professional football player who was a defensive tackle for 11 seasons in the National Football League (NFL), primarily with the Washington Redskins. He played college football for the Rice Owls.

Grant was selected by the Redskins in the ninth round of the 1981 NFL draft. The Redskins decided to turn him into a defensive lineman, even though he played offensive guard in college. After using his 1981 rookie year to adjust to the rigors of playing defensive tackle in the NFL, Grant joined the defensive line rotation starting in 1982.

Grant went on to become a fixture on head coach Joe Gibbs' Redskins teams in the 1980s. At times paired alongside other Redskins defensive line standouts such as Dave Butz, Dexter Manley and Charles Mann, Grant was one of the contributors during a period (his Redskins career 1981–1990) that saw the Redskins make the playoffs six times, including three trips to the Super Bowl (two wins) and four conference championship appearances (three wins).

== Career highlights ==
Grant intercepted a pass and returned it for a ten-yard touchdown in the 1982 NFC Championship game against the Dallas Cowboys, which the Redskins eventually won 31–17.

Grant went on to play in 141 games for the Redskins from 1981 to 1990, finishing with 27 sacks and two interceptions. His best season was 1984 when he recorded a career-high eight sacks.
