= George Starke =

American football player (born 1948)

No. 74
- Position: Offensive tackle

Personal information
- Born: July 18, 1948 (age 78); New York, New York, U.S.
- Listed height: 6 ft 5 in (1.96 m)
- Listed weight: 260 lb (118 kg)

Career information
- High school: New Rochelle (New Rochelle, New York)
- College: Columbia
- NFL draft: 1971: 11th round, 272nd overall pick

Career history
- Washington Redskins (1973–1984)

Awards and highlights
- Super Bowl champion (XVII); 70 Greatest Redskins

Career NFL statistics
- Games played: 156
- Games started: 147
- Fumble recoveries: 5
- Stats at Pro Football Reference

George Lawrence Starke (born July 18, 1948) is an American business owner, activist, broadcaster and former professional football player who was an offensive tackle for the Washington Redskins of the National Football League (NFL) from 1973 to 1984.

He played college football for the Columbia Lions and was selected by the Washington Redskins in the 11th round of the 1971 NFL draft. He appeared with the Redskins in two Super Bowls (1982 and 1983), helping them win Super Bowl XVII.

Starke's professional football career lasted 13 years and, at the time of his retirement, Starke had been captain of the Redskins for five years. He was named one of the 70 greatest players in Redskins history.

The 6'5", 255-pound Starke was known by many as the "Head Hog" of "The Hogs," the Redskins' famous offensive line which also included Russ Grimm, Don Warren, Rick Walker, Mark May, Joe Jacoby and Jeff Bostic. The Hogs stayed together with a few other later additions nearly a decade after Starke's retirement in 1984.

Following his retirement from professional football, Starke attended Ford Motors Dealer Operations School and opened "George Starke Ford" in Emmitsburg, Maryland. At the same time, he launched a career in television broadcasting.

In 1997, Starke founded the "Excel Institute" in Washington, D.C., a not-for profit adult education vocational training school for at risk individuals above the age of 16. After graduating over 500 students trained as auto technicians, Starke retired from the Institute on October 1, 2010.

Starke's other endeavors include "Head Hog BBQ" restaurants in Bethesda, Maryland and Rockville, Maryland named after the famous Washington Redskins offensive line of which he was the senior member.

Following his retirement from the institute, Starke started Starke Communications, a communications firm that provides communications, public relations and marketing services to corporate clients.

== Early life ==
Starke grew up in New Rochelle, New York and attended public schools there. His father, George Starke Sr., was a high school principal in Yonkers, New York and his mother, Shirley Starke, was a registered nurse. He has Mohawk ancestry on his mother's side.

Upon graduation from New Rochelle High School, Starke received a series of football awards, including All-Westchester County, All-Metropolitan, All-State and All-American. He was inducted into the New Rochelle and Westchester County Halls of Fame.

== College career ==
Starke decided to attend Columbia College after having traveled much of the United States on a college tour that was sponsored by the many institutions offering him admission and full scholarships. The last college he visited prior to accepting Columbia College was Notre Dame. Had he gone there, he would have teamed with Notre Dame's quarterback Joe Theisman who later teamed with Starke in the Super Bowl victory over the Miami Dolphins.

One last attempt to sidetrack Starke's Columbia decision was made by the University of Virginia, which offered him the opportunity to not only attend their school on full scholarship, but also be the person to desegregate their college. Starke declined this offer.

While at Columbia College in New York City, Starke led his college football team in receptions as a tight end in 1969. At Columbia, Starke majored in physics and, in addition to football, also played center on a Columbia basketball team that featured All-Americans Jim McMillan and Haywood Dotsun. That Columbia basketball team would rise in the collegiate national basketball rankings to number 2 in the United States, just below UCLA. In 1983, Starke received Columbia's highest graduate award, the "John Jay Award" for prestigious graduate achievement.

== Professional career ==
In spite of being drafted by the Redskins, Starke's pro football career had a rough start. Two weeks into Redskins training camp in Carlisle, Pennsylvania, Starke was cut by the Redskins and went to Kansas City, Missouri to try out for the Kansas City Chiefs. After spending the remainder of the training camp with the Chiefs and being told he would make the squad, Starke was the last player cut by head coach Hank Stram just before the season began. In July 1972, Starke journeyed to Thousand Oaks, California to try out for the Dallas Cowboys. The Cowboys trained in the hills 40 miles north of Los Angeles to escape the heat of suburban Dallas, Texas. After six weeks of training camp with the Cowboys, Starke was cut but then the Redskins asked him to return and try again.

One year later and one year wiser, Starke made the Redskins roster. Placed originally on the taxi squad, Starke eventually moved up to the regular roster and by mid 1973 the starting position as right tackle. Initially, Starke played on coach George Allen's "Over the Hill Gang" and by 1979 under coach Jack Pardee, he was named offensive captain of the team. In 1981 under new coach Joe Gibbs, a young group of offensive linemen developed. This group, which became known as "The Hogs" later went on to become the most famous offensive group of linemen to ever play in the National Football League. Regardless of the fact that he was ten years older than the rest, Starke became their leader and as such he became known as the "Head Hog".

Starke's first Super Bowl was with the "Over the Hill Gang" in 1972. Later with the "Hogs", Starke returned for Super Bowl XVII and Super Bowl XVIII after the 1982 NFL season and 1983 NFL season winning the first against the Miami Dolphins and losing the second against the Oakland Raiders. Starke's last full football season was 1984. He retired during training camp in 1985.

== Life with the Hogs ==
Prior to retiring during the years 1983 and 1984, Starke capitalized on the notoriety of the "Hogs" by bringing them together getting each of them to invest $500.00 and forming a corporation called "Super Hogs." "Super Hogs" became the first professional athletes of any sport to market themselves outside of the National Football League oversight. "Super Hogs" created a clothing line, beer company, sold various "Hogs" themes merchandise and produced the two most successful football posters of all times: (1) Hogs Night Out and (2) The Grave Yard Dogs.

== Life after the Skins ==
After retiring from the Washington Redskins in September 1985, Starke began working simultaneously on two careers. He was accepted into Ford Motor Companies Dealer Operations Training School in Baltimore, Maryland. Two years later, he graduated and along with a partner opened "George Starke Ford" in Emmitsburg, Maryland.

At the same time, Starke began his career in television broadcasting building on his many TV appearances in conjunction with local sports personalities who interviewed him as captain of the Washington Redskins. After his retirement from pro football, Starke hosted PM Magazine and co-hosted the show Redskins Saturday Night with Pete Wysocki. In addition, Starke began working as a host for Hometeam Sports (Comcast) and a color commentator for ESPN College Football and CBS National Football League broadcasts co-hosted with James Brown.

The "Redskins Saturday Night" shows went on to win several local Emmys. In 1989, Starke founded a beer company called "Head Hog Premium Beer" that sold beer within the historic Redskins broadcast footprint, which extended from Delaware in the north to Georgia in the south. That company evolved into "Head Hog BBQ Restaurants" in Bethesda, Maryland and Rockville, Maryland.

In 1996, being alarmed by the spike in youth violence in the District of Columbia and determining that violence was primarily a job issue, that involved a large number of youth who were illiterate and therefore unemployable, rather than a crime issue, Starke founded a not-for profit job training facility he named the Excel Institute. The institute was designed as a two-year adult education program for at risk youth above the age of 16 that provides basic education, life skills counseling and autotech vocational training. Two basic tenets of the Institute were that (1) anyone above the age of sixteen who wanted to attend was admitted and (2) all students were on full scholarship - i.e., nobody had to pay. In October 2010, after graduating over 500 students, Starke retired from management and the Board of the Excel Institute.

After retirement from the institute, Starke founded Starke Communications, a communications firm that provides communications, public relations and marketing services to corporate clients. Starke Communications also provides motivational speakers for its clients.

== Personal life ==
George Starke lives with his wife Petra Smeltzer Starke in Beverly Hills, California. Petra Starke, who grew up in Prague as Czech national, graduated from Georgetown University Law Center cum laude and used to practice law in Washington, D.C., including in the Obama White House. She founded a chain of yoga studios. They share their residence with son, George Lawrence Starke, IV and the family dog, Coconut.
