= Don Warren =

American football player and scout (born 1956)

No. 85
- Position: Tight end

Personal information
- Born: May 5, 1956 (age 70); Bellingham, Washington, U.S.
- Listed height: 6 ft 4 in (1.93 m)
- Listed weight: 242 lb (110 kg)

Career information
- High school: Royal Oak (Covina, California)
- College: San Diego State
- NFL draft: 1979: 4th round, 103rd overall pick

Career history

Playing
- Washington Redskins (1979–1992)

Operations
- Washington Redskins (2005–2009) Pro scout; Carolina Panthers (2010–2019) Pro scout; Washington Football Team (2020–2021) Senior pro scout

Awards and highlights
- 3× Super Bowl champion (XVII, XXII, XXVI); 80 Greatest Redskins

Career NFL statistics
- Receptions: 244
- Receiving yards: 2,536
- Receiving touchdowns: 7
- Stats at Pro Football Reference

Donald James Warren (born May 5, 1956) is an American former professional football player and scout in the National Football League (NFL). He played as a tight end for his entire 14-year playing career with the Washington Redskins, winning three Super Bowls.

Warren played college football for the San Diego State Aztecs. He was selected by Washington in the fourth round of the 1979 NFL draft and retired from playing following the 1992 season. After initially spending time working at Centreville High School as an assistant football and baseball coach, he later returned to the Redskins as a pro scout under former head coach Joe Gibbs. He later served as a pro scout for the Carolina Panthers from 2010 to 2019 before following head coach Ron Rivera back to Washington, spending the 2020–2021 seasons as a senior pro scout for the Washington Commanders before retiring from scouting.

== High school and college career ==
Warren was born in Bellingham, Washington and raised in California. He attended and played high school football at Royal Oak High School in Covina, California. Warren attended and played college football first at Mt. San Antonio College, and later transferred to San Diego State University. He played in the East–West Shrine Game after the 1978 season.

== Professional career ==
While with the Redskins, Warren was a member of three Super Bowl-winning teams, following the 1982, 1987, and 1991 seasons; additionally he was a member of the team that went to and did not win the Super Bowl following the 1983 season, a team which offensively set the record for number of points scored in one season, a record which remained for 15 years. Known as an excellent blocker, Warren was an original member of "The Hogs", a nickname given to the Redskins offensive line in the 1980s.

After retiring following the 1992 season, Warren spent several years as baseball and football coach for Centreville High School in Virginia. In 2005, he rejoined the Redskins as a scout before joining the Carolina Panthers in 2010, serving as a scout for them until 2019. He rejoined Washington, known at the time as the Washington Football Team, as a senior pro scout in 2020. Warren announced his retirement from scouting in June 2022.

== NFL career statistics ==
Legend
| | Won the Super Bowl |
| **Bold** | Career high |

=== Regular season ===
| Year | Team | Games | | Receiving | | | | |
| Year | Team | GP | GS | Rec | Yds | Avg | Lng | TD |
|---|---|---|---|---|---|---|---|---|
| 1979 | WAS | **16** | 10 | 26 | 303 | **11.7** | 23 | 0 |
| 1980 | WAS | 13 | 12 | **31** | 323 | 10.4 | **35** | 0 |
| 1981 | WAS | **16** | **16** | 29 | **335** | 11.6 | 32 | 1 |
| 1982 | WAS | 9 | 9 | 27 | 310 | 11.5 | 29 | 0 |
| 1983 | WAS | 13 | 13 | 20 | 225 | 11.3 | 33 | **2** |
| 1984 | WAS | **16** | **16** | 18 | 192 | 10.7 | 26 | 0 |
| 1985 | WAS | **16** | **16** | 15 | 163 | 10.9 | 19 | 1 |
| 1986 | WAS | **16** | **16** | 20 | 164 | 8.2 | 20 | 1 |
| 1987 | WAS | 12 | 12 | 7 | 43 | 6.1 | 9 | 0 |
| 1988 | WAS | 14 | 14 | 12 | 112 | 9.3 | 32 | 0 |
| 1989 | WAS | 15 | 15 | 15 | 167 | 11.1 | 25 | 1 |
| 1990 | WAS | **16** | 15 | 15 | 123 | 8.2 | 18 | 1 |
| 1991 | WAS | 10 | 7 | 5 | 51 | 10.2 | 17 | 0 |
| 1992 | WAS | 11 | 10 | 4 | 25 | 6.3 | 11 | 0 |
| | | 193 | 181 | 244 | 2,536 | 10.4 | 35 | 7 |

=== Playoffs ===
| Year | Team | Games | | Receiving | | | | |
| Year | Team | GP | GS | Rec | Yds | Avg | Lng | TD |
|---|---|---|---|---|---|---|---|---|
| 1982 | WAS | **4** | **4** | **11** | **72** | 6.5 | 15 | **1** |
| 1983 | WAS | 3 | 3 | 3 | 23 | 7.7 | 12 | 0 |
| 1984 | WAS | 1 | 1 | 1 | 11 | **11.0** | 11 | 0 |
| 1986 | WAS | 3 | 3 | 5 | 21 | 4.2 | 10 | 0 |
| 1987 | WAS | 3 | 3 | 4 | 37 | 9.3 | **16** | 0 |
| 1990 | WAS | 2 | 2 | 1 | 11 | **11.0** | 11 | 0 |
| 1991 | WAS | 3 | 3 | 0 | 0 | 0.0 | 0 | 0 |
| | | 19 | 19 | 25 | 175 | 7.0 | 16 | 1 |
