= Jeff Bostic =

American football player (born 1958)

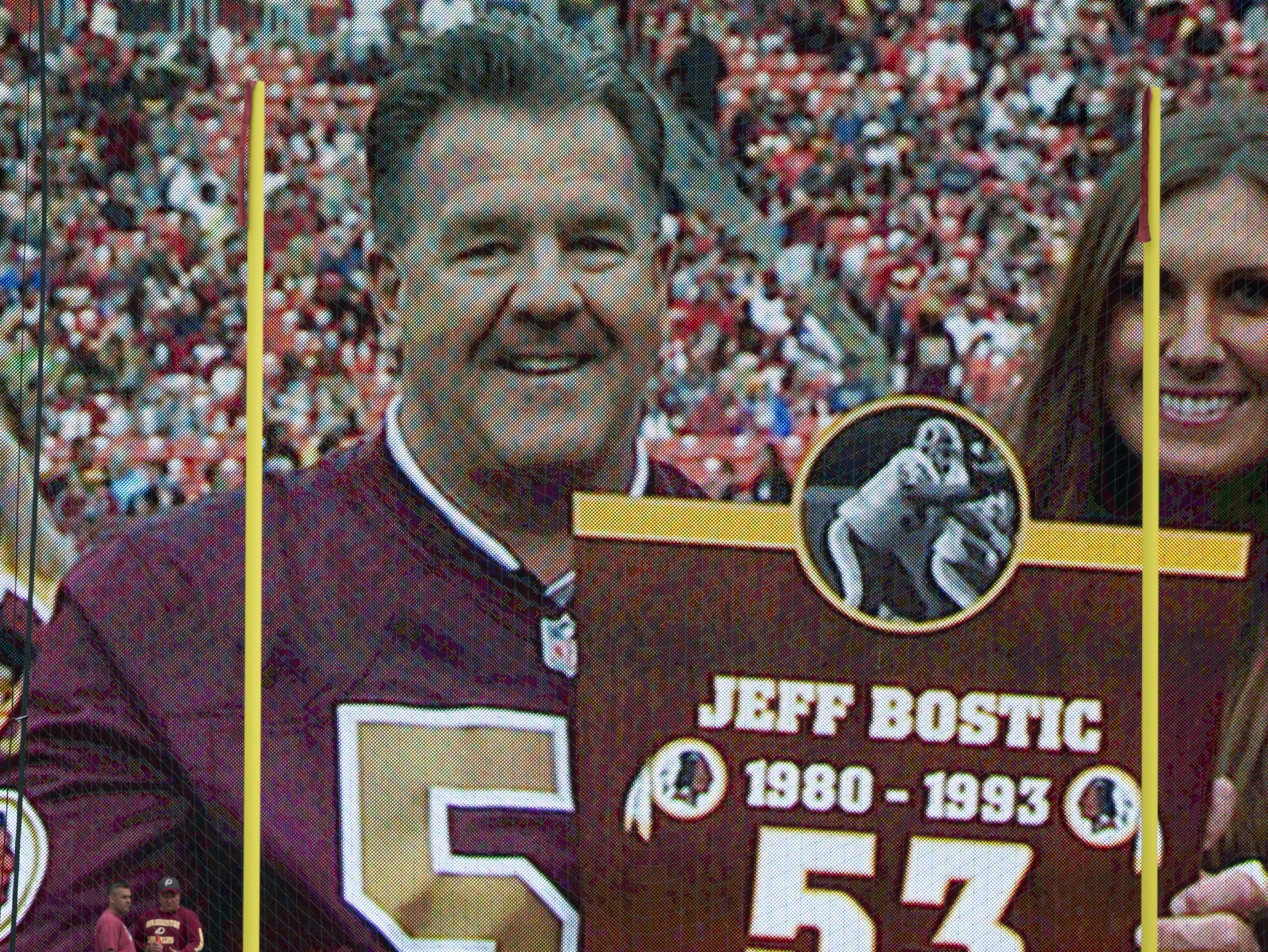
- Bostic in 2015

No. 53
- Position: Center

Personal information
- Born: September 18, 1958 (age 68); Greensboro, North Carolina, U.S.
- Listed height: 6 ft 2 in (1.88 m)
- Listed weight: 268 lb (122 kg)

Career information
- High school: Ben L. Smith (Greensboro)
- College: Clemson
- NFL draft: 1980: undrafted

Career history
- Philadelphia Eagles (1980)*; Washington Redskins (1980–1993)
- * Offseason or practice squad member only

Awards and highlights
- 3× Super Bowl champion (XVII, XXII, XXVI); Pro Bowl (1983); 80 Greatest Redskins; Washington Commanders Ring of Fame; 2× First-team All-ACC (1978, 1979)

Career NFL statistics
- Games played: 184
- Games started: 149
- Fumble recoveries: 9
- Stats at Pro Football Reference

Jeffrey Lynn Bostic (born September 18, 1958) is an American former professional football player who was a center for the Washington Redskins of the National Football League (NFL). He played college football for the Clemson Tigers. Named to the Pro Bowl in 1983, Bostic won three Super Bowls with the Redskins.

== Early life and college career ==
Bostic played football, baseball, and wrestled at Ben L. Smith High School in Greensboro, North Carolina. He played college football at Clemson University. Bostic was a 1980 graduate of Clemson. He was named first-team All-ACC in 1978 and 1979 as an offensive lineman. He was also named to Clemson's All-Centennial Team in 1996, and inducted into the school's Athletic Hall of Fame in 1997. In 1999, he was inducted into the South Carolina Athletic Hall of Fame. Bostic has won more Super Bowl championships (3) than any other former Clemson Tiger.

== Professional career ==
Bostic was a member of the Washington Redskins from 1980 to 1993, helping them win Super Bowls XVII, XXII and XXVI and becoming the only Clemson player to play for three Super Bowl Championship teams. He was also named one of the 70 greatest players in Redskins history. Bostic was one of "The Hogs", the Redskins' famed offensive line which also included guards Russ Grimm and Mark May, tackles Joe Jacoby and George Starke, and a few other new additions over the years.

In 1981, in his second year, he replaced Bob Kuziel as the starting center for the Redskins in all 16 games. He continued in that position until his final year, 1993, though missing an important number of games because of injuries in 1984, 1985, 1987, and 1992.

In 1982, the strike-shortened season at nine regular season games, the offensive line was potent throughout their 8-1 won-lost regular season, with Bostic at center, guards Russ Grimm and Mark May, and tackles Joe Jacoby and George Starke starting all nine games. The same line prevailed in the playoffs, except that Fred Dean replaced May at right guard because of an injury in games 1,2, and 4. The team defeated in succession in the 1982–83 NFL playoffs the Detroit Lions, the Minnesota Vikings, the Dallas Cowboys, and the Miami Dolphins, rushing respectively for 175, 204, 137, and 276 yards, with mainly John Riggins as the running back. The Redskins won Super Bowl XVII with Bostic and the interior line bowling over nose tackle Bob Baumhower and the two interior linebackers A. J. Duhe and Earnie Rhone.

In 1983, Washington won the eastern division of the NFC with a 14-2 won-lost record, thanks to the same offensive line, leading the NFL with 541 points scored (33.8 points/game). They beat the Los Angeles Rams in the divisional round of the 1983–84 NFL playoffs and the San Francisco 49ers in the NFC championship game, passing for more yards than the previous year, but also with some more hefty running: 130 and 172 rushing yards, respectively, but they could not push off so easily the defensive line of the Los Angeles Raiders, losing Super Bowl XVIII. Although they won the eastern division of the NFC again in 1984, they lost the divisional round of the 1984–85 NFL playoffs to the Chicago Bears. The Redskins became a force again in 1986 with a 12–4 record, winning a wild card game against the Los Angeles Rams and the divisional round of the 1986–87 NFL playoffs against the Chicago Bears with 138 and 134 rushing yards, respectively, but could neither pass (150 yards) nor run (40 yards) much against the New York Giants powerful defense, losing the NFC title game.

The 1987 NFL season was another strike year and another Super Bowl win for the Redskins, with 15 games played instead of 16 and owners sending in replacement players. Bostic started only 5 games during the regular season. However, with guards Raleigh McKenzie (replacing the injured Russ Grimm) and R.C. Thielemann and with tackles Joe Jacoby and Mark May, he started every game of the 1987–88 NFL playoffs, where the Redskins had a modest 72 yards on the ground against the Chicago Bears in the divisional round, but demolished the Minnesota Vikings in the NFC title game and the Denver Broncos in Super Bowl XXII with 161 and a 280 yards on the ground, respectively. In the Super Bowl, Greg Kragen at nose tackle with Karl Mecklenburg and Ricky Hunley at interior linebackers could not match up, and especially could not handle the Redskins' counter trey misdirection, where the left side of the line pulled on the opposite side.

Washington returned to the playoffs in the 1990 season (1990–91 NFL playoffs). With an offensive line composed of Bostic, Raleigh McKenzie (replacing the injured Russ Grimm again) and Mark Schlereth at guards, Jim Lachey and Joe Jacoby at tackles, the Redskins beat the Philadelphia Eagles in a wild card game, with 93 rushing yards, but could not get by Joe Montana and the San Francisco 49ers in the divisional round, gaining only 80 rushing yards, as the Redskins had to pass to try to catch up to the 49ers' potent offense. In the 1991 regular season, with Bostic starting all 16 games, Washington finished with a record of 14–2, leading the NFL with 485 points (30.3 points/game). In the 1991–92 NFL playoffs, with the same offensive line as the previous year, Washington beat successively the Atlanta Falcons, Detroit Lions, and Buffalo Bills with 162, 117, and 125 rushing yards, respectively, triumphant in Super Bowl XXVI, Bostic's last playoff game. The following year, Bostic, due to an injury, played in only 4 of 16 regular season games and was replaced by Raleigh McKenzie in the 1992–93 NFL playoffs, the Redskins beating the Minnesota Vikings with 196 rushing yards, but losing, as they did in 1990, to the San Francisco 49ers. In 1993, his last, Bostic played in only 10 games, as the Redskins finished with a 4–12 record. He was replaced as the starting center in 1994 by John Gesek. On October 25, 2015, Bostic was inducted into the Washington Redskins Ring of Fame at half time of the game versus Tampa Bay, which the team would win 31–30.

== Personal life ==
He is the younger brother of former St. Louis Cardinals guard Joe Bostic. He is married to Lynn and had three daughters Ashley, Amanda and Alicia.

== Broadcasting ==
Bostic also worked for the NFL on Westwood One Sports as an analyst and sideline reporter.
