= Dexter Manley =

American football player (born 1959)

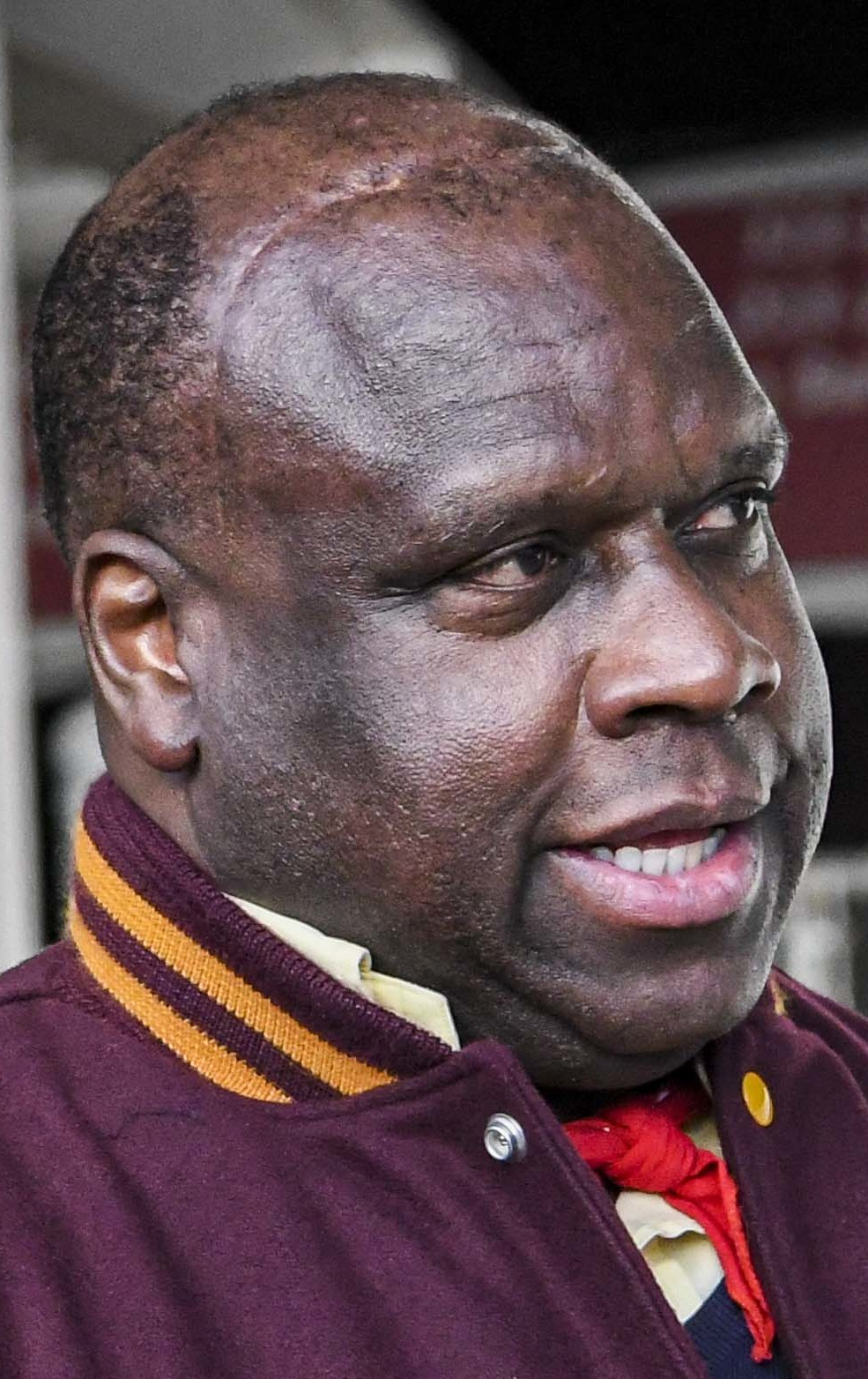
- Manley in 2022

No. 72, 92
- Position: Defensive end

Personal information
- Born: February 2, 1959 (age 67); Houston, Texas, U.S.
- Listed height: 6 ft 3 in (1.91 m)
- Listed weight: 253 lb (115 kg)

Career information
- High school: Yates (Houston)
- College: Oklahoma State
- NFL draft: 1981: 5th round, 119th overall pick

Career history
- Washington Redskins (1981–1989); Phoenix Cardinals (1990); Tampa Bay Buccaneers (1991); Ottawa Rough Riders (1992–1993); Shreveport Pirates (1994)

Awards and highlights
- 2× Super Bowl champion (XVII, XXII); First-team All-Pro (1986); Second-team All-Pro (1987); Pro Bowl (1986); Washington Commanders 90 Greatest; Washington Commanders Ring of Fame

Career NFL statistics
- Sacks: 97.5
- Interceptions: 2
- Touchdowns: 1
- Stats at Pro Football Reference

Dexter Keith Manley (born February 2, 1959) is an American former professional football player who was a defensive end in the National Football League (NFL), primarily with the Washington Redskins. He also played for the Phoenix Cardinals and Tampa Bay Buccaneers, as well as in the Canadian Football League (CFL) for the Ottawa Rough Riders. Manley played college football for the Oklahoma State Cowboys and was selected by the Redskins in the fifth round of the 1981 NFL draft.

== Professional football career ==
=== National Football League ===
Manley was selected in the fifth round (119th overall) of the 1981 NFL draft by the Washington Redskins, where he played for nine seasons. During his career with the Redskins, Manley won two Super Bowl titles and was a Pro Bowler in 1986 when he recorded a Redskins single-season record of 18.5 sacks.

In 1989, Manley failed his third drug test, with an opportunity to apply for reinstatement after one year. He then played for the Phoenix Cardinals and Tampa Bay Buccaneers. However, after he failed his fourth drug test, he retired on December 12, 1991. He had a series of arrests related to his drug problem and was ultimately convicted and served two years in prison.

Officially, Manley had 97.5 quarterback sacks in his career. His total rises to 103.5 when the six sacks he had his rookie year of 1981, when sacks were not yet an official statistic, are included. After his career in the NFL ended, he revealed that he was functionally illiterate, despite having studied at Oklahoma State University for four years.

=== Canadian Football League ===
Manley also played two seasons in the CFL with the Ottawa Rough Riders (1992 and 1993).

== Personal life ==
He was nicknamed the "Secretary of Defense" during his time with the Redskins. He resides in suburban Washington with his family.

Manley underwent brain surgery in June 2006 to treat a colloid cyst. He first learned about the cyst in 1986 after he collapsed in a Georgetown, Washington, D.C. department store. His prognosis was for a relatively full recovery, although doctors have said that memory loss is a common side effect of the operation.

In May 2020, it was announced that Manley had tested positive for COVID-19.

For many years, which included his college football days and the first few years of his pro career, Manley was functionally illiterate. The sight of his teammate Joe Theismann breaking his leg during a game versus the New York Giants on November 18, 1985 shook Manley, who at the time also had an addiction to cocaine. In the months after the season ended in early 1986, Manley went to rehab and took reading classes at the Lab School of Washington; he studied for five years at the school and took classes even after leaving Washington. As of 2015, Manley was clean from drugs for nine years.
