= Russ Grimm =

American football player and coach (born 1959)

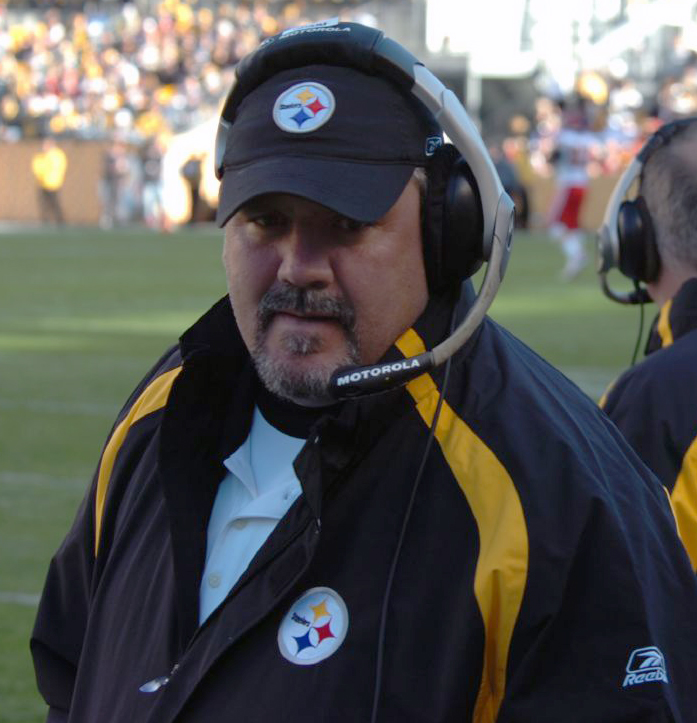
- Grimm with the Pittsburgh Steelers in 2006

No. 68
- Position: Guard

Personal information
- Born: May 2, 1959 (age 67); Scottdale, Pennsylvania, U.S.
- Listed height: 6 ft 3 in (1.91 m)
- Listed weight: 273 lb (124 kg)

Career information
- High school: Southmoreland (PA)
- College: Pittsburgh
- NFL draft: 1981: 3rd round, 69th overall pick

Career history

Playing
- Washington Redskins (1981–1991)

Coaching
- Washington Redskins (1992–1996) Tight ends coach; Washington Redskins (1997–2000) Offensive line coach; Pittsburgh Steelers (2001–2006) Offensive line coach; Arizona Cardinals (2007–2012) Assistant head coach/offensive line coach; Tennessee Titans (2016–2017) Offensive line coach

Awards and highlights
- As player: 3× Super Bowl champion (XVII, XXII, XXVI); 4× First-team All-Pro (1983–1986); 4× Pro Bowl (1983–1986); NFL 1980s All-Decade Team; 80 Greatest Redskins; Second-team All-East (1980); As coach: Super Bowl champion (XL)

Career NFL statistics
- Games played: 140
- Games started: 114
- Fumble recoveries: 7
- Stats at Pro Football Reference
- Pro Football Hall of Fame

Russell Scott Grimm (born May 2, 1959) is an American former professional football player who was a guard for the Washington Redskins of the National Football League (NFL). He has also served as an assistant coach for the Redskins, Pittsburgh Steelers, Arizona Cardinals, and Tennessee Titans. As a professional, Grimm had multiple selections to both the All-Pro and Pro Bowl teams, and was inducted into the Pro Football Hall of Fame in 2010. Grimm played 11 seasons for the Redskins and was a first-team selection to the NFL 1980s All-Decade Team.

== Early life and college ==
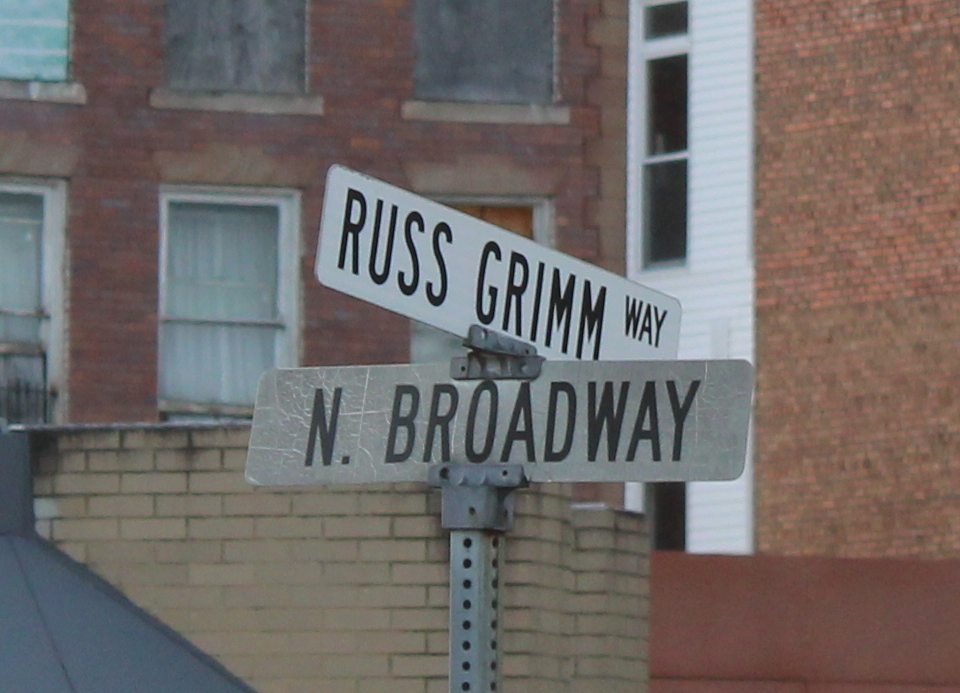
Street named for Grimm in his hometown of Scottdale, Pennsylvania

Grimm attended Southmoreland High School, playing both quarterback and linebacker there, while also serving as the team's punter. After high school, Grimm accepted a scholarship to play college football at the University of Pittsburgh as a linebacker. However, he found the team already had several linebackers on their roster. Despite never playing on the offensive line before, Grimm decided to convert to center because the team was lacking sufficient players at that position. "I wanted to play," he explained when asked why he made the change. "We needed depth at center." Over the span of his four years in college, Grimm would go from 205 to 270 pounds.

Grimm was the center for Pitt from 1977 to 1980. He was part of an elite team that included future Hall of Fame linebacker Rickey Jackson, future Pro Bowl guard Mark May, and future Pro Bowl linebacker Hugh Green, who all joined the team in the same year, as well as future Hall of Fame quarterback Dan Marino, who joined the Panthers in Grimm's final two seasons. In 1980, the team added future five-time pro bowl defensive lineman Bill Maas, future NFL receiver Dwight Collins, and future NFL defensive back Tim Lewis. Those two years of 1979 and 1980 were among the best in school history, as the team posted a 22–2 record over that span and barely missed out on playing for the national championship both times. In 1980, future Pro Bowl tackle Jimbo Covert joined Grimm on the offensive line, giving Pitt a total of three future Pro Bowl stars out of their five offensive line starters. "There were games when my uniform never got dirty," recalled Marino. "There were games when I never hit the ground. That's incredible."

== Professional playing career ==
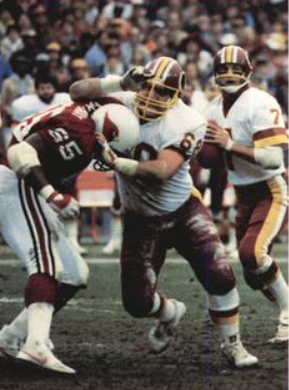
1986 card of Grimm for Washington Redskins

Grimm was drafted 69th overall in the third round by the Redskins in the 1981 NFL draft. Along with Jeff Bostic, Mark May, George Starke and Joe Jacoby, Grimm was a founding member of the Redskins' renowned "Hogs" offensive line of the 1980s and early 1990s (deemed one of the best front fives of NFL history), which was a mainstay of the Redskins' glory years during the first Joe Gibbs era.

During his 11 seasons as the Redskins' starting guard, Grimm helped lead the team to four Super Bowl appearances and three Super Bowl victories (Super Bowl XVII in 1983, Super Bowl XXII in 1988, and Super Bowl XXVI in 1992). Along the way, he was selected to four consecutive Pro Bowl appearances (1983–1986). Grimm was named an All-Pro in each of those years as well.

Joe Bugel, Grimm's former offensive line coach and the Boss Hog, said that Grimm could play anywhere, "He was one of the most complete football players, and people, that I've ever coached. He could play all the positions – center, guard and tackle. He was the leader by example."

According to Mark May, a teammate both at Pittsburgh and on the Redskins, no one lived up to the "Hog" persona more than Grimm: "He was a blue collar stiff and proud of it." In his 2005 memoir, May recalled a Christmas party at his house in 1982: "I iced down a keg of beer and stationed it on the landing between the first floor and basement. Russ turned the landing into his headquarters for the evening. He grabbed a chair and a Hog shot glass (a 60-ounce pitcher) and parked his butt on the landing next to the keg. Except for an occasional trip to the bathroom, we didn't see Russ on the first level all night..."

Don Warren - the Washington tight end, and fellow Hog - once said about Grimm's congeniality, "Russ Grimm would swallow his dip by halftime and throw up on somebody's shoes."

Grimm was a semifinalist for the Pro Football Hall of Fame in 2004, and a finalist in 2005, 2006, 2007, and 2008. He was elected to the Hall of Fame in 2010. The bust of Grimm, sculpted by Scott Myers, was unveiled at the Enshrinement Ceremony on August 8, 2010.

== Coaching career ==
=== Washington Redskins ===
After retiring as a player, Grimm returned to the Redskins as a tight end coach (from 1992 through 1996, and offensive line coach from 1997 through 2000, during which he was instrumental in the development of tackles Chris Samuels and Jon Jansen.

=== Pittsburgh Steelers ===
Grimm joined the Pittsburgh Steelers as offensive line coach in September 2000. In 2004, he was promoted to assistant head coach (offensive line).

In 2004, after the Chicago Bears fired Dick Jauron, Bears management considered Grimm as a top candidate for the job. The job eventually went to then St. Louis Rams defensive coordinator Lovie Smith.

In 2005, Grimm added another Super Bowl ring (totaling four) to his résumé as part of the Pittsburgh Steelers' coaching staff (offensive line coach). Under Grimm's guidance in 2005, the Super Bowl champion Steelers averaged nearly 140 yards rushing per game during the regular season to rank fifth in the NFL while also grinding out 181 rushing yards in their Super Bowl XL victory over the Seattle Seahawks. In 2006, the Steelers' offensive line helped pave the way for running back Willie Parker to gain 1,494 yards and 13 touchdowns on 337 carries with 4.4-yard avg. and earn his first Pro Bowl selection. The Pittsburgh offense finished the 2006 season with the 10th-best rushing attack in the NFL, helping to give the Steelers the seventh ranked total offense in the league. Parker finished the season with the second and third top rushing performances of the year in the NFL with 223 rushing yards on 32 attempts and a TD against Cleveland Browns and 213 yards on 22 rushes and two TDs vs. New Orleans Saints.

On January 5, 2007, Bill Cowher resigned as head coach of the Steelers. In the press conference that followed, Steelers' president Art Rooney II announced Grimm as one of the candidates for the job. He was named as a finalist for the job along with Ken Whisenhunt and Mike Tomlin.

After the Arizona Cardinals hired Whisenhunt as their new head coach, on January 14, 2007, the finalists for the Steelers position were reduced to Grimm and Minnesota Vikings defensive coordinator Mike Tomlin. On January 22, 2007, Mike Prisuta of the Pittsburgh Tribune-Review reported from an undisclosed source within the Steelers organization that then-assistant coach Grimm would replace Bill Cowher as the team's coach. A day earlier, ESPN and Sports Illustrated stated on their web sites that Tomlin had been chosen to replace Cowher. However, the Tribune-Review claimed that an unnamed "NFL source" said that on January 21, 2007, Tomlin had not heard from the Steelers and no contract negotiations had taken place. Grimm was one of three finalists to replace Cowher, along with Tomlin and Chicago Bears defensive coordinator Ron Rivera.

Twenty-four hours later, Tomlin was announced as the Steelers' new coach. Steelers' President Art Rooney II told CBS Sports on January 23, 2007, that no formal offer was ever made to Grimm, explaining that team representatives did talk about an offer and contract numbers with both Grimm and Tomlin on January 20. Rooney explained, "We did tell Russ nothing would be final until Sunday. I feel bad if he got the wrong impression." The Tribune-Review and Prisuta refused to comment on their blunder, and Prisuta's story was discredited and removed from their website.

=== Arizona Cardinals ===
On January 23, 2007, Grimm was hired to serve under Whisenhunt as the Arizona Cardinals assistant head coach and offensive line coach.

In Grimm's first season in Arizona, the offensive line allowed 24 sacks, sixth best in the NFL and the fewest given up by the Cardinals since 1978 with 22. Grimm's offensive line also paved the way for running back Edgerrin James to rush for 1,222 yards, the fifth-best total in team history. The Cardinals' offense finished with the fifth-best passing attack in the NFL and threw for a team-record 32 touchdowns.

Grimm remained with the Cardinals until Whisenhunt and the entire offensive staff were fired in December 2012, following a 5–11 season.

=== Tennessee Titans ===
On January 26, 2016, the Tennessee Titans hired Grimm as their offensive line coach. In his first year, Tennessee's offensive line was one of the best in the league. Left tackle Taylor Lewan went to the Pro Bowl and rookie right tackle Jack Conklin was voted a first-team All Pro.

Grimm announced his retirement from coaching after the 2017 season.

== Personal life ==
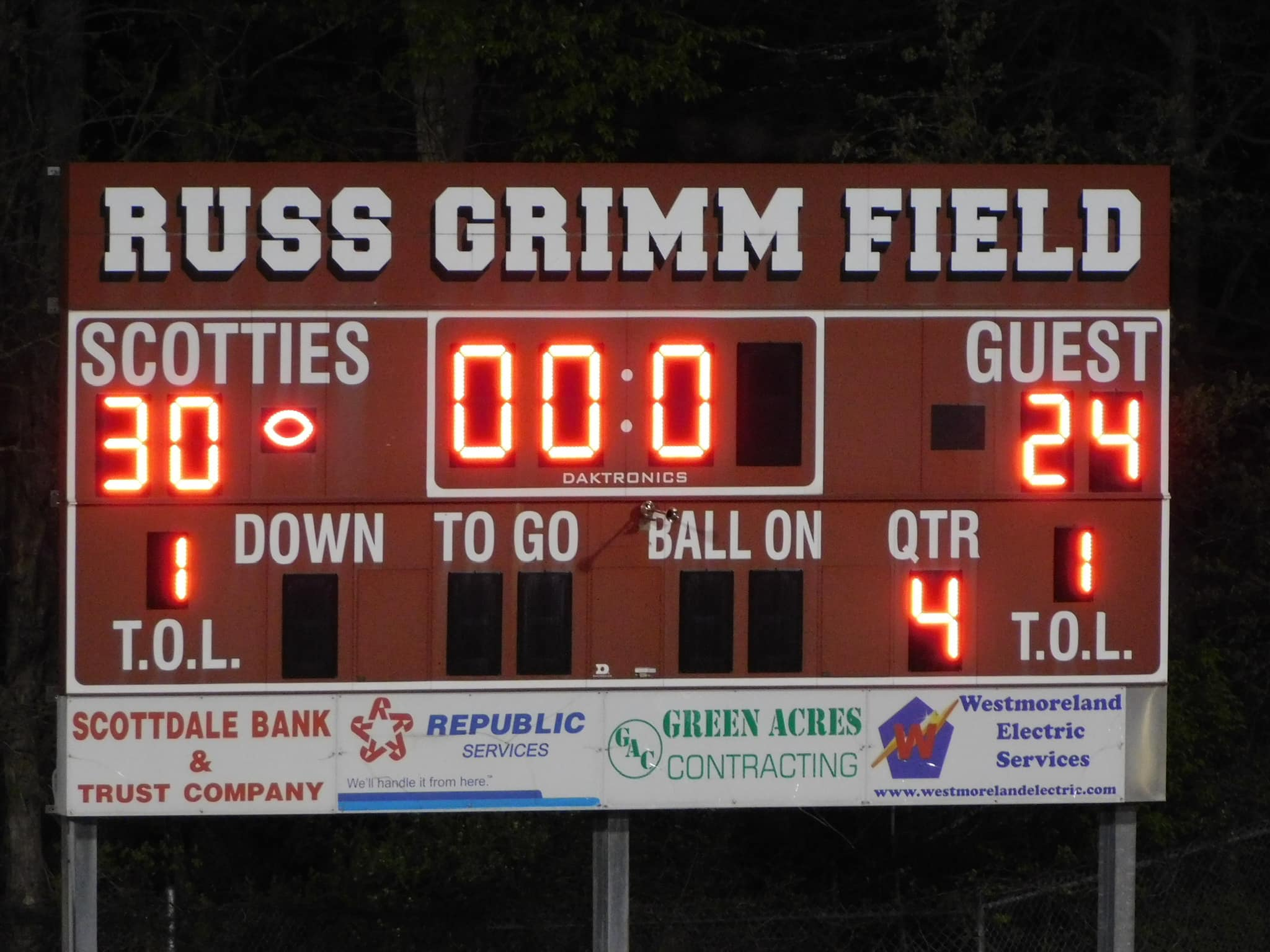
Southmoreland's football field is dedicated to Grimm

In high school, Grimm punted, played quarterback and linebacker at Southmoreland High School while earning nine varsity letters and starring on the basketball team.

Grimm was inducted into the Western Pennsylvania Sports Hall of Fame. His younger brother, Donn, was a starting linebacker on Notre Dame 1988 national championship team and signed with the Cardinals as a rookie free agent in 1991. Grimm has four children: Chad, Cody, and fraternal twins Devin and Dylan. All of his children attended Oakton High School in Fairfax County, Virginia. Chad played football at Virginia Tech and served as an assistant coach for the Redskins from 2009 to 2019, and Dylan plays lacrosse at Loyola University Maryland. His second eldest son, Cody, also played at Virginia Tech and was drafted by the Tampa Bay Buccaneers in the seventh round of the 2010 NFL draft. Cody would later go into coaching. His daughter, Devin, played soccer at St. Mary’s in Maryland.

Grimm is featured in the video game All-Pro Football 2K8.
