= Joe Jacoby =

American football player (born 1959)

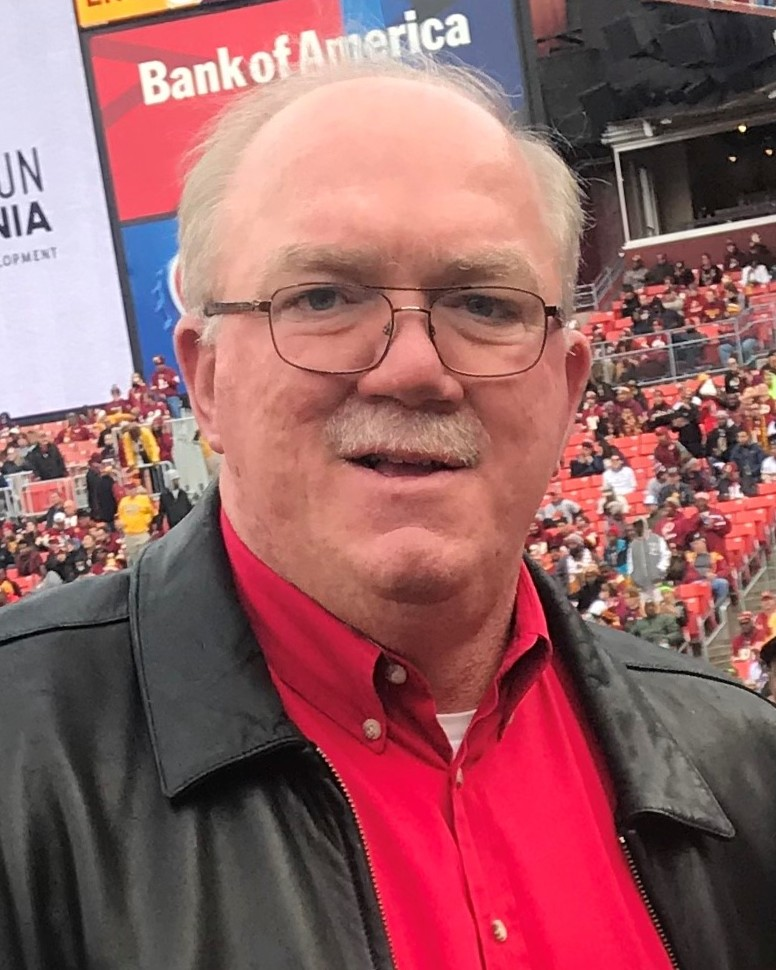
- Jacoby in 2018

No. 66
- Position: Offensive tackle

Personal information
- Born: July 6, 1959 (age 67); Louisville, Kentucky, U.S.
- Listed height: 6 ft 7 in (2.01 m)
- Listed weight: 295 lb (134 kg)

Career information
- High school: Western (Louisville)
- College: Louisville
- NFL draft: 1981: undrafted

Career history
- Washington Redskins (1981–1993)

Awards and highlights
- 3× Super Bowl champion (XVII, XXII, XXVI); 3× First-team All-Pro (1983, 1984, 1987); 4× Pro Bowl (1983–1986); PFWA All-Rookie Team (1981); NFL 1980s All-Decade Team; Washington Redskins Ring of Fame; Louisville Cardinals Ring of Honor

Career NFL statistics
- Games played: 170
- Games started: 148
- Touchdowns: 1
- Stats at Pro Football Reference

Joseph Erwin Jacoby (born July 6, 1959) is an American former professional football player who was an offensive tackle for the Washington Redskins of the National Football League (NFL). He won three Super Bowls during his tenure with the team.

== College career ==
Jacoby started off as an offensive tackle for the University of Louisville from 1978 to 1980. He was a three-year letterman, and the team co-captain in his senior season. Jacoby was inducted into Louisville's Athletic Hall of Fame in 2004. Still, the team achieved limited success with Jacoby, posting a 16–16 overall record in his three seasons, with only one season with a winning record and no Bowl game appearances.

== Professional career ==
After college, Jacoby went undrafted. He signed a free agent contract with the Washington Redskins in 1981, where he embarked on an enviable career—four Super Bowl appearances, of which his team won three (XVII in 1983, XXII in 1988, and XXVI in 1992), plus four consecutive Pro Bowl selections from 1983 to 1986.

Along with Jeff Bostic, Mark May, George Starke and Russ Grimm, Jacoby was a founding member of the Redskins' renowned "Hogs" offensive line of the 1980s and early 1990s (deemed one of the best front fives of NFL history), which was a mainstay of the Redskins' glory years during the first Joe Gibbs era.

Jacoby was the lead blocker on John Riggins' famous touchdown run which ensured the Redskins' Super Bowl XVII win over the Dolphins in 1983. In that game, the Redskins set a Super Bowl record for most rushing yards with 276. The Hogs helped the Redskins break that record five years later in Super Bowl XXII, in which Washington trampled over the Denver Broncos with 280 rushing yards en route to the second of the Redskins' three championships.

In 1990, Jacoby was selected by the Pro Football Hall of Fame to the 1980s All Decade Team. Despite his three 1st team All-Pro selections and three Super Bowl championships as a member of the Redskins, he remains the only offensive tackle from the all-decade team not enshrined in the Hall of Fame. From 2016 to 2018, Jacoby was a finalist but was not selected.

== Personal life ==
One year after the Redskins' third Super Bowl victory in 1992, Jacoby retired, after which he became the owner of an auto dealership in Warrenton, Virginia.

Jacoby became an assistant football coach at Shenandoah University in Winchester, Virginia. He began as a part-time volunteer in 2008 and was hired as a full-time employee in 2009. In 2014, Jacoby was hired as the offensive line coach for Concordia University Chicago.

Jacoby and his wife, Irene, have two daughters.
