= Fred Dean (offensive lineman) =

American football player (born 1955)

No. 63
- Positions: Offensive tackle, Guard

Personal information
- Born: March 30, 1955 (age 71); Gainesville, Florida, U.S.
- Listed height: 6 ft 3 in (1.91 m)
- Listed weight: 253 lb (115 kg)

Career information
- High school: Gainesville (FL)
- College: Texas Southern
- NFL draft: 1977: undrafted

Career history
- Chicago Bears (1977); Washington Redskins (1978–1982)

Awards and highlights
- Super Bowl champion (XVII)

Career NFL statistics
- Games played: 40
- Games started: 9
- Fumble recoveries: 1
- Stats at Pro Football Reference

Frederick Gregory Dean (born March 30, 1955) is an American former professional football player who was an offensive tackle and guard from 1978 to 1982 for the Washington Redskins of the National Football League (NFL). He later played with the Tampa Bay Bandits of the United States Football League (USFL). Dean played college football at Texas Southern University.

Dean is a former member of the football coaching staff at Howard University. He also worked with Howard University's Office of Residence Life as a Community Director until his retirement after over 20 years of service.
