= Rick "Doc" Walker =

American football player (born 1955)

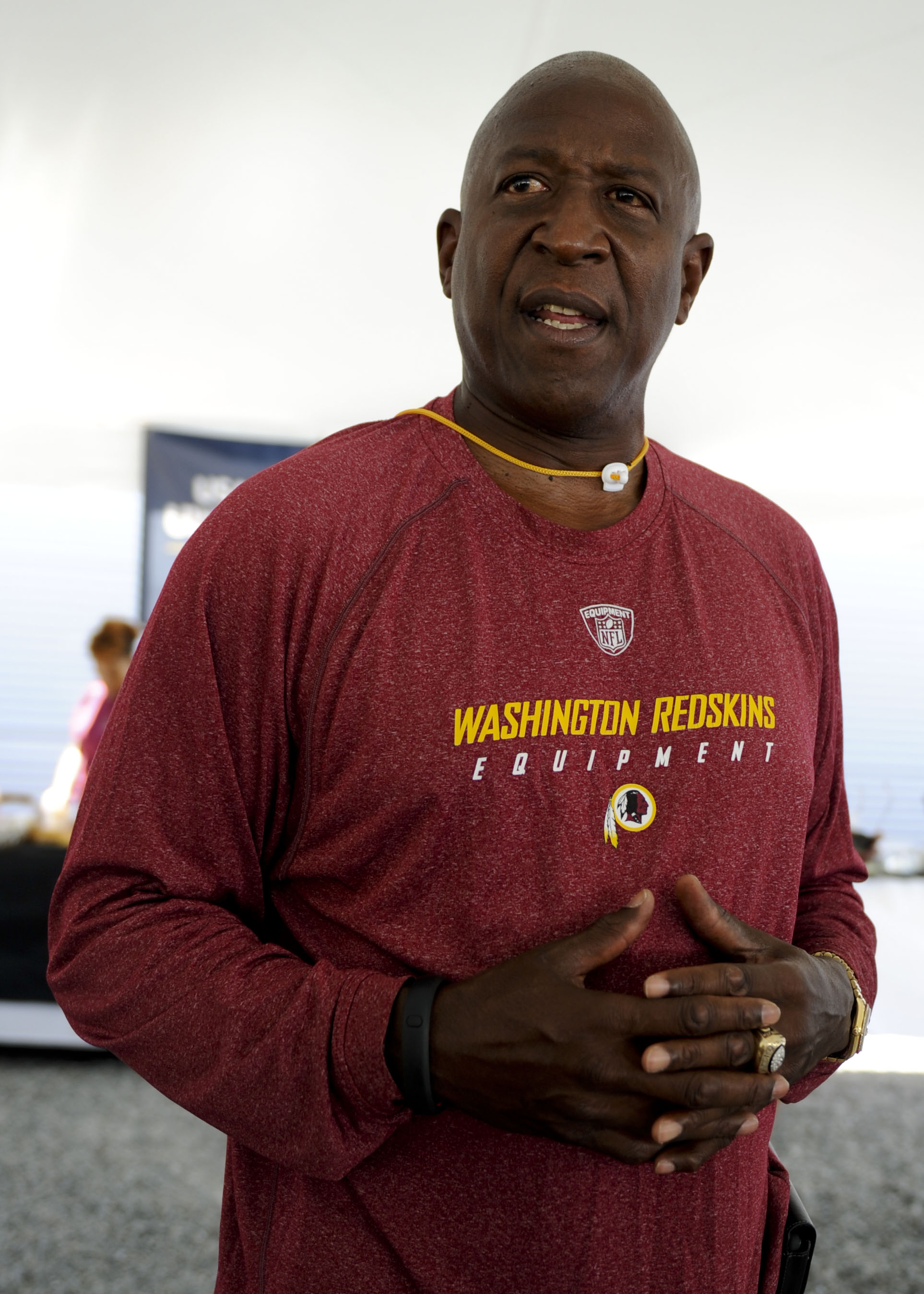
- Walker in 2015

No. 88, 83
- Position: Tight end

Personal information
- Born: May 28, 1955 (age 71); Cherry Point, North Carolina, U.S.
- Listed height: 6 ft 4 in (1.93 m)
- Listed weight: 235 lb (107 kg)

Career information
- High school: Valley (Santa Ana, California)
- College: UCLA
- NFL draft: 1977: 4th round, 85th overall pick

Career history
- Cincinnati Bengals (1977–1979); Washington Redskins (1980–1985)

Awards and highlights
- Super Bowl champion (XVII); First-team All-Pac-8 (1976)

Career NFL statistics
- Receptions: 70
- Receiving yards: 673
- Receiving touchdowns: 9
- Stats at Pro Football Reference

Richard "Doc" Walker (born May 28, 1955) is an American former professional football player who was a tight end in the National Football League (NFL) for the Cincinnati Bengals and the Washington Redskins. He played college football with the UCLA Bruins. He won a Super Bowl with Washington. After his playing career, he became a radio sports commentator.

== Playing career ==
Walker played college football at UCLA and won the 1976 Rose Bowl with them. He was drafted in the fourth round for the 1977 NFL draft by the Bengals. He moved to the Redskins in 1980 and contributed to the team winning Super Bowl XVII in the 1982 season.

== Broadcasting career ==
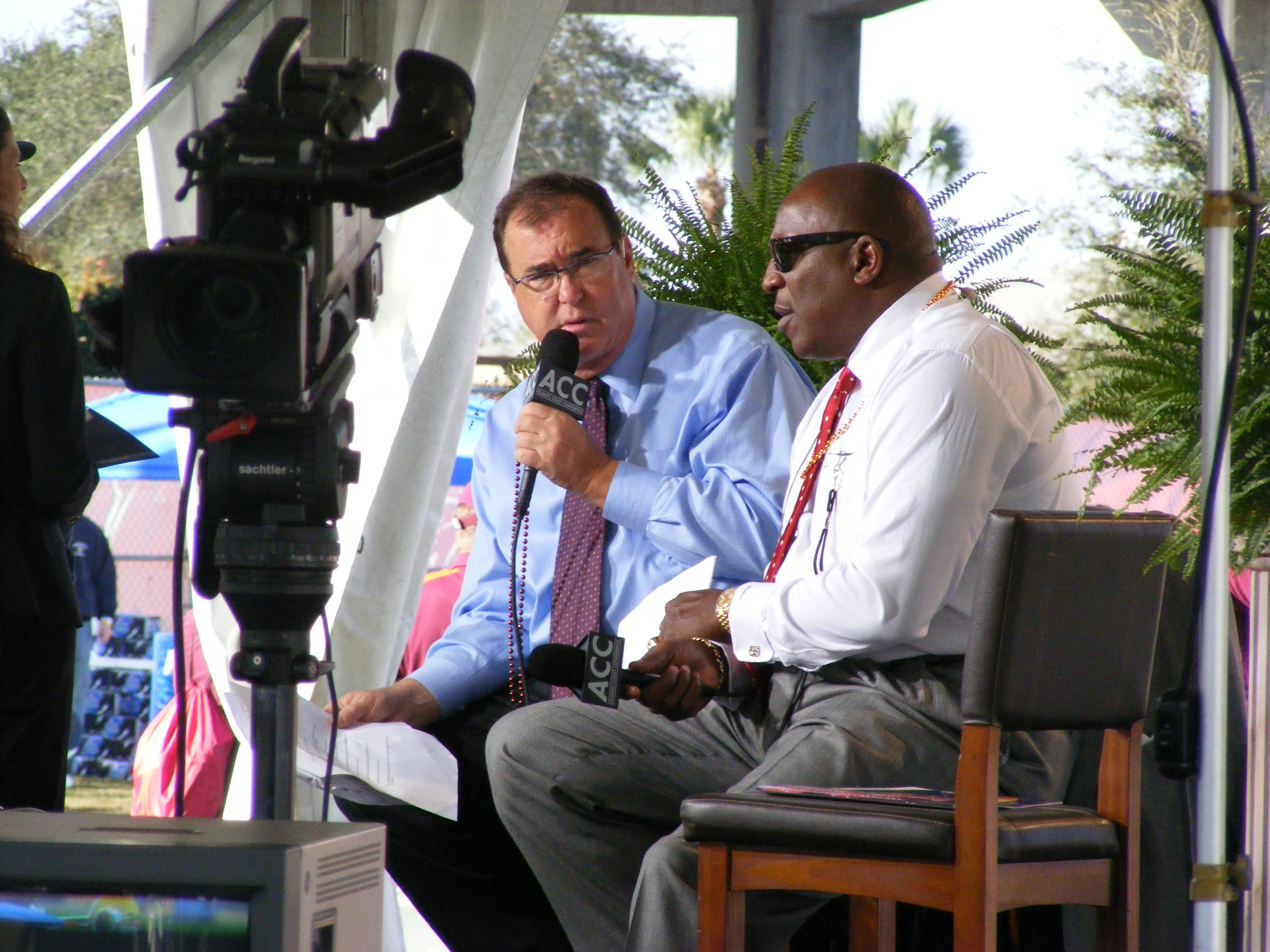
Walker (right) with Mike Hogewood covering the 2007 ACC Championship Game for Raycom Sports.

Walker currently covers sports during radio broadcasts in the Washington Metro Area. Let go from Team 980 in 2020. He hosts a weekly television show called "Doc Walker's ProView," which airs Sunday mornings on ESPN 980 and Tuesday evenings at 11pm on MASN. In 2011, he moved into the color analyst’s seat for radio broadcasts of Washington Football Team games on ESPN 980 after previously serving as the sideline reporter. As of 2019, he is currently once again the sideline reporter for Washington Football Team radio broadcasts.

Previously he had been a co-host on The John Thompson Show and The Locker room with Doc Walker and Kevin Sheehan. He also appears in D.C. Lottery and BMW of Sterling commercials. He previously worked for Westwood One as a color commentator for college football broadcasts and a sideline reporter and occasional color commentator for the NFL on Westwood One. Up until the 2010 college football season, he was also the main color analyst for ACC football games for Raycom Sports with Steve Martin.
