= Super Bowl XXII =

1988 Edition of the Super Bowl

Washington Redskins (3) (NFC) (11–4)	Denver Broncos (1) (AFC) (10–4–1)
42	10
Head coach: Joe Gibbs	Head coach: Dan Reeves
	1	2	3	4	Total
WAS	0	35	0	7	42
DEN	10	0	0	0	10
- Date: January 31, 1988
- Kickoff time: 3:20 p.m. PST (UTC-8)
- Stadium: Jack Murphy Stadium; San Diego, California
- MVP: Doug Williams, quarterback
- Favorite: Broncos by 3
- Referee: Bob McElwee
- Attendance: 73,302

Ceremonies
- National anthem: Herb Alpert
- Coin toss: Don Hutson
- Halftime show: Chubby Checker and The Rockettes, USC and San Diego State Marching Bands

TV in the United States
- Network: ABC
- Announcers: Al Michaels, Frank Gifford, and Dan Dierdorf
- Nielsen ratings: 41.9 (est. 80.14 million viewers)
- Market share: 62
- Cost of 30-second commercial: $645,000

Radio in the United States
- Network: CBS Radio
- Announcers: Jack Buck and Hank Stram

Super Bowl XXII was an American football game between the National Football Conference (NFC) champion Washington Redskins and American Football Conference (AFC) champion Denver Broncos to decide the National Football League (NFL) champion for the 1987 season. The Redskins defeated the Broncos by the score of 42–10, winning their second Super Bowl. The game was played on January 31, 1988, at Jack Murphy Stadium in San Diego, California, which was the first time that the Super Bowl was played there. It was the second consecutive Super Bowl loss for the Broncos, who had lost to the New York Giants in the Super Bowl the year before.

This Super Bowl came at the end of a season that was shortened by a players' strike. Each team only missed one regular season game due to the labor dispute, but three games were played mostly with replacement players until the dispute was settled. This proved particularly costly for the defending Super Bowl champion New York Giants, who lost all three of their "replacement player games" and failed to make the playoffs. The Broncos were making their second consecutive (and third overall) Super Bowl appearance, after posting a 10–4–1 regular season record, largely through the strength of their quarterback, John Elway. The Redskins, who were making their fourth Super Bowl appearance, posted an 11–4 regular season record. Washington was led by quarterback Doug Williams, who entered the season as a backup, and was 0–2 as a starter during the regular season. He ended up leading Washington to their two playoff victories. In doing so, he was the first African-American quarterback ever to start in an NFL league championship game, let alone a Super Bowl.

After trailing 10–0 at the end of the first quarter of the game, the Redskins scored 42 unanswered points, including a record-breaking 35 points in the second quarter, setting several other Super Bowl records, including most rushing yards (280) and most total yards (602). Williams, who was named the Super Bowl MVP, completed 18 of 29 passes for a Super Bowl record 340 yards and four touchdowns, with one interception. He also became the first player in Super Bowl history to pass for four touchdowns in a single quarter, and four in a half. Williams was the first African-American starting quarterback to win a Super Bowl.

== Background ==
=== Host selection process ===
NFL owners voted to award Super Bowl XXII to San Diego on May 24, 1984, during their May 23–25, 1984 meetings in Washington, D.C. This was the first of three Super Bowls played at Jack Murphy Stadium (the others being XXXII and XXXVII, both of which occurred after it was renamed Qualcomm Stadium).

Fourteen cities were part of the bidding process, which was scheduled to award four Super Bowls (XXI, XXII, XXIII, and XXIV). The bidding cities included: Anaheim, Detroit, Houston, Jacksonville, Miami, Minneapolis, New Orleans, Pasadena, Philadelphia, San Francisco, San Diego, Seattle, Tampa, and Phoenix/Tempe. The Philadelphia host committee assembled what was considered a strong, but long-shot bid, hoping to win the first outdoor Super Bowl in a cold weather city. Tempe and Jacksonville had no NFL team at the time; the Cardinals moved from St. Louis to Tempe in 1988, and the Jaguars were awarded as an expansion team in 1993, starting play in 1995.

The balloting for XXI took over two hours to complete. XXII was also voted on, but the voting for XXIII and XXIV was postponed. San Diego was awarded XXII, marking the second time that consecutive Super Bowls were played in the same state, with Pasadena selected for XXI. This has now happened four times in NFL history; Super Bowls II and III were both played at the Miami Orange Bowl and Super Bowls XLIII and XLIV were played in Florida (at Raymond James Stadium in Tampa and Hard Rock Stadium in Miami Gardens) and then repeated eleven years later with the roles reversed with Miami receiving Super Bowl LIV and Tampa receiving Super Bowl LV.

=== Washington Redskins ===
The primary storyline surrounding Super Bowl XXII was that Washington's Doug Williams was the first African-American quarterback ever to start in a Super Bowl. This was even more meaningful given that the Redskins had been among the last teams to sign a black player after they reentered the league.

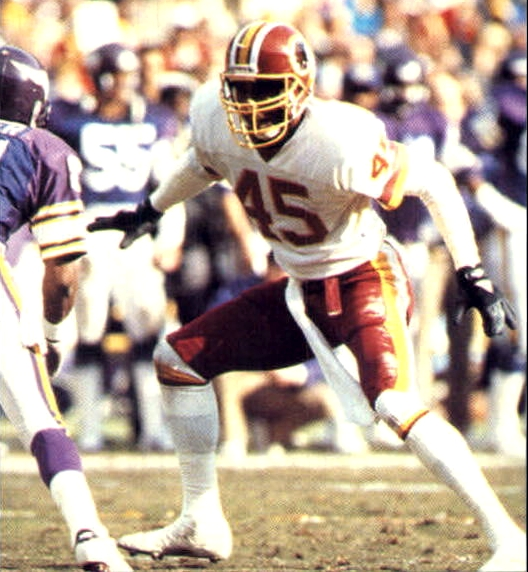
Redskins cornerback Barry Wilburn was a key player in Washington's defensive unit, who snagged two interceptions during Super Bowl XXII.

Williams had taken a rather unconventional route to the Super Bowl. He began his career as the first round draft pick of the Tampa Bay Buccaneers in 1978. After five seasons (including a trip to the NFC championship game in 1979), a contract dispute caused him to leave the team and sit out the entire 1983 season before signing with the Oklahoma Outlaws of the newly formed USFL. When that league folded a few years later, Williams found himself out of a job until Redskins coach Joe Gibbs asked him to join the team to be the backup for quarterback Jay Schroeder. Williams played just one game in 1986, and spent most of the 1987 season on the bench. But injuries and inconsistent play from Schroeder made Gibbs promote Williams to starting quarterback.

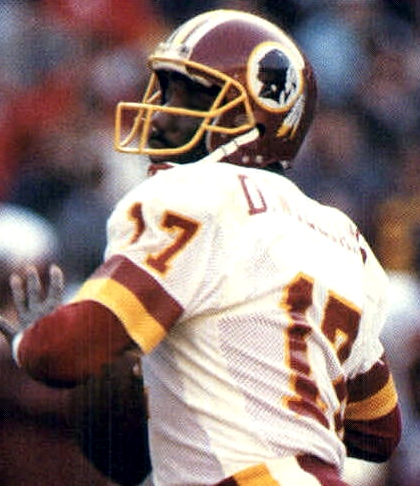
Redskins quarterback Doug Williams became the first black quarterback to start in a Super Bowl and was the only one to have emerged victorious until Russell Wilson won Super Bowl XLVIII with the Seattle Seahawks.

Williams had played extremely well in his five regular season games, passing for 1,156 yards, 11 touchdowns and five interceptions. The Redskins' main receiving threat was wide receiver Gary Clark, who caught 56 passes for 1,066 yards, an average of 19 yards per catch. Wide receivers Ricky Sanders and Art Monk were also deep threats, combining for 80 receptions and 1,130 yards. Running back George Rogers was Washington's leading rusher with 613 yards. However, Rogers saw limited action in Super Bowl XXII due to injuries that later forced him into early retirement. Rookie running back Timmy Smith started in his place. Fullback Kelvin Bryant also was a big contributor, rushing for 406 yards, and catching 43 passes for 490 yards during the 1987 season. The Redskins offensive line was anchored by tackle Joe Jacoby, a 4-time pro bowl selection, and future Hall of Fame Center Russ Grimm.

The Redskins also had an excellent defensive unit, led by defensive backs Barry Wilburn, who recorded nine interceptions for 135 return yards and one touchdown; Todd Bowles, who intercepted four passes; and Darrell Green. Their line was anchored by defensive ends Charles Mann, who led the team with 9.5 sacks and recovered a fumble; and Dexter Manley, who recorded 8.5 sacks.

The Redskins finished the 1987 strike-shortened regular season as NFC East champions with an 11–4 record and the third seed in the NFC playoffs.

=== Denver Broncos ===
The Broncos advanced to their second consecutive Super Bowl, overall the third appearance in team history. Quarterback John Elway had another excellent season, passing for 3,198 yards and 19 touchdowns. He was also the team's second leading rusher with 304 yards and four touchdowns. Wide receivers Vance Johnson and Ricky Nattiel, and tight end Clarence Kay, combined for 104 receptions and 1,754 yards. Running back Sammy Winder was the leading rusher with 741 yards and six touchdowns, while fullback Gene Lang rushed for 304 yards and caught 17 receptions. Denver's offensive line was led by guard Keith Bishop, who earned his second consecutive Pro Bowl selection. The Broncos also possessed a solid defensive unit, led by outside linebacker Karl Mecklenburg, who recorded 7 sacks and picked off three passes, and defensive back Mike Harden with four interceptions. Defensive end Rulon Jones led the line with 7 sacks.

The Broncos finished the strike-shortened 1987 season winning the AFC West with a 10–4–1 record and the number one seed in the AFC playoffs. Dan Reeves was the head coach.

=== Playoffs ===
The Broncos routed the Houston Oilers in the divisional round of the playoffs, 34–10, jumping to a 14–0 first-quarter lead off of two quick Oilers turnovers, with Elway completing 14 of 25 passes for 259 yards and two touchdowns in the game. Vance Johnson recorded four catches for 105 yards, including a 55-yard reception to set up Elway's second touchdown pass. However, Johnson was injured during the game; he ended up missing AFC Championship game, and played only sparingly in the Super Bowl. Denver also lost safety Mike Harden for the rest of the season with a broken arm.

Denver then won the AFC Championship Game in exciting fashion over the AFC Central champion Cleveland Browns, 38–33 for the second consecutive year. The Broncos seemed to be in control of the game during the first half, taking a 21–3 lead. However, with quarterback Bernie Kosar, Cleveland rallied back and tied the score 31–31 in the fourth quarter. Elway responded with a 20-yard touchdown pass to Sammy Winder, taking the lead back with less than five minutes left in regulation. The Browns took the ball back and drove to the Denver 8-yard line, but the drive ended with a play that became known as The Fumble, resulting in more bad luck in Cleveland professional sports lore: Denver defensive back Jeremiah Castille stripped the football from Browns running back Earnest Byner and recovered the ensuing fumble as Byner was rushing in for the potential tying touchdown, securing the Broncos' win.

Meanwhile, the Redskins had narrow wins in the playoffs. First, they won at Soldier Field against the Chicago Bears, 21–17, ending Walter Payton's career. The key play was a 52-yard punt return for a touchdown by Redskins defensive back Darrell Green for the go-ahead touchdown. The Bears' Kevin Butler kicked a field goal to close the deficit to 21–17, but the Bears could get no closer. Noteworthy was the Redskins trailed 14–0 early in the game.

The Redskins won a defensive battle against the surprising Minnesota Vikings in the NFC Championship Game, 17–10. The Vikings barely made the playoffs with an 8–7 record during the strike-shortened regular season, but advanced to the NFC championship by winning on the road against the teams with the best records in the NFL, defeating the 12–3 New Orleans Saints 44–10, and the 13–2 San Francisco 49ers 36–24. The experienced Redskins, who had narrowly defeated Minnesota in a 27–24 overtime game during Week 15 of the season, put an end to the Vikings' string of upsets, aided by Williams' go-ahead touchdown pass to wide receiver Gary Clark with five minutes remaining to lead 17–10. Then they sealed the victory with 56 seconds left when Green knocked a pass out of the hands of running back Darrin Nelson at the one yard line on a fourth down and four play from the Redskins 6-yard line.

=== Super Bowl pregame news ===
Coming into Super Bowl XXII, the Broncos were favored to win (−3 as noted on the NFL Today show by Jimmy "the Greek" Snyder) because most experts thought both teams were equal in terms of talent with Elway presumed to be the superior quarterback to Williams. Elway had won the NFL Most Valuable Player Award and was selected to start for the AFC in the Pro Bowl, while Williams had played just five regular season games in the 1987 season.

Before the game, it was announced that Williams underwent emergency root canal treatment for an abscessed lower right molar the previous night. Team dentist Barry Rudolph said there were no complications, and Williams then was pronounced fit to start.

As the designated home team in the annual rotation between AFC and NFC teams, the Broncos opted to wear their home orange uniforms and white pants. The Redskins, as the road team, countered with white uniforms and burgundy pants that they typically wore during home games and which they also wore in their two previous Super Bowl appearances during the 1980s.

== Broadcasting ==
The game was broadcast in the United States by ABC. The broadcast featured with play-by-play announcer Al Michaels and color commentators Frank Gifford and Dan Dierdorf. Keith Jackson hosted the pregame, halftime, and postgame coverage for ABC, joined by analysts Lynn Swann and Mike Adamle as well as then Cleveland Browns head coach Marty Schottenheimer and then Minnesota Vikings head coach Jerry Burns. Bob Griese was originally planned to co-host with Jackson, but had to bow out due his wife Judi who was in the late stages of breast cancer, from which she died on February 15, 1988. Also helping with ABC's coverage were Jack Whitaker, Jim Hill and Becky Dixon. This was the first Super Bowl broadcast on ABC with the broadcast team of Michaels, Gifford, and Dierdorf in the booth (as the 1987 season was the first year the trio was together, with Dierdorf moving to ABC from CBS; Gifford was the only holdover from ABC's Super Bowl XIX telecast). The trio went on to man the booth for ABC's Monday Night Football from 1987 to 1997 and called Super Bowls XXV and XXIX.

The game was broadcast nationally on radio by CBS, with Jack Buck handling the play-by-play duties and color commentator Hank Stram in the broadcast booth, and Jim Hunter reporting from the sidelines. Brent Musburger anchored the Super Bowl XXII pregame, halftime, and postgame coverage with analysis from Will McDonough for CBS. Locally, Super Bowl XXII was broadcast on WMAL-AM in Washington, D.C. by Frank Herzog, Sam Huff and Sonny Jurgensen, and on KOA-AM in Denver, Colorado by Bob Martin and Larry Zimmer.

ABC's Super Bowl lead-out programs was the series debut of The Wonder Years. This was only the second successful series to debut following a Super Bowl up to that time (The A-Team, which had premiered following Super Bowl XVII, was the first). The Wonder Years was a late switch by ABC, which had initially scheduled the two-hour premiere of China Beach, but concerns about the game running long and potentially pushing the premiere episode's conclusion after midnight Eastern Time contributed to the program change.

The game was simulcast in Canada on CTV and in the United Kingdom on Channel 4. It was also the first Super Bowl in which Mexico's Televisa brought a team of its own (instead of relying on the U.S. signal with comments made from Mexico City), airing on its Canal de las Estrellas.

The NFL Films NFL's Greatest Games highlight film was titled Ambush at Super Bowl XXII; and was the first such highlight film to feature former Boston and Buffalo radio personality Jeff Kaye as its narrator.

== Entertainment ==
The pregame festivities featured a tribute to entertainer Bob Hope, who was approaching the age of 85. Members representing the military service branches marched out onto the field in full dress uniforms, and in unison saluted Bob Hope for his dedication to helping the troops. Trumpeter Herb Alpert performed "The Star-Spangled Banner", while Pro Football Hall of Fame wide receiver Don Hutson participated in the coin toss ceremony (the game happened to coincide with Hutson's 75th birthday). Alpert's performance was the last non-vocal performance of the National Anthem in a Super Bowl to date. At the conclusion of the anthem, the U.S. Navy Blue Angels demonstration squadron performed their first ever flyover at a Super Bowl in their blue and gold F-18 Hornets.

The halftime show, produced by Radio City Music Hall, was titled "Something Grand" and featured performances by vocalist Chubby Checker, The Rockettes, and 88 grand pianos with the USC and San Diego State marching bands. Among the 44 Radio City Music Hall Rockettes, American performer Jennifer Jones made her national debut as its first African-American Rockette. Checker's performance marked the first time a major artist performed during the show.

This was the final Super Bowl to feature the football-style logo at the 35-yard-line which had been in use since Super Bowl XIV.

== Game summary ==
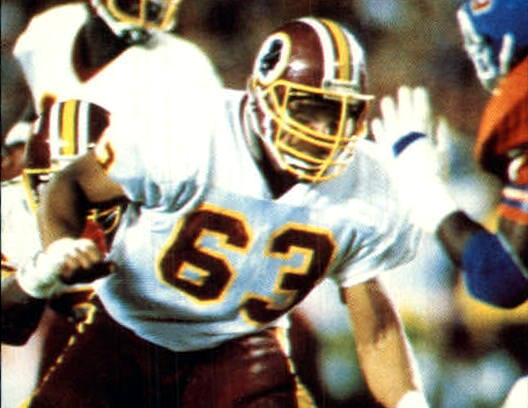
Redskins guard Raleigh McKenzie covering an opponent on the Broncos during Super Bowl XXII.

=== First quarter ===
The game got off to a promising start for Denver. After forcing the Redskins to go three-and-out, the Broncos scored on their very first play from scrimmage, when quarterback John Elway threw a 56-yard touchdown pass to wide receiver Ricky Nattiel, giving Denver a 7–0 lead after just 1:57 had elapsed in the game. It was the earliest touchdown any team had ever scored in Super Bowl history to that point (the record was later broken by Jerry Rice in Super Bowl XXIX, and again by Devin Hester in Super Bowl XLI). Immediately after the score, cornerback Darrell Green went over to teammate Barry Wilburn (who was covering Nattiel) and told Wilburn to forget about that play. The Broncos quickly forced Washington to punt again, and once again Elway displayed his superb scrambling skills. On the second play of Denver's ensuing possession, Elway completed a 32-yard pass to wide receiver Mark Jackson. Then, Elway caught a 23-yard pass from running back Steve Sewell, becoming the first quarterback ever to catch a pass in the Super Bowl (Elway had scored a receiving touchdown during opening day the previous year against the Raiders). Washington managed to halt Denver's drive on the 6, but kicker Rich Karlis kicked a 24-yard field goal to increase the Broncos' lead to 10–0.

After yet another Redskins punt, Denver managed to drive to the Washington 30 on their third possession with two runs by running back Gene Lang for a total of 24 yards and an 18-yard reception by Sewell. But this time, they failed to extend their lead after Elway threw two incomplete passes, then got sacked for an 18-yard loss by safety Alvin Walton on third down, pushing the Broncos out of field goal range and forcing their first punt of the game.

Meanwhile, the Redskins could not generate any offensive momentum in the first quarter, with the Broncos' defense forcing a punt on every drive. On the second play of Washington's ensuing drive, a 25-yard run by running back Timmy Smith was nullified by a holding penalty on tight end Don Warren. To make matters worse, three plays later, after completing a 20-yard pass to running back Kelvin Bryant, quarterback Doug Williams slipped and twisted his back left leg while planting to make a throw and had to leave the game. Williams was untouched by the Broncos' defense before he dropped the ball while falling to the ground; referee Bob McElwee, however, blew the play dead, costing Denver a fumble recovery, along with a 22-yard fumble return touchdown by defensive end Rulon Jones. Backup quarterback Jay Schroeder was sacked for an 8-yard loss by Broncos linebacker Karl Mecklenburg on his first snap, continuing the Redskins' offensive woes. By the time the quarter ended, the Broncos had more than twice as many total yards of offense (142) as the Redskins (64).

=== Second quarter ===
Williams returned 43 seconds into the second quarter, and the Washington offense began to click. In the previous 21 Super Bowls, no team had ever overcome a 10-point deficit to win, but the second quarter took an abrupt turn in favor of the Redskins. And much like they had in the second half of Super Bowl XXI against the New York Giants, Denver's defense suffered an on-field meltdown, giving up six unanswered touchdowns to Washington, five of which were scored in the second quarter alone, and all of which were scored by the offense.

Following another Broncos punt, on the Redskins' first play of the second quarter, wide receiver Ricky Sanders got behind cornerback Mark Haynes (who tried to jam him at the line of scrimmage) and safety Tony Lilly, and caught a pass from Williams, taking it 80 yards for a touchdown, cutting Washington's deficit to 10–7. After forcing the Broncos to punt on their next possession, Washington advanced to the Denver 27 on a 19-yard run by Smith. Facing 3rd-and-1, Williams connected with receiver Gary Clark, who made a diving catch in the end zone for a 27-yard touchdown to give Washington a 14–10 lead. From this point forward, the Redskins would go on to dominate the Broncos.

After the ensuing kickoff, Denver drove to the Washington 26, aided by running back Sammy Winder's 25-yard reception and Elway's 21-yard run. But offensive tackle Dave Studdard, blocking defensive end Dexter Manley, went down with a knee injury. After Elway threw an incomplete pass on third down, Karlis missed a 43-yard field goal attempt wide left. On the first play of the Redskins' ensuing drive, Williams threw a 16-yard pass to Clark. Then on the next play, Smith took off for a 58-yard touchdown run, with blocking from guard Raleigh McKenzie and offensive tackle Joe Jacoby, increasing their lead to 21–10. Washington's offensive line featuring McKenzie and Jacoby figured greatly in a play known as the Counter Gap, which the Redskins ran repeatedly in the game.

The Redskins again forced a Broncos punt and increased their lead to 28–10 in three plays, the last two of which consisted of passes from Williams to Sanders; the first for 11 yards, and the second for a 50-yard touchdown, which made Sanders the first player in Super Bowl history to catch two touchdowns in one quarter. Three plays after the ensuing kickoff, Wilburn made up for his first quarter mistake by intercepting a pass intended for Nattiel on the Redskins 21, and once again, the Redskins stormed down the field to score. First, Smith broke loose for a 43-yard run, then Williams completed a pair of passes to Sanders for 28 yards to reach the Denver 7. Two plays later, Williams threw the fifth Washington touchdown of the quarter, an 8-yard pass to tight end Clint Didier to make the score 35–10. On Denver's next drive, Elway completed three consecutive passes for 40 total yards (including a 24-yard pass to Jackson) to advance to the Redskins 36. However, cornerback Brian Davis intercepted Elway's next pass at the 21 to end the half.

In the second quarter alone, Williams completed 9 of 11 passes for 228 yards and four touchdowns; Smith rushed five times for 122 yards and a touchdown; and Sanders caught five passes for 168 yards and two touchdowns. The Redskins scored 35 points and gained 356 yards in total offense, both Super Bowl records, and scored five touchdowns on 18 total offensive plays.

During the regular season, the Broncos had allowed 35 points for the entire game only once—and it was in that game, a 40–10 loss to the Houston Oilers in Week 4, that they fielded replacement players, with the regular players having gone on strike.

Washington's 25-point lead at the half surpassed the previous record of 20 points set by San Francisco in Super Bowl XVI and tied by Chicago in Super Bowl XX.

=== Second half ===
The Broncos' second consecutive Super Bowl appearance continued to go downhill in the second half as the Redskins shut them out for the rest of the game. On Denver's first possession of the second half, Elway was intercepted again by Wilburn. Washington then drove to the Denver 29-yard line, aided by a 15-yard run by Bryant and a 12-yard reception by Clark, but kicker Ali Haji-Sheikh's 46-yard field goal attempt hit the right upright of the goal post. On the Redskins' next possession, their only turnover of the game was recorded when Williams threw a deep pass intended for Clark that was intercepted by cornerback Jeremiah Castille at the Broncos 2-yard line. Elway then managed to escape a safety by completing a 10-yard pass to Jackson from his own end zone. After another punt by the Broncos, Clark delivered a 25-yard run on a reverse to start the Redskins' next possession and end the third quarter.

Clark's run was the start of a four-play, 68-yard scoring drive, which also featured three runs by Smith for 43 yards, the last one being a 4-yard touchdown run to bring the game to its final score of 42–10. On the Broncos' next possession, Elway appeared to complete a 33-yard pass to wide receiver Vance Johnson on 4th-and-17, but this was nullified by a holding penalty on center Mike Freeman, bringing up 4th-and-27, and forcing yet another Denver punt. Washington then reached the Denver 13 to run out the clock and win the game.

By the end of the game, Elway was sacked five times and threw three interceptions. Smith finished the game with a Super Bowl record 204 rushing yards, and scored two touchdowns. Sanders caught nine passes for 193 yards and two touchdowns, and returned three kickoffs for 46 yards. His 193 receiving yards and his 235 total offensive yards were both Super Bowl records, and his 80-yard touchdown reception in the second quarter also tied a Super Bowl record. Clark caught three passes for 55 yards and a touchdown, while also rushing once for 25 yards. Wilburn recorded two interceptions, while Walton had two sacks. Meanwhile, running back Gene Lang was the Broncos' leading rusher, with only 38 yards on five carries. Elway finished the game with 14 out of 38 pass completions for 257 yards, one touchdown, and three interceptions. He was also Denver's second-leading rusher with 32 yards on three carries; this was the only Super Bowl in which Elway played without scoring a rushing touchdown. Jackson was Denver's top receiver with four catches for 76 yards.

In 2015, on the occasion of Super Bowl 50, Slate writer Justin Peters watched all the games over a two-month period. He considered Super Bowl XXII to be the best Super Bowl ever, declaring it was, "The most significant Super Bowl ever played. The most unlikely comeback from the most unlikely quarterback, Doug Williams, who led his team to score 35 points in the second quarter: a single-quarter Super Bowl scoring record that still stands!"

=== Box score ===
Super Bowl XXII: Washington Redskins 42, Denver Broncos 10

Quarter	1	2	3	4	Total
Redskins (NFC)	0	35	0	7	42
Broncos (AFC)	10	0	0	0	10

at Jack Murphy Stadium, San Diego, California

- Date: January 31, 1988
- Game time: 3:20 p.m. PST
- Game weather: 61 °F (16 °C), partly cloudy

Scoring summary

Quarter	Time	Drive			Team	Scoring information	Score	
Quarter	Time	Plays	Yards	TOP	Team	Scoring information	WAS	DEN
1	13:03	1	56	0:08	DEN	Ricky Nattiel 56-yard touchdown reception from John Elway, Rich Karlis kick good	0	7
1	9:09	7	61	2:05	DEN	24-yard field goal by Karlis	0	10
2	14:07	1	80	0:10	WAS	Ricky Sanders 80-yard touchdown reception from Doug Williams, Ali Haji-Sheikh kick good	7	10
2	10:15	5	64	2:44	WAS	Gary Clark 27-yard touchdown reception from Williams, Haji-Sheikh kick good	14	10
2	6:27	2	74	0:51	WAS	Timmy Smith 58-yard touchdown run, Haji-Sheikh kick good	21	10
2	3:42	3	60	0:52	WAS	Sanders 50-yard touchdown reception from Williams, Haji-Sheikh kick good	28	10
2	1:04	7	79	1:10	WAS	Clint Didier 8-yard touchdown reception from Williams, Haji-Sheikh kick good	35	10
4	13:09	4	68	2:03	WAS	Smith 4-yard touchdown run, Haji-Sheikh kick good	42	10
"TOP" = time of possession. For other American football terms, see Glossary of American football.							42	10

== Final statistics ==
Sources: NFL.com Super Bowl XXII, Super Bowl XXII Play Finder Was, Super Bowl XXII Play Finder Den

=== Statistical comparison ===
	Washington Redskins	Denver Broncos
First downs	25	18
First downs rushing	13	6
First downs passing	11	10
First downs penalty	1	2
Third down efficiency	9/15	2/12
Fourth down efficiency	0/0	0/0
Net yards rushing	280	97
Rushing attempts	40	17
Yards per rush	7.0	5.7
Passing – Completions/attempts	18/30	15/39
Times sacked-total yards	2–18	5–50
Interceptions thrown	1	3
Net yards passing	322	230
Total net yards	602	327
Punt returns-total yards	1–0	2–18
Kickoff returns-total yards	3–46	5–88
Interceptions-total return yards	3–11	1–0
Punts-average yardage	4–37.5	7–36.1
Fumbles-lost	1–0	0–0
Penalties-total yards	6–65	5–26
Time of possession	33:15	26:45
Turnovers	1	3

=== Individual statistics ===
Redskins passing
	C/ATT^{1}	Yds	TD	INT	Rating
Doug Williams	18/29	340	4	1	127.9
Jay Schroeder	0/1	0	0	0	39.6
Redskins rushing
	Car^{2}	Yds	TD	LG^{3}	Yds/Car
Timmy Smith	22	204	2	58	9.27
Kelvin Bryant	8	38	0	15	4.75
Gary Clark	1	25	0	25	25.00
George Rogers	5	17	0	5	3.40
Keith Griffin	1	2	0	2	2.00
Doug Williams	2	–2	0	1	–1.00
Ricky Sanders	1	–4	0	–4	–4.00
Redskins receiving
	Rec^{4}	Yds	TD	LG^{3}	Target^{5}
Ricky Sanders	9	193	2	80	11
Gary Clark	3	55	1	27	9
Don Warren	2	15	0	9	4
Art Monk	1	40	0	40	1
Kelvin Bryant	1	20	0	20	3
Timmy Smith	1	9	0	9	1
Clint Didier	1	8	1	8	1

Broncos passing
	C/ATT^{1}	Yds	TD	INT	Rating
John Elway	14/38	257	1	3	36.8
Steve Sewell	1/1	23	0	0	118.8
Broncos rushing
	Car^{2}	Yds	TD	LG^{3}	Yds/Car
Gene Lang	5	38	0	13	7.60
John Elway	3	32	0	21	10.67
Sammy Winder	8	30	0	13	3.75
Steve Sewell	1	–3	0	–3	–3.00
Broncos receiving
	Rec^{4}	Yds	TD	LG^{3}	Target^{5}
Mark Jackson	4	76	0	32	6
Steve Sewell	4	41	0	18	9
Ricky Nattiel	2	69	1	56	11
Clarence Kay	2	38	0	27	3
Sammy Winder	1	26	0	26	3
John Elway	1	23	0	23	1
Gene Lang	1	7	0	7	2
Vance Johnson	0	0	0	0	3
Tony Boddie	0	0	0	0	1

^{1}Completions/attempts ^{2}Carries ^{3}Long gain ^{4}Receptions ^{5}Times targeted

=== Records set ===
The following records were set in Super Bowl XXII, according to the official NFL.com boxscore and the ProFootball reference.com game summary.

Player records set
Most passing yards, game	340	Doug Williams (Washington)
Most touchdown passes, half	4	Doug Williams (Washington)
Most touchdown passes, quarter	4	Doug Williams (Washington)
Most rushing yards, game	204	Timmy Smith (Washington)
Most receiving yards, game	193	Ricky Sanders (Washington)
Most combined^{†} yardage gained, game	235	Ricky Sanders (Washington)
Most (one point) extra points, game	6	Ali Haji-Sheikh (Washington)
Records tied
Longest pass	80 yards (TD)	Doug Williams (Washington)
Most touchdown passes, game	4	Doug Williams (Washington)
Most rushing touchdowns, game	2	Timmy Smith (Washington)
Longest Reception	80 yards (TD)	Ricky Sanders (Washington)
Most receiving touchdowns, game	2	Ricky Sanders (Washington)
Most kickoff returns, career	8	Ken Bell (Denver)
Most field goals attempted, career	6	Rich Karlis (Denver)

- † Combined yardage category includes rushing, receiving, interception returns, punt returns, kickoff returns, and fumble returns.

Team records set
Most points scored, first half	35	Redskins
Most points scored in any quarter of play	35 (2nd)	Redskins
Most points, second quarter	35	Redskins
Largest halftime margin	25 points	Redskins
Largest deficit a team overcame to win	10 points	Redskins
Most touchdowns, quarter	5	Redskins
Most touchdowns, game	6	Redskins
Most (one point) PATs, game	6	Redskins
Most net yards, rushing and passing	602	Redskins
Most rushing yards (net)	280	Redskins
Total offensive yards in a quarter	356	Redskins
Records tied
Most passing touchdowns	4	Redskins
Most consecutive Super Bowl losses	2	Broncos
Fewest rushing touchdowns	0	Broncos
Fewest points, second half	0	Broncos

Records set, both team totals
	Total	Redskins	Broncos
Most points scored, first half	45	35	10
Most points, second quarter	35	35	0
Fewest points scored, second half	7	7	0
Most net yards, rushing and passing	929	602	327
Most rushing yards (net)	377	280	97
Records tied, both team totals
Fewest fumbles lost	0	0	0

== Starting lineups ==
Hall of Fame‡

Washington	Position	Position	Denver
Offense
Gary Clark	WR		Mark Jackson
Joe Jacoby	LT		Dave Studdard
Raleigh McKenzie	LG		Keith Bishop
Darrick Brilz	C		Mike Freeman
R. C. Thielemann	RG		Stefan Humphries
Mark May	RT		Ken Lanier
Clint Didier	TE		Clarence Kay
Ricky Sanders	WR		Ricky Nattiel
Doug Williams	QB		John Elway‡
Don Warren	TE	FB	Gene Lang
Timmy Smith	RB		Sammy Winder
Defense
Charles Mann	LE		Andre Townsend
Dave Butz	LT	NT	Greg Kragen
Darryl Grant	RT	RE	Rulon Jones
Dexter Manley	RE	LOLB	Simon Fletcher
Mel Kaufman	LLB	LILB	Karl Mecklenburg
Neal Olkewicz	MLB	RILB	Ricky Hunley
Monte Coleman	RLB	ROLB	Jim Ryan
Darrell Green‡	LCB		Mark Haynes
Barry Wilburn	RCB		Steve Wilson
Alvin Walton	SS		Dennis Smith
Todd Bowles	FS		Tony Lilly

== Officials ==
- Referee: Bob McElwee #95 first Super Bowl on field; alternate for XVII
- Umpire: Al Conway #27 fourth Super Bowl (IX, XIV, XVI)
- Head linesman: Dale Hamer #104 second Super Bowl (XVII); alternate referee for XXVII
- Line judge: Jack Fette #39 fifth Super Bowl (V, VIII, X, XIII)
- Back judge: Al Jury #106 second Super Bowl (XX)
- Side judge: Don Wedge #28 first Super Bowl
- Field judge: Johnny Grier #23 first and only Super Bowl
- Alternate referee: Jerry Markbreit #9 alternate for XIX; four Super Bowls (XVII, XXI, XXVI, XXIX) on field
- Alternate umpire: Ben Montgomery #117 worked two Super Bowls on field as a line judge (XXXII & XXXVIII)

Following this game, Johnny Grier was promoted to referee, becoming the first African-American to lead an NFL officiating crew.

In addition to Grier, Dale Hamer was promoted to referee in 1989. Don Wedge was a referee from 1976 to 1978 before becoming a side judge in 1979 (he was a back judge from 1972 to 1975).

Jack Fette retired following this game and became a replay official. He was the second official, after Tom Kelleher, to officiate in five Super Bowls.
