= Mark May =

American football player and broadcaster (born 1959)

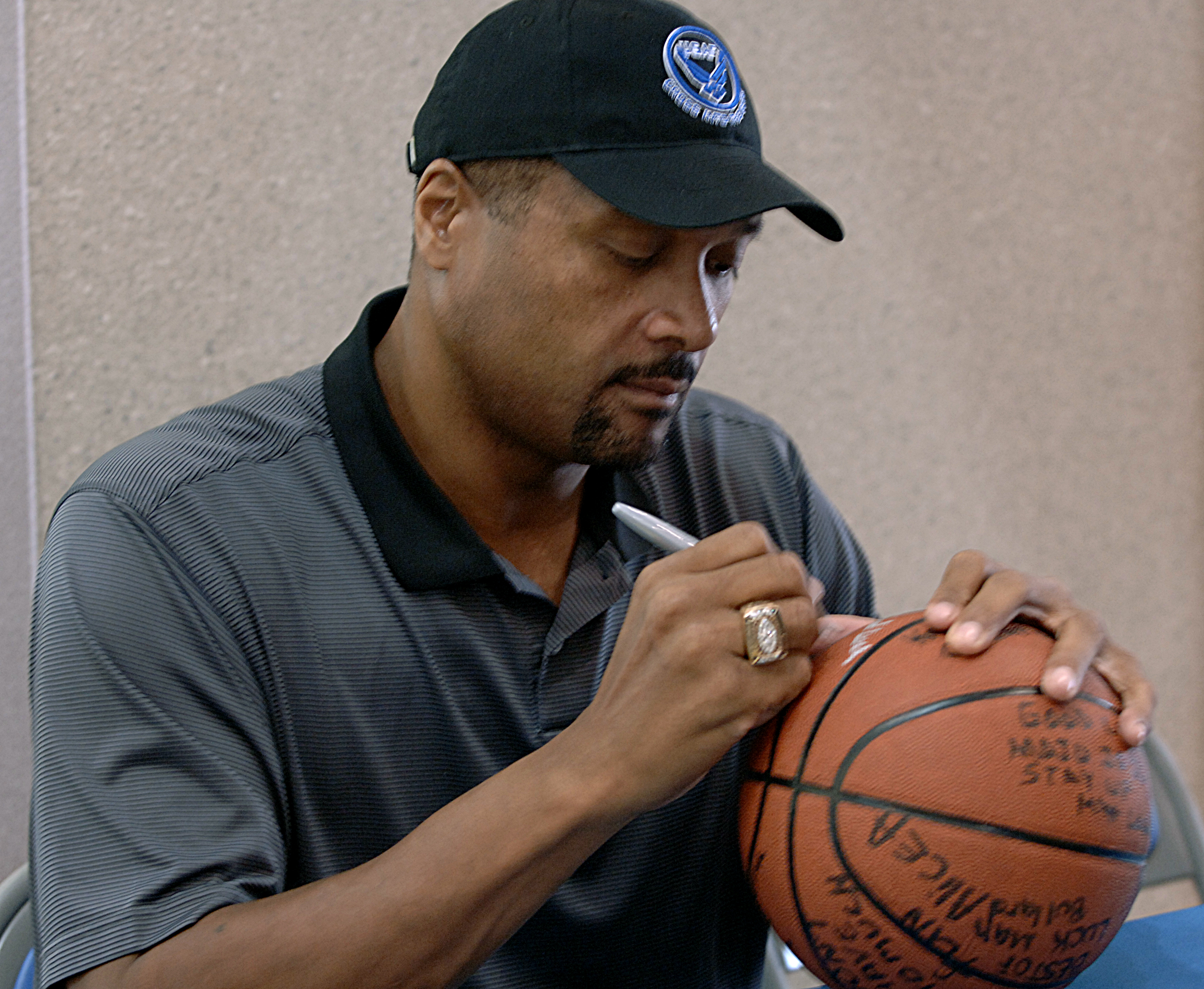
- May in 2007

No. 73
- Position: Guard

Personal information
- Born: November 2, 1959 (age 67); Oneonta, New York, U.S.
- Listed height: 6 ft 6 in (1.98 m)
- Listed weight: 288 lb (131 kg)

Career information
- High school: Oneonta
- College: Pittsburgh
- NFL draft: 1981: 1st round, 20th overall pick

Career history
- Washington Redskins (1981–1990); San Diego Chargers (1991); Phoenix Cardinals (1992–1993)

Awards and highlights
- 2× Super Bowl champion (XVII, XXII); Pro Bowl (1988); 80 Greatest Redskins; Outland Trophy (1980); Unanimous All-American (1980); 2× First-team All-East (1979, 1980); Pittsburgh Panthers No. 73 retired

Career NFL statistics
- Games played: 158
- Games started: 141
- Fumble recoveries: 7
- Stats at Pro Football Reference
- College Football Hall of Fame

Mark Eric May (born November 2, 1959) is an American former professional football player who was a guard for 13 seasons in the National Football League (NFL) during the 1980s and 1990s. May played college football for the Pittsburgh Panthers and earned unanimous All-American honors. He was selected in the first round of the 1981 NFL draft, and played professionally for the Washington Redskins, San Diego Chargers, and Arizona Cardinals.

May became involved in broadcasting following his retirement from the NFL in 1993. Most notably, he was employed by ESPN between 2001 and 2017.

== Early life and college ==
At Oneonta High School in Oneonta, New York, May earned eight varsity letters in football, basketball, and track. He was inducted into the school's Athletic Hall of Fame in October 2007.

May attended the University of Pittsburgh, where he played for the Pittsburgh Panthers football team from 1977 to 1980. As a senior in 1980, he was a unanimous first-team All-American and received the Outland Trophy as the nation's top collegiate interior lineman. As a part of the 1980 Pittsburgh Panthers football team, he played with future NFL players Dan Marino, Dwight Collins, Rickey Jackson, Russ Grimm, Jimbo Covert, Bill Maas, Hugh Green, and Tim Lewis. As a junior and a senior, May did not allow even one quarterback sack. He earned the nickname "May Day" for "wreaking havoc on the opposing defensive ends." After his senior season, May played in the Hula Bowl and Japan Bowl all-star games.

Under the tutelage of head coach Jackie Sherrill, May and his teammates led Pitt to a 39–8–1 four-year record, which included three top-10 finishes and four bowl games. The university retired May's jersey number (73) in 2001, and May became the eighth Pitt player to be so honored. He was inducted into the College Football Hall of Fame in 2005, becoming the 23rd Pitt player or coach to earn the honor.

In 1981, May donated $10,000 to Pitt's alumni sports fund to give back to the university.

== Professional career ==
The Washington Redskins drafted May with the 20th pick of the first round of the 1981 NFL Draft, and he played guard for the Redskins from 1981 to 1990. He was a member of the famed "Hogs" offensive line, which was instrumental in the Redskins' victories in Super Bowl XVII and XXII (though May was injured for Super Bowl XVII). He was named one of the 70 greatest Redskins of all time. May started 115 games for the Redskins. He missed the 1990 season due to a knee injury.

Following his tenure with the Redskins, May became a Plan B free agent. He signed with the San Diego Chargers, playing as Dave Richards' backup during the 1991 season. He later played for the Phoenix Cardinals (1992–93), where he reunited with Joe Bugel, the Redskins' offensive line coach from 1981 to 1989, before his retirement in 1993.

For three years during the offseason, May took classes and sold cars at a Ford dealership.

In 1983, he co-wrote "Mark May's Hog Cookbook" which features recipes like "Hog Balls" (a mixture of pork sausage and cheddar cheese) and "Aunt Jeannette's Sweet Potato Pie." The last entry is for "Hog Quiche" (which reads, simply, "Hogs don't eat quiche").

In 2005, he co-wrote with author and close friend Dan O'Brien Mark May's Tales from the Washington Redskins, a book detailing his experiences with the Washington Redskins.

== Broadcasting career ==
In 1994, May served as a color commentator for University of Pittsburgh football games for WTAE Radio in Pittsburgh. In 1995, he was hired by TNT as a studio analyst on its Sunday Night Football broadcasts. In 1997, May became a game analyst for the Sunday Night Football broadcasts on TNT. After TNT lost the broadcasting rights to Sunday Night Football following the 1997 season, May joined CBS Sports in 1998 as a game analyst for its NFL coverage from 1998 to 2001. He also spent the 2000 season calling Arena Football League games on the original TNN Cable Network alongside Eli Gold and Jill Arrington, which culminated with the inaugural af2 Arena Cup in 2000 between the Tennessee Valley Vipers and the Quad City Steamwheelers.

In 2001, May joined ESPN as a football analyst and commentator on college football. Along with Lou Holtz, he was a regular on the popular College Football Scoreboard and College Football Final as well as appearing on pregame, halftime, and postgame coverage during the season, and on College Football Live in the off-season, and offers analysis on ESPN2 and ESPNews. He was also present in the NFL Live studio throughout the entire 2007 NFL draft. While not a regular game analyst, he does occasionally broadcast games, as he did for ESPN's coverage of the 2011 Poinsettia Bowl.

On June 1, 2015, ESPN announced that May would be leaving College Football Final and moved to another show on one of the other ESPN Networks. He was replaced by Joey Galloway.

== Personal life ==
In 2001, May resided in San Diego, California and Ocean City, Maryland. He has a wife named Kathy and two daughters, Abra and Bryce.

== Legal troubles ==
In January 1979, as a sophomore at Pitt, May was arrested for disorderly conduct, resisting arrest, criminal mischief, inciting a riot, and making terroristic threats. May reportedly was jumping on top of parked cars, threatening police officers and encouraging a crowd of onlookers to fight the officers. He was found guilty of criminal mischief and disorderly conduct, while the other charges were dismissed.

As a member of the Redskins, May was twice arrested for DUI. The first instance occurred in 1985 in Arlington, Virginia, and the second instance in March 1990.
