= List of Super Bowl records =

This is a list of Super Bowl records. The list of records is separated by individual players and teams. Players and teams, along with their records, are noted with the Super Bowl game played. All records can be referenced at the National Football League (NFL)'s official website, NFL.com.

== Individual player records ==
A complete list of Super Bowl records can be found in the 2025 Official NFL Record & Fact Book beginning at page 675. Records can also be found at Pro-Football-Reference.com.

=== Service ===
- Most Super Bowl wins: 7
  - Tom Brady – QB
    - Patriots (XXXVI, XXXVIII, XXXIX, XLIX, LI, LIII)
    - Buccaneers (LV)
- Most Super Bowl MVP awards: 5
  - Tom Brady – QB
    - Patriots (XXXVI, XXXVIII, XLIX, LI)
    - Buccaneers (LV)
- Most losses: 5
  - Glenn Parker – OL
    - Bills (XXV, XXVI, XXVII, XXVIII)
    - Giants (XXXV)
  - Cornelius Bennett – LB
    - Bills (XXV, XXVI, XXVII, XXVIII)
    - Falcons (XXXIII)
  - Gale Gilbert – QB
    - Bills (XXV, XXVI, XXVII, XXVIII)
    - Chargers (XXIX)
- Most consecutive championships: 3
  - Ken Norton Jr. – LB
    - Cowboys (XXVII, XXVIII)
    - 49ers (XXIX)
  - Darian Kinnard – OT
    - Chiefs (LVII, LVIII)
    - Eagles (LIX)
- Back to back championships with different teams
  - Ken Norton Jr. – LB
    - Cowboys (XXVII, XXVIII)
    - 49ers (XXIX)
  - Deion Sanders – CB
    - 49ers (XXIX)
    - Cowboys (XXX)
  - Derrick Martin – S
    - Packers (XLV)
    - Giants (XLVI)
  - Brandon Browner – CB
    - Seahawks (XLVIII)
    - Patriots (XLIX)
  - Darius Kilgo – DT
    - Broncos (50)
    - Patriots (LI)
  - Chris Long – DE
    - Patriots (LI)
    - Eagles (LII)
  - LeGarrette Blount – RB
    - Patriots (LI)
    - Eagles (LII)
  - LeSean McCoy – RB
    - Chiefs (LIV)
    - Buccaneers (LV)
  - Kendall Blanton – TE
    - Rams (LVI)
    - Chiefs (LVII)
  - Darian Kinnard – OT
    - Chiefs (LVII, LVIII)
    - Eagles (LIX)
- Win a Super Bowl in three different decades
  - Tom Brady – QB
    - 2000s: Patriots (XXXVI, XXXVIII, XXXIX)
    - 2010s: Patriots (XLIX, LI, LIII)
    - 2020s: Buccaneers (LV)
- Win a Super Bowl with one team and then defeat that same team in the Super Bowl the following season
  - Brandon Browner – CB
    - Seahawks (XLVIII)
    - Patriots (XLIX)
  - Chris Long – DE
    - Patriots (LI)
    - Eagles (LII)
  - LeGarrette Blount – RB
    - Patriots (LI)
    - Eagles (LII)
  - LeSean McCoy – RB
    - Chiefs (LIV)
    - Buccaneers (LV)
  - Darian Kinnard – OT
    - Chiefs (LVII, LVIII)
    - Eagles (LIX)
- Longest time span between Super Bowl championships as a player: 12 seasons
  - Ray Lewis – LB
    - Baltimore Ravens (XXXV, XLVII)
- Most appearances as either a player or coach: 12
  - Bill Belichick
    - Giants – Assistant coach (XXI, XXV)
    - Patriots – Assistant coach (XXXI)
    - Patriots – Head coach (XXXVI, XXXVIII, XXXIX, XLII, XLVI, XLIX, LI, LII, LIII)
- Most games played: 10
  - Tom Brady – QB
    - Patriots (XXXVI, XXXVIII, XXXIX, XLII, XLVI, XLIX, LI, LII, LIII)
    - Buccaneers (LV)
- Most games started: 10
  - Tom Brady – QB
    - Patriots (XXXVI, XXXVIII, XXXIX, XLII, XLVI, XLIX, LI, LII, LIII)
    - Buccaneers (LV)
- Most consecutive appearances: 5
  - Gale Gilbert – QB
    - Bills (XXV, XXVI, XXVII, XXVIII)
    - Chargers (XXIX)
- Most starts as quarterback: 10
  - Tom Brady
    - Patriots (XXXVI, XXXVIII, XXXIX, XLII, XLVI, XLIX, LI, LII, LIII)
    - Buccaneers (LV)
- Most wins as starting quarterback: 7
  - Tom Brady
    - Patriots (XXXVI, XXXVIII, XXXIX, XLIX, LI, LIII)
    - Buccaneers (LV)
- Wins as starting quarterback for two different teams
  - Peyton Manning
    - Colts (XLI)
    - Broncos (50)
  - Tom Brady
    - Patriots (XXXVI, XXXVIII, XXXIX, XLIX, LI, LIII)
    - Buccaneers (LV)
- Most games as a kicker: 6
  - Stephen Gostkowski
    - Patriots (XLII, XLVI, XLIX, LI, LII, LIII)
- Most wins as a kicker: 4
  - Adam Vinatieri
    - Patriots (XXXVI, XXXVIII, XXXIX)
    - Colts (XLI)
- Oldest player: 43 years, 199 days
  - Tom Brady – QB
    - Buccaneers (LV)
- Youngest player to start: 21 years, 322 days
  - Bryan Bulaga – OL
    - Packers (XLV)
- Players to both throw and catch a touchdown pass in one game
  - Nick Foles QB
    - Eagles (LII)
  - Jauan Jennings WR
    - San Francisco 49ers (LVIII)
- Oldest quarterback to start and to win: 43 years 199 days
  - Tom Brady
    - Buccaneers (LV)
- Youngest quarterback to start and to win: 23 years and 340 days
  - Ben Roethlisberger
    - Steelers (XL)

=== Scoring ===
- Most points scored, career, 48

- Jerry Rice – San Francisco XXIII, XXIV, XXIX, and Oakland XXXVII

- Most points scored, single game, 20

- James White – New England vs. Atlanta, LI – 3 TD, 1 (2-point) conversion
- Jalen Hurts – Philadelphia vs. Kansas City, LVII – 3 TD, 1 (2-point) conversion

- Longest scoring play, 108 yard kickoff return

- Jacoby Jones – Baltimore vs. San Francisco, XLVII

- Most kicking points, game, 17

- Jason Myers (5-FG, 2 extra points) – Seattle vs. New England, LX

=== Touchdowns ===
In this category R = rushing touchdown (TD); P = pass reception TD; KR = kickoff return TD

- Most touchdowns, career, 8

- Jerry Rice – San Francisco XXIII, XXIV, XXIX, and Oakland XXXVII (8-P)

- Most touchdowns, QB-receiver tandem, career, 5

- Tom Brady-Rob Gronkowski – New England XLVI, XLIX, LII, LIII, and Tampa Bay LV

- Most touchdowns, single game, 3 (accomplished seven times by six players)

- Roger Craig – San Francisco vs. Miami, XIX (1-R, 2-P)
- Jerry Rice – San Francisco vs. Denver, XXIV (3-P)
- Jerry Rice – San Francisco vs. San Diego, XXIX (3-P)
- Ricky Watters – San Francisco vs. San Diego, XXIX (1-R, 2-P)
- Terrell Davis – Denver vs. Green Bay, XXXII (3-R)
- James White – New England vs. Atlanta, LI (2-R, 1-P)
- Jalen Hurts – Philadelphia vs. Kansas City, LVII (3-R)

- Most touchdowns, single quarter, 2

- Dan Ross – Cincinnati vs. San Francisco, XVI (2-P)
- Marcus Allen – Los Angeles Raiders vs. Washington, XVIII (2-R)
- Roger Craig – San Francisco vs. Miami, XIX (1-R, 1-P)
- Ricky Sanders – Washington vs. Denver, XXII (2-P)
- Michael Irvin – Dallas vs. Buffalo, XXVII (2-P)
- Larry Fitzgerald – Arizona vs. Pittsburgh, XLIII (2-P)
- Damien Williams – Kansas City vs. San Francisco, LIV (1-R, 1-P)

- Most touchdowns, plays of 50 or more yards, game, 2

- Ricky Sanders – Washington vs. Denver, XXII (2-P)
- Jacoby Jones – Baltimore Ravens vs. San Francisco, XLVII (1-P, 1-KR)

- Touchdowns scored for two different teams, 4 players

- Jerry Rice – San Francisco XXIII, Oakland XXXVII
- Ricky Proehl – St. Louis Rams XXXVI, Carolina XXXVIII
- Muhsin Muhammad – Carolina XXXVIII, Chicago XLI
- Rob Gronkowski – New England XLIX, LII; Tampa Bay LV

- Longest play, 108 yards

- Jacoby Jones – KR, Baltimore Ravens vs. San Francisco, XLVII

=== Passing ===
- Highest passer rating, career (40 attempts), 127.83

- Joe Montana – 4 games, San Francisco XVI, XIX, XXIII, XXIV

- Highest passer rating, game, 150.92

- Phil Simms – New York Giants vs. Denver, XXI

- Lowest passer rating to win game, 22.6

- Ben Roethlisberger – Pittsburgh vs. Seattle, XL

- Most touchdown passes, career, 21

- Tom Brady – 10 games, New England XXXVI, XXXVIII, XXXIX, XLII, XLVI, XLIX, LI, LII, LIII; Tampa Bay LV

- Most touchdown passes, half, 4

- Doug Williams, first half – Washington vs. Denver, XXII
- Steve Young, first half – San Francisco vs. San Diego, XXIX

- Most touchdown passes, quarter, 4 (second)

- Doug Williams – Washington vs. Denver, XXII

- Most touchdown passes, game, 6

- Steve Young – San Francisco vs. San Diego, XXIX

- Lowest percentage, passes had intercepted, career (40 attempts), 0.00%

- Jim Plunkett, Oakland/Los Angeles Raiders, 2 games (46–0), XV, XVIII
- Joe Montana, San Francisco, 4 games (122–0), XVI, XIX, XXIII, XXIV

- Most attempts, career, 421

- Tom Brady – 10 games, New England XXXVI, XXXVIII, XXXIX, XLII, XLVI, XLIX, LI, LII, LIII; Tampa Bay LV

- Most attempts, game, 62

- Tom Brady – New England vs Atlanta, LI

- Fewest attempts by winning QB, game, 7

- Bob Griese – Miami vs. Minnesota, VIII

- Most completions, career, 277

- Tom Brady – 10 games, New England XXXVI, XXXVIII, XXXIX, XLII, XLVI, XLIX, LI, LII, LIII; Tampa Bay LV

- Most completions to start a game, 9

- Eli Manning – New York Giants vs. New England, XLVI

- Most consecutive completions, game, 16

- Tom Brady – New England vs. New York Giants, XLVI

- Most completions, game, 43

- Tom Brady – New England vs. Atlanta, LI

- Most completions, both quarterbacks, 63

- Drew Brees – New Orleans (32) vs. Peyton Manning – Indianapolis (31), XLIV

- Fewest completions by winning QB, game, 6

- Bob Griese – Miami vs. Minnesota, VIII

- Highest completion percentage, career (40 attempts), 73.33%

- Jalen Hurts – Philadelphia, 2 games (44-60) LVII, LIX

- Highest completion percentage, game (20 attempts), 88%

- Phil Simms – New York Giants vs. Denver, XXI (22-25)

- Highest completion percentage, both teams, 75% (84–63)

- Drew Brees, New Orleans vs. Peyton Manning, Indianapolis XLIV

- Most passing yards, career, 3,039

- Tom Brady – 10 games, New England XXXVI, XXXVIII, XXXIX, XLII, XLVI, XLIX, LI, LII, LIII; Tampa Bay LV

- Most passing yards, game, 505

- Tom Brady – New England vs. Philadelphia, LII

- Most passing yards, quarter, 235 (fourth)

- Drake Maye – New England vs. Seattle, LX

- Longest pass, 85 yards (TD)

- Jake Delhomme (to Muhsin Muhammad) – Carolina vs. New England, XXXVIII

- Fewest passing yards by a Super Bowl MVP, 119

- Roger Staubach – Dallas vs. Miami, VI

- Highest average gain, career (40 attempts), 11.10 yards

- Terry Bradshaw – Pittsburgh, 4 games (84–932), IX, X, XIII, XIV

- Highest average gain, game (20 attempts), 14.71 yards

- Terry Bradshaw – Pittsburgh vs. Los Angeles Rams, XIV (21–309)

- Most attempts, without interception, game, 48

- Tom Brady – New England vs. New York Giants, XLII, New England vs. Philadelphia Eagles, LII

- Most interceptions thrown, career, 8

- John Elway – Denver, 5 games, XXI, XXII, XXIV, XXXII, XXXIII

- Most interceptions thrown, game, 5

- Rich Gannon – Oakland vs. Tampa Bay, XXXVII

=== Rushing ===
- Most attempts, career, 101

- Franco Harris – Pittsburgh IX, X, XIII, and XIV

- Most attempts, game, 38

- John Riggins – Washington vs. Miami, XVII

- Most rushing yards, career, 354

- Franco Harris – Pittsburgh IX, X, XIII, and XIV

- Most rushing yards, career, quarterback, 197

- Patrick Mahomes – Kansas City

- Most rushing yards, game, 204

- Timmy Smith – Washington vs. Denver, XXII

- Longest run from scrimmage, 75 yards (TD)

- Willie Parker – Pittsburgh vs. Seattle, XL

- Most rushing touchdowns, career, 5

- Emmitt Smith – Dallas XXVII, XXVIII, and XXX

- Most rushing touchdowns, career, quarterback, 4

- John Elway – Denver, 5 games, XXI, XXII, XXIV, XXXII, XXXIII
- Jalen Hurts – Philadelphia, 2 games, LVII, LIX

- Most rushing touchdowns, game, 3

- Terrell Davis – Denver vs. Green Bay, XXXII
- Jalen Hurts – Philadelphia vs. Kansas City, LVII

- Highest average gain, career (20 attempts), 9.6 yards

- Marcus Allen – Los Angeles Raiders, 1 game (20–191) XVIII

- Highest average gain, game (10 attempts), 10.5 yards

- Tom Matte – Baltimore Colts vs. New York Jets, III (11–116)

- Longest touchdown Run, quarterback, 15 yards

- Colin Kaepernick – San Francisco vs. Baltimore Ravens, XLVII

- Most rushing yards, game, quarterback, 72 yards

- Jalen Hurts – Philadelphia vs. Kansas City, LIX

- Most rushing yards, game, wide receiver, 53 yards

- Deebo Samuel – San Francisco vs. Kansas City LIV

=== Receiving ===
- Most receptions, career, 35

- Travis Kelce – Kansas City LIV, LV, LVII, LVIII, LIX

- Most receptions, game, 14

- James White – New England vs. Atlanta, LI

- Most receiving yards, career, 589

- Jerry Rice – San Francisco XXIII, XXIV, XXIX; Oakland XXXVII

- Most receiving yards, game, 215

- Jerry Rice – San Francisco vs. Cincinnati, XXIII

- Most receiving yards, game, tight end, 133

- Travis Kelce – Kansas City vs. Tampa Bay, LV

- Most receiving yards, game, running back, 110

- James White – New England vs. Atlanta, LI

- Longest reception, 85 yards (TD)

- Muhsin Muhammad – (from Delhomme), Carolina vs. New England, XXXVIII (TD)

- Highest average gain, career (8 receptions), 24.4 yards

- John Stallworth – Pittsburgh, 4 games (11–268)

- Highest average gain, game (3 receptions), 40.33 yards

- John Stallworth – Pittsburgh vs. Los Angeles Rams, XIV (3–121)

- Most receiving touchdowns, career, 8

- Jerry Rice – San Francisco XXIII, XXIV, XXIX; Oakland XXXVII

- Most receiving touchdowns, game, 3

- Jerry Rice – San Francisco vs. Denver, XXIV
- Jerry Rice – San Francisco vs. San Diego, XXIX

- Most receiving touchdowns, game, quarterback, 1

- Nick Foles – New England vs. Philadelphia, LII

=== Combined yardage ===
This category includes rushing, receiving, interception returns, punt returns, kickoff returns, and fumble returns.

- Most attempts, career, 108

- Franco Harris – Pittsburgh, 4 games IX, X, XIII, XIV

- Most attempts, game, 39

- John Riggins – Washington vs. Miami, XVII

- Most yards gained, career, 604

- Jerry Rice – 4 games San Francisco XXIII, XXIV, XXIX; Oakland XXXVII

- Most yards gained, game, 290

- Jacoby Jones – Baltimore Ravens vs. San Francisco, XLVII

=== Fumbles ===
- Most fumbles, career, 6

- Patrick Mahomes, Kansas City, 5 games LIV, LV, LVII, LVIII, LIX

- Most fumbles, game, 3

- Roger Staubach – Dallas vs. Pittsburgh, X
- Jim Kelly – Buffalo vs. Washington, XXVI
- Frank Reich – Buffalo vs. Dallas, XXVII

- Most fumbles recovered, career, 5

- Patrick Mahomes, Kansas City, 5 games (5 own)

- Most fumbles recovered, game, 2

- Jake Scott – Miami vs. Minnesota, VIII (1 own, 1 opponent)
- Roger Staubach – Dallas vs. Pittsburgh, X (2 own)
- Randy Hughes – Dallas vs. Denver, XII (2 opponent)
- Butch Johnson – Dallas vs. Denver, XII (2 own)
- Mike Singletary – Chicago vs. New England, XX (2 opponent)
- Jimmie Jones – Dallas vs. Buffalo, XXVII (2 opponent)
- Danny Trevathan – Denver vs. Carolina, 50 (1 own, 1 opponent)

- Most fumble return yards, game, 64 yards

- Leon Lett – Dallas vs. Buffalo, XXVII

- Longest fumble return, 64 yards

- Leon Lett – Dallas vs. Buffalo, XXVII

- Most fumble returns for touchdowns, game, 1

- Mike Bass – Washington vs. Miami, VII (opponent 49 yards)
- Mike Hegman – Dallas vs. Pittsburgh, XIII (opponent 37 yards)
- Jimmie Jones – Dallas vs. Buffalo, XXVII (opponent 2 yards)
- Ken Norton, Jr. – Dallas vs. Buffalo, XXVII (opponent 9 yards)
- James Washington – Dallas vs. Buffalo, XXVIII (opponent 46 yards)
- Malik Jackson – Denver vs. Carolina, 50 (opponent end zone)
- Nick Bolton – Kansas City vs Philadelphia, LVII (opponent 36 yards)

=== Defense ===
- Most interceptions, career, 3

- Chuck Howley – Dallas 2 games, V, VI
- Rod Martin – Oakland/Los Angeles Raiders 2 games XV, XVIII
- Larry Brown – Dallas 3 games XXVII, XXVIII, XXX

- Most interceptions, game, 3

- Rod Martin – Oakland vs. Philadelphia, XV

- Most interception yards gained, career, 108

- Darrien Gordon – San Diego XXIX, Denver XXXII, XXXIII, Oakland XXXVII

- Most interception yards gained, game, 108

- Darrien Gordon – Denver vs. Atlanta, XXXIII

- Longest interception return, 100 yards, TD

- James Harrison – Pittsburgh vs. Arizona, XLIII

- Most interceptions returned for a touchdown, game, 2

- Dwight Smith – Tampa Bay vs. Oakland, XXXVII

- Most solo tackles plus assists, game, 18 (11 tackles, 7 assists)

- Dan Morgan – Carolina vs. New England, XXXVIII

- Most solo tackles plus assists, career, 34 (30 tackles, 4 assists)
  - Rodney Harrison – DB
    - Chargers (XXIX)
    - Patriots (XXXVIII, XXXIX, XLII)
- Most sacks, career, 5

(Sacks an official statistic since XVII by the NFL, sacks for all games shown by Pro Football Reference.com)
- L. C. Greenwood – Pittsburgh, 4 games IX, X, XIII, XIV

- Most sacks, game, 4

- L. C. Greenwood – Pittsburgh vs. Dallas, X

- Most safeties, game, 1

Defensive, tackle in end zone
- Dwight White – Pittsburgh vs. Minnesota, IX (Was first score of game)
- Henry Waechter – Chicago vs. New England, XX
- George Martin – New York Giants vs. Denver, XXI
- Bruce Smith – Buffalo vs. New York Giants, XXV
- Cliff Avril – Seattle vs. Denver, XLVIII (Was first score of game)
Special teams

Blocked punts

- Reggie Harrison – Pittsburgh vs. Dallas, X

Punter ran out of end zone

- Chris Culliver credited for safety – San Francisco vs. Baltimore Ravens, XLVII

=== Special teams ===
==== Kickoff returns ====
- Longest kickoff return, 108 yards, TD

- Jacoby Jones – Baltimore Ravens vs. San Francisco, XLVII

- Most kickoff returns, career, 10

- Ken Bell – Denver 3 games XXI, XXII, XXIV

- Most kickoff returns, game, 8

- Andre Coleman – San Diego vs. San Francisco, XXIX
- Marcus Knight – Oakland vs. Tampa Bay XXXVII

- Most kickoff return yards, career, 283

- Fulton Walker – Miami 2 games XVII, XIX

- Most kickoff return yards, game, 244

- Andre Coleman – San Diego vs. San Francisco, XXIX

- Highest kickoff return average, career (4 returns), 42.0 yards

- Tim Dwight, Atlanta, 1 game (5–210) XXXIII

- Highest kickoff return average, game (3 returns), 47.5 yards

- Fulton Walker, Miami vs. Washington (4–190), XVII

- Opening kickoff returned for touchdown, 1 time

- Devin Hester – Chicago vs. Indianapolis, XLI

- Most kickoff returns for touchdowns, game, 1

- Fulton Walker – Miami vs. Washington, XVII
- Stanford Jennings – Cincinnati vs. San Francisco, XXIII
- Andre Coleman – San Diego vs. San Francisco, XXIX
- Desmond Howard – Green Bay vs. New England, XXXI
- Tim Dwight – Atlanta vs. Denver, XXXIII
- Ron Dixon – New York Giants vs. Baltimore Ravens, XXXV
- Jermaine Lewis – Baltimore Ravens vs. New York Giants XXXV
- Devin Hester – Chicago vs. Indianapolis, XLI
- Jacoby Jones – Baltimore Ravens vs. San Francisco, XLVII
- Percy Harvin – Seattle vs. Denver, XLVIII

==== Kickoffs ====
- Most kickoffs for touchback, game, 6

- Harrison Butker – 7 kickoffs, 6 touchbacks – Kansas City vs. Philadelphia LVII
- Jake Elliott – 6 kickoffs, 6 touchbacks – Philadelphia vs. Kansas City LVII
- Harrison Butker – 6 kickoffs, 6 touchbacks – Kansas City vs. San Francisco LVIII
- Jake Moody – 6 kickoffs, 6 touchbacks – San Francisco vs. Kansas City LVIII

==== Punting ====
Players team listed first

- Longest punt, 65 yards

- Johnny Hekker – Los Angeles Rams vs. New England LIII

- Most punts inside 10 yard line, game, 3

- Steve Weatherford – New York Giants vs. New England XLVI

- Most punts, game, 11

- Brad Maynard – New York Giants vs. Baltimore Ravens XXXV

- Most punts, career, 17

- Mike Eischeid – 3 games Oakland II, Minnesota VIII, IX
- Mike Horan – 4 games Denver XXI, XXII, XXIV, St. Louis Rams XXXIV

- Highest punting average, career (10 punts), 46.5 yards

- Jerrel Wilson, Kansas City 2 games (11–511) – I, IV

- Highest punting average, game (4 punts), 51.8 yards

- Matt Araiza, Kansas City vs. Philadelphia (6–311), LIX

==== Punt returns ====
- Most punt returns, career, 8

- Troy Brown – New England 3 games XXXVI, XXXVIII, XXXIX
- Julian Edelman - New England 4 games XLVI, XLIX, LI, LIII

- Most punt returns, game, 6

- Mike Nelms – Washington vs. Miami, XVII
- Desmond Howard – Green Bay vs. New England, XXXI

- Most fair catches, game, 6

- Rashid Shaheed, Seattle vs New England, LX

- Most punt return yards gained, career, 94

- John Taylor – San Francisco 3 games XXIII, XXIV, XXIX

- Most punt return yards gained, game, 90

- Desmond Howard – Green Bay vs. New England, XXXI

- Longest punt return, 65 yards

- Kadarius Toney – Kansas City vs. Philadelphia, LVII

- Highest average, punt return yardage, career (4 returns), 15.7 yards

- John Taylor, 3 games (6–94) San Francisco XXIII, XXIV, XXIX

- Highest average, punt return yardage, game (3 returns), 18.7 yards

- John Taylor, San Francisco vs. Cincinnati (3–56), XXIII

- Most punt returns for touchdowns, game, 0

- none

==== Field goals ====
- Most field goals attempted, career, 10

- Adam Vinatieri – 5 games New England XXXI, XXXVI, XXXVIII, XXXIX, Indianapolis XLI
- Harrison Butker – 5 games Kansas City LIV, LV, LVII, LVIII, LIX

- Most field goals attempted, game, 5

- Jim Turner – New York Jets vs. Baltimore Colts, III
- Efren Herrera – Dallas vs. Denver, XII
- Jason Myers – Seattle vs. New England, LX

- Most field goals, career, 9

- Harrison Butker – 5 games Kansas City LIV, LV, LVII, LVIII, LIX (10 attempts)
- Jake Elliott – 3 games Philadelphia LII, LVII, LIX (9 attempts)

- Game-winning field goals

- Jim O'Brien 0:05 time left – Baltimore Colts vs. Dallas, V
- Adam Vinatieri 0:00 time left – New England vs. St. Louis Rams, XXXVI
- Adam Vinatieri 0:04 time left – New England vs. Carolina, XXXVIII
- Harrison Butker 0:08 time left – Kansas City vs. Philadelphia, LVII

- Most field goals, game, 5

- Jason Myers – Seattle vs. New England, LX

- Most 40-plus yard field goals, game, 3

- Garrett Hartley – New Orleans Saints vs. Indianapolis XLIV
- Jake Elliott – Philadelphia vs. Kansas City, LIX

- Longest field goal, 57 yards

- Harrison Butker – Kansas City vs. San Francisco, LVIII

- Shortest field goal, 9 yards

- Jim Turner – New York Jets vs. Baltimore Colts III
- Mike Clark – Dallas vs. Miami VI

Note: The goal posts were moved to the back of the end zone in 1974. As such, this record cannot be broken.

==== Points after touchdown ====
- Most (one point) PATs, career, 13

- Adam Vinatieri (13 attempts) – 5 games New England XXXI, XXXVI, XXXVIII, XXXIX, Indianapolis XLI

- Most (one point) extra points, game, 7

- Mike Cofer – San Francisco vs. Denver (8 attempts), XXIV
- Lin Elliot – Dallas vs. Buffalo (7 attempts), XXVII
- Doug Brien – San Francisco vs. San Diego (7 attempts), XXIX

- Most 2 point conversions, game, 1

- Mark Seay – San Diego vs. San Francisco XXIX
- Alfred Pupunu – San Diego vs. San Francisco XXIX
- Mark Chmura – Green Bay vs. New England XXXI
- Kevin Faulk – New England vs. Carolina XXXVIII
- Lance Moore – New Orleans vs. Indianapolis XLIV
- Antwaan Randle El – Pittsburgh vs. Green Bay XLV
- Wes Welker – Denver vs. Seattle XLVIII
- Bennie Fowler – Denver vs. Carolina 50
- James White – New England vs. Atlanta LI
- Danny Amendola – New England vs. Atlanta LI
- Jalen Hurts – Philadelphia vs. Kansas City LVII
- Justin Watson – Kansas City vs. Philadelphia LIX
- DeAndre Hopkins – Kansas City vs. Philadelphia LIX

== Team records ==
All records can be referenced at NFL.com.

- Most Super Bowl appearances, 12

- New England Patriots XX, XXXI, XXXVI, XXXVIII, XXXIX, XLII, XLVI, XLIX, LI, LII, LIII, LX

- Most consecutive Super Bowl appearances, 4

- Buffalo Bills XXV, XXVI, XXVII, XXVIII

- Most Super Bowl victories, 6

- New England Patriots XXXVI, XXXVIII, XXXIX, XLIX, LI, LIII
- Pittsburgh Steelers IX, X, XIII, XIV, XL, XLIII

- Most consecutive Super Bowl victories, 2 (occurred 9 times)

- Green Bay Packers I, II
- Miami Dolphins VII, VIII
- Pittsburgh Steelers IX, X
- Pittsburgh Steelers XIII, XIV
- San Francisco 49ers XXIII, XXIV
- Dallas Cowboys XXVII, XXVIII
- Denver Broncos XXXII, XXXIII
- New England Patriots XXXVIII, XXXIX
- Kansas City Chiefs LVII, LVIII

- Most Super Bowl losses, 6

- New England Patriots XX, XXXI, XLII, XLVI, LII, LX

- Most consecutive Super Bowl losses, 4

- Buffalo Bills XXV, XXVI, XXVII, XXVIII

- Super Bowl win with no home playoff games

- Green Bay Packers I – 2 playoff games
- Kansas City Chiefs IV – 3 playoff games
- Pittsburgh Steelers XL – 4 playoff games
- New York Giants XLII – 4 playoff games
- Green Bay Packers XLV – 4 playoff games
- Tampa Bay Buccaneers LV – 4 playoff games

- Most Super Bowl wins without a loss, 2

- Baltimore Ravens – XXXV, XLVII
- Tampa Bay Buccaneers — XXXVII, LV

- Longest Super Bowl win streak, 5 games

- San Francisco 49ers – XVI, XIX, XXIII, XXIV, XXIX

- Most Super Bowl appearances without a win, 4

- Minnesota Vikings IV, VIII, IX, XI
- Buffalo Bills XXV, XXVI, XXVII, XXVIII

- Most common matchup, 3

- Pittsburgh Steelers vs. Dallas Cowboys X, XIII, XXX

=== Scoring ===
==== Points ====
===== Single team =====
Record holder team listed first.

- Most points, game, 55

- San Francisco vs. Denver, XXIV

- Most consecutive points, game, 44

- Chicago vs. New England, XX

- Most points by a losing team, game, 35

- Philadelphia vs. Kansas City, LVII

- Fewest points, game, 3

- Miami vs. Dallas, VI
- Los Angeles Rams vs. New England, LIII

- Fewest points by winning team, game, 13

- New England vs. Los Angeles Rams, LIII

- Largest margin of victory, 45 points

- San Francisco 49ers vs. Denver (55–10), XXIV

- Smallest margin of victory, 1 point

- New York Giants vs. Buffalo (20–19), XXV

- Most points scored, first half of play, 35

- Washington vs. Denver, XXII

- Most points, second half of play, 30

- New York Giants vs. Denver, XXI

- Most points scored in any quarter of play, 35

- Washington vs. Denver (second quarter), XXII

- Most points, first quarter, 14 (by 7 teams)

- Miami vs. Minnesota, VIII
- Oakland vs. Philadelphia, XV
- Dallas vs. Buffalo, XXVII
- San Francisco vs. San Diego, XXIX
- New England vs. Green Bay, XXXI
- Chicago vs. Indianapolis, XLI
- Green Bay vs. Pittsburgh, XLV

- Most points, second quarter, 35

- Washington vs. Denver, XXII

- Most points, third quarter, 21

- Chicago vs. New England, XX

- Most points, fourth quarter, 21

- Dallas vs. Buffalo, XXVII
- Kansas City vs. San Francisco, LIV

- Most points, overtime, 6

- New England vs. Atlanta, LI
- Kansas City vs. San Francisco, LVIII

- Largest lead, end of first quarter, 14 points

- Miami vs. Minnesota (14–0), VIII
- Oakland vs. Philadelphia (14–0), XV
- Green Bay vs. Pittsburgh (14–0), XLV

- Largest halftime margin, 25 points

- Washington vs. Denver (35–10), XXII

- Largest halftime lead with a shutout, 24 points

- Philadelphia vs. Kansas City, LIX

- Largest lead, end of 3rd quarter, 41 points

- Chicago vs. New England (44–3), XX

- Largest comeback, 25 points

- New England vs. Atlanta, LI. Patriots behind 28–3; won 34–28 (OT)

- Largest 4th quarter comeback, 19 points

- New England vs. Atlanta, LI. Patriots behind 28–9; won 34–28 (OT)

- Largest halftime comeback, 18 points

- New England vs. Atlanta, LI. Patriots behind 21–3; won 34–28 (OT)

- Fewest points, first half, 0 (15 times)

- Baltimore Colts vs. New York Jets, III
- Minnesota 4 times – vs. Kansas City, IV, vs. Miami, VIII, vs. Pittsburgh, IX, vs. Oakland, XI
- Washington vs. Miami, VII
- Denver 2 times – vs. Dallas, XII, vs. Seattle, XLVIII
- Cincinnati vs. San Francisco, XVI
- Buffalo vs. Washington, XXVI
- Tennessee vs. St. Louis Rams, XXXIV
- New York Giants vs. Baltimore Ravens, XXXV
- Los Angeles Rams vs. New England, LIII
- Kansas City Chiefs vs. Philadelphia Eagles, LIX
- New England vs. Seattle, LX

- Fewest points, second half, 0 (8 times)

- Kansas City vs. Green Bay, I
- Dallas vs. Baltimore Colts, V
- Miami 4 times – vs. Dallas, VI, vs. Washington, VII, vs. Washington, XVII, vs. San Francisco, XIX. Super Bowl VII was the only time that a team failed to score in the second half and won.
- Denver vs. Washington, XXII
- Buffalo vs. Dallas, XXVIII

===== Both teams =====
- Most points, game, 75

- San Francisco (49) vs. San Diego (26), XXIX

- Fewest points, game, 16

- New England (13) vs. Los Angeles Rams (3), LIII

- Most points, first half, 45

- Washington (35) vs. Denver (10), XXII

- Most points, second half, 46

- Tampa Bay Buccaneers (28) vs. Oakland Raiders (18), XXXVII

- Fewest points, first half, 2

- Pittsburgh Steelers (2) vs. Minnesota Vikings (0), IX

- Fewest points, second half, 7

- Miami Dolphins (0) vs. Washington (7), VII
- Washington (7) vs. Denver (0), XXII

- Most points, first quarter, 24

- Green Bay (10) vs. New England (14), XXXI

- Most points, second quarter, 35

- Washington (35) vs. Denver (0), XXII

- Most points, third quarter, 24

- Washington (14) vs. Buffalo (10), XXVI
- Baltimore Ravens (7) vs. San Francisco (17), XLVII

- Most points, fourth quarter, 37

- New England (18) vs. Carolina (19), XXXVIII

- Most points, overtime, 9

- Kansas City (6) vs. San Francisco (3), LVIII

- Both teams scoring over 30 points, 4

- Pittsburgh (35) vs. Dallas (31), XIII
- Baltimore Ravens (34) vs. San Francisco (31), XLVII
- Philadelphia (41) vs. New England (33), LII
- Kansas City (38) vs. Philadelphia (35), LVII

==== Touchdowns ====
===== Single team =====
Record holder team listed first.

- Most touchdowns, game, 8

- San Francisco vs. Denver, XXIV

- Most touchdowns, losing team, game, 4

- Dallas vs. Pittsburgh, XIII
- Carolina vs. New England, XXXVIII
- Atlanta vs. New England, LI
- New England vs. Philadelphia, LII
- Philadelphia vs. Kansas City LVII

- Fewest touchdowns, winning team, game, 1

- New York Jets vs. Baltimore Colts, III
- New England vs. Los Angeles Rams, LIII

- Fewest touchdowns, game, 0

- Miami vs. Dallas, VI
- Los Angeles Rams vs. New England, LIII
- Kansas City vs. Tampa Bay, LV

- Longest touchdown scoring drive, 96 yards

- Chicago vs. New England, XX
- Indianapolis vs. New Orleans, XLIV
- New England vs. New York Giants, XLVI

===== Both teams =====
- Most touchdowns, game, 10

- San Francisco (7) vs. San Diego (3), XXIX

- Fewest touchdowns, game, 1

- New England (1) vs. Los Angeles Rams (0), LIII

==== Points after touchdown ====
===== Single team =====
Record holder team listed first.

- Most (one point) PATs, game, 7

- San Francisco vs. Denver (8 attempts), XXIV
- Dallas vs. Buffalo (7 attempts), XXVII
- San Francisco vs. San Diego (7 attempts), XXIX
Most two point conversions, game, 2
- San Diego vs. San Francisco, XXIX
- New England vs. Atlanta, LI
- Kansas City vs. Philadelphia, LIX

- Most missed PATs, game, 3

- Oakland (3 2pt tries) vs. Tampa Bay, XXXVII
- Philadelphia (1 K, 2 2pt tries) vs. New England, LII

===== Both teams =====
- Most (one point) PATs, game, 9

- Pittsburgh (5) vs. Dallas (4), XIII
- Dallas (7) vs. Buffalo (2) (XXVII)

- Fewest (one point) PATs, game, 1

- New England Patriots (1) vs. Los Angeles Rams (0), LIII

- Most two point conversions, game, 2

- San Diego (2) vs. San Francisco (0), XXIX
- New England (2) vs. Atlanta (0), LI
- Kansas City (2) vs. Philadelphia (0), LIX

- Most total PATs, game, 10

- San Diego (2 2 pt, 1 k) vs. San Francisco (7 k), XXIX

- Most missed PATs, game, 4

- New England (1 K) vs. Philadelphia (1 K, 2 2pt tries), LII

==== Field goals ====
===== Single team =====
Record holder team listed first.

- Most field goals attempted, game, 5

- New York Jets vs. Baltimore Colts, III
- Dallas vs. Denver, XII
- Seattle vs New England, LX

- Most field goals, game, 5

- Seattle vs New England, LX

===== Both teams =====
- Most field goals attempted, game, 7

- New York Jets (5) vs. Baltimore Colts (2), III
- San Francisco (4) vs. Cincinnati (3), XXIII
- St. Louis (4) vs. Tennessee (3), XXXIV
- Denver (4) vs. Atlanta (3), XXXIII
- Kansas City (4) vs. San Francisco (3), LVIII

- Fewest field goals attempted, game, 1

- Minnesota (0) vs. Miami (1), VIII
- San Francisco (0) vs. Denver (1), XXIV
- Philadelphia (0) vs. New England (1), XXXIX
- New England (0) vs. New York Giants (1), XLII
- New England (0) vs. Seattle (1), XLIX

- Most field goals, game, 7

- Kansas City (4) vs. San Francisco (3), LVIII

- Most field goals without miss, game, 7

- Kansas City (4) vs. San Francisco (3), LVIII

- Fewest field goals, game, 0

- Miami vs. Washington, VII
- Pittsburgh vs. Minnesota, IX

==== Safeties ====
Record holder team listed first.

- Most safeties, game, 1

- Pittsburgh vs. Minnesota, IX
- Pittsburgh vs. Dallas, X
- Chicago vs. New England, XX
- New York Giants vs. Denver, XXI
- Buffalo vs. New York Giants, XXV
- Arizona vs. Pittsburgh, XLIII
- New York Giants vs. New England, XLVI
- San Francisco vs. Baltimore Ravens, XLVII
- Seattle vs. Denver, XLVIII

=== Offense ===
==== Net yards gained, rushing and passing ====
===== Single team =====
Record holder team listed first.

- Most net yards, rushing and passing, game, 613

- New England vs. Philadelphia, LII

- Fewest net yards, rushing and passing, game, 119

- Minnesota vs. Pittsburgh, IX

- Fewest total yards, winning team, game, 194

- Denver vs. Carolina, 50

- Most offensive plays, game, 93

- New England vs. Atlanta, LI

- Most consecutive drives ending with a punt, game, 8

- Los Angeles Rams vs. New England, LIII

===== Both teams =====
- Most net yards, rushing and passing, game, 1,151

- New England (613) vs. Philadelphia (538), LII – all-time NFL record for any game, whether regular-season or postseason

- Fewest net yards, rushing and passing, game, 396

- New York Giants (152) vs. Baltimore Ravens (244), XXXV

==== Rushing ====
===== Single team =====
Record holder team listed first.

- Most rushing attempts, game, 57

- Pittsburgh vs. Minnesota, IX

- Fewest rushing attempts, winning team, game, 13

- St. Louis Rams vs. Tennessee, XXXIV
- Green Bay vs. Pittsburgh XLV

- Fewest rushing attempts, game, 9

- Miami vs. San Francisco, XIX

- Most yards rushing, game, 280

- Washington vs. Denver, XXII

- Fewest rushing yards, winning team, game, 29

- St. Louis Rams vs. Tennessee, XXXIV

- Fewest yards rushing, game, 7

- New England vs. Chicago, XX

- Highest average gain per rush attempt, game, 7.00 yards

- Los Angeles Raiders vs. Washington (33–231), XVIII
- Washington vs. Denver (40–280), XXII

- Lowest average gain per rush attempt, game, 0.64 yards

- New England vs. Chicago (11–7) XX

- Most rushing touchdowns, game, 4

- Chicago vs. New England, XX
- Denver vs. Green Bay, XXXII

- Fewest rushing touchdowns, game, 0 (44 teams)

- 2 times – Minnesota, Denver, Green Bay, New York Giants, Philadelphia, Cincinnati, San Francisco, Seattle
- 3 times – Oakland, Dallas, Miami, St. Louis/Los Angeles Rams
- 4 times – Kansas City
- 5 times – New England

| • Kansas City vs. Green Bay, I | • Oakland vs. Green Bay, II | • Dallas vs. Baltimore Colts V |
| • Miami vs. Dallas VI | • Washington vs. Miami VII | • Minnesota vs. Pittsburgh, IX |
| • Dallas vs. Pittsburgh, X | • Pittsburgh vs. Dallas, X | • Minnesota vs. Oakland, XI |
| • Dallas vs. Steelers, XIII | • Oakland vs. Philadelphia, XV | • Philadelphia vs. Oakland, XV |
| • Miami vs. Washington, XVII | • Miami vs. San Francisco, XIX | • New England vs. Chicago, XX |
| • Denver vs. Washington XXII | • Cincinnati vs. San Francisco, XXIII | • San Francisco vs. Cincinnati, XXIII |
| • Green Bay vs. Denver, XXXII | • Atlanta vs. Denver, XXXIII | • St. Louis Rams vs. Tennessee, XXXIV |
| • New York Giants vs. Baltimore Ravens, XXXV | • New England vs. St. Louis Rams, XXXVI | • Oakland vs. Tampa Bay, XXXVII |
| • Philadelphia vs. New England, XXXIX | • Seattle vs. Pittsburgh, XL | • Chicago vs. Indianapolis, XLI |
| • New York Giants vs. New England, XLII | • Arizona vs. Pittsburgh, XLIII | • New Orleans vs. Indianapolis, XLIV |
| • Green Bay vs. Pittsburgh, XLV | • New England vs. New York Giants, XLVI | • Baltimore Ravens vs. San Francisco, XLVII |
| • Denver vs. Seattle, XLVIII | • New England vs. Seattle, XLIX | • Los Angeles Rams vs. New England, LIII |
| • Kansas City vs. Tampa Bay, LV | • Los Angeles Rams vs. Cincinnati, LVI | • Cincinnati vs. Los Angeles Rams, LVI |
| • Kansas City vs. San Francisco, LVIII | • San Francisco vs. Kansas City, LVIII | • Kansas City vs. Philadelphia, LIX |
| • New England vs. Seattle, LX | • Seattle vs. New England, LX | |

===== Both teams =====
- Most rushing attempts, game, 81

- Washington (52) vs. Miami (29), XVII

- Fewest rushing attempts, game, 36

- Green Bay (13) vs. Pittsburgh (23), XLV

- Most yards rushing, game, 377

- Washington (280) vs. Denver (97), XXII

- Fewest yards rushing, game, 91

- Arizona (33) vs. Pittsburgh (58), XLIII

- Most rushing touchdowns, game, 4

- Miami (3) vs. Minnesota (1), VIII
- Chicago (4) vs. New England (0), XX
- San Francisco (3) vs. Denver (1), XXIV
- Denver (4) vs. Green Bay (0), XXXII
- Kansas City (1) vs. Philadelphia (3), LVII

- Fewest rushing touchdowns, game, 0

- Pittsburgh vs. Dallas, X
- Oakland vs. Philadelphia, XV
- Cincinnati vs. San Francisco, XXIII
- Cincinnati vs. Los Angeles Rams, LVI
- San Francisco vs. Kansas City, LVIII
- New England vs. Seattle, LX

==== Passing ====
===== Single team =====
Record holder team listed first.

- Most passing attempts, game, 63

- New England vs. Atlanta, LI

- Fewest passing attempts, game, 7

- Miami vs. Minnesota, VIII

- Most passes completed, game, 43

- New England vs. Atlanta LI

- Fewest passes completed, game, 4

- Miami vs. Washington, XVII

- Highest completion percentage, game (20 attempts), 88.0%

- New York Giants vs. Denver (25–22), XXI

- Lowest completion percentage, game (20 attempts), 32.0%

- Denver vs. Dallas (25–8), XII

- Most yards passing, game, 500

- New England vs. Philadelphia, LII

- Fewest yards passing, game, 35

- Denver vs. Dallas, XII

- Highest average yards gained per pass attempt, game, 14.7 yards

- Pittsburgh vs. Los Angeles Rams (309–21), XIV

- Lowest average yards gained per pass attempt, game, 1.4 yards

- Denver vs. Dallas (35–25), XII

- Most times intercepted, game, 5

- Oakland vs. Tampa Bay, XXXVII

- Most times sacked, game, 7

- Dallas vs. Pittsburgh, X
- New England vs. Chicago, XX
- Carolina vs. Denver, 50
- Cincinnati vs. Los Angeles Rams, LVI

- Fewest times sacked, game, 0 (14 teams)

- 2 times – Denver, Philadelphia
- 3 times – Baltimore/Indianapolis Colts

| • Baltimore Colts vs. New York Jets, III | • Baltimore Colts vs. Dallas, V | • Minnesota vs. Pittsburgh, IX |
| • Pittsburgh vs. Los Angeles Rams, XIV | • Philadelphia vs. Oakland, XV | • Washington vs. Buffalo, XXVI |
| • Denver vs. Green Bay, XXXII | • Denver vs. Atlanta, XXXIII | • Tampa Bay vs. Oakland, XXXVII |
| • New England vs. Carolina, XXXVIII | • Indianapolis vs. New Orleans, XLIV | • Seattle vs. Denver, XLVIII |
| • Philadelphia vs. New England, LII | • Kansas City vs. Philadelphia, LVII | |

- Most passing touchdowns, game, 6

- San Francisco vs. San Diego, XXIX

- Fewest passing touchdowns, game, 0 (24 teams)

- 2 times – Miami, Washington, Buffalo
- 3 times – Minnesota
- 4 times – Denver

| • New York Jets vs. Baltimore Colts, III | • Baltimore Colts vs. New York Jets, III | • Minnesota vs. Kansas City IV |
| • Miami vs. Dallas VI | • Washington vs. Miami VII | • Minnesota vs. Miami, VIII |
| • Miami vs. Minnesota, VIII | • Minnesota vs. Pittsburgh, IX | • Denver vs. Dallas, XII |
| • Washington vs. Los Angeles Raiders, XVIII | • Chicago vs. New England, XX | • Cincinnati vs. San Francisco, XXIII |
| • Denver vs. San Francisco, XXIV | • Buffalo vs. New York Giants, XXV | • Buffalo vs. Dallas, XXVIII |
| • Dallas vs. Buffalo, XXVIII | • Denver vs. Green Bay, XXXII | • Tennessee vs. St. Louis Rams, XXXIV |
| • New York Giants vs. Baltimore Ravens, XXXV | • Carolina vs. Denver, 50 | • Denver vs. Carolina, 50 |
| • New England vs. Los Angeles Rams, LIII | • Los Angeles Rams vs. New England, LIII | • Kansas City vs. Tampa Bay, LV |

- Most players, 100 or more receiving yards, game, 3

- New England vs. Philadelphia, LII (Danny Amendola 152, Chris Hogan 128, Rob Gronkowski 116)

===== Both teams =====
- Most passes attempted, game, 93

- San Diego (55) vs. San Francisco (38), XXIX
- New England (49) vs. Philadelphia (44), LII

- Fewest passes attempted, game, 35

- Miami (7) vs. Minnesota (28), VIII

- Most passes completed, game, 63

- New Orleans (32) vs. Indianapolis (31), XLIV

- Fewest passes completed, game, 19

- Miami (4) vs. Washington (15), XVII

- Highest completion percentage, game, 75.0%

- New Orleans (82.1%) vs. Indianapolis (68.9%), XLIV

- Most yards passing, game, 874

- New England (500) vs. Philadelphia (374), LII

- Fewest yards passing, game, 156

- Miami (69) vs. Washington (87), VII

- Most times sacked, game, 12

- Carolina (7) vs. Denver (5), 50

- Fewest times sacked, game, 1

- Philadelphia (0) vs. Oakland (1), XV
- Denver (0) vs. Green Bay (1), XXXII
- New Orleans (1) vs. Indianapolis (0), XLIV
- Seattle (0) vs. Denver (1), XLVIII
- Philadelphia (0) vs. New England (1), LII

- Most passing touchdowns, game, 7

- Pittsburgh (4) vs. Dallas (3), XIII
- San Francisco (6) vs. San Diego (1), XXIX
- New England (3) vs. Philadelphia (4), LII

- Fewest passing touchdowns, game, 0

- New York Jets vs. Baltimore Colts, III
- Miami vs. Minnesota, VIII
- Buffalo vs. Dallas, XXVIII
- Carolina vs. Denver, 50
- New England vs. Los Angeles Rams, LIII

==== First downs ====
===== Single team =====
Record holder team listed first.

- Most first downs, game, 37

- New England vs. Atlanta, LI

- Fewest first downs, game, 9

- Minnesota vs. Pittsburgh, IX
- Miami vs. Washington, XVII

- Most first downs rushing, game, 16

- San Francisco vs. Miami, XIX

- Fewest first downs, rushing, game, 1

- New England vs. Chicago, XX
- St. Louis vs. Tennessee, XXXIV
- Oakland vs. Tampa Bay, XXXVII
- New England vs. Seattle XLIX
- Kansas City vs. Philadelphia LIX

- Most first downs, passing, game, 26

- New England vs. Atlanta, LI

- Fewest first downs, passing, game, 1

- Denver vs. Dallas, XII

- Most first downs, penalty, game, 6

- Tampa Bay vs. Kansas City LV

- Most fourth down conversions, game, 2

- Kansas City vs. San Francisco, LIV
- Philadelphia vs.Kansas City LVII

===== Both teams =====
- Most first downs, game, 54

- New England (37) vs. Atlanta (17), LI
- New England (29) vs. Philadelphia (25), LII

- Fewest first downs, game, 24

- Dallas (10) vs. Baltimore Colts (14), V
- New York Giants (11) vs. Baltimore Ravens (13), XXXV

- Most first downs, rushing, game, 21

- Washington (14) vs. Miami (7), XVII

- Fewest first downs, rushing, game, 6

- Arizona (2) vs. Pittsburgh (4), XLIII

- Most first downs, passing, game, 42

- New England (23) vs. Philadelphia (19), LII

- Fewest first downs, passing, game, 9

- Denver (1) vs. Dallas (8), XII

- Most first downs, penalty, game, 9

- Tampa Bay (6) vs. Kansas City (3), LV

- Fewest first downs, penalty, game, 0

- Dallas vs. Miami, VI
- Miami vs. Washington, VII
- Dallas vs. Pittsburgh, X
- Miami vs. San Francisco, XIX
- Pittsburgh vs. Seattle, XL
- Pittsburgh vs. Green Bay XLV

- Lowest 3rd down conversion rate, game, 13.8%

- Denver (1–14) vs. Carolina (3–15), 50

=== Defense ===
==== Single team ====
Record holder team listed first.

- Most Interceptions by, game, 5

- Tampa Bay vs. Oakland, XXXVII

- Most yards gained by interception return, game, 172

- Tampa Bay vs. Oakland, XXXVII

- Most touchdowns scored by interception return, game, 3

- Tampa Bay vs. Oakland, XXXVII

- Most sacks, game, 7

- Pittsburgh vs. Dallas, X
- Chicago vs. New England, XX
- Denver vs. Carolina, 50
- Los Angeles Rams vs. Cincinnati, LVI

- Fewest yards allowed, 119

- Pittsburgh vs. Minnesota, IX

- Most yards allowed, 613

- Philadelphia vs. New England, LII

- Most yards allowed in a win, 613

- Philadelphia vs. New England, LII

==== Both teams ====
- Most interceptions by, game, 6

- Baltimore Colts (3) vs. Dallas (3), V
- Tampa Bay (5) vs. Oakland (1), XXXVII

- Fewest interceptions by, game, 0

- Buffalo vs. New York Giants, XXV
- St. Louis Rams vs. Tennessee, XXXIV
- Kansas City vs. Philadelphia, LVII

- Fewest yards allowed, 396

- Baltimore Ravens (152) vs. New York Giants (244), XXXV

- Most yards allowed, 1151

- Philadelphia (613) vs. New England (538), LII

- Most yards gained by interception return, game, 184

- Tampa Bay (172) vs. Oakland Raiders (12), XXXVII

- Most sacks by, game, 12

- Denver (7) vs. Carolina (5), 50

- Fewest sacks by, game, 1

- Philadelphia (1) vs. New England (0), LII

=== Fumbles ===
==== Single team ====
Record holder team listed first.

- Most fumbles, game, 8

- Buffalo vs. Dallas, XXVII

- Most fumbles lost, game, 5

- Buffalo vs. Dallas, XXVII

- Most fumbles recovered, game, 8

- Dallas vs. Denver, XII (4 own, 4 opponent)

==== Both teams ====
- Most fumbles, both teams, game, 12

- Buffalo (8) vs. Dallas (4), XXVII

- Fewest fumbles, both teams, game, 0

- Los Angeles Rams vs. Pittsburgh, XIV
- Green Bay vs. New England, XXXI
- Pittsburgh vs. Seattle, XL
- New Orleans vs. Indianapolis, XLIV
- New England vs. Seattle XLIX
- Cincinnati vs. Los Angeles Rams LVI

- Most fumbles lost, both teams, game, 7

- Buffalo (5) vs. Dallas (2), XXVII

- Fewest fumbles lost, both teams, game, 0 (19 times)

- 2 times – Green Bay, Dallas, Denver, Seattle, San Francisco, Tampa Bay
- 3 times – New York Giants, Kansas City
- 4 times – Pittsburgh, New England, Los Angeles/St. Louis Rams

| • Green Bay vs. Kansas City, I | • Dallas vs. Pittsburgh, X | • Los Angeles Rams vs. Pittsburgh, XIV |
| • Denver vs. New York Giants, XXI | • Denver vs. Washington, XXII | • Buffalo vs. New York Giants, XXV |
| • San Diego vs. San Francisco, XXIX | • Dallas vs. Pittsburgh, XXX | • Green Bay vs. New England, XXXI |
| • St. Louis Rams vs. Tennessee, XXXIV | • Oakland vs. Tampa Bay, XXXVII | • Pittsburgh vs. Seattle, XL |
| • New Orleans vs. Indianapolis, XLIV | • New York Giants vs. New England, XLVI | • New England vs. Seattle XLIX |
| • New England vs. Los Angeles Rams LIII | • Kansas City vs. San Francisco, LIV | • Kansas City vs. Tampa Bay, LV |
• Cincinnati vs. Los Angeles Rams, LVI

=== Turnovers ===
Turnovers are defined as the number of times losing the ball on interceptions and fumbles.

==== Single team ====
Record holder team listed first.

- Most turnovers, game, 9

- Buffalo vs. Dallas, XXVII

- Fewest turnovers, game, 0 (24 teams)

- 2 times – Oakland, San Francisco, Seattle
- 3 times – Green Bay, New York Giants

| • Green Bay vs. Oakland, II | • Miami vs. Minnesota, VIII | • Pittsburgh vs. Dallas, X |
| • Oakland vs. Minnesota, XI | • Oakland vs. Philadelphia XV | • New York Giants vs. Denver, XXI |
| • San Francisco vs. Denver, XXIV | • Buffalo vs. New York Giants, XXV | • New York Giants vs. Buffalo, XXV |
| • San Francisco vs. San Diego, XXIX | • Dallas vs. Pittsburgh, XXX | • Green Bay vs. New England, XXXI |
| • St. Louis Rams vs. Tennessee, XXXIV | • Tennessee vs. St. Louis Rams, XXXIV | • Baltimore Ravens vs. New York Giants, XXXV |
| • New England vs. St. Louis Rams, XXXVI | • New Orleans vs. Indianapolis, XLIV | • Green Bay vs. Pittsburgh, XLV |
| • New York Giants vs. New England, XLVI | • Seattle vs. Denver, XLVIII | • Tampa Bay vs. Kansas City, LV |
| • Cincinnati vs. Los Angeles Rams, LVI | • Kansas City vs. Philadelphia, LVII | • Seattle vs. New England, LX |

==== Both teams ====
- Most turnovers, game, 11

- Baltimore Colts (7) vs. Dallas (4), V
- Buffalo (9) vs. Dallas (2), XXVII

- Fewest turnovers, game, 0

- Buffalo vs. New York Giants, XXV
- St. Louis Rams vs. Tennessee, XXXIV

=== Kickoff returns ===
==== Single team ====
Record holder team listed first.

- Most kickoff returns, game, 9

- Denver vs. San Francisco, XXIV
- Oakland vs. Tampa Bay, XXXVII

- Fewest kickoff returns, game, 0

- Seattle vs. New England XLIX
- Cincinnati vs. Los Angeles Rams LVI
- Kansas City vs. Philadelphia LVII
- Kansas City vs. San Francisco LVIII
- San Francisco vs. Kansas City LVIII

- Most yards gained, game, 244

- San Diego vs. San Francisco, XXIX

- Fewest yards gained, game, 0

- Seattle vs. New England XLIX
- Cincinnati vs. Los Angeles Rams LVI
- Kansas City vs. Philadelphia LVII
- Kansas City vs. San Francisco LVIII
- San Francisco vs. Kansas City LVIII

- Highest average gain, game (3 returns), 44.0 yards

- Cincinnati vs. San Francisco, XXIII (3–132)

- Most touchdowns, game, 1

- Miami vs. Washington, XVII
- Cincinnati vs. San Francisco, XXIII
- San Diego vs. San Francisco, XXIX
- Green Bay vs. New England, XXXI
- Atlanta vs. Denver, XXXIII
- Baltimore Ravens vs. New York Giants, XXXV
- New York Giants vs. Baltimore Ravens, XXXV
- Chicago vs. Indianapolis, XLI
- Baltimore Ravens vs. San Francisco, XLVII
- Seattle vs. Denver, XLVIII

==== Both teams ====
- Most kickoff returns, game, 13

- Oakland (9) vs. Tampa Bay (4), XXXVII

- Fewest kickoff returns, game, 0

- Kansas City (0) vs. San Francisco (0), LVIII

- Most yards gained, game, 312

- Baltimore Ravens (206) vs. San Francisco (106), XLVII

- Fewest yards gained, game, 0

- Kansas City (0) vs. San Francisco (0), LVIII

- Most touchdowns, game, 2

- Baltimore Ravens (1) vs. New York Giants (1), XXXV

=== Punting ===
==== Single team ====
Record holder team listed first.

- Most punts, game, 11

- New York Giants vs. Baltimore Ravens, XXXV

- Fewest punts, game, 0

- New England vs. Philadelphia, LII

- Highest average, game (4 punts), 51.8 yards

- Kansas City vs. Philadelphia (6–311), LIX

- Lowest average, game (4 punts), 31.00 yards

- Tampa Bay vs. Oakland (4–124), XXXVII

- Most punts inside the 10 yard line, 3

- N Y Giants vs. New England, XLVI

==== Both teams ====
- Most punts, game, 21

- New York Giants (11) vs. Baltimore Ravens (10), XXXV

- Fewest punts, game, 1

- Philadelphia (1) vs. New England (0), LII

=== Punt returns ===
==== Single team ====
Record holder team listed first.

- Most punt returns, game, 6

- Washington vs. Miami, XVII
- Green Bay vs. New England, XXXI

- Fewest punt returns, game, 0

| • Minnesota vs. Miami, VIII | • Buffalo vs. New York Giants, XXV | • Washington vs. Buffalo, XXVI |
| • Denver vs. Green Bay, XXXII | • Green Bay vs. Denver, XXXII | • Atlanta vs. Denver, XXXIII |
| • Denver vs. Atlanta, XXXIII | • New England vs. New York Giants, XLVI | • Seattle vs. Denver, XLVIII |
| • Philadelphia vs. New England, LII | • New England vs. Philadelphia, LII | • Kansas City vs. San Francisco, LIV |
• Tampa Bay vs. Kansas City, LV

- Most yards gained, game, 90

- Green Bay vs. New England, XXXI

- Fewest yards gained, game, –1

- Dallas vs. Miami, VI
- Tennessee vs. St. Louis Rams, XXXIV

- Highest average return yardage, game (3 returns), 18.7 yards

- San Francisco vs. Cincinnati (3–56), XXIII

==== Both teams ====
- Most punt returns, game, 10

- Green Bay (6) vs. New England (4), XXXI

- Fewest punt returns, game, 0

- Denver vs. Green Bay XXXII
- Atlanta vs. Denver, XXXIII
- Philadelphia vs. New England, LII

- Most yards gained, game, 120

- Green Bay (90) vs. New England (30), XXXI

- Fewest yards gained, game, 0

- Denver vs. Green Bay, XXXII
- Atlanta vs. Denver, XXXIII
- Philadelphia vs. New England, LII
- Kansas City vs. San Francisco, LIV
- Kansas City vs. Tampa Bay LV

=== Penalties ===
==== Single team ====
Record holder team listed first.

- Most penalties, game, 12

- Dallas vs. Denver, XII
- Carolina vs. New England, XXXVIII
- Carolina vs. Denver, 50

- Fewest penalties, game, 0

- Miami vs. Dallas, VI
- Pittsburgh vs. Dallas, X
- Denver vs. San Francisco, XXIV
- Atlanta vs. Denver, XXXIII

- Most yards penalized, game, 133 yards

- Dallas vs. Baltimore Colts, V

- Fewest yards penalized, game, 0

- Miami vs. Dallas, VI
- Pittsburgh vs. Dallas, X
- Denver vs. San Francisco, XXIV
- Atlanta vs. Denver, XXXIII

==== Both teams ====
- Most penalties, game, 20

- Dallas (12) vs. Denver (8), XII
- Carolina (12) vs. New England (8), XXXVIII

- Fewest penalties, game, 2

- Pittsburgh (0) vs. Dallas (2), X

- Most yards penalized, game, 164 yards

- Dallas (133) vs. Baltimore Colts (31), V

- Fewest yards penalized, game, 15 yards

- Miami (0) vs. Dallas (15), VI

== Time ==
- Fastest score from start of game, 12 seconds

- Seattle Seahawks, safety (XLVIII)

- Least playing time in the lead by winning team, 0 minutes, 0 seconds

- New England Patriots vs. Atlanta Falcons (LI) (did not lead in regulation, achieved winning score in overtime)

- Most playing time in the lead by losing team, 41 minutes, 18 seconds

- Atlanta Falcons vs. New England Patriots (LI)

- Most playing time in the lead, 59 minutes, 48 seconds

- Seattle Seahawks (XLVIII)

- Longest time before first score, team, 57 minutes, 53 seconds

- Washington Redskins (VII)

- Longest time before either team scores, 26 minutes, 55 seconds

- Carolina Panthers vs. New England Patriots (XXXVIII)

- Most time of possession, 40 minutes, 33 seconds

- New York Giants (XXV)

- Longest drive, 9 minutes, 59 seconds

- New York Giants (XLII)

- Longest Super Bowl, elapsed time between kickoff and end of game, 4 hours, 14 minutes (includes 34 minute power outage in the 3rd quarter)

- Baltimore Ravens vs. San Francisco (XLVII)

- Longest Super Bowl, amount of playing time, 74 minutes, 57 seconds (overtime game)

- Kansas City Chiefs vs. San Francisco 49ers (LVIII)

- Longest drought without repeat World Champions

- 19 years (2004 New England Patriots–2023 Kansas City Chiefs)

== Coaching ==
- Most games as head coach, 9

- Bill Belichick: New England Patriots (XXXVI, XXXVIII, XXXIX, XLII, XLVI, XLIX, LI, LII, and LIII)

- Most Super Bowl wins as head coach, 6

- Bill Belichick: New England Patriots (XXXVI, XXXVIII, XXXIX, XLIX, LI, and LIII)

- Most appearances as a coach, 12

- Bill Belichick – assistant coach New York Giants XXI, XXV, New England XXXI, head coach New England XXXVI, XXXVIII, XXXIX, XLII, XLVI, XLIX, LI, LII, and LIII

- Most Super Bowl losses, 4

- Bud Grant: Minnesota (IV, VIII, IX, and XI)
- Don Shula: Baltimore Colts (III), Miami Dolphins (VI, XVII, and XIX)
- Marv Levy: Buffalo Bills (XXV, XXVI, XXVII, and XXVIII)
- Dan Reeves: Denver Broncos (XXI, XXII, and XXIV), Atlanta Falcons (XXXIII)

- Won as a player and a coach

- Tom Flores: Kansas City (IV), Oakland/Los Angeles Raiders (XV, XVIII)
- Mike Ditka: Dallas (VI), Chicago (XX)
- Tony Dungy: Pittsburgh (XIII), Indianapolis (XLI)
- Doug Pederson: Green Bay (XXXI), Philadelphia (LII)

- Played and coached for the same team in a Super Bowl

- Gary Kubiak: Denver Broncos (player XXI, XXII and XXIV; coach 50)
- Mike Vrabel: New England Patriots (player XXXVI, XXXVIII, XXXIX and XLII; coach LX)

- Most teams as head coach, 2

- Don Shula: Baltimore Colts, Miami Dolphins
- Dick Vermeil: Philadelphia Eagles, St. Louis Rams
- Dan Reeves: Denver Broncos, Atlanta Falcons
- Bill Parcells: New York Giants, New England Patriots
- Mike Holmgren: Green Bay Packers, Seattle Seahawks
- John Fox: Carolina Panthers, Denver Broncos
- Andy Reid: Philadelphia Eagles, Kansas City Chiefs

- Youngest to win, 36 years, 20 days

- Sean McVay: Los Angeles Rams (LVI)

- Oldest to win, 68 years, 127 days

- Bruce Arians: Tampa Bay Buccaneers (LV)

- Most seasons between appearances, 19

- Dick Vermeil: Philadelphia Eagles, St. Louis Rams (XV and XXXIV)

- Most Super Bowl wins with a different starting quarterback, 3

- Joe Gibbs: Washington Redskins XVII (Joe Theismann), XXII (Doug Williams), XXVI (Mark Rypien)

- Teams winning with 3 different head coaches

- Dallas Cowboys: Tom Landry (VI, XII), Jimmy Johnson (XXVII, XXVIII), Barry Switzer (XXX)
- Pittsburgh Steelers: Chuck Noll (IX, X, XIII, XIV), Bill Cowher (XL), Mike Tomlin (XLIII)
- Green Bay Packers: Vince Lombardi (I, II), Mike Holmgren (XXXI), Mike McCarthy (XLV)

== Popularity ==
- Most-watched Super Bowl broadcast, 127.7 million viewers

- LIX Philadelphia Eagles vs. Kansas City Chiefs – highest rated broadcast of all time

- Least-watched Super Bowl broadcast, 39.12 million viewers

- II Green Bay Packers vs. Oakland Raiders

- Highest stadium audience attendance, 103,985

- XIV Los Angeles Rams vs. Pittsburgh Steelers

- Lowest stadium audience attendance, 24,835

- LV Kansas City Chiefs vs. Tampa Bay Buccaneers (due to the COVID-19 pandemic)

- Lowest stadium audience attendance, attendance not restricted, 61,629

- LVIII San Francisco 49ers vs. Kansas City Chiefs

== Miscellaneous ==
- Coldest Super Bowl kickoff, 39 °F at Tulane Stadium, New Orleans

- Dallas Cowboys vs. Miami Dolphins, Super Bowl VI

- Hottest Super Bowl kickoff, 84 °F at Los Angeles Memorial Coliseum, Los Angeles

- Miami Dolphins vs. Washington Redskins, Super Bowl VII

- Rainiest Super Bowl, 0.92 inches at Dolphin Stadium, Miami Gardens, Florida

- Indianapolis vs. Chicago, Super Bowl XLI

- Biggest point spread, 18.5 points, San Francisco favored

- San Diego vs San Francisco, Super Bowl XXIX

- Biggest point spread upset, 18 points, Baltimore favored

- New York Jets vs. Baltimore Colts

- Won the Heisman Trophy, College National Championship, Super Bowl, and NFL MVP

- Marcus Allen – Super Bowl XVIII (also was Super Bowl MVP)

- Most total quarterback starts by university

- 10 – Michigan – Tom Brady
- 7 – Notre Dame – Joe Montana (4), Joe Theismann (2), Daryle Lamonica (1)
- 7 – Stanford – John Elway (5), Jim Plunkett (2)

== Non-occurrences ==
In the history of the Super Bowl, the following firsts have yet to occur:

- Snow – Super Bowl XLI was the first to feature rain, but snow has yet to fall during a Super Bowl, mainly because the league has purposely placed the game in venues where snow is rare. Only once, at Super Bowl XLVIII, has the league awarded the Super Bowl to an outdoor venue where snow is a common occurrence in late January and early February, and that particular game was warmer than usual for that time of year.
- An all-wild card matchup (teams who failed to win their divisions) – Eleven wild card teams have won conference titles since the AFL–NFL merger, but never two in the same season. The closest the NFL has come to having an all-wild card Super Bowl occurred during the 2010–11 NFL playoffs when the New York Jets, a wild card team, reached the AFC Championship Game where they played the Pittsburgh Steelers. The Steelers beat the Jets 24–19. In the subsequent Super Bowl, the Steelers faced another wild card team, the Green Bay Packers, who beat them 31–25.
- A punt return for touchdown – Many kickoffs have been returned for touchdowns, and three blocked punts have been returned for a touchdown.
- A shutout – Every Super Bowl participant to date has scored. In seven cases, the offenses have failed to score a touchdown. In four of those cases, the special teams scored the only touchdown:

Super Bowl VI: The Miami Dolphins finished with three points, tied for the fewest points by a single team in a Super Bowl to date (and making them one of three teams to date to fail to score a touchdown).
Super Bowl VII: The Washington Redskins, after blocking a field goal attempt, returned a fumble on an attempted pass by the Miami Dolphins kicker, Garo Yepremian, for a touchdown and converted the extra point with 2:07 remaining in the game.
Super Bowl IX: The Minnesota Vikings recovered a blocked punt in the end zone but did not convert the extra point with 10:33 left in the game.
Super Bowl XXIII: The Cincinnati Bengals scored on a 93-yard kickoff return with extra point in the third quarter and kicked three field goals throughout the game.
Super Bowl XXXV: The New York Giants scored on a 97-yard kickoff return and converted the extra point in the third quarter.
Super Bowl LIII: The Los Angeles Rams scored only three points on a field goal versus the New England Patriots (tying the Miami Dolphins’ record for fewest points in a game originally set in Super Bowl VI).
Super Bowl LV: The Kansas City Chiefs scored three field goals but no touchdowns.

- Two teams from the same metropolitan area – Two cities currently have two franchises: New York hosts both the Giants and the Jets, and Los Angeles hosts both the Chargers and the Rams. In addition, the Baltimore Ravens and the Washington Commanders share a common metropolitan area, although they are based in different cities. All of the teams mentioned above except for the Chargers have won a Super Bowl, but never against their neighbor.

Super Bowl XLI between the Indianapolis Colts and Chicago Bears represents the geographically closest teams, separated by only 164 miles (264 km).
One game involved teams from the same state: Super Bowl XXIX involved the San Francisco 49ers and the San Diego Chargers. Super Bowl XXV involved the Buffalo Bills of New York and the New York Giants, who also historically and nominally represented the state but were by this point based in New Jersey.

- An appearance by every team – Four teams have yet to reach their first Super Bowl: the Cleveland Browns, Detroit Lions, Houston Texans and Jacksonville Jaguars. The Lions and Browns both won NFL championships in the pre-Super Bowl era, most recently in 1957 and 1964, respectively. The Jaguars and Texans are post-merger expansion teams that began play in 1995 and 2002, respectively.
- Every team winning – 12 teams have yet to win their first Super Bowl: the Arizona Cardinals, Atlanta Falcons, Buffalo Bills, Carolina Panthers, Cincinnati Bengals, Los Angeles Chargers, Minnesota Vikings, and Tennessee Titans, along with the four that have not appeared in a Super Bowl. The Chargers, the Titans (known as the Houston Oilers from 1960 to 1996), and the Bills all won American Football League (AFL) championships in the pre-Super Bowl era. The Cardinals, Browns and the Lions have won NFL championships in the pre-Super Bowl era. The Vikings won the 1969 NFL Championship Game, the last NFL Championship Game before the AFL–NFL merger, but lost Super Bowl IV to the AFL champions, the Kansas City Chiefs. Since the merger, the Vikings have appeared in the Super Bowl three more times (Super Bowl VIII, Super Bowl IX, and most recently in Super Bowl XI) but lost all three of them. Thus the Jaguars, Texans, Bengals, Falcons, and Panthers have yet to win their first league championship.
- Every team losing – The Baltimore Ravens, New Orleans Saints, New York Jets, Tampa Bay Buccaneers, and the four teams that have never reached a Super Bowl have yet to lose a Super Bowl.
- No touchdowns scored – In every Super Bowl to date, there has been at least one touchdown scored (fewest combined – 1, in Super Bowl LIII).
- A three-peat. Two teams (the New England Patriots and the Dallas Cowboys) won three Super Bowl titles in four years and the Pittsburgh Steelers won four Super Bowl titles in six years, which included back to back championships twice. New England did the same from 2016 to 2018, winning the first and the last Super Bowls of three appearances. The Green Bay Packers were the 1965 NFL Champions and won the first two Super Bowls following their victories in the 1966 and 1967 NFL Championship Games. The Buffalo Bills appeared in four consecutive Super Bowls, but lost every time. The Miami Dolphins appeared in three consecutive Super Bowls from 1971 to 1973, winning the final two. The 2024 Chiefs had the closest attempt at a three-peat in their third consecutive Super Bowl in Super Bowl LIX, after winning the previous two, but was not able to convert the third game into a win.
- Fair catch kick – A fair catch kick has never been attempted in the Super Bowl. The only scenario in which a fair catch kick was seriously considered was at the end of regulation in Super Bowl LI, when New England Patriots head coach Bill Belichick considered a 75-yard fair catch kick attempt. Belichick decided against it, however, since the kick would not have had a realistic chance of success and could have been returned by the Atlanta Falcons for a game-winning touchdown.
- A head coach leading two different teams to Super Bowl victories. Five Super Bowl-winning coaches also coached another team but lost: Don Shula, Bill Parcells, Mike Holmgren, Dick Vermeil and Andy Reid.
