= 1983 All-Pro Team =

Official list of the best NFL players in 1983

The 1983 All-Pro Team is composed of the National Football League players that were named to the Associated Press, Newspaper Enterprise Association, Pro Football Writers Association, Pro Football Weekly, and The Sporting News in 1983. Both first- and second- teams are listed for the AP and NEA teams. These are the five teams that are included in Total Football II: The Official Encyclopedia of the National Football League. The NEA chose two inside linebackers for the first time, as a reflection of the 3-4 which was the common alignment for NFL defenses in the mid-1980s.

== Teams ==
Offense
Position	First team	Second team
Quarterback	Joe Theismann, Washington Redskins (AP, NEA, PFWA, PFW, TSN)	Dan Marino, Miami Dolphins (AP-2); Joe Montana, San Francisco 49ers (NEA-2)
Running back	John Riggins, Washington Redskins (AP, PFWA, PFW); Eric Dickerson, Los Angeles Rams (AP, NEA, PFWA, PFW, TSN); William Andrews, Atlanta Falcons (NEA, TSN)	Tony Dorsett, Dallas Cowboys (AP-2); Curt Warner, Seattle Seahawks (AP-2); Walter Payton, Chicago Bears (NEA-2); John Riggins, Washington Redskins (NEA-2)
Wide receiver	Roy Green, St. Louis Cardinals (AP, NEA, PFWA, PFW, TSN); Mike Quick, Philadelphia Eagles (AP, NEA, PFW); James Lofton, Green Bay Packers (PFWA); Steve Largent, Seattle Seahawks (TSN)	James Lofton, Green Bay Packers (AP-2, NEA-2); Cris Collinsworth, Cincinnati Bengals (AP-2, NEA-2)
Tight end	Todd Christensen, Los Angeles Raiders (AP, NEA, PFWA, PFW, TSN)	Ozzie Newsome, Cleveland Browns (AP-2, NEA-2)
Tackle	Joe Jacoby, Washington Redskins (AP, NEA, PFWA, PFW, TSN); Anthony Muñoz, Cincinnati Bengals (AP, PFWA); Keith Fahnhorst, San Francisco 49ers (NEA); Mike Kenn, Atlanta Falcons (PFW); Eric Laakso, Miami Dolphins (TSN)	Mike Kenn, Atlanta Falcons (AP-2); Cody Risien, Cleveland Browns (NEA-2); Jackie Slater, Los Angeles Rams (AP-2, NEA-2)
Guard	John Hannah, New England Patriots (AP, NEA, PFWA, PFW, TSN); Russ Grimm, Washington Redskins (AP, NEA, PFWA, PFW); Kent Hill, Los Angeles Rams (TSN)	Ed Newman, Miami Dolphins (AP-2, NEA-2); Joe DeLamielleure, Cleveland Browns (AP-2); Mike Munchak, Houston Oilers (NEA-2)
Center	Dwight Stephenson, Miami Dolphins (NEA, PFWA, PFW); Mike Webster, Pittsburgh Steelers (AP, TSN)	Larry McCarren, Green Bay Packers (NEA-2); Dwight Stephenson, Miami Dolphins (AP-2)

Special teams
Position	First team	Second team
Kicker	Ali Haji-Sheikh, New York Giants (AP, NEA, PFWA, PFW, TSN)	Gary Anderson, Pittsburgh Steelers (AP-2); Raúl Allegre, Baltimore Colts (NEA-2)
Punter	Rich Camarillo, New England Patriots (NEA, PFWA, PFW, TSN); Rohn Stark, Baltimore Colts (AP)	Rich Camarillo, New England Patriots (AP-2); Rohn Stark, Baltimore Colts (NEA-2)
Kick returner	Fulton Walker, Miami Dolphins (PFWA, PFW, TSN); Mike Nelms, Washington Redskins (AP)	Billy "White Shoes" Johnson, Atlanta Falcons (AP-2)
Punt returner	Billy "White Shoes" Johnson, Atlanta Falcons (PFWA, PFW, TSN)	

Defense
Position	First team	Second team
Defensive end	Mark Gastineau, New York Jets (AP); Howie Long, Los Angeles Raiders (NEA, PFWA, PFW, TSN); Doug Betters, Miami Dolphins (AP, NEA, PFWA, PFW, TSN)	Howie Long, Los Angeles Raiders (AP-2); Jacob Green, Seattle Seahawks (NEA-2); Ed Jones, Dallas Cowboys (AP-2, NEA-2)
Defensive tackle	Randy White, Dallas Cowboys (AP, PFWA, PFW, TSN); Dave Butz, Washington Redskins (AP, NEA, PFW, TSN); Doug English, Detroit Lions (PFWA); Fred Smerlas, Buffalo Bills (NEA); Bob Baumhower, Miami Dolphins (AP-NT)	Joe Klecko, New York Jets (AP-2); Doug English, Detroit Lions (AP-2, NEA-2); Fred Smerlas, Buffalo Bills (AP-2-NT); Randy White, Dallas Cowboys (NEA-2)
Middle linebacker	Jack Lambert, Pittsburgh Steelers (AP, NEA, PFWA, PFW, TSN); Mike Singletary, Chicago Bears (NEA, PFW); Lawrence Taylor, New York Giants (TSN-ILB)	Randy Gradishar, Denver Broncos (AP-2); Jerry Robinson, Philadelphia Eagles (NEA-2); Tom Cousineau, Cleveland Browns (NEA-2)
Outside linebacker	Chip Banks, Cleveland Browns (AP, PFWA, PFW); Lawrence Taylor, New York Giants (AP, NEA, PFWA, PFW); Rod Martin, Los Angeles Raiders (NEA, TSN); Hugh Green, Tampa Bay Buccaneers (TSN)	Rod Martin, Los Angeles Raiders (AP-2); Hugh Green, Tampa Bay Buccaneers (AP-2, NEA-2); Chip Banks, Cleveland Browns (NEA-2)
Cornerback	Ken Riley, Cincinnati Bengals (AP, PFW, TSN); Gary Green, Kansas City Chiefs (NEA, PFWA); Lester Hayes, Los Angeles Raiders (PFW); Everson Walls, Dallas Cowboys (AP); Louis Wright, Denver Broncos (NEA); Ronnie Lott, San Francisco 49ers (PFWA); Raymond Clayborn, New England Patriots (TSN)	Lester Hayes, Los Angeles Raiders (AP-2, NEA-2); Johnnie Poe, New Orleans Saints (NEA-2); Mark Haynes, New York Giants (AP-2)
Safety	Mark Murphy, Washington Redskins (AP, PFWA-FS, PFW, TSN); Kenny Easley, Seattle Seahawks (AP, NEA, PFWA-SS, PFW); Johnnie Johnson, Los Angeles Rams (NEA); Steve Freeman, Buffalo Bills (TSN)	Deron Cherry, Kansas City Chiefs (AP-2); Vann McElroy, Los Angeles Raiders (AP-2); Nolan Cromwell, Los Angeles Rams (NEA-2); Mark Murphy, Washington Redskins (NEA-2)

== Key ==
- AP = Associated Press first-team All-Pro
- AP-2 = Associated Press second-team All-Pro
- NEA = Newspaper Enterprise Association first-team All-Pro team
- NEA-2 = Newspaper Enterprise Association second-team All-Pro team
- PFW = Pro Football Weekly All-Pro team
- PFWA = Pro Football Writers Association All-NFL
- TSN = The Sporting News All-Pro
