= Dave Butz =

American football player (1950–2022)

No. 62, 65
- Position: Defensive tackle

Personal information
- Born: June 23, 1950; LaFayette, Alabama, U.S.
- Died: November 4, 2022 (aged 72); Swansea, Illinois, U.S.
- Listed height: 6 ft 7 in (2.01 m)
- Listed weight: 295 lb (134 kg)

Career information
- High school: Maine South (Park Ridge, Illinois)
- College: Purdue
- NFL draft: 1973: 1st round, 5th overall pick

Career history
- St. Louis Cardinals (1973–1974); Washington Redskins (1975–1988)

Awards and highlights
- 2× Super Bowl champion (XVII, XXII); First-team All-Pro (1983); Second-team All-Pro (1984); Pro Bowl (1983); NFL 1980s All-Decade Team; 70 Greatest Redskins; Washington Redskins Ring of Fame; Consensus All-American (1972); First-team All-Big Ten (1972); Second-team All-Big Ten (1971)

Career NFL statistics
- Sacks: 64
- Games played: 216
- Interceptions: 2
- Stats at Pro Football Reference
- College Football Hall of Fame

David Ray Butz (June 23, 1950 – November 4, 2022) was an American professional football player who was a defensive tackle in the National Football League (NFL) for the St. Louis Cardinals and the Washington Redskins in a 16-year career from 1973 to 1988. During his time with Washington, as the team's defensive "anchor", he helped the Redskins reach the Super Bowl thrice, winning twice. He was named as one of the 70 Greatest Redskins in franchise history and a member of the NFL 1980s All-Decade Team. Before turning professional, he played college football for the Purdue Boilermakers. He was inducted to the College Football Hall of Fame in 2014.

== Early life ==
Butz was born in LaFayette, Alabama, on June 23, 1950, and soon moved with his family to Illinois. He played high school football at Maine South High School in Park Ridge, Illinois, where he was two-time high school All-American. He also played basketball and was the Illinois High School discus champion, setting a state record. He was the nephew of Earl Butz, a Purdue University professor who later served as United States secretary of agriculture.

== College football ==
Butz played college football at Purdue University, where he was a 1972 finalist for the Lombardi Award. He was a first-team All-Big Ten member and played in both the East-West Shrine Game and Senior Bowl, where he was named the Defensive MVP.

Butz was named to the Purdue Boilermakers' Intercollegiate Athletics Hall of Fame in 2004. He was later also named to Purdue's All Time Football team and was elected to the College Football Hall of Fame in 2014.

== Professional football ==
Butz was selected in the first round (fifth overall) of the 1973 NFL draft by the St. Louis Cardinals, where he would play for two seasons. In 1975, Butz was granted free agency due to a mistake in his contract that he had signed as a rookie in 1973. Redskins coach George Allen quickly signed him, but the NFL ruled that the Redskins had to compensate the Cardinals with two first-round draft picks (1977 & 1978) and a second-round pick (1978).

Butz then played for the Washington Redskins for 14 years, where he had three Super Bowl appearances: defeating the Miami Dolphins in Super Bowl XVII, losing to the Los Angeles Raiders in Super Bowl XVIII, and winning Super Bowl XXII over the Denver Broncos. At the victory parade after Super Bowl XXII, he famously shouted to the crowd, "We came, we saw, we kicked their butts."

As of 2022, Butz ranks fifth in franchise history in sacks (59.0, was third in 2008). He was a one-time Pro Bowler in 1983 in a season in which he managed eleven sacks, a career-best. He was named to the NFL All-Pro team in 1983 and 1984. He only missed four games in his entire 16-year career. Butz was among the largest players in the NFL when he played standing 6' 8" and routinely weighing around 300 pounds.

In October 1987, Butz famously checked himself out of the hospital to play in the Redskins' game against the New York Jets. Despite having dropped from 313 to 287 pounds due to the illness and feeling dizzy in the second half, Butz made a game-saving sack of Ken O'Brien to stop a Jets' drive late in the game and was awarded the game ball. After the game, he checked himself back into the hospital where he remained until the following Wednesday.

In 1988, Butz played in his 197th game for the Washington franchise, passing Len Hauss to set a franchise record for games played. He would later retire at 203 games played for Washington.

Butz announced his retirement as an active player at the age of 38 on May 18, 1989. He appeared in 216 NFL games, 191 as a starter, from 1973 to 1988. He tallied 64 sacks in his career. When he retired, he was the oldest starting player in the NFL.

Butz was selected to the NFL 1980s All-Decade Team. He was named one of the 70 Greatest Redskins at the Redskins' 70th anniversary in 2002. His name is also featured along with that of other notable players in team history on the "Ring of Fame" at FedExField.

== Personal life and death ==
Butz moved to Belleville, Illinois, early in his NFL career and continued to reside in the area for the remainder of his life with his wife, Candyce; the couple had three children. He also had a home in Fairfax, Virginia.

In the early 2000s, Butz served as a board member for the National Rifle Association of America.

Butz died in Swansea, Illinois, on November 4, 2022, at age 72.
