= Mike Nelms =

American gridiron football player (born 1955)

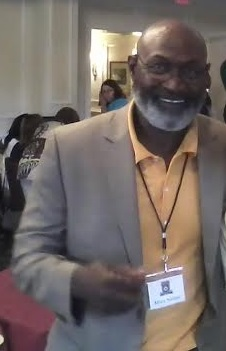

No. 21
- Position: Defensive back / Kick returner / Punt returner

Personal information
- Born: April 8, 1955 (age 71); Fort Worth, Texas, U.S.
- Listed height: 6 ft 1 in (1.85 m)
- Listed weight: 188 lb (85 kg)

Career information
- High school: Fort Worth (TX) Wyatt
- College: Baylor
- NFL draft: 1977: 7th round, 170 (By the Buffalo Bills)th overall pick

Career history
- Hamilton Tiger-Cats (1977); Ottawa Rough Riders (1977–1979); Washington Redskins (1980–1984)

Awards and highlights
- Super Bowl champion (XVII); First-team All-Pro (1983); 3× Second-team All-Pro (1980–1982); 3× Pro Bowl (1980–1982); CFL All-Star (1979); NFL 1980s All-Decade Team; 70 Greatest Redskins

Career NFL statistics
- Kickoff return yards: 4,128
- Punt return yards: 1,948
- Touchdowns: 2
- Stats at Pro Football Reference

Michael Craig Nelms (born April 8, 1955) is an American former professional football player who was a defensive back and kick returner in the National Football League (NFL) for five seasons with the Washington Redskins from 1980 to 1984. Before his NFL career, Nelms played in the Canadian Football League (CFL). He played college football for the Baylor Bears.

== College career ==
Nelms began his college career at Sam Houston State in 1973. He then transferred to Baylor University, where he played for the Bears under head coach Grant Taeff. Nelms played defensive back in college and also returned kicks on occasion. During his college career at Baylor, he only returned a handful of kicks, but he did have one interception

== Professional career ==
Nelms began his professional career after being drafted in the seventh round of the 1977 NFL Draft by the Buffalo Bills. He was the last cut in training camp. He then signed with the Hamilton Tiger-Cats of the CFL in 1977. Later that year, he was optioned to the Ottawa Rough Riders.

Nelms was a three-time Pro Bowler in 1980, 1981 and 1982. He led the NFL in yards per kickoff return twice (1981, 1982) and was the Redskins starting punt returner in Super Bowl XVII. In Super Bowl XVII, he returned six punts for 52 yards, both Super Bowl records, along with two kickoff returns for 44 yards.

Nelms finished his five seasons with 175 kickoff returns for 4,128 yards, 212 punt returns for 1,948 yards and two touchdowns, and one interception in 68 games. Nelms earned his interception in a 30–17 loss to the San Francisco 49ers and the expense of 49ers quarterback Joe Montana.

== After football ==
Mike formerly owned Champion Chevrolet Toyota in Culpeper, Virginia. His son, Kirkland, received a scholarship to play at University of Massachusetts Amherst. Nelms also has three daughters, who each went on to play collegiate athletics, including Kurstin Nelms, who ran track for Columbia University.

In 2017, Mike Nelms was inducted into the D.C. Sports Hall of Fame. He joined Redskins legends Mark Moseley, Art Monk, Chris Hanburger, Ken Houston, Darrell Green, and Russ Grimm. Other members of the hall include Olympic swimmer Katie Ledecky, Tony Kornheiser, and former Capitals play-by-play announcer Ron Weber.
