= Super Bowl XVII =

1983 Edition of the Super Bowl

| Miami Dolphins (2) (AFC) (7–2) | Washington Redskins (1) (NFC) (8–1) |
|---|---|
| 17 | 27 |
| Head coach: Don Shula | Head coach: Joe Gibbs |
| | 1 | 2 | 3 | 4 | Total |
|---|---|---|---|---|---|
| MIA | 7 | 10 | 0 | 0 | 17 |
| WAS | 0 | 10 | 3 | 14 | 27 |
- Date: January 30, 1983
- Kickoff time: 3:17 p.m. PST (UTC-8)
- Stadium: Rose Bowl; Pasadena, California
- MVP: John Riggins, fullback
- Favorite: Dolphins by 3
- Referee: Jerry Markbreit
- Attendance: 103,667

Ceremonies
- National anthem: Leslie Easterbrook
- Coin toss: Elroy Hirsch
- Halftime show: Bob Jani Productions presents "KaleidoSUPERscope" with the Los Angeles Super Drill Team and the Los Angeles Unified School District All City Marching Band starring Tammy Aadnesen.

TV in the United States
- Network: NBC
- Announcers: Dick Enberg and Merlin Olsen
- Nielsen ratings: 48.6 (est. 81.77 million viewers)
- Market share: 69
- Cost of 30-second commercial: $400,000

Radio in the United States
- Network: CBS Radio
- Announcers: Jack Buck and Hank Stram

Super Bowl XVII was an American football game between the American Football Conference (AFC) champion Miami Dolphins and the National Football Conference (NFC) champion Washington Redskins to decide the National Football League (NFL) champion for the strike-shortened 1982 season. The Redskins defeated the Dolphins, 27–17, to win their first Super Bowl and first NFL championship since 1942. The game was played on January 30, 1983, at the Rose Bowl in Pasadena, California.

This Super Bowl came at the end of a season that was significantly shortened by a players' strike. Teams ended up only playing nine regular season games, and the league conducted a special 16-team, four-round playoff tournament where divisions were ignored in the seeding. The Redskins had an NFC-best 8–1 regular season record, while the Dolphins finished at 7–2. Both teams advanced through the first three postseason rounds to Super Bowl XVII. The game then became a rematch of Super Bowl VII, also played in the Los Angeles area at the Los Angeles Memorial Coliseum ten years before, where the Dolphins completed their 17–0 perfect season at the Redskins’ expense by a 14–7 score. This was also the second Super Bowl to rematch teams, the first being Super Bowl XIII, and the first one where the previous losing team won.

The first half was competitive and ended with the Dolphins leading, 17–10. This was the third Super Bowl where the losing team was ahead at halftime and the second where they were ahead at the start of the fourth quarter. However, the Redskins scored 17 unanswered points in the second half and gained a Super Bowl record 276 yards on the ground while holding the Dolphins to just 47 offensive plays for 176 total yards, 76 of which came on a single play. Nevertheless, Miami built a 17–10 halftime lead with Jimmy Cefalo's 76-yard touchdown catch and Fulton Walker's 98-yard kickoff return. The turning point in the game came with 10:10 remaining: trailing, 17–13, and facing fourth down and one yard to go at the Dolphins' 43-yard line, Washington running back John Riggins broke through the Miami defense and ran into the end zone for a touchdown to take the lead. Wide receiver Charlie Brown then added an insurance touchdown with a 6-yard scoring reception.

Riggins was named Super Bowl MVP, finishing the game with two new Super Bowl records: the most rushing yards (166) and the most rushing attempts (38) in a Super Bowl game. He was the first player from an NFC team to rush for 100 yards in a Super Bowl. Riggins also recorded a reception for 15 yards, giving him more total yards from scrimmage (181) than the entire Miami team.

== Background ==
=== Host selection process ===
The NFL awarded Super Bowl XVII to Pasadena on March 13, 1979, at the owners' meetings in Honolulu. For the first time, three Super Bowl host cities were deliberated and selected at the same meeting (XV, XVI, and XVII). A total of eight cities submitted bids: New Orleans, Detroit (Silverdome), Pasadena (Rose Bowl), Los Angeles (Coliseum), Miami, Seattle (Kingdome), Dallas (Cotton Bowl), and Houston (Rice Stadium). Pasadena was selected for their third Super Bowl overall. New Orleans (XV) and Detroit (XVI) were other cities chosen at the meeting.

After hosting five previous Super Bowls, Miami was noticeably left out of the bidding process, largely due the aging condition of the Orange Bowl, and for a hotel room mix-up at Super Bowl XIII two months earlier. Dolphins owner Joe Robbie, locked in an ongoing feud with the city of Miami and Dade County over stadium improvements or construction of a new stadium, actually lobbied against Miami hosting the game. Robbie convinced the other owners to vote down Miami, in an effort to gain leverage towards building a new stadium. South Florida would not be selected to host another Super Bowl until Joe Robbie Stadium was built, and it hosted XXIII.

This was the first outdoor Super Bowl to have a Jumbotron present. A temporary Sony Diamond Vision screen was installed in northeast corner of the stadium just above the last row seats. The only other Super Bowl facilities to date which had replay screens were indoors: the Louisiana Superdome in New Orleans (XII and XV), and the Pontiac Silverdome near Detroit (XVI).

=== NFL players’ strike ===
A 57-day-long players' strike reduced the 1982 regular season from a 16-game schedule to 9 games. Because of the shortened season, the NFL adopted a special 16-team playoff tournament. Division standings were ignored. Eight teams from each conference were seeded 1–8 based on their regular season records.

The modified schedule forced the league to extend the regular season into January for the first time. After the 57-day strike, the NFL extended the regular season one weekend (pushing the end of the regular season back from December 26 to January 2), moving back the start of the playoffs and eliminating the week off for the first time since Super Bowl IV.

Four teams that made the playoffs the previous year failed to do so in the strike-shortened season, even with the greatly expanded postseason field. The San Francisco 49ers, the defending Super Bowl champions, struggled to a 3–6 record. The Buffalo Bills, New York Giants, and Philadelphia Eagles also did not qualify for the playoffs. However, the Cleveland Browns and Detroit Lions did qualify for the playoffs with 4–5 records, becoming the first teams in NFL history to compete in postseason play despite regular-season winning percentages below .500. No other losing teams would do so until the Seattle Seahawks reached the playoffs following the 2010 season, becoming the first team to accomplish this in a season unaffected by a strike. The 2014 Carolina Panthers, 2020 Washington team, and 2022 Tampa Bay Buccaneers also achieved playoff berths with winning percentages below .500 in seasons not shortened by a players' strike.

=== Miami Dolphins ===
The Dolphins finished the strike-shortened regular season with a 7–2 record, ranking them second in the AFC. The Miami club's main strength was its defense, nicknamed the "Killer Bees" because six of the defense's 11 starters had surnames that began with the letter B. The "Killer Bees", anchored by Pro Bowl defensive tackle Bob Baumhower, allowed the fewest total yards in the league (2,312) and the fewest passing yards in the league (1,027). Linebacker A. J. Duhe was extremely effective at blitzing and in pass coverage. The Dolphins' secondary, consisting of defensive backs Don McNeal, Gerald Small and brothers Lyle and Glenn Blackwood, combined for 11 interceptions.

However, Miami's passing attack, led by quarterback David Woodley, ranked second to last in the league with 1,314 total yards, 8 touchdowns and 13 interceptions. One of the few bright spots in the Dolphins' passing attack was wide receiver Jimmy Cefalo, who gained 356 yards from just 17 receptions for an average of 20.9 yards per catch. Wide receiver Duriel Harris also provided a deep threat with 22 receptions for 331 yards.

Miami's strength on offense was its ground game, ranking third in the league with 1,344 rushing yards. Pro Bowl running back Andra Franklin was the team's top rusher with 701 yards (third in the NFL) and seven touchdowns. Running back Tony Nathan rushed for 233 yards and caught 16 passes for another 114 yards. Woodley himself also rushed for 207 yards and two touchdowns. One reason for the Dolphins' rushing success was the blocking of their offensive line, led by future Hall of Fame center Dwight Stephenson, along with Pro Bowlers Bob Kuechenberg (a starter on Miami's early 1970s Super Bowl teams) and Ed Newman.

=== Washington Redskins ===
Super Bowl XVII was the Redskins' first Super Bowl victory (third NFL championship overall) and their second Super Bowl appearance; they were defeated by the Dolphins, 14–7, in Super Bowl VII. This was the second rematch in Super Bowl history (the first being the Pittsburgh Steelers and the Dallas Cowboys in Super Bowls X and XIII). Washington finished the strike-shortened regular season with an NFC-best 8–1 record, earning their first playoff appearance in six years and allowing the fewest points (128) in the league.

Redskins quarterback Joe Theismann finished the season as the top rated passer in the NFC, completing 161 of 252 (63 percent) pass attempts for 2,033 yards and 13 touchdowns, while also rushing for 150 yards. The main weapons in the passing game were wide receivers Charlie Brown (32 receptions, 690 yards and 8 touchdowns) and Art Monk (35 receptions, 447 yards and one touchdown). Running back John Riggins led the Redskins’ ground game, rushing for 553 yards and three touchdowns during the regular season. Much of Washington's success on offense was attributed to their offensive line, affectionately known as "The Hogs".

Washington also had impact players on special teams. Mark Moseley became the first placekicker to win the NFL Most Valuable Player Award, converting 20 of 21 field goal attempts and all 18 of his extra point attempts. Kick returner Mike Nelms gained a combined total of 809 yards returning kickoffs and punts.

The Redskins' defense was led by 6'7", 296-pound defensive tackle Dave Butz, who anchored the line, along with defensive ends Dexter Manley and Tony McGee, who each recorded 6.5 sacks. Washington's secondary was led by defensive backs Vernon Dean and former Dolphin Jeris White, who each recorded three interceptions.

=== Playoffs ===
The Dolphins advanced through the special 16-team playoffs by defeating the New England Patriots, 28–13, the San Diego Chargers, 34–13, and the New York Jets, 14–0, earning a trip to the Super Bowl for the fourth time.

Meanwhile, the Redskins defeated the Detroit Lions, 31–7, the Minnesota Vikings, 21–7, and the Dallas Cowboys, 31–17.

Before the playoffs, the 33-year-old Riggins, who had averaged barely three yards per carry during the season, told coach Joe Gibbs "I'm really getting down the road. I don't have many of these left. I've been out two weeks and I'm ready. Give me the ball." Gibbs did just that, and Riggins ran for a combined total of 444 yards and three touchdowns during those playoff victories.

Another key contributor in the NFC playoffs was backup wide receiver Alvin Garrett, who replaced Monk after he suffered a leg injury that kept him out of the entire postseason. Although he only recorded one reception during the entire regular season, Garrett caught a total of 13 receptions for 231 yards and four touchdowns in Washington's three conference playoff games.

=== Super Bowl pre-game news ===
Entering Super Bowl XVII, the Dolphins were favored to win, primarily because of their "Killer Bees" defense. It had recorded 12 interceptions in three AFC playoff games, including five each in the final two contests. Another reason was because 26 players on Washington's 45-man roster had been signed by the team as free agents, including 14 who had never been drafted by any NFL team. Only ten players on the Redskins roster had any prior playoff experience.

As was the case in Super Bowl VII, the Redskins were the designated home team. However, the Redskins chose to wear their white jerseys and burgundy pants for the game; in their previous Super Bowl loss to Miami, the Redskins were required to wear their burgundy and gold uniforms as the home team. Washington, which began wearing white at home regularly in 1981 following Gibbs' arrival, became the second team after the 1978 Dallas Cowboys to wear white as the home team in a Super Bowl. The Dolphins wore their aqua jerseys and white pants.

This was the first Super Bowl where both teams wore a face mask color other than gray. The Redskins switched to gold masks in 1978 and the Dolphins to aqua in 1980.

== Broadcasting ==
=== United States ===
The game was televised in the United States by NBC. In the broadcast booth was Dick Enberg handling the play-by-play duties and color commentator Merlin Olsen. Len Berman and his NFL '82 castmates, Mike Adamle (who also covered the Vince Lombardi Trophy presentation ceremony), Ahmad Rashad and Pete Axthelm anchored the pregame, halftime and postgame coverage. Locally, for each of their home teams, it was seen on local NBC affiliates WRC-TV in Washington, D.C. and WCKT-TV (whose callsign would become WSVN later that summer; it is now a Fox station since January 1, 1989) in Miami, and for their home field it was seen on KNBC in Los Angeles.

The game was broadcast nationally on radio on CBS, with Jack Buck handling the play-by-play duties and color commentator Hank Stram in the broadcast booth. Brent Musburger anchored the pregame, halftime, and postgame coverage with analysis from Irv Cross, Dick Stockton and Jimmy "The Greek" Snyder for CBS. Locally, Super Bowl XVII was broadcast on WMAL-AM in Washington, D.C. by Frank Herzog, Sam Huff and Sonny Jurgensen, and on WIOD-AM in Miami, Florida by Rick Weaver and Hank Goldberg.

NBC's national Nielsen rating of 48.6 was the second-highest for a Super Bowl broadcast, trailing only the 49.1 garnered by Super Bowl XVI on CBS the year before. NBC introduced a new theme for the game; a brass-based piece that would see usage in various forms (as game introduction; pregame introduction or bumper music) for most of the remainder of the decade.

Following the game, NBC aired the premiere episode of The A-Team, beginning the regular tradition of the game's host network airing significant Super Bowl lead-out programs. As a way to hype the show for NBC, Mr. T was in attendance for the game.

The game is featured on NFL's Greatest Games under the title Hog Day Afternoon, narrated by John Facenda and featuring interviews with Joe Bugel and radio commentary by Herzog, Jurgensen and Huff.

=== International ===
The Super Bowl was shown live in Canada on CTV, which also simulcasted NBC's coverage. In Mexico it was broadcast, with NBC's signal, live at Rose Bowl Stadium by Televisa Channel 5 XHGC. The game was also shown live in the UK for the first time when Channel 4, Britain's newest channel (launched November 2, 1982) covered it.

== Entertainment ==
Super Bowl XVII was dedicated to University of Alabama coach Bear Bryant, who had died four days earlier. A moment of silence was held in his memory during the pregame ceremonies. Dolphins Tony Nathan, Dwight Stephenson, Bob Baumhower and Don McNeal were All-Americans for Bryant at Alabama, and Redskins reserve running back Wilbur Jackson was the first African-American to earn a football scholarship to Alabama.

The Los Angeles Unified School District All-City Band played during the pregame ceremonies. Later, actress Leslie Easterbrook performed the national anthem. Easterbrook almost missed the ceremony, saying, "the limo driver couldn’t find the Rose Bowl in Pasadena. When I finally got there I ran through that tunnel by myself and actually slid, as if I was diving for first base. I slid into the microphone and they had 60 seconds of silence for the passing of a football coach from Alabama. I caught my breath and did it."

The coin toss ceremony featured Pro Football Hall of Fame receiver Elroy Hirsch. Dolphins captain Bob Kuechenberg called "tails," and the coin landed "tails." However, referee Jerry Markbreit became confused by the similar design of both sides of the coin and incorrectly thought "heads" had landed. After a short discussion with his head linesman, Dale Hamer, Markbreit corrected his mistake before the kickoff, then asked Kuechenberg if the Dolphins would receive said kickoff, which they did. Justin Peters of Slate, who watched all the Super Bowls over a two-month period in 2015 before Super Bowl 50, reported what transpired: “Tails is the call,” said Markbreit. “Heads,” he said after the coin had dropped. “No, it’s tails, it’s tails,” everyone then said. “Whoop!” Markbreit said, bending down before announcing “Tails!” “So some confusion over what is heads and what is tails,” Dick Enberg said. Peters called it one of the funniest of all Super Bowl moments.

The halftime show was produced by Bob Jani Productions and titled "KaleidoSUPERscope", and featured the Los Angeles Super Drill Team.

== Game summary ==
=== First quarter ===
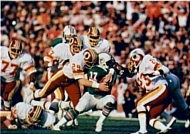
Redskins safety Mark Murphy tackling Dolphins running back Andra Franklin.

After both teams exchanged punts on their first possessions to start the game, Miami scored first on their second possession in two plays from their own 20-yard line. Running back Tony Nathan first picked up 4 yards, and then quarterback David Woodley (at 24 years, 3 months, and 5 days old was the youngest quarterback to start a Super Bowl at the time) froze Washington defensive end Dexter Manley with a pump fake before throwing the ball to wide receiver Jimmy Cefalo, who caught the ball ahead of single coverage by safety Tony Peters at the Redskins 45 and raced untouched down the right sideline for a 76-yard touchdown completion. After the Dolphins forced the Redskins to punt, Miami reached the Washington 37 on their next drive, and Woodley attempted another deep pass, but before he could throw the ball, he was hit by Manley, causing Woodley to fumble, and defensive tackle Dave Butz recovered the ball at the Miami 46. The turnover led to Redskins kicker Mark Moseley's 31-yard field goal to cut the Dolphins' lead to 7–3, two plays into the second quarter.

=== Second quarter ===
Dolphins cornerback/kick returner Fulton Walker returned the ensuing kickoff 42 yards to the Dolphins 47-yard line. From there, the Dolphins advanced to the Redskins 3-yard line. Woodley's pass fell incomplete on third down, however, so Miami had to settle for kicker Uwe von Schamann's 20-yard field goal to increase their lead to 10–3 with 6 minutes left in the half. Although the drive was only 50 yards long, it consisted of 13 plays and took 8:39 off the clock.

Aided by a 27-yard completion from quarterback Joe Theismann to tight end Rick Walker, 13 rushing yards, a 15-yard reception by fullback John Riggins, and a 12-yard run by Theismann himself, the Redskins marched 80 yards in 11 plays to score on wide receiver Alvin Garrett's 4-yard touchdown reception, tying the game, 10–10, with less than 2 minutes left in the half.

However, the tie was immediately broken by the Dolphins. Fulton Walker returned the subsequent kickoff 98 yards for a touchdown to give Miami a 17–10 lead. It was the first kickoff return touchdown in a Super Bowl and the longest kickoff return in NFL postseason history, breaking the prior record of 97 yards by Vic Washington of San Francisco vs. Dallas in a 1972 NFC divisional playoff.

An illegal blocking penalty on Washington during the kickoff forced them to start their next drive at their own 7-yard line, but they managed to get to the 28 after their first four plays. A pass interference penalty on safety Lyle Blackwood on the next play moved the ball to the Miami 42-yard line. Immediately after Blackwood's penalty, wide receiver Charlie Brown's 26-yard reception advanced the Redskins to the Dolphins 16. After calling their final timeout with 14 seconds left, Washington made one last attempt to score a touchdown before trying a field goal. Theismann's subsequent pass was caught by Garrett, but he was tackled at the 7-yard line by safety Glenn Blackwood (Lyle Blackwood's younger brother) before he could get out of bounds, preventing any possible field goal attempt as the Redskins were unable to stop the clock before time expired in the half, keeping the Dolphins' lead at 17–10.

=== Third quarter ===
The teams opened the second half trading punts, but on their second possession of the third quarter, following an 11-yard reception by tight end Don Warren, the Redskins managed to fool the Dolphins with a reverse play near midfield. Riggins took a handoff from Theismann and then handed the ball off to Garrett, who was running in the opposite direction. The play worked perfectly, as Garrett ran the ball 44 yards to Miami's 9-yard line. The Dolphins' defense only allowed Washington to advance to the 3-yard line on their next three plays, though, so the Redskins settled for another 20-yard field goal by Moseley to cut their deficit to 17–13.

After the next three possessions ended in punts, Theismann was intercepted by Miami linebacker A. J. Duhe at the Washington 47-yard line. The Dolphins reached the 37 when Woodley tried to pass the ball deep to Cefalo again. However, Redskins cornerback Vernon Dean deflected the ball and safety Mark Murphy made a one-handed interception at the 5-yard line while falling to the ground. After Washington got a first down to advance to their own 18, Miami defensive end Kim Bokamper deflected a pass from a scrambling and retreating Theismann. Bokamper nearly intercepted the pass for a touchdown just outside of the Redskins' end zone, but Theismann prevented the score with a timely move, knocking the ball out of Bokamper's hands. Following the near disaster for Washington, running back Clarence Harmon picked up a first down for the Redskins with a 12-yard run to the 30 before the period ended.

=== Fourth quarter ===
The Redskins then drove to Miami's 43-yard line and once again tried a trick play, this time a flea flicker. Riggins took a pitch from Theismann, ran up to the line of scrimmage and pitched the ball back to Theismann, who then attempted a deep pass. This time, the Dolphins were not fooled; Lyle Blackwood made a diving interception at the 1-yard line (making this the first Super Bowl in which three consecutive drives ended with interceptions).

However, Blackwood's interception turned out to be somewhat beneficial for Washington, as it pinned Miami back at their own 1. The Dolphins could only gain three yards with their next three plays, and Washington ended up getting the ball back with great field position on their own 48-yard line. The Redskins ran three plays to reach the Miami 43, but then faced a 4th-and-1. Instead of punting, the Redskins decided to gamble and attempt to get the first down with a run from Riggins, but Riggins did a great deal more than pick up the first down. Coach Joe Gibbs called his trademark play I-Right 70 Chip, starting tight end Clint Didier in motion towards the right, then reversing motion back to the left. The concept behind the play was for the Redskins' line and skill players (except for Theismann) to block everyone but the smallest cornerback on the field, leaving Riggins able and ready to break the tackle of that player (in this case, Miami cornerback Don McNeal). Theismann handed off to Riggins, who blasted through McNeal's arms at the line of scrimmage and still built up enough speed to outrun Glenn Blackwood for a 43-yard touchdown, giving Washington their first lead of the game, 20–17, with just over 10 minutes remaining. McNeal, who was assigned to cover Didier on the play, slipped briefly as Didier changed direction. The Redskins ran the play to the left, behind Didier and running back Otis Wonsley, and Riggins ran over McNeal to score the touchdown. Even if McNeal had kept his footing, it would not have mattered much. Despite a valiant effort, the 185-pound cornerback could do little more than hold on briefly as he met the 240-pound Riggins running with a full head of steam, hit him high, and slid down his body as "The Diesel" pulled away towards the end zone.

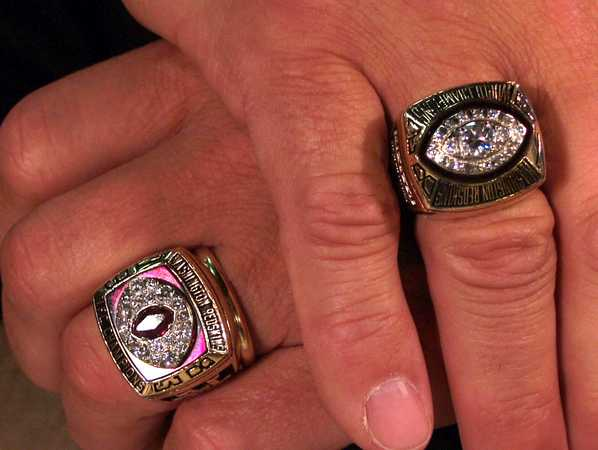
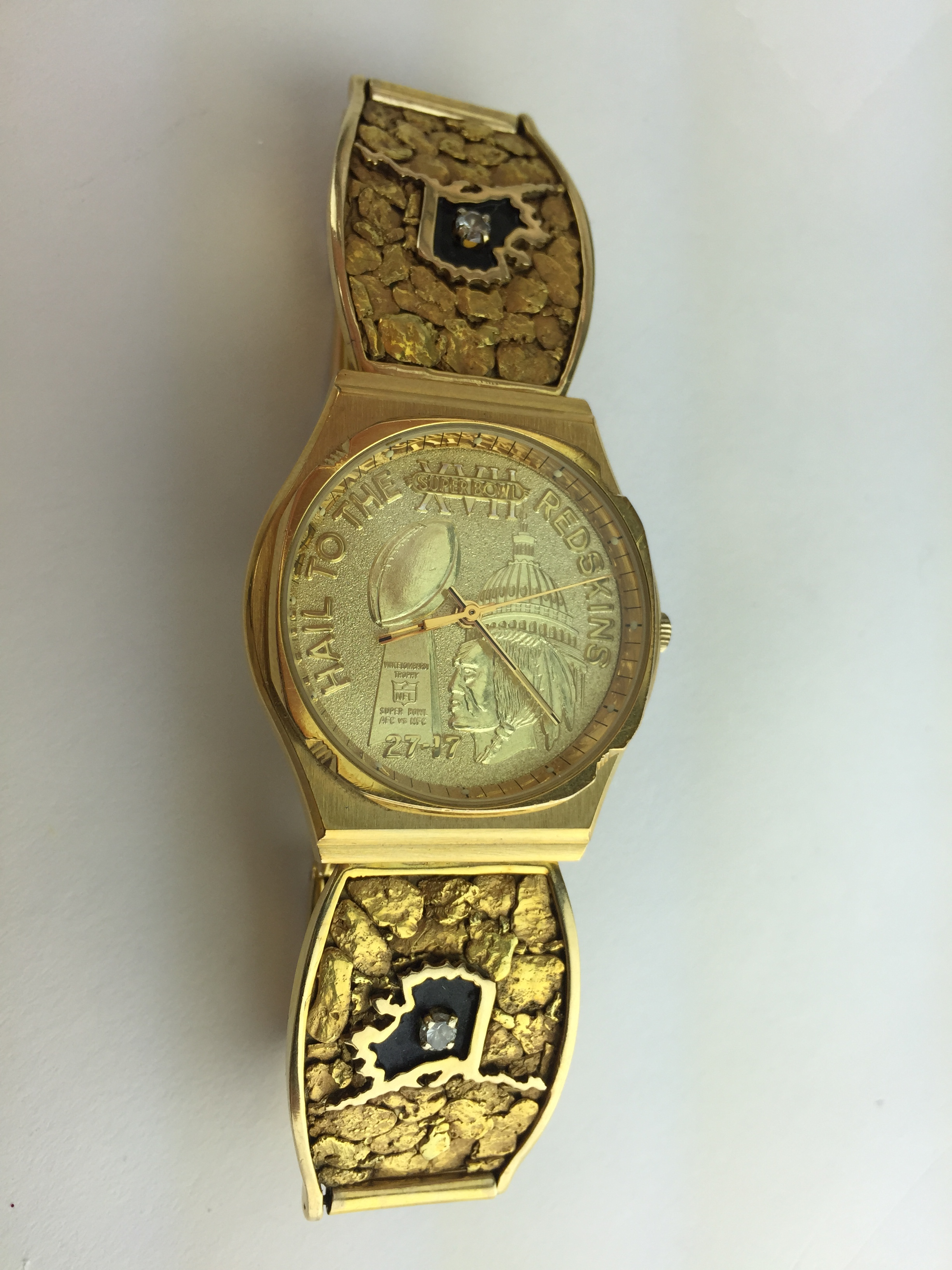
Super Bowl XVII ring (left) and watch (right) awarded to the Washington Redskins

Washington quickly forced Miami to punt on their next possession, and safety/punt returner Mike Nelms's 12-yard return gave the Redskins great field position at the Dolphins 41-yard line. The Redskins ran five consecutive running plays by Riggins, consuming a lot of time and moving the ball to the 19-yard line. On a 3rd-and-8 play, Theismann completed a key 10-yard pass to Brown for a first down at the Miami 9. Riggins advanced the ball three more yards on two more carries to reach the two-minute warning, at which point Theismann completed a 6-yard touchdown pass to Brown, giving Washington a 27–17 lead and essentially putting the game away. Fulton Walker returned the ensuing kickoff 36 yards to the 35-yard line, but the Dolphins could only advance to the 39 before turning the ball over on downs with 1:12 remaining, enabling the Redskins to run out the clock and claim their first Super Bowl title.

Washington dominated the second half, allowing no pass completions and 34 rushing yards; Miami's longest gain of the game's final 30 minutes went for just nine yards. The Dolphins managed only nine first downs in the entire game, with just two in the second half. "Their way is what we called Dolphin football," said left guard Bob Kuechenberg, one of only two holdovers from Miami's three previous Super Bowl teams in the 1970s (the other was defensive end Vern Den Herder who retired immediately following the game). "They controlled the second half and they're fitting world champions.

Woodley's poor performance in this game — four pass completions in 14 attempts for 97 yards, a touchdown, an interception and a lost fumble — was a factor in the Dolphins drafting Dan Marino three months later. After his 76-yard touchdown catch in the first quarter, Cefalo caught just one more pass for six yards. Duriel Harris recorded Miami's other two receptions in the game for a total of 15 yards. Woodley did not complete a pass in the final 40 minutes of play, notching his last completion of the day a few minutes into the second quarter. Walker finished with four kickoff returns for 190 yards and a touchdown, setting Super Bowl records for most kickoff return yards and highest single-game yards-per-return average (47.5).

Meanwhile, Theismann, the first starting quarterback to win a Super Bowl while wearing a single-digit uniform number (7), finished 15 of 23 for 143 yards, two touchdowns and two interceptions. He also added 20 rushing yards on three carries. Brown was the Redskins' leading receiver with six receptions for 60 yards and a touchdown. Nelms returned 6 punts for 52 yards, both Super Bowl records, and returned two kickoffs for 44 yards.

Overall, Washington gained 400 yards of offense — including a Super Bowl-record 276 rushing yards — while limiting Miami to 176 total yards.

About Super Bowl XVII, Justin Peters commented, "Super Bowl XVII capped off a strike-shortened season, and, as a result, the players seemed much better rested than usual, and the game was much more energetic than some of its predecessors."

=== Box score ===
Super Bowl XVII: Washington Redskins 27, Miami Dolphins 17

| Quarter | 1 | 2 | 3 | 4 | Total |
|---|---|---|---|---|---|
| Dolphins (AFC) | 7 | 10 | 0 | 0 | 17 |
| Redskins (NFC) | 0 | 10 | 3 | 14 | 27 |

at Rose Bowl, Pasadena, California

- Date: January 30, 1983
- Game time: 3:17 p.m. PST
- Game weather: 61 °F (16.1 °C), sunny

Scoring summary

| Quarter | Time | Drive | | | Team | Scoring information | Score | |
| Quarter | Time | Plays | Yards | TOP | Team | Scoring information | MIA | WAS |
|---|---|---|---|---|---|---|---|---|
| 1 | 8:11 | 2 | 80 | 0:55 | MIA | Jimmy Cefalo 76-yard touchdown reception from David Woodley, Uwe von Schamann kick good | 7 | 0 |
| 2 | 14:39 | 7 | 32 | 4:16 | WAS | 31-yard field goal by Mark Moseley | 7 | 3 |
| 2 | 6:00 | 13 | 50 | 8:39 | MIA | 20-yard field goal by von Schamann | 10 | 3 |
| 2 | 1:51 | 11 | 80 | 4:09 | WAS | Alvin Garrett 4-yard touchdown reception from Joe Theismann, Moseley kick good | 10 | 10 |
| 2 | 1:38 | — | — | — | MIA | Fulton Walker 98-yard kickoff return for a touchdown, von Schamann kick good | 17 | 10 |
| 3 | 8:09 | 6 | 61 | 3:08 | WAS | 20-yard field goal by Moseley | 17 | 13 |
| 4 | 10:01 | 4 | 52 | 1:42 | WAS | John Riggins 43-yard touchdown run, Moseley kick good | 17 | 20 |
| 4 | 1:55 | 12 | 41 | 6:54 | WAS | Charlie Brown 6-yard touchdown reception from Theismann, Moseley kick good | 17 | 27 |
| "TOP" = time of possession. For other American football terms, see Glossary of American football. | | | | | | | 17 | 27 |

== Final statistics ==
Sources: NFL.com Super Bowl XVII, Super Bowl XVII Play Finder Mia, Super Bowl XVII Play Finder Was

=== Statistical comparison ===
| | Miami Dolphins | Washington Redskins |
|---|---|---|
| First downs | 9 | 24 |
| First downs rushing | 7 | 14 |
| First downs passing | 2 | 9 |
| First downs penalty | 0 | 1 |
| Third down efficiency | 3/11 | 11/18 |
| Fourth down efficiency | 0/1 | 1/1 |
| Net yards rushing | 96 | 276 |
| Rushing attempts | 29 | 52 |
| Yards per rush | 3.3 | 5.3 |
| Passing – Completions/attempts | 4/17 | 15/23 |
| Times sacked-total yards | 1–17 | 3–19 |
| Interceptions thrown | 1 | 2 |
| Net yards passing | 80 | 124 |
| Total net yards | 176 | 400 |
| Punt returns-total yards | 2–22 | 6–52 |
| Kickoff returns-total yards | 6–222 | 3–57 |
| Interceptions-total return yards | 2–0 | 1–0 |
| Punts-average yardage | 6–37.8 | 4–42.0 |
| Fumbles-lost | 2–1 | 0–0 |
| Penalties-total yards | 4–55 | 5–36 |
| Time of possession | 23:45 | 36:15 |
| Turnovers | 2 | 2 |

=== Individual statistics ===
Dolphins passing
| | C/ATT^{1} | Yds | TD | INT | Rating |
|---|---|---|---|---|---|
| David Woodley | 4/14 | 97 | 1 | 1 | 50.0 |
| Don Strock | 0/3 | 0 | 0 | 0 | 39.6 |
Dolphins rushing
| | Att^{2} | Yds | TD | LG^{3} | Yds/Att |
| Andra Franklin | 16 | 49 | 0 | 9 | 3.06 |
| Tony Nathan | 7 | 26 | 0 | 12 | 3.71 |
| David Woodley | 4 | 16 | 0 | 7 | 4.00 |
| Tommy Vigorito | 1 | 4 | 0 | 4 | 4.00 |
| Duriel Harris | 1 | 1 | 0 | 1 | 1.00 |
Dolphins receiving
| | Rec^{4} | Yds | TD | LG^{3} | Target^{5} |
| Jimmy Cefalo | 2 | 82 | 1 | 76 | 5 |
| Duriel Harris | 2 | 15 | 0 | 8 | 7 |
| Tommy Vigorito | 0 | 0 | 0 | 0 | 2 |
| Nat Moore | 0 | 0 | 0 | 0 | 1 |
| Tony Nathan | 0 | 0 | 0 | 0 | 1 |
| Joe Rose | 0 | 0 | 0 | 0 | 1 |

Redskins passing
| | C/ATT^{1} | Yds | TD | INT | Rating |
|---|---|---|---|---|---|
| Joe Theismann | 15/23 | 143 | 2 | 2 | 75.1 |
Redskins rushing
| | Att^{2} | Yds | TD | LG^{3} | Yds/Att |
| John Riggins | 38 | 166 | 1 | 43 | 4.37 |
| Alvin Garrett | 1 | 44 | 0 | 44 | 44.00 |
| Clarence Harmon | 9 | 40 | 0 | 12 | 4.44 |
| Joe Theismann | 3 | 20 | 0 | 12 | 6.67 |
| Rick Walker | 1 | 6 | 0 | 6 | 6.00 |
Redskins receiving
| | Rec^{4} | Yds | TD | LG^{3} | Target^{5} |
| Charlie Brown | 6 | 60 | 1 | 26 | 10 |
| Don Warren | 5 | 28 | 0 | 10 | 6 |
| Alvin Garrett | 2 | 13 | 1 | 9 | 4 |
| Rick Walker | 1 | 27 | 0 | 27 | 1 |
| John Riggins | 1 | 15 | 0 | 15 | 1 |

^{1}Completions/attempts ^{2}Rushing attempts ^{3}Long gain ^{4}Receptions ^{5}Times targeted

=== Records set ===
The following records were set in Super Bowl XVII, according to the official NFL.com boxscore and the Pro-Football-Reference.com game summary.
Some records have to meet NFL minimum number of attempts to be recognized. The minimums are shown (in parentheses).

Player records set
| Longest scoring play | 98-yard kickoff return | Fulton Walker (Miami) |
Rushing records
| Most yards, game | 166 | John Riggins (Washington) |
| Most attempts, game | 38 | John Riggins (Washington) |
| Longest rushing touchdown | 43 yards | John Riggins (Washington) |
Combined yardage records ^{†}
| Most attempts, game | 39 | John Riggins |
| Most yards gained, game | 190 | Fulton Walker |
Special teams
| Longest kickoff return | 98 yards | Fulton Walker |
| Most kickoff return yards, game | 190 | Fulton Walker |
| Highest kickoff return average, game (3 returns) | 47.5 yards (4–190) | Fulton Walker |
| Highest kickoff return average, career (4 returns) | 47.5 yards (4–190) | Fulton Walker |
| Most kickoff returns for touchdowns, game | 1 | Fulton Walker |
| Most punt returns, game | 6 | Mike Nelms (Washington) |
| Most punt return yards gained, game | 52 | Mike Nelms (Washington) |
| Most punt return yards gained, career | 52 | Mike Nelms (Washington) |
| Highest average, punt return yardage, career (4 returns) | 8.7 yards (6–52) | Mike Nelms (Washington) |
Records tied
| Most punt returns, career | 6 | Mike Nelms |

- † This category includes rushing, receiving, interception returns, punt returns, kickoff returns, and fumble returns.

Team records set
Rushing
| Most rushing yards (net) | 276 | Redskins |
Passing
| Fewest passes completed | 4 | Dolphins |
Kickoff returns
| Most yards gained, game | 222 | Dolphins |
| Highest average gain, game (3 returns) | 37.0 yards (222–6) | Dolphins |
| Most Kickoff returns for touchdowns, game | 1 | Dolphins |
Punt returns
| Most punt returns, game | 6 | Redskins |
| Most yards gained, game | 52 | Redskins |
Records tied
| Most points, fourth quarter | 14 | Redskins |
| Most first downs | 24 | Redskins |
| Fewest points, second half | 0 | Dolphins |
| Fewest rushing touchdowns | 0 | Dolphins |
| Fewest first downs | 9 | Dolphins |

Records set, both team totals
| | Total | Redskins | Dolphins |
Rushing, Both Teams
| Most rushing attempts | 81 | 52 | 29 |
| Most rushing yards (net) | 372 | 276 | 96 |
Passing, both teams
| Fewest passes completed | 19 | 15 | 4 |
First downs, both teams
| Most first downs rushing | 21 | 14 | 7 |
Kickoff returns, Both Teams
| Most yards gained | 279 | 57 | 222 |
Punt returns, Both Teams
| Most yards gained, game | 74 | 52 | 22 |

== Starting lineups ==
Hall of Fame‡

| Miami | Position | Position | Washington |
|---|---|---|---|
Offense
| Duriel Harris | WR | | Alvin Garrett |
| Jon Giesler | LT | | Joe Jacoby |
| Bob Kuechenberg | LG | | Russ Grimm‡ |
| Dwight Stephenson‡ | C | | Jeff Bostic |
| Jeff Toews | RG | | Fred Dean |
| Eric Laakso | RT | | George Starke |
| Bruce Hardy | TE | | Don Warren |
| Jimmy Cefalo | WR | | Charlie Brown |
| David Woodley | QB | | Joe Theismann |
| Tony Nathan | RB | TE | Rick Walker |
| Andra Franklin | FB | | John Riggins‡ |
Defense
| Doug Betters | LE | | Mat Mendenhall |
| Bob Baumhower | NT | LT | Dave Butz |
| Kim Bokamper | RE | RT | Darryl Grant |
| Bob Brudzinski | LLB | RE | Dexter Manley |
| A. J. Duhe | ILB | LLB | Mel Kaufman |
| Earnie Rhone | ILB | MLB | Neal Olkewicz |
| Larry Gordon | RLB | | Rich Milot |
| Gerald Small | LCB | | Jeris White |
| Don McNeal | RCB | | Vernon Dean |
| Glenn Blackwood | SS | | Tony Peters |
| Lyle Blackwood | FS | | Mark Murphy |

== Officials ==
- Referee: Jerry Markbreit #9 first Super Bowl
- Umpire: Art Demmas #78 second Super Bowl (XIII)
- Head linesman: Dale Hamer #104 first Super Bowl
- Line judge: Bill Reynolds #53 first Super Bowl
- Back judge: Dick Hantak #105 first Super Bowl
- Side judge: Dave Parry #64 first Super Bowl
- Field judge: Don Orr #77 first Super Bowl
- Alternate: Bob McElwee #95 worked Super Bowls XXII, XXVIII, XXXIV on field
- Alternate: Burl Toler #37 worked Super Bowl XIV on field

Officials wore a black armband with number 11 in memory of side judge Vince Jacob, who died during the players' strike. Jacob had been an official since 1975. It was the first time NFL officials wore such a memorial on the field during a Super Bowl. Back judge Dick Hantak was on the same crew as Jacob (led by referee Fred Wyant) in 1981 and the first two games of 1982.
