= Fulton Walker =

American football player (1958–2016)

No. 41
- Positions: Cornerback, return specialist

Personal information
- Born: April 30, 1958; Martinsburg, West Virginia, U.S.
- Died: October 12, 2016 (aged 58); Martinsburg, West Virginia, U.S.
- Listed height: 5 ft 10 in (1.78 m)
- Listed weight: 193 lb (88 kg)

Career information
- High school: Martinsburg
- College: West Virginia
- NFL draft: 1981: 6th round, 154th overall pick

Career history
- Miami Dolphins (1981–1985); Los Angeles Raiders (1985–1986)

Career NFL statistics
- Interceptions: 5
- Return yards: 5,216
- Touchdowns: 2
- Stats at Pro Football Reference

Fulton Luther Walker Jr. (April 30, 1958 – October 12, 2016) was an American professional football player who was a cornerback for the Miami Dolphins from 1981 to 1985 and Los Angeles Raiders from 1985 to 1986 of the National Football League (NFL). He played college football for the West Virginia Mountaineers. He graduated from Martinsburg High School and West Virginia University.

== College career ==
Walker played for West Virginia from 1977 to 1980, mostly as a defensive back, though he played running back in his sophomore season. Walker recorded 194 tackles and 5 interceptions on defense, while also rushing for 392 yards and two touchdowns. His primary role on the team was as a kick returner, returning 58 punts for 675 yards and three touchdowns, along with 51 kickoff returns for 1,066 yards.

== Professional career ==
On defense, Walker recorded five interceptions during his career, which he returned for 62 yards. His main contributions came as a punt and kickoff returner on special teams, recording a total of 145 punt returns for 1,437 yards and 167 kickoff returns for 3,779 yards and a touchdown. Walker's best season was in the strike shortened nine-game season of 1982, when he recorded three interceptions on defense and 433 kickoff return yards, assisting his team to a championship appearance in Super Bowl XVII. In 1985, he recorded an NFL record 692 punt return yards. This would stand as a record until 1996 when it was surpassed by Desmond Howard's 870 yards.

Walker is best remembered for his performance on special teams in Super Bowl XVII and Super Bowl XIX. In Super Bowl XVII, Walker recorded four kickoff returns for 190 yards and a touchdown, setting Super Bowl records for most kick return yards and highest single game yards-per-return average (47.5). This included a record 98-yard kickoff return for a touchdown in the second quarter, the first kickoff ever to be returned for a touchdown in Super Bowl history. He also had a 42-yard return that set up a Dolphins field goal. His contributions helped the Dolphins maintain a lead in the game until late in the fourth quarter, despite Miami quarterback David Woodley being limited to just four completions in the entire game. In Super Bowl XIX, Walker contributed 93 kickoff return yards and 15 yards returning punts.

== Life after football ==
In honor of his special teams highlights, the West Virginia Sports Writers Association gives out the Fulton Walker Award each year to the state's top high school special teams player.

Walker was born and lived in Martinsburg, West Virginia, where he was the victim of a violent break-in at his home in August 2013. One of the men involved in the crime, during which Walker was beaten and assaulted, was sentenced to 18 years in prison.

Walker died in Martinsburg on October 12, 2016. He is one of at least 345 NFL players to be diagnosed after death with chronic traumatic encephalopathy (CTE), which is caused by repeated hits to the head.
