= Acragas =

Acragas may refer to:

- Acragas, an ancient Greek city on the site of modern Agrigento, Sicily
- Acragas (mythology), son of Zeus and the Oceanid Asterope in Greek mythology
- Acragas, a river god
- Acragas (silversmith), an engraver or chaser in silver, mentioned by Pliny the Elder
- Acragas (spider), a genus of jumping spiders
