= Akragas (disambiguation) =

Akragas may refer to:

- Akragas, an ancient Greek city on the site of modern Agrigento, Sicily
- Acragas (mythology), one of the river gods, son of Zeus and the Oceanid Asterope in Greek mythology
- Acragas (silversmith), an engraver or chaser in silver, mentioned by Pliny the Elder
- S.S. Akragas Città dei Templi, commonly referred to as S.S. Akragas, an Italian association football club based in Agrigento, Sicily
