= Nathaniel Richardson =

American silversmith

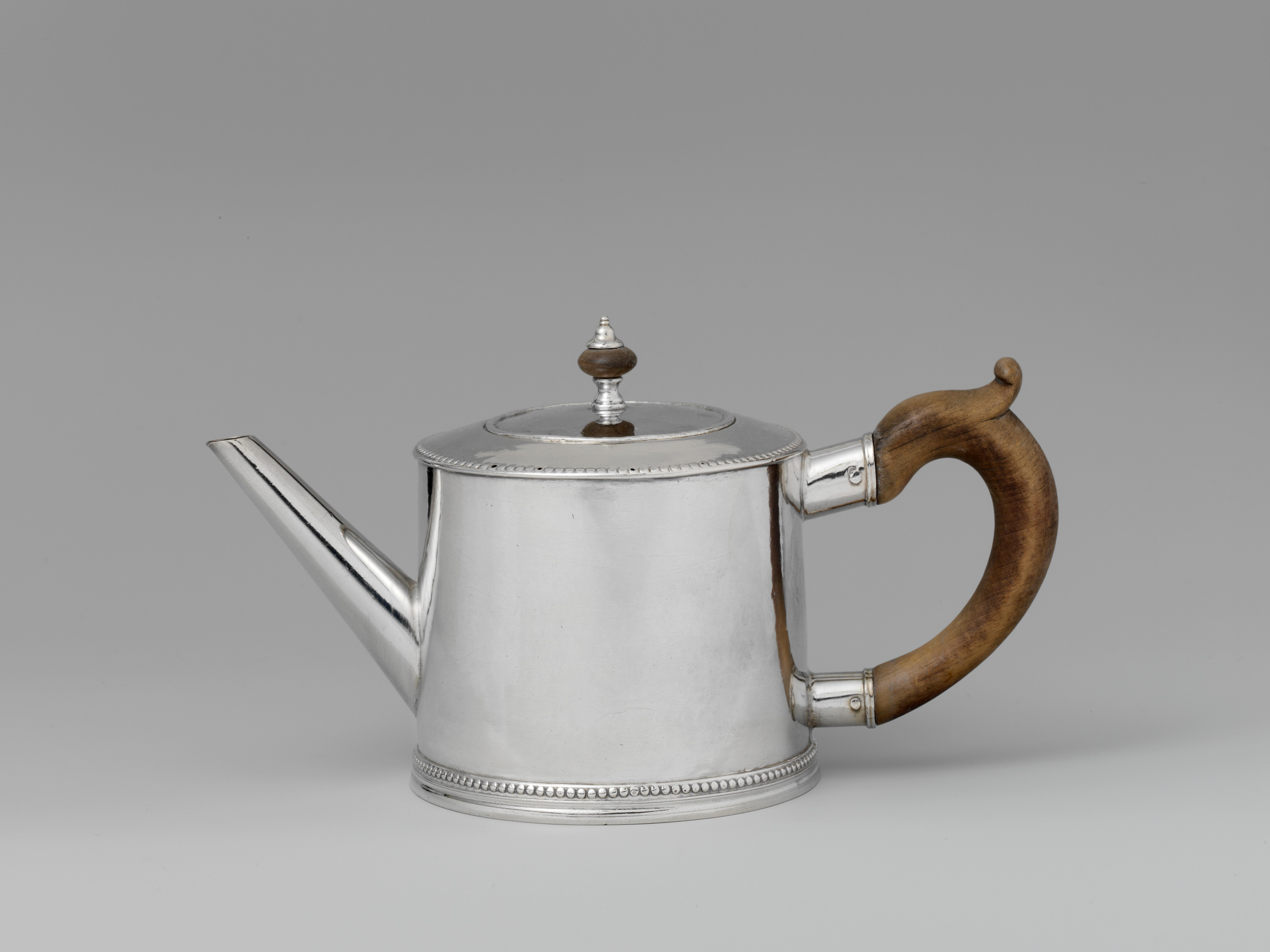
Teapot by Joseph Richardson Jr. and Nathaniel Richardson, 1777–1790

Nathaniel Richardson (February/April 2, 1754 – September 2, 1827) was an American silversmith, active in Philadelphia.

Richardson was born to noted silversmith Joseph Richardson Sr. and raised in the craft. From 1785 to 1791, he partnered with his older brother, Joseph Richardson Jr., in the silversmithing firm of Joseph & Nathaniel Richardson, but then gave up silversmithing and became an ironmonger and hardware merchant with Isaac Paxton. His silver, created in partnership with his brother, is collected in the Addison Gallery of American Art, Museum of Fine Arts, Boston, Art Institute of Chicago, Clark Art Institute, Philadelphia Museum of Art, Winterthur Museum, and Yale University Art Gallery.
