= Hardy tool =

Tools used with an anvil

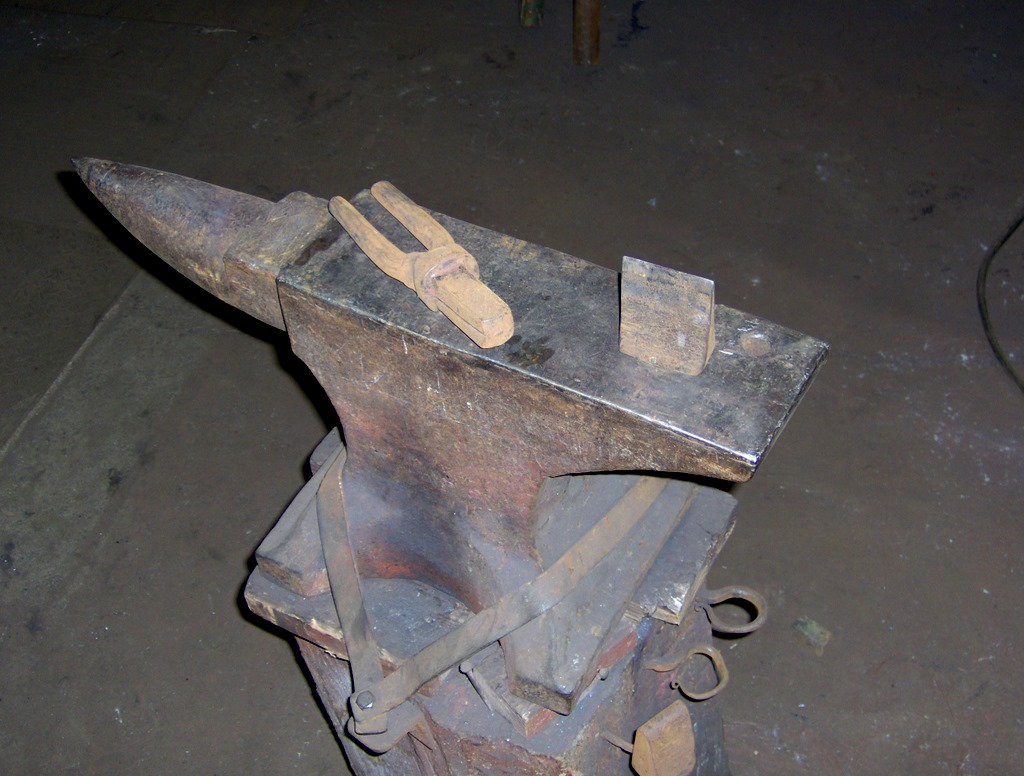
A hardy in the hardy hole of an anvil. A bending fork lies next to it with its square shank clearly visible.

Hardy tools, also known as anvil tools or bottom tools, are metalworking tools used in anvils.

== Description ==
A hardy has a square shank, which prevents it from rotating when placed in the anvil's hardy hole. The term "hardy", used alone, refers to a cutting chisel used in the square hole of the anvil. Other bottom tools are identified by function. Typical hardy tools include chisels and bending drifts. They are generally used with a matching top tool.

Different hardy tools are used to form and cut metal. The swage is used to make metal a specific cross section, usually round for final use as nails, bolts, rods or rivets. The fuller is used to stretch or help bend metal, and make dents and shoulders. Many hardy shapes have corresponding hammer like tools with head shapes to help form metal, called top tools, for example a V-shaped swage is used with an inverted V-shaped hammer like top tool to form iron into an angle shape.

== Gallery ==
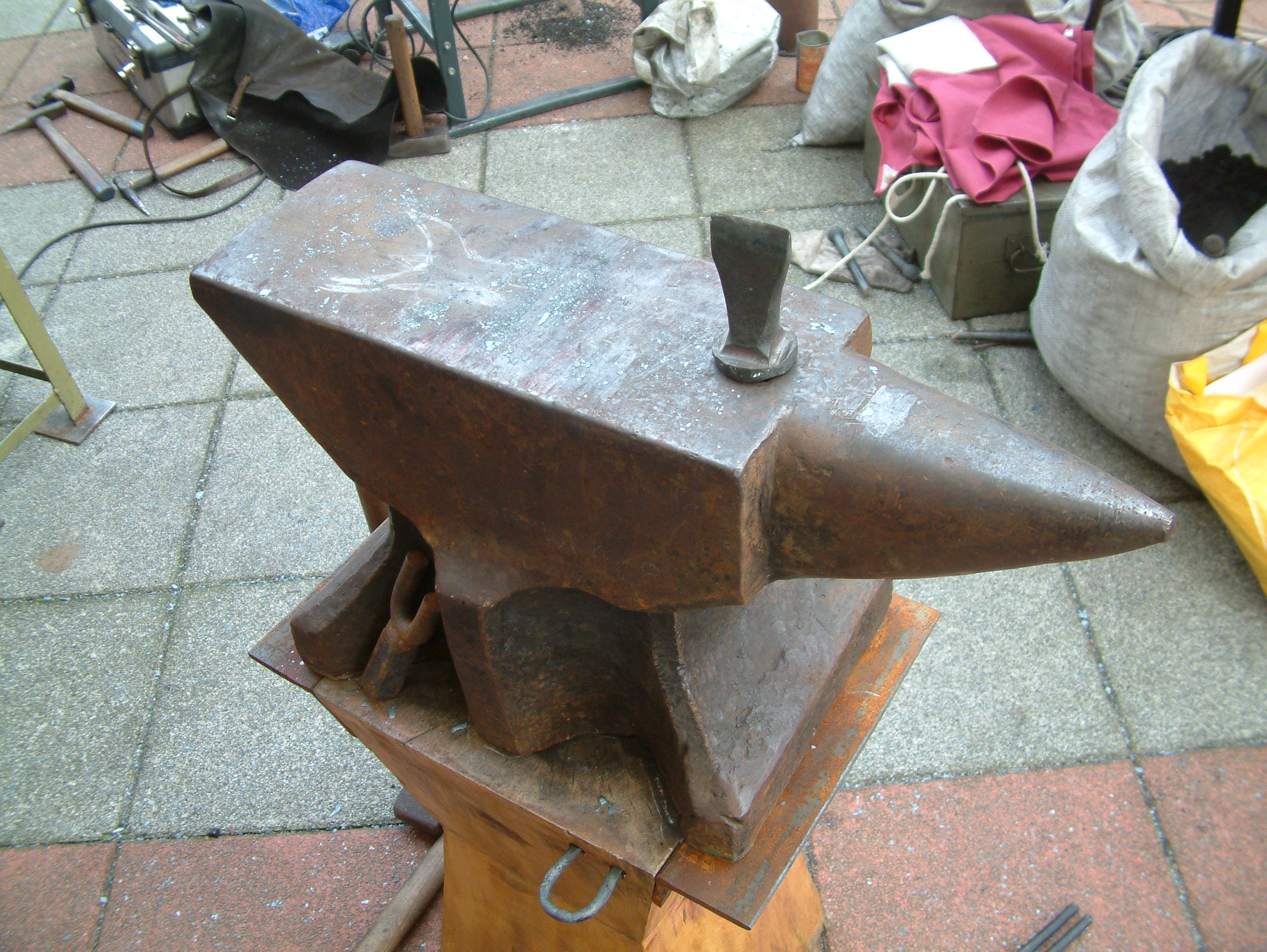
Hardy tool used to cut hot metal in its hardy hole on the anvil

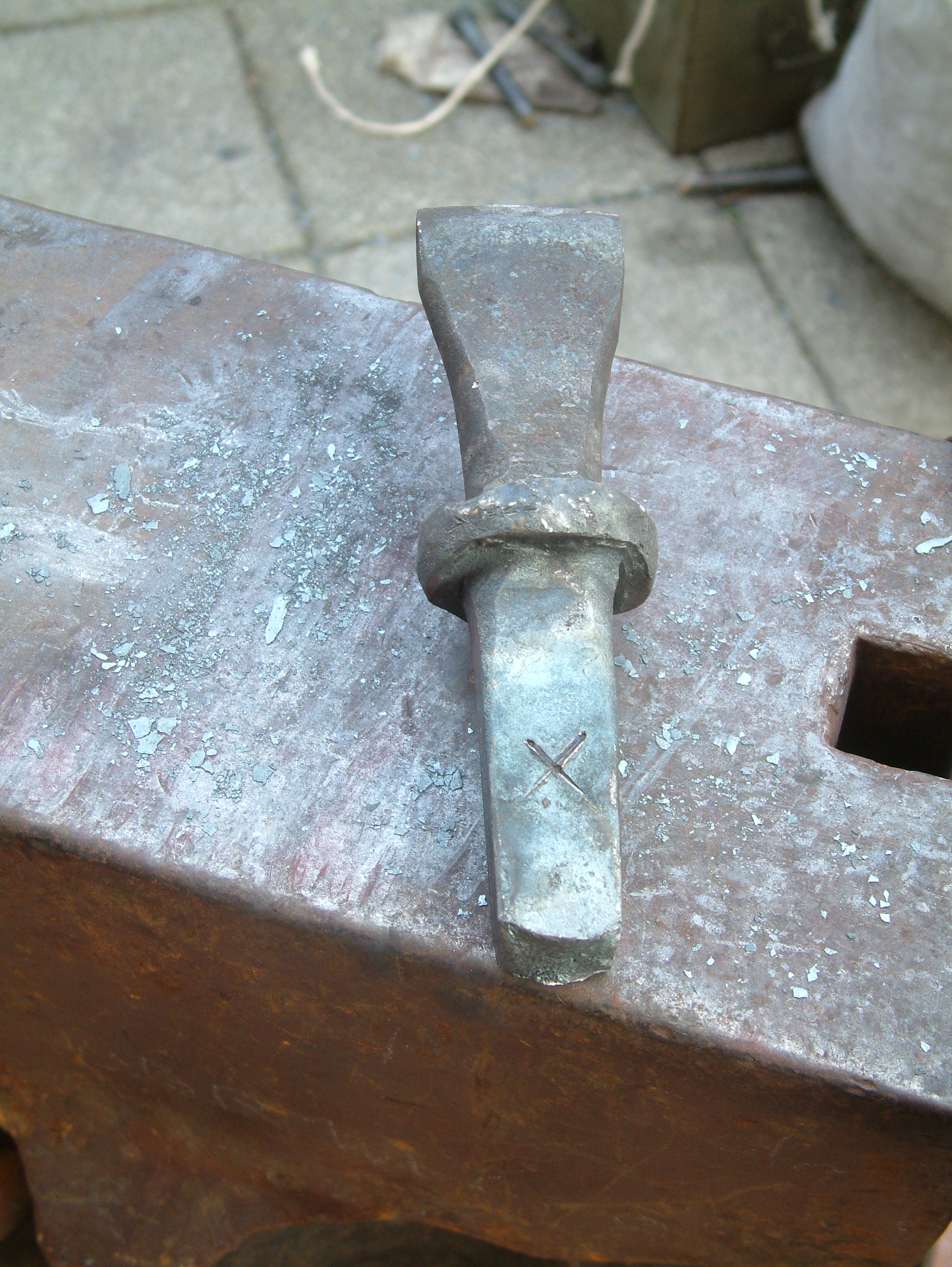
Hardy tool used to cut hot metal alongside the hardy hole

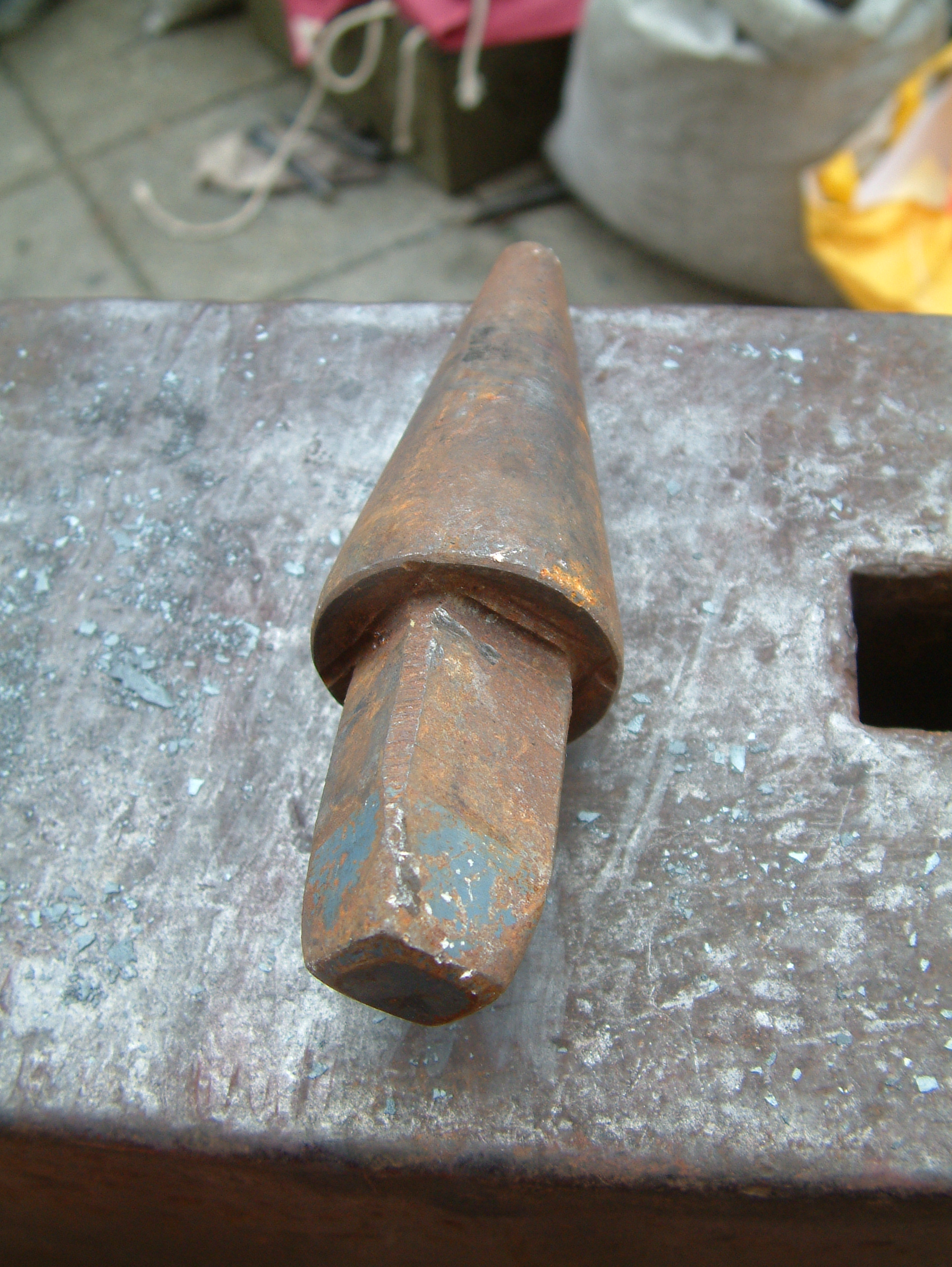
Hardy tool used to pierce hot metal beside the hardy hole

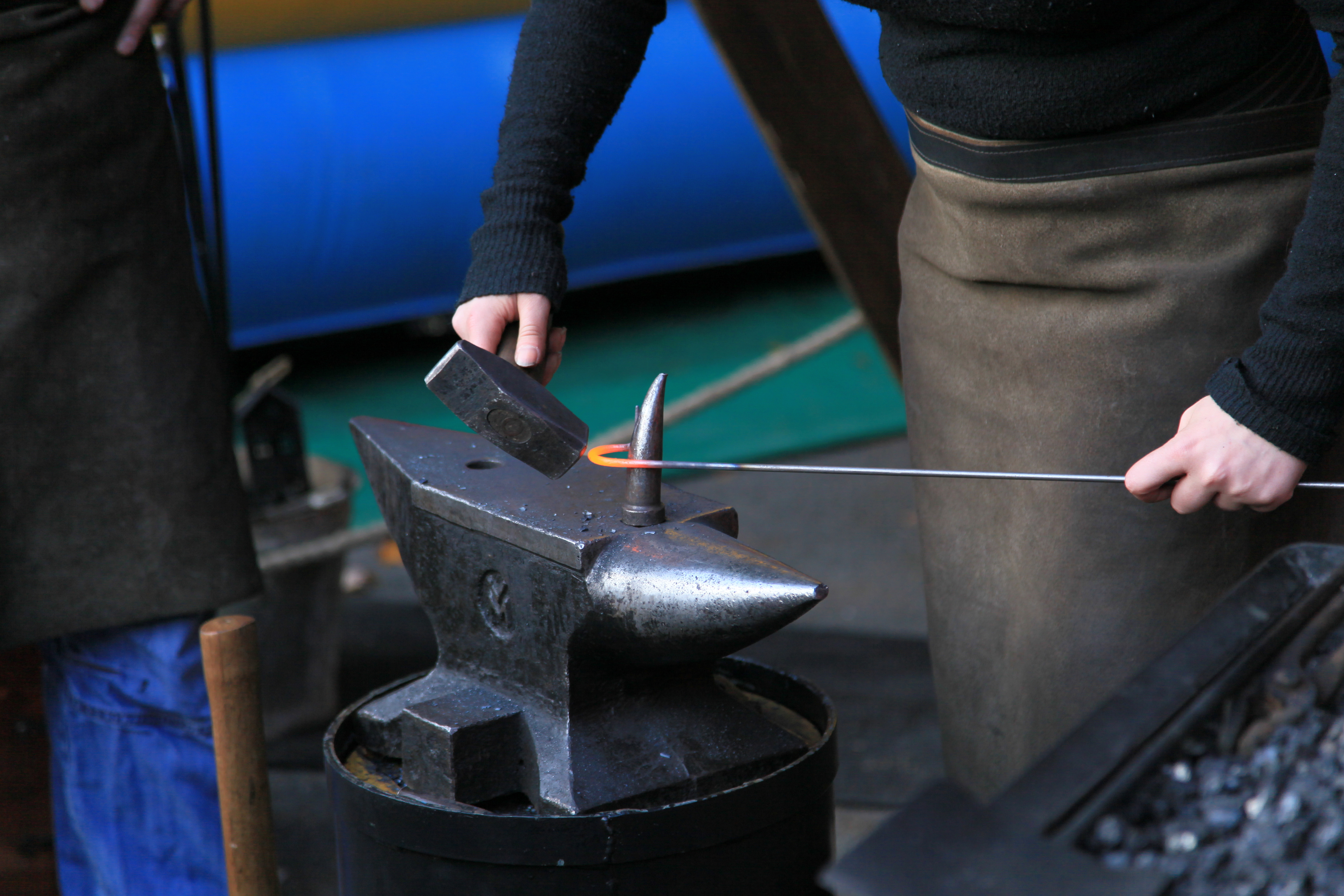
Hardy tool bending drift being used to bend a rod
