= Set tool =

A Set tool is a blacksmithing tool meant to be struck by a hammer, either a sledge or power. Set tools are usually made with a handle to keep the smith a safe distance from the action. Set tools for the anvil, where they are struck with a sledgehammer, often have a wooden handle set into the head in the same way as a hammer. Set tools are sometimes handled by wrapping a thick wire handle around a groove in the body of the tool. Set tools to be used under a power hammer are much shorter than traditional and the handle is usually arc welded on or forged integrally with the tool.
