= Adda Husted Andersen =

Danish-born American jeweler, silversmith, metalsmith, and educator

Adda Husted-Andersen
- Born: Adda Thyra Elise Louise Husted-Andersen; August 5, 1898; Trustrup, Lyngby, Denmark
- Died: September 13, 1990 (aged 92); Copenhagen, Denmark
- Other names: Andy Husted-Andersen, Adda Husted Andersen
- Education: Copenhagen Technical College, Badisch Kunstgewerbeschule
- Known for: jewelry, metalsmith, educator, enameler

Adda "Andy" Thyra Elise Louise Husted-Andersen (August 5, 1898 – September 13, 1990) was a Danish-born American Modernist jeweler, silversmith, metalsmith, and educator. She was a co-founder and the president of the New York Society of Craftsmen (later called Artist-Craftsmen of New York) from 1941 to 1944. She was a master of working with enamel, silver and gold. She was active in New York City and Copenhagen.

== Biography ==
Adda Husted-Andersen was born on August 5, 1898, in Trustrup, Lyngby, Denmark. Husted-Andersen studied at Copenhagen Technical College, under Thyra Vieth (1866–1938) and later at Badisch Kunstgewerbeschule (Baden Applied Arts and Crafts School) in Pforzheim, Germany. In Copenhagen she worked with A. Dragsted. She studied enameling with Jean Dunand.

Husted-Andersen arrived in New York City in 1930, and worked with Georg Jensen enameling homewares.

She naturalized in the United States in 1941. She had a jewelry studio on First Street in New York City for many years, which she opened in 1944. She was a member of the editorial board of Craft Horizons magazine, reviewing the metal crafts.

She taught courses at the Craft Students League (CSL) of New York City. Husted-Andersen's students included Glenda Arentzen, Walter Rhodes (1896–1968), Ann Orr Morris, Pearl Schecter (1903–1976), Frances Higgins (née Stewart, 1912–2004), Henry Petzal, and others.

In 1975, she became a fellow of the American Craft Council (ACC).

In the 1970s, she retired from work and moved back to Copenhagen. She died on September 13, 1990, in Copenhagen, Denmark. Her work is included in the public museum collections at The Newark Museum of Art, the Baltimore Museum of Art, Archives of American Art, among others.
