= Henry Petzal =

- Born: August 16, 1906; Berlin, Germany
- Died: March 15, 2020 (aged 113)
- Known for: silversmithing

Henry Petzal (August 16, 1906 – March 15, 2002) was an American silversmith. He did not begin silversmithing until 1957 at the age of 50.

== History ==
Henry Petzal was born on August 16, 1906, in Berlin. He came to the United States as a German refugee in 1935, settling in Shrewsbury, New Jersey. For many years he worked in the textile industry.

In 1963, he started taking classes at New York City YMCA on Fiftieth Street, where he studied with Rudolph Schumacher, William Seitz. And he took classes the Craft Students League, he learned from Adda Husted Andersen. His greatest inspiration in his designs was Chinese ceramics. He designed and hand-raised every piece.

His works are held in the permanent collections of the Museum of Fine Arts, Boston, the Chicago Museum of Fine Arts, the Silversmith's Museum in London, England. The largest collection is at the Mingei Museum in San Diego, and the Mingei International Museum.
