= Shepherd and Boyd =

American silversmith partnership

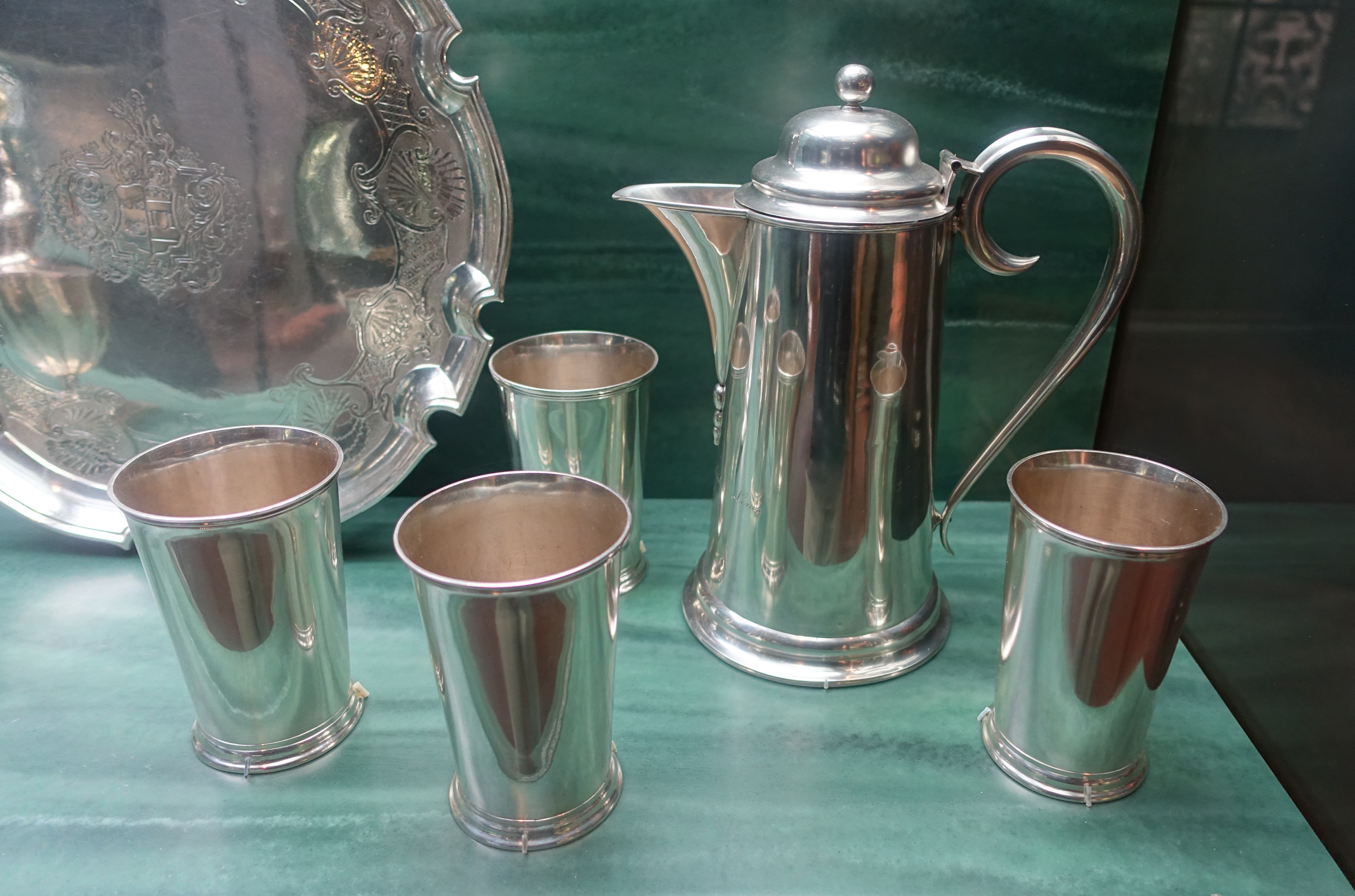
Communion service by Shepherd and Boyd, c. 1816

Shepherd and Boyd was an American silversmith partnership between Robert Shepherd (1781 – March 6, 1853) and William Boyd (September 14, 1774 – April 24, 1840), active at 136 Market Street, Albany, New York, from 1806 to 1830. Their work is collected in the Albany Institute of History & Art, Clark Art Institute, Metropolitan Museum of Art, Museum of Fine Arts, Boston, and Yale University Art Gallery.
