= Joseph Richardson Jr. =

American silversmith (1752–1831)

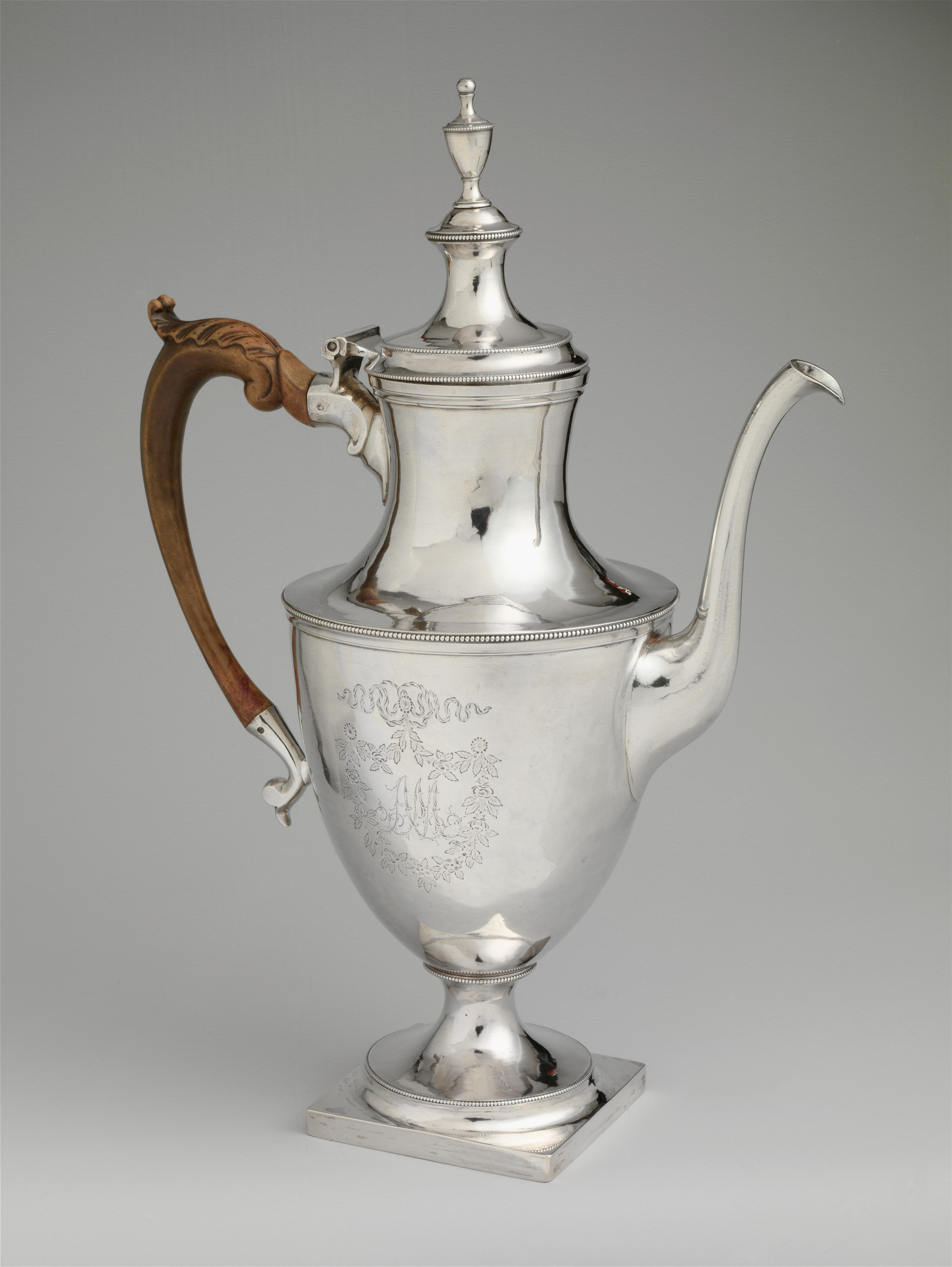
Coffeepot by Joseph Richardson, Jr., circa 1795

Joseph Richardson, Jr. (December 4, 1752 – March 11, 1831), was an American silversmith, active in Philadelphia.

Richardson was born in Philadelphia, the son of silversmith Joseph Richardson Sr. (1711–1784) and grandson of noted silversmith, Francis Richardson II (November 25, 1684, New York City – August 17, 1729, Philadelphia). He apprenticed about 1765 to his father, then joined his shop on Front Street, between Chestnut and Walnut Streets. On June 15, 1780, he married Ruth Hoskins at Burlington, New Jersey. In 1784 he took over his father's business, then from 1785 to 1791 partnered with his brother, Nathaniel Richardson, as I. & N. RICHARDSON. On December 12, 1795, George Washington appointed him Assayer of the Philadelphia Mint, which position he held until his death. From 1795 to 1802 he partnered with James Howell in Philadelphia, Pennsylvania, as RICHARDSON & Co., from 1802 to 1810 worked solo, and ultimately sold his business to Howell.

Richardson is best known for his Washington Indian Peace Medals, as he created some of the 1793 and all of the 1795 medals. This followed naturally from his earlier assistance to his father in the Friendly Association for Regaining and Preserving Peace with the Indians by Pacific Measures (founded 1755). Another notable commission was the teapot and waste bowl for which George Washington paid $44.55 in 1796.

His works are collected in the Art Institute of Chicago, Metropolitan Museum of Art, Museum of Fine Arts, Boston, and Winterthur Museum.
