= Glenda Arentzen =

American goldsmith, jeweler (born 1941)

- Born: 1941 (age 84–85); Ridgewood, New Jersey, U.S.
- Education: Skidmore College, Teachers College, Columbia University
- Partner: Rick Harkness

Glenda Arentzen (born 1941) is an American jeweler, goldsmith, and educator. In 2008, Arentzen was elected a Fellow of the American Craft Council (ACC).

== Biography ==
Glenda Arentzen was born in 1941 in Ridgewood, New Jersey. She attended Skidmore College (BS degree, 1962) and Teachers College, Columbia University (MA degree, 1964). Arentzen also studied in Denmark as a Fulbright scholar in metalworking. Early in her career, she worked as a studio assistant for Adda Husted-Andersen, who also served as a mentor and introduced her to working with gemstones. In the 1960s, she learned about a layering metals technique from Robert Ebendorf.

Arentzen taught at Fashion Institute of Technology (FIT) for many years. Jeweler Anne Behrsing served an as apprentice under Arentzen.

Arentzen's work is included in public museum collections, including the Museum of Fine Arts, Houston, Museum of Fine Arts, Boston, and others.
