= Joseph Richardson Sr. =

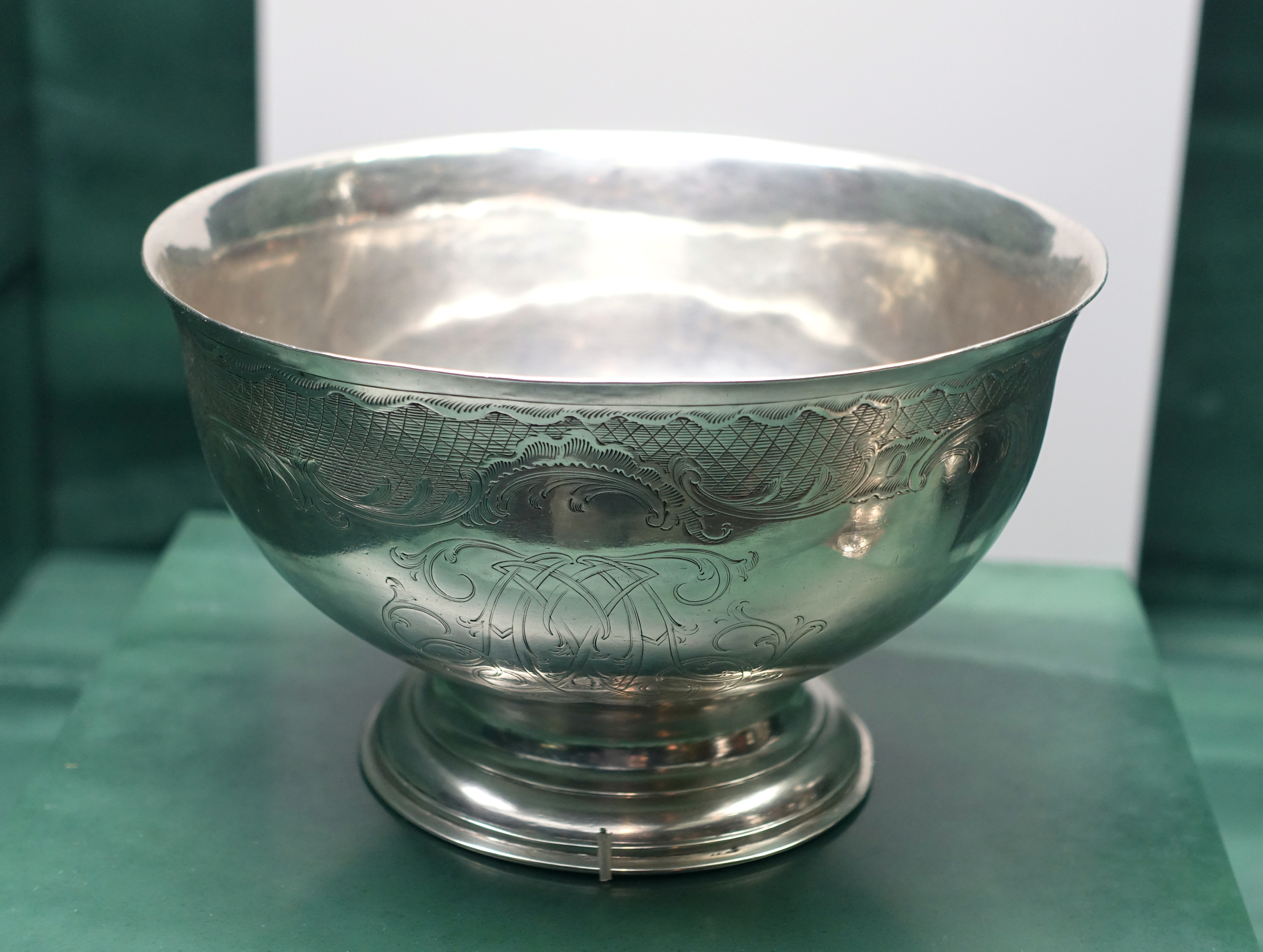
Bowl by Joseph Richardson Sr., c. 1760

Joseph Richardson Sr. (September 28, 1711 - 1784) was an American silversmith, active in Philadelphia. He has been described as one of the greatest silversmiths of his time.

Richardson was born in Philadelphia to silversmith Francis Richardson II (November 25, 1684 - August 17, 1729), and advertised in the Pennsylvania Gazette from 1744-1784 as goldsmith. He was a Quaker and an active member of the "Friendly Association for Regaining and Preserving Peace with the Indians by Pacific Measures." As such, he crafted many silver items for Native Americans in addition to bowls, tea sets, and other tableware. He was twice married: first to Hannah Worrell on August 13, 1741, and then to Mary Allen on April 14, 1748, with whom he had two sons (Joseph Richardson Jr. and Nathaniel Richardson), both of whom he raised as silversmiths.

His work is collected in the Art Institute of Chicago, Metropolitan Museum of Art, Philadelphia Museum of Art, Winterthur Museum, and Yale University Art Gallery.
