= Ann Orr Morris =

American metal artist and silversmith (1924-1987)

- Born: August 5, 1924; Athens, Georgia, US
- Died: August 15, 1987 (aged 63)
- Occupations: Silversmith, goldsmith, and enamelist

Ann Orr Morris (August 5, 1924 – August 15, 1987) was an American silversmith, goldsmith, and enamelist. She died in her hometown of Athens, Georgia, the victim of a triple homicide.

== Life and work ==
After graduating from the University of Georgia (UGA), Morris studied the art of metalwork in New York and in Europe. Margaret de Patta, Philip Morton, and Adda Husted Andersen all influenced Orr Morris's style. She served a four-year apprenticeship under Husted-Andersen and the two spent an additional brief time working together at the David-Andersen Factory in Oslo, Norway.

Though best known for her metal jewelry creations, Orr Morris was also a skilled watercolorist. Describing Orr Morris's work, University of Georgia professor and metalworker Rob Jackson said, "One was, at first, struck, by the apparent simplicity of the objects. Deeply rooted in the 1950's search for form, there is almost a sense of innocence in the work."

In 1957, Orr Morris attended a writer's workshop at the University of Georgia led by writer Flannery O'Connor. Her recollections of O'Connor were featured in a 1991 article in Athens Magazine.

Nashville-born crafter of gold and silver jewelry and maker of sterling silver holloware, Conn Harris West, studied with Orr Morris. Silversmith Charles Rowland was also her student.

== Death and legacy ==
On August 15, 1987, at age 63, Orr Morris was attacked with a hatchet by Clinton Bankston Jr., a 16-year-old Athens resident who had killed two other retired University of Georgia (UGA) professors during a burglary four months earlier, in April 1987. The murder happened in the home of Ann's sister, Sally Nathanson, in the Carr's Hill neighborhood. Her sister Nathanson, and her 22-year-old adopted daughter, Helen, were also murdered. The women were found after Morris's husband reported her missing.

From September 24 to November 13, 1994, the Georgia Museum of Art held a posthumous exhibit honoring Orr Morris. The museum produced a 69-page catalog, entitled Ann Orr: Silversmith, Goldsmith, & Enamelist, to accompany the exhibition. Orr Morris's close friend, watercolorist Martha Odum (wife of ecologist Eugene Odum) traveled the Southeast to collect jewelry for inclusion in the exhibit. Odum also oversaw the photography of the pieces for the exhibition catalog. Former UGA professor and metalsmith, Gary Noffke served as one of the editors of this catalog.

The Ann Orr Morris Memorial Fund provides funds to bring visiting artists to UGA's Lamar Dodd School of Art to deliver lectures and workshops on jewelry-making and metalwork.
