= Pritchel =

Type of hole punch used in forging

A pritchel is a type of punch used in forging, particularly in making nail holes in horseshoes. The horseshoe is heated and a hole is punched through 90 percent of the steel with a forepunch or drift punch. The pointed end of the tool should be kept sharp so that the burr is cut out smoothly. The punched hole is lined up over the pritchel hole and the pritchel is driven into the hole, knocking out the remaining metal at the bottom of the punched hole. The temperature of the pritchel should be kept below the red-hot stage as the tool itself will bend and lose its temper. When over-heated it is advised to cool it in water immediately.

== Back pritcheling ==
The pritchel should normally be driven from the bottom of the shoe, similarly as the nail is driven. Back pritcheling is the process of driving it from the opposite side — the hoof side — leaving burrs and resulting in weakening and cutting the nails.

== Pritchel hole ==
A pritchel hole is a round hole in an anvil. Its primary purpose is to provide clearance for punching tools, but it can also be used to hold tools that have round shanks. Pritchel tools are tools such as punches whose functions do not require them to be held at a particular orientation. A square hole in an anvil is called a Hardy hole, not to be confused with tapered square holes seen in tinsmith's equipment.
