= Silversmith =

Craftsperson who makes objects from silver or gold

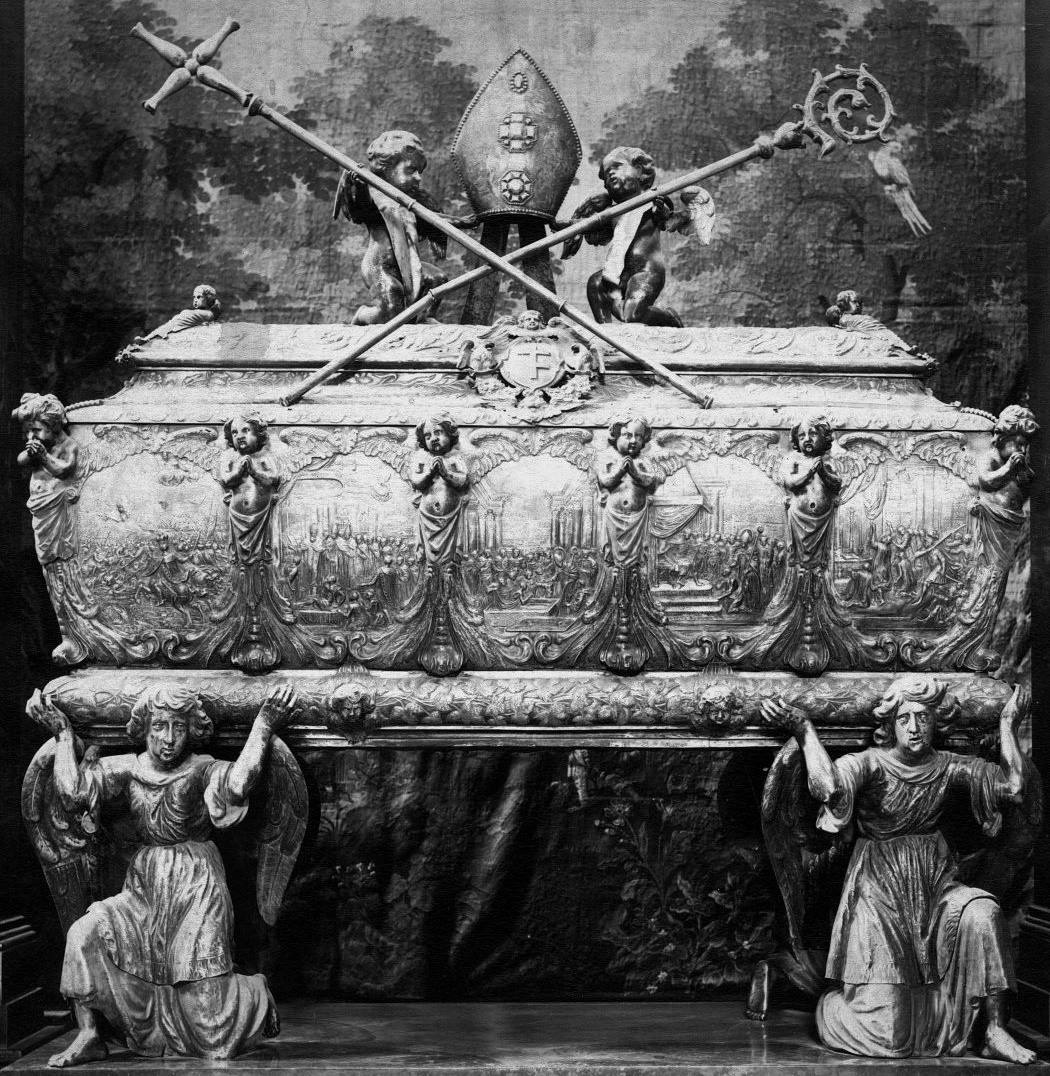
Embossed silver sarcophagus of Saint Stanislaus in the Wawel Cathedral, created in the main centers of 17th-century European silversmithery – Augsburg and Gdańsk

A silversmith is a metalworker who crafts objects from silver. The terms silversmith and goldsmith are not exact synonyms, but the techniques, training, history, and guilds are (or were, at least) largely the same. Being both much heavier and far more expensive, gold objects are typically a good deal smaller.

== History ==
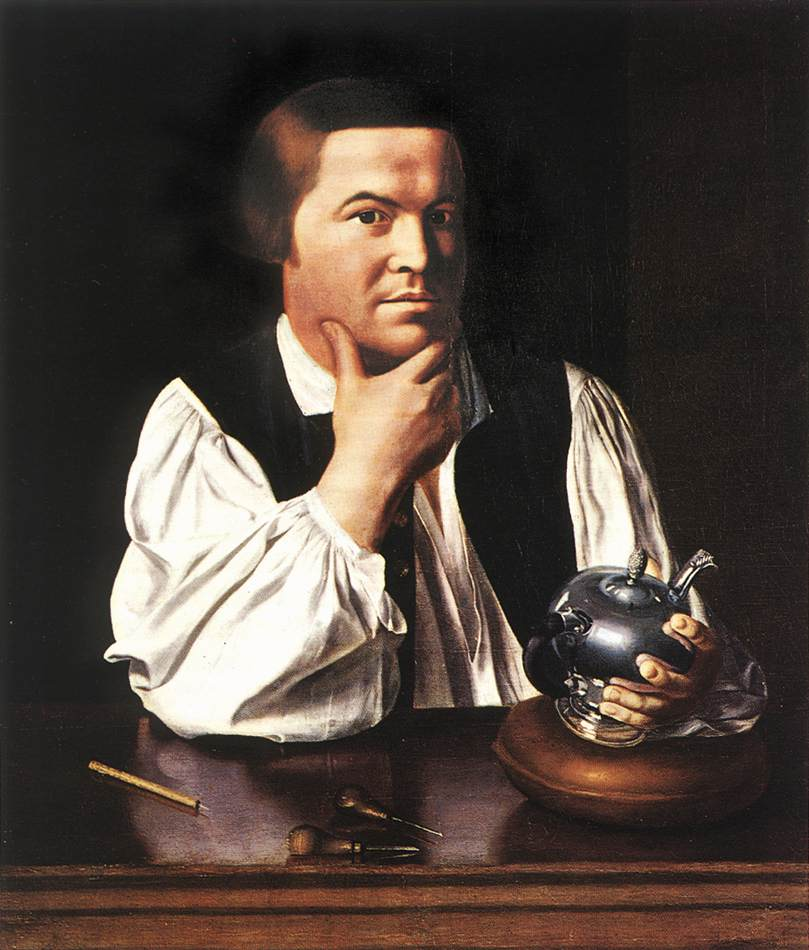
Paul Revere with a silver teapot and some of his engraving tools

In the ancient Near East (as holds true today), the value of silver was lower than the value of gold, allowing a silversmith to produce objects and store them as stock. Historian Jack Ogden states that, according to an edict written by Diocletian in 301 A.D., a silversmith was able to charge 75, 100, 150, 200, 250, or 300 denarii per Roman pound for material produced. At that time, guilds of silversmiths formed to arbitrate disputes, protect its members' welfare, and educate the public of the trade.

From classical antiquity until about the 18th century, while pottery was universally available, it was low status, and the rich used silver domestic plate for eating off, serving food, and a variety of functions such as candlesticks. At the same time, the lack of banks and attractive and stable places to invest spare cash meant that rich families were ready to keep a good deal of their wealth in the form of "plate" in the house. The arrival of porcelain, both imported from the Far East, and later locally produced, finally broke silver's hold on tableware for the rich.

== Tools, materials and techniques ==
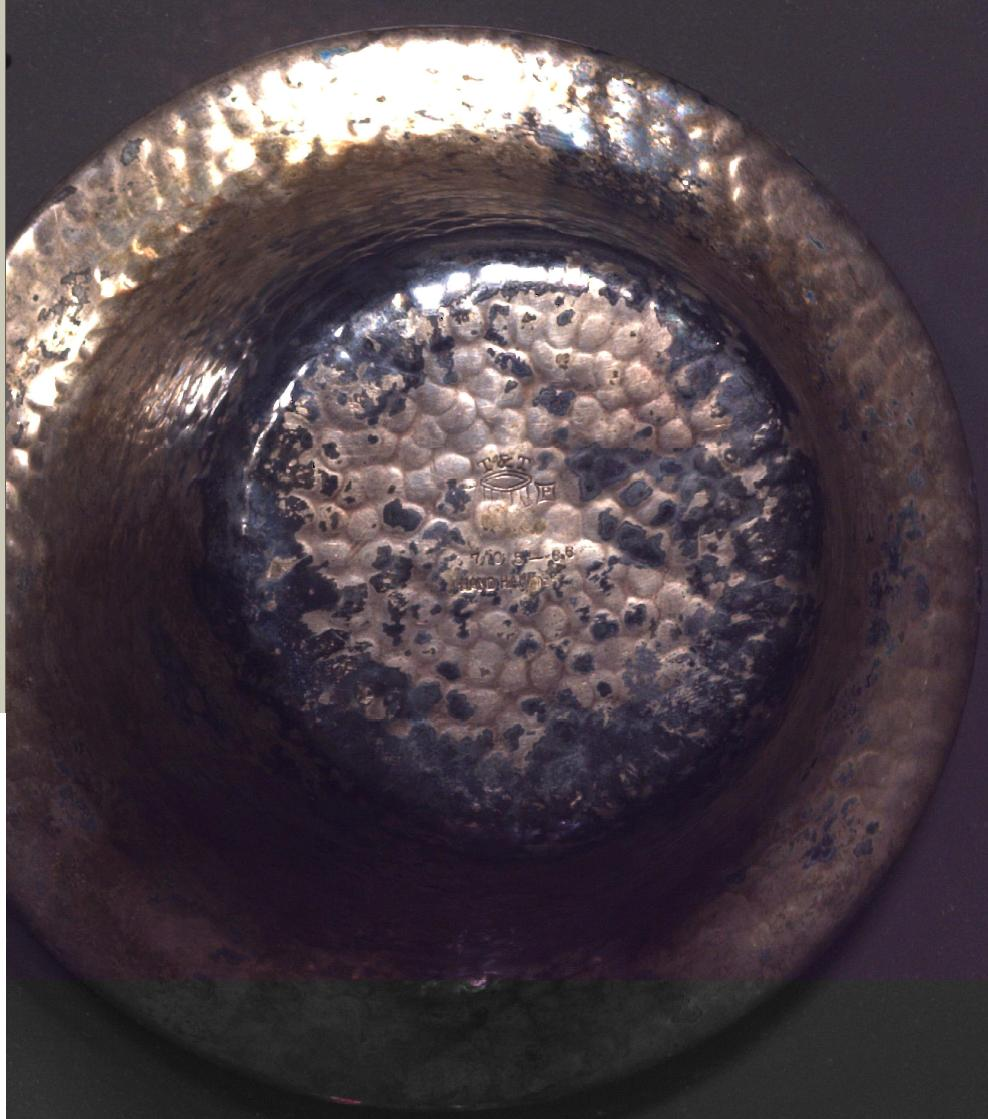
Dish made by hand-hammering

- saw (jeweler's saw)
- snips
- flat file
- jewelers' files
- planishing hammer
- raising hammer
- cross-pein hammer
- ball-pein hammer
- anvils
- stakes
- swage blocks
- riveting
- silver hard-solder
- flux
  - borax
  - boric acid
- torch or blow-pipe
- pickle (dilute sulphuric acid or organic acids which are used to remove firescale)
- buffing wheels
- polishing compounds.
- chasing
- repoussé
- engraving

Silversmiths saw or cut specific shapes from sterling and fine silver sheet metal and bar stock; they then use hammers to form the metal over anvils and stakes. Silver is hammered cold (at room temperature). As the metal is hammered, bent, and worked, it 'work-hardens'. Annealing is the heat-treatment used to make the metal soft again. If metal is work-hardened, and not annealed occasionally, the metal will crack and weaken the work.

Silversmiths can use casting techniques to create knobs, handles and feet for the hollowware they are making.

After forming and casting, the various pieces may be assembled by soldering and riveting.

During most of their history, silversmiths used charcoal or coke fired forges, and lung-powered blow-pipes for soldering and annealing. Modern silversmiths commonly use gas burning torches as heat sources. A newer method is laser beam welding.

Silversmiths may also work with copper and brass, especially when making practice pieces, due to those materials having similar working properties and being more affordable than silver.

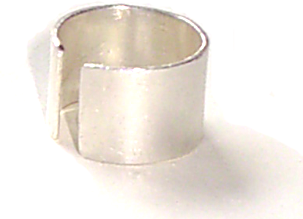
Band made of silver

== Notable and historical silversmiths ==
Companies

- Garrard & Co
- Hersey & Son (Note: Garrad & Co. was founded by George Wickes in London in 1722 and is still operating.)
- Phipps & Robinson
- Reid & Sons (Note: Reid & Sons was founded in 1788 in Newcastle and is still operating.)

People

- Acragas
- Kurt Aepli
- Zahroun Amara, Mandaean niello silversmith
- Hester Bateman
- Peter Bentzon, the only early American silversmith of African ancestry whose silver has been identified
- Bernard Bernstein, American silversmith
- Jocelyn Burton
- Benvenuto Cellini
- José Velázquez de Medrano, the most significant silversmith of his time during the Spanish Golden Age
- Stephen Emery, early American silversmith
- Thomas Germain
- François-Thomas Germain
- Karl Gustav Hansen, Danish pioneer of Scandinavian silversmith design
- John Hull, Treasurer of the Massachusetts Bay Colony
- Isaac Hutton
- Georg Jensen
- Sampson Mordan
- Jean-Valentin Morel, French jeweler and craftsman
- Henry Petzal
- Paul Revere, American silversmith, manufacturer, and patriot
- Joseph Richardson Sr. and Joseph Richardson Jr., American silversmiths based in Philadelphia
- Atsidi Sani (Old Smith in English), the first known Navajo silversmith
- Alfredo Sciarrotta
- Sequoyah, Cherokee silversmith, inventor of the Cherokee syllabary
- Alice Sheene
- Robert Shepherd and William Boyd
- Robert Welch
- Edward Winlsow, early American silversmith

== See also ==
- Yemenite silversmithing
- Mouza Sulaiman Mohamed Al-Wardi
- Mapuche silverwork
- Potosí Silversmithing School
- Goldsmith
