= Swage block =

Metalworking tool

A swage block (or swager block) is a large, heavy block of cast iron or steel used in smithing, with variously sized holes in its face and usually with forms on the sides.

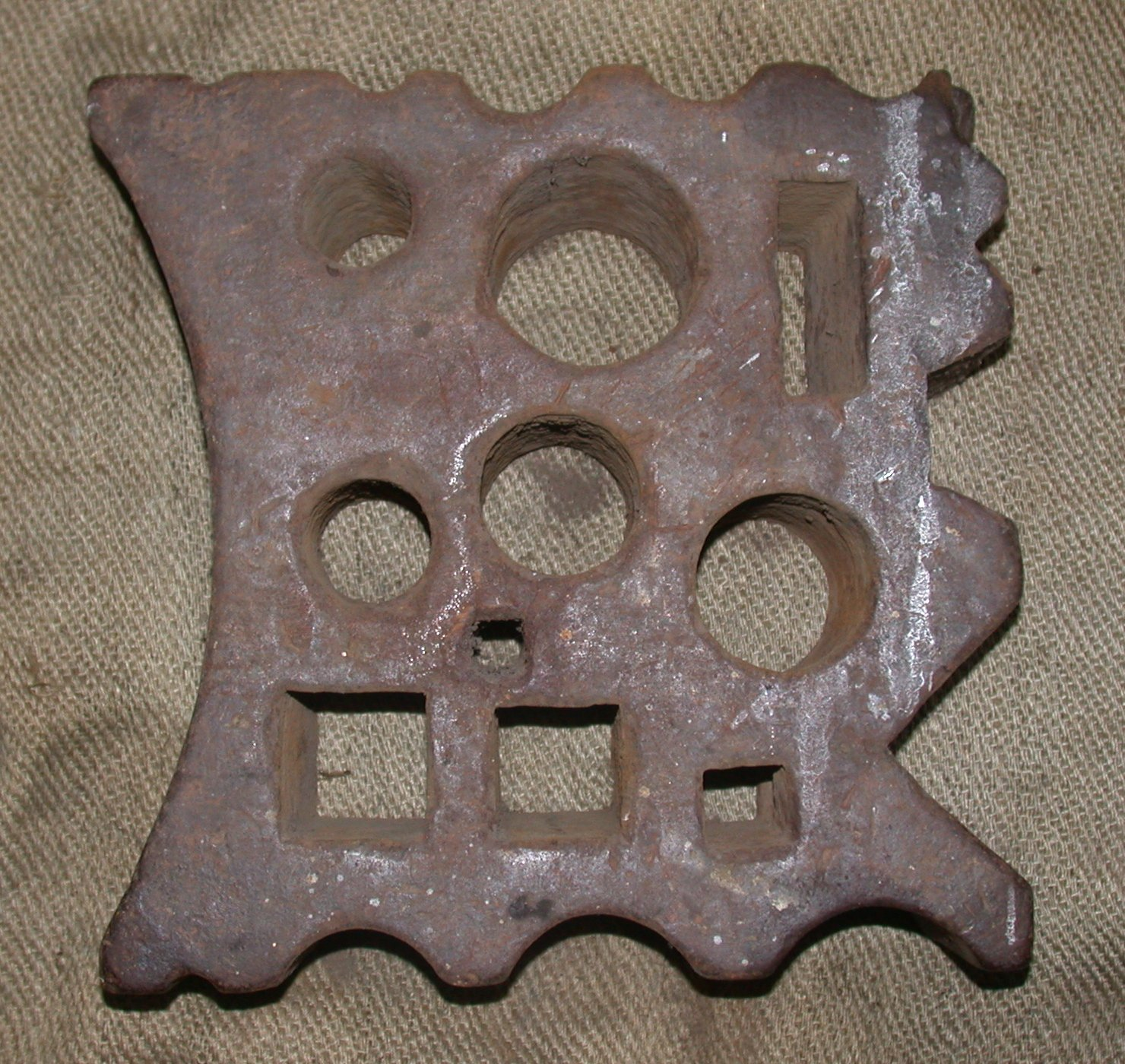
Top view of a swage block showing various sized holes and sections

The through-holes are of various shapes and sizes and are used to hold, support or back up a hot bar of metal for further shaping. Operations performed on a swage block include but are not limited to bending, cutting, punching and forming. The sides are scalloped to present formed shapes for forging operations. Shapes are for example the curve of a wheel, which could be used to finish a wheel rim, using a suitable hammer. Other shapes, such as the half hexagon, can be used with a matching top swage to form a hexagonal cross-section on a bar. The various shapes around the edge of the swage block all have corresponding shapes in the form of top swages to shape iron bar into various sections.

The image shows a 15-inch, square swage block with various semi-circular, hexagonal, and square shapes around its perimeter along with a selection of through-holes.

There are two general types of swage block: Industrial, as described above, and artistic. Artist Blacksmiths sometimes require a tool that will allow metal to be formed in ways that an anvil or traditional industrial swage block will not allow, a special Artists' block is then often used. As with industrial swage blocks, artistic blocks come in many shapes and sizes; common features are hemispherical and ovoid depressions, asymmetrical curves and non-standard angled planes (i.e. not 45 or 90 degrees). In addition, individual blocks may contain unique features of specific use or relevance to a particular smith or branch of the blacksmithing craft.

The example pictured below is a block ten inches square by four inches deep and allows a smith to form metal to various angles and shapes, most notably as spoons, ladles and funnels.

== Gallery ==
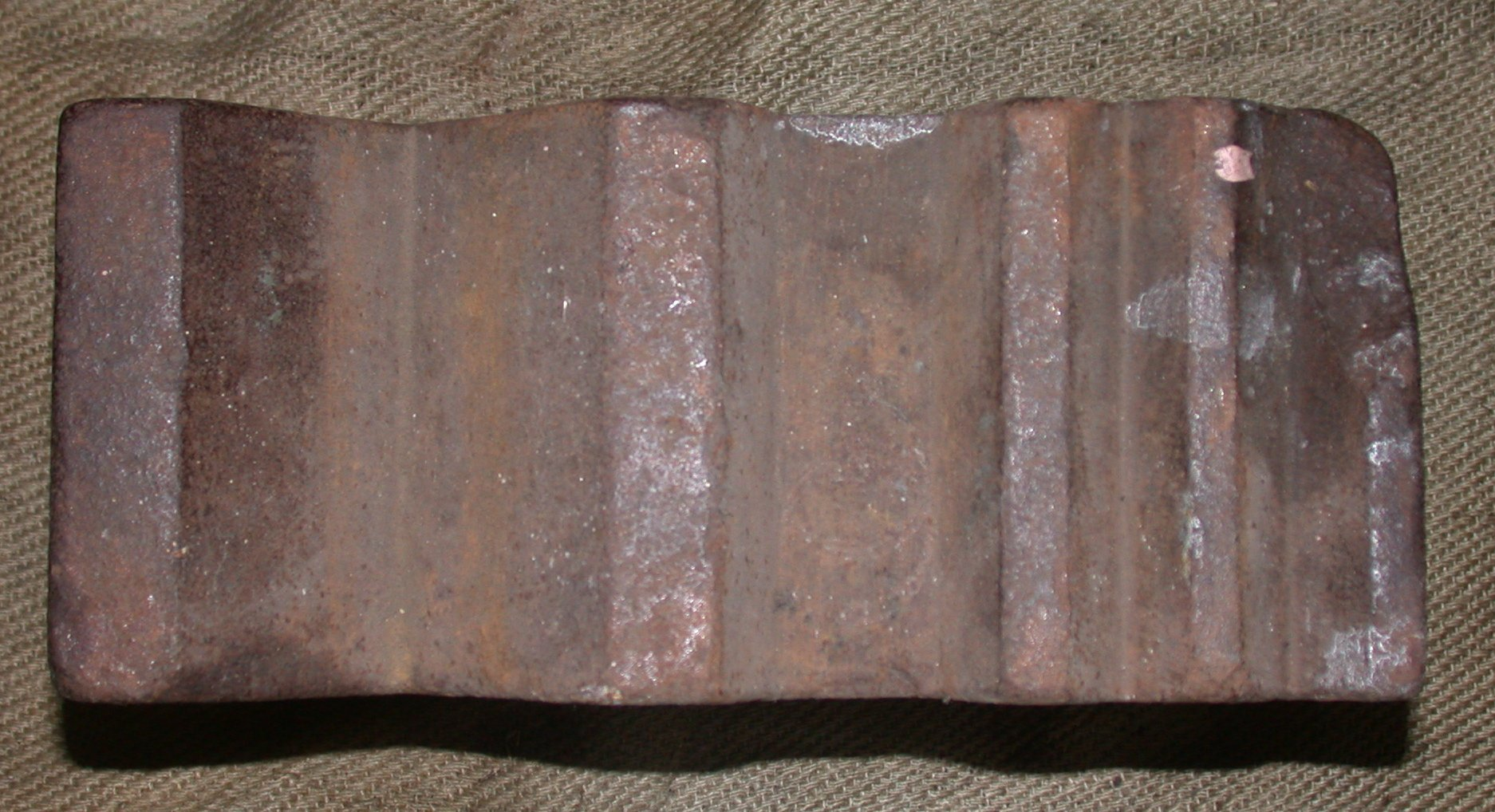
Right side view of the above swage block

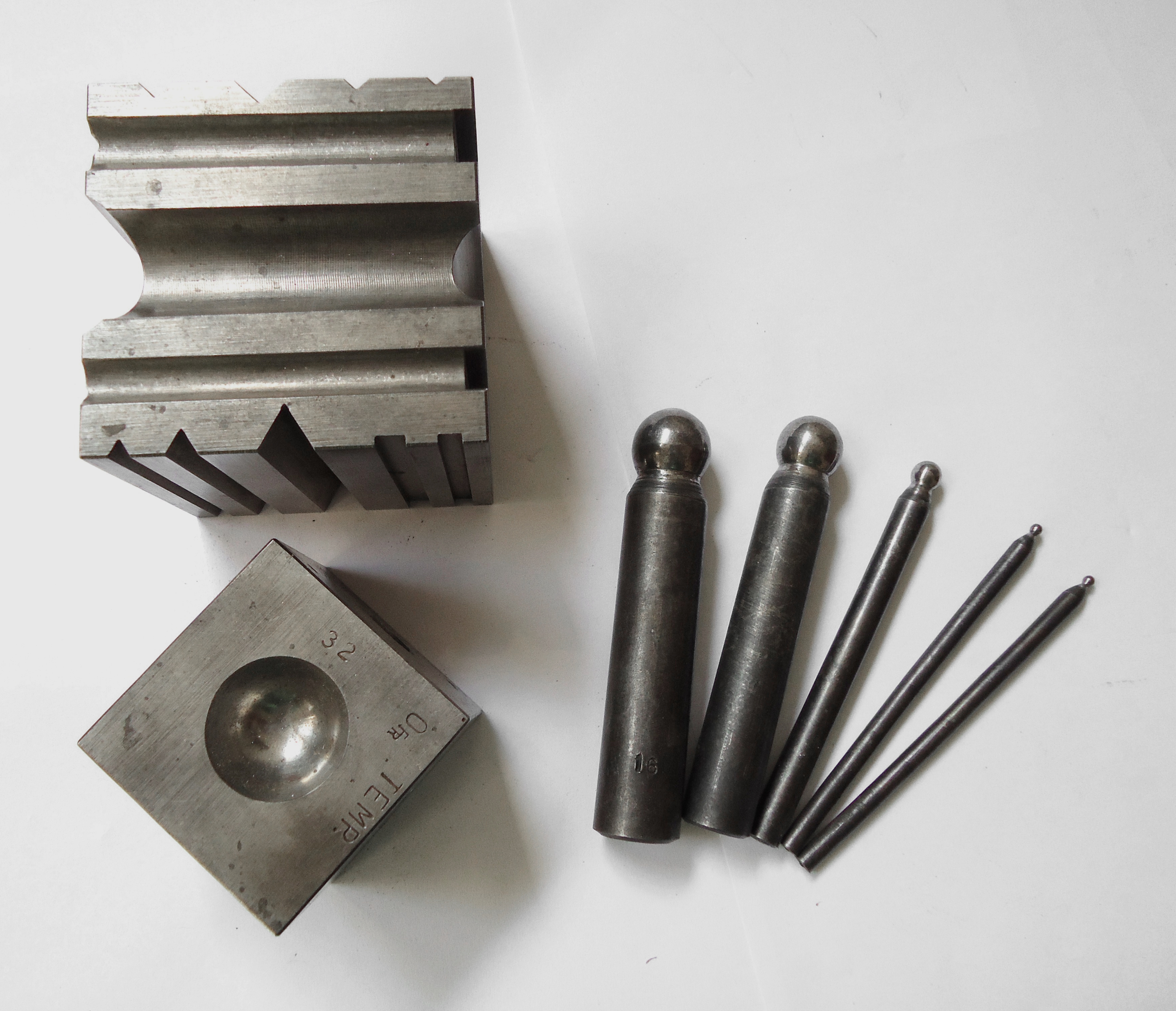
Swage block, doming block and doming punches used in jeweler's work

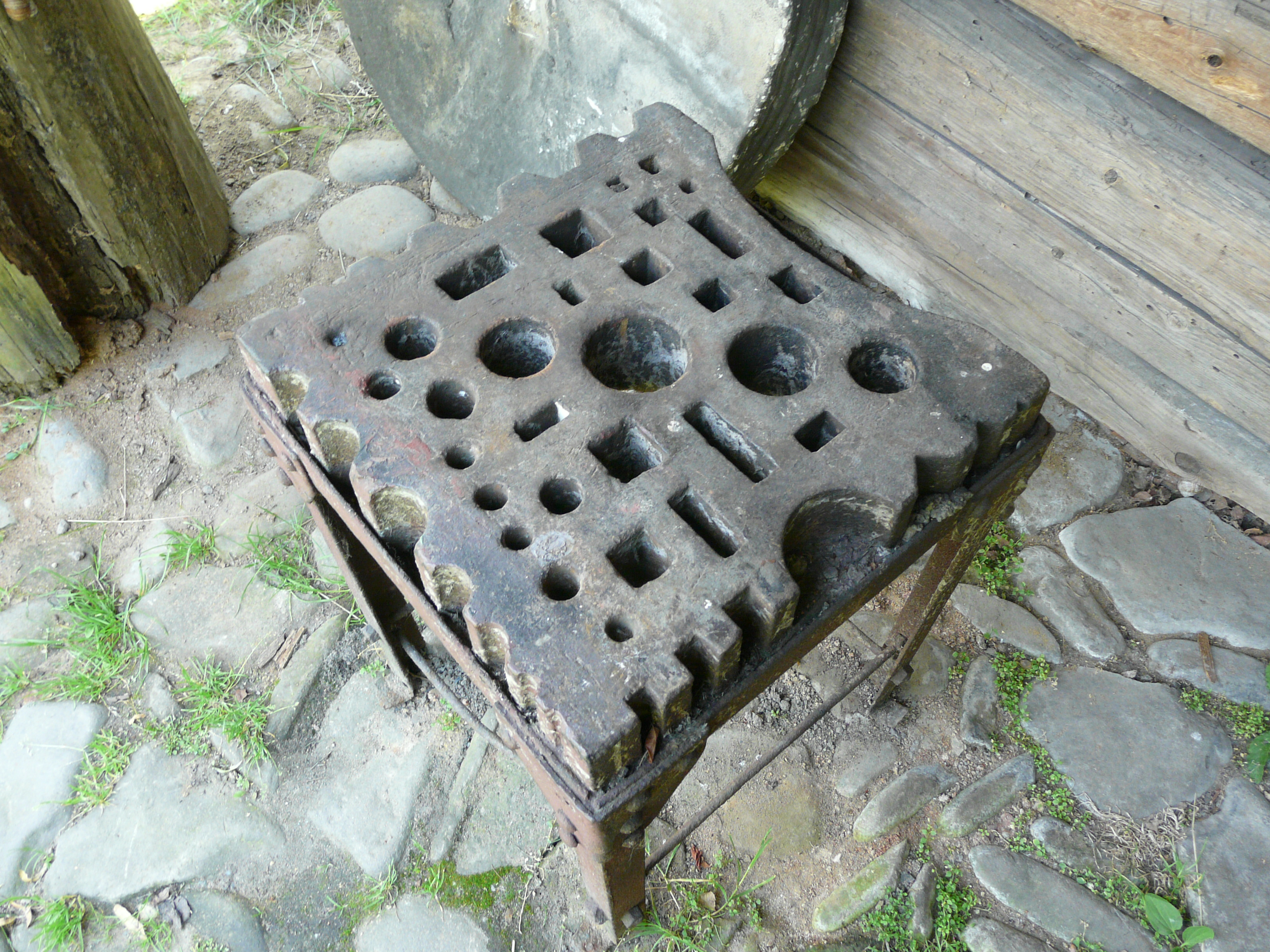
A large Polish swage block, mounted on a pedestal

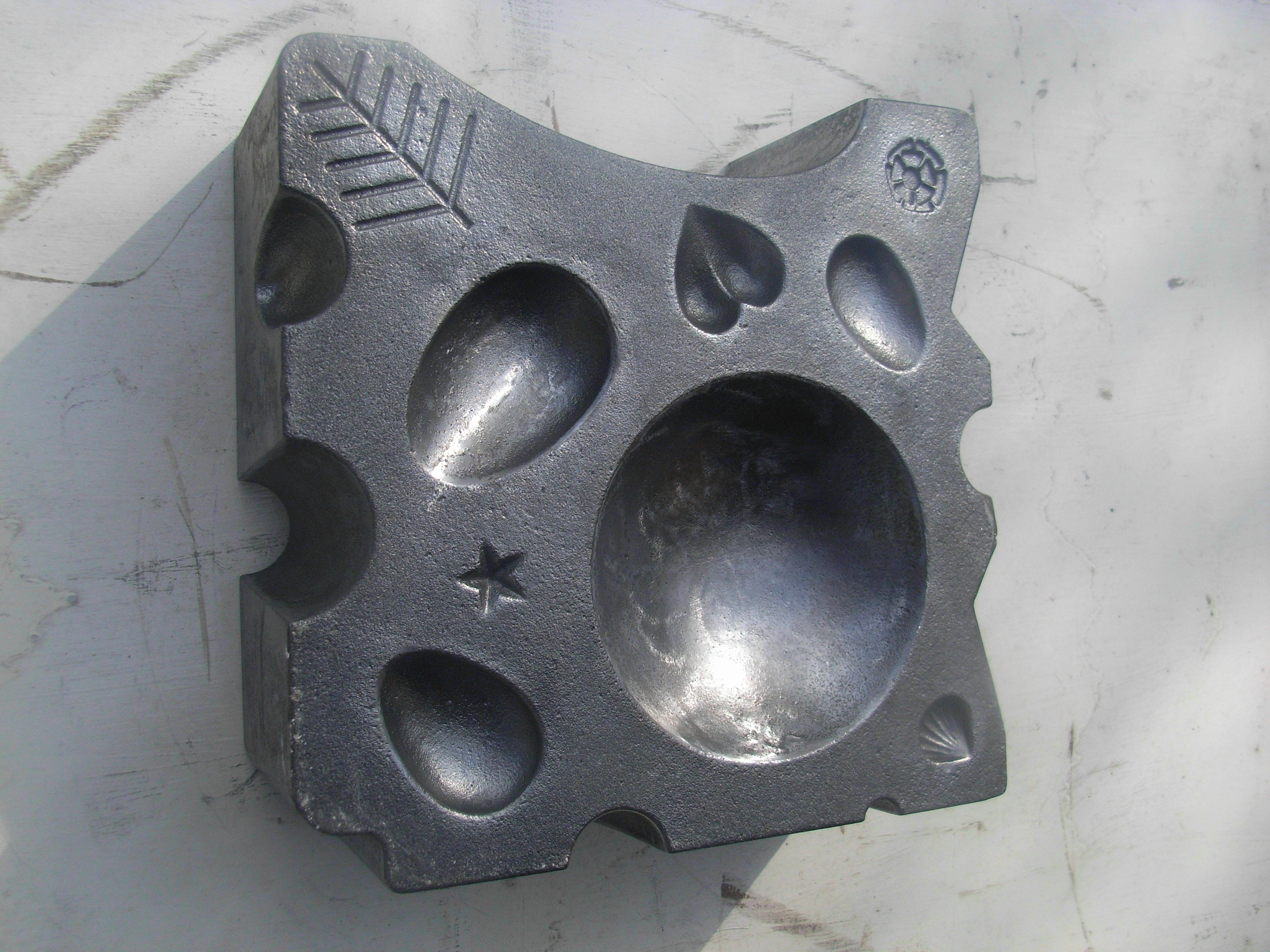
Base of blacksmith's swage block

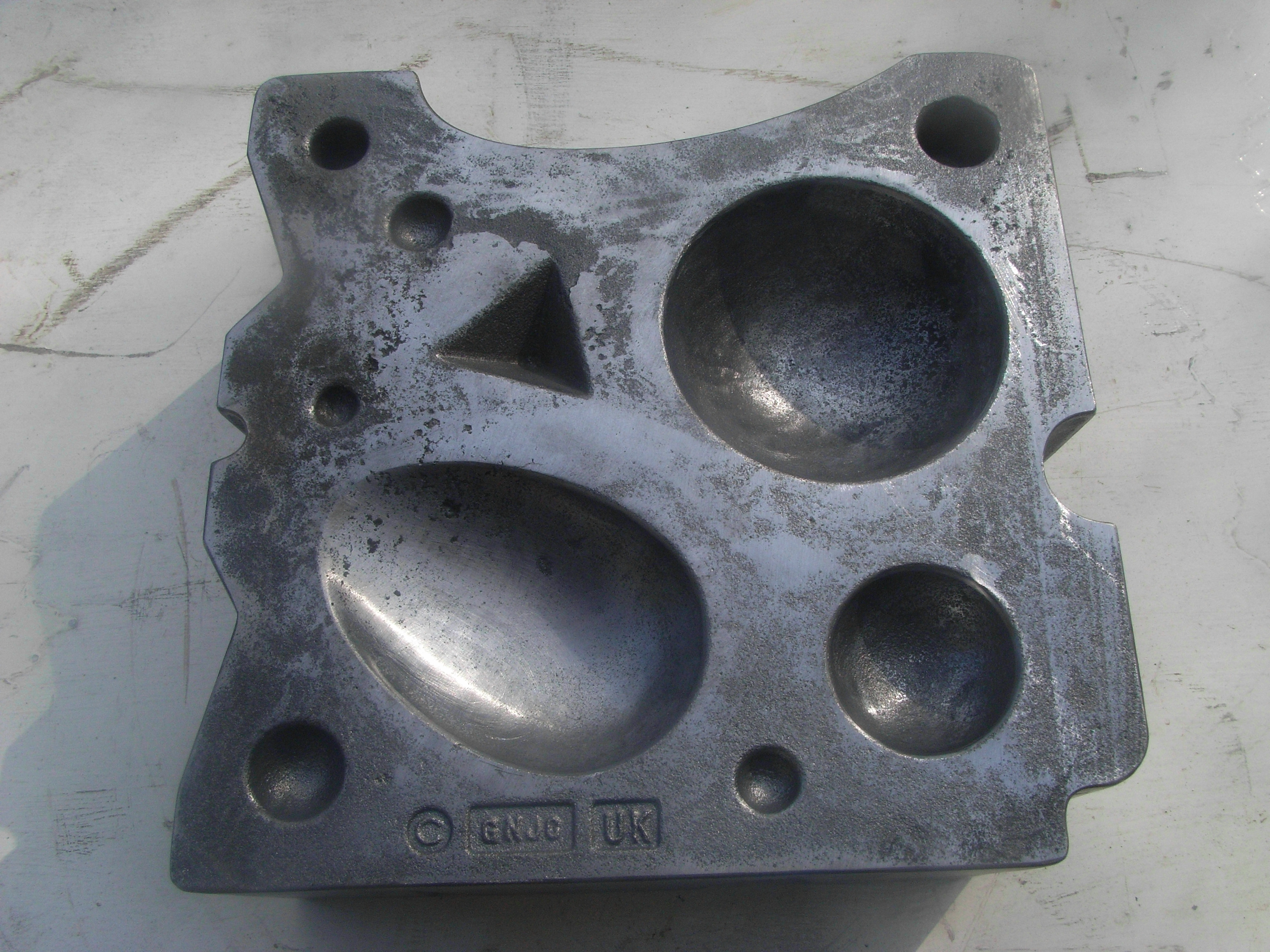
Top of blacksmith's swage block
