= Power hammer =

Mechanical forging hammer

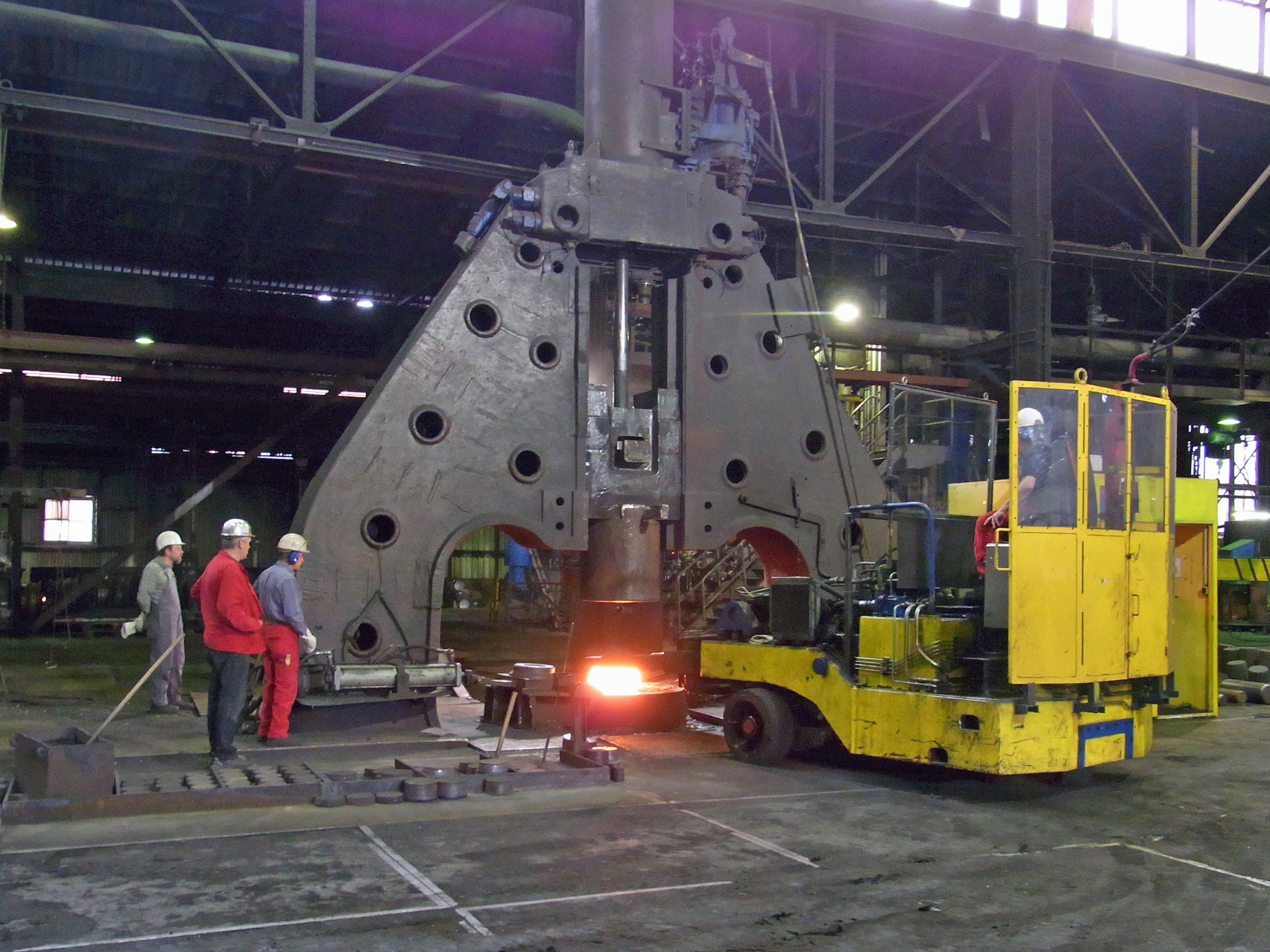
A power hammer

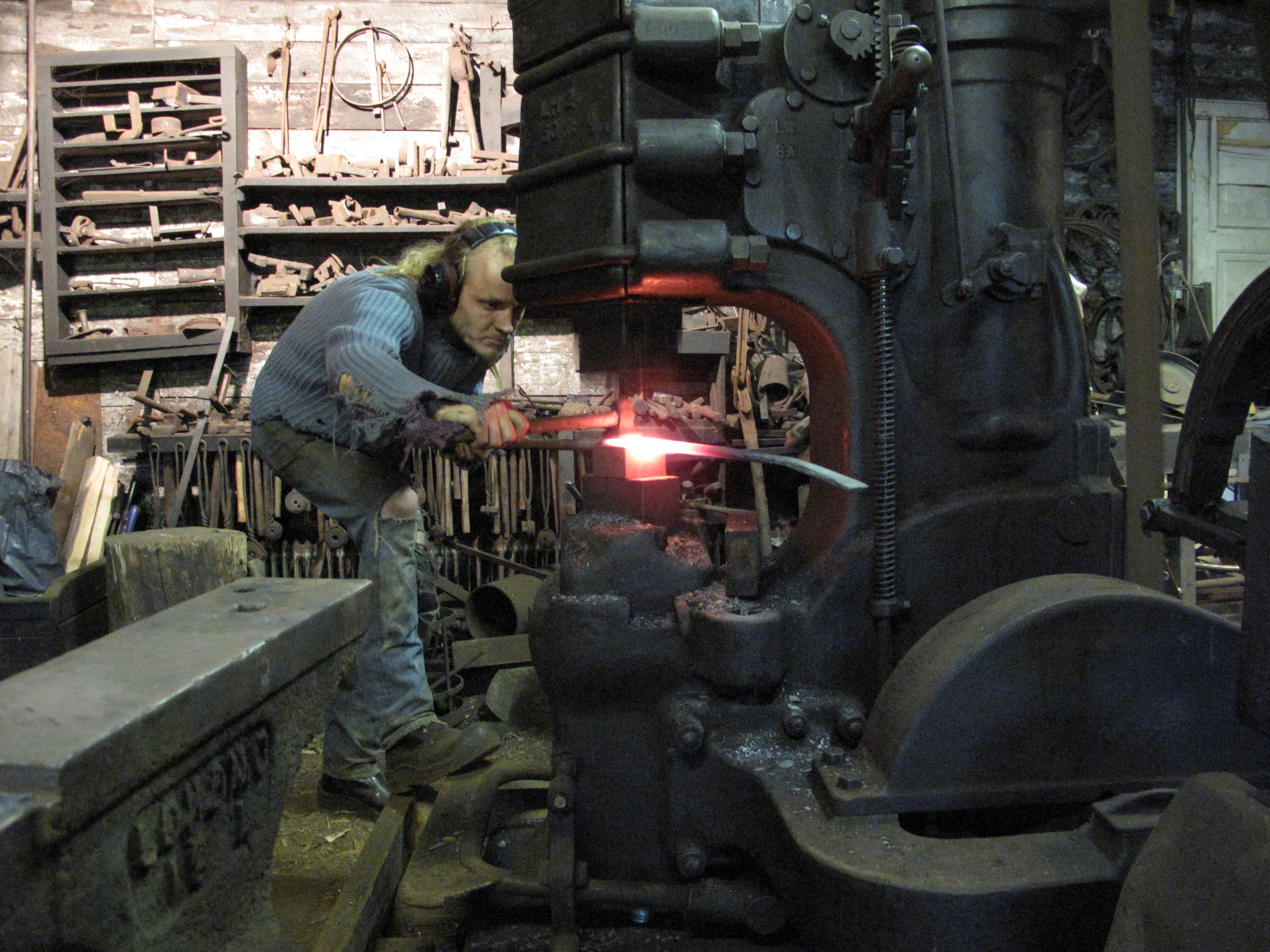
A blacksmith working with a 50-kilogram (110 lb) power hammer

Power hammers are mechanical forging hammers that use an electrical power source or steam to raise the hammer preparatory to striking, and accelerate it onto the work being hammered. They are also called open die power forging hammers. They have been used by blacksmiths, bladesmiths, metalworkers, and manufacturers since the late 1880s, having replaced trip hammers.

== Design and operation ==
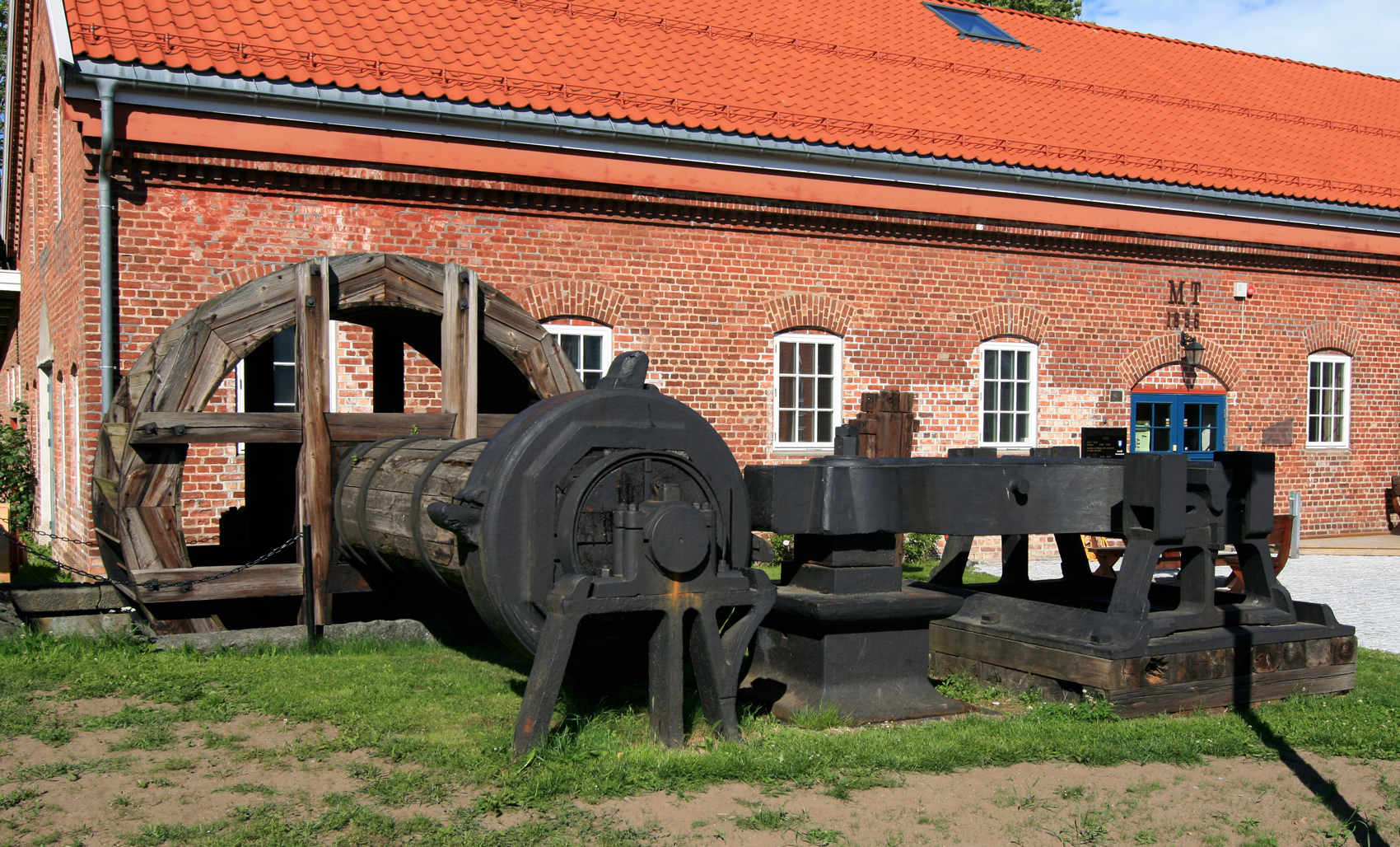
A water-powered trip hammer, predecessor to the power hammer

A typical power hammer consists of a frame, an anvil, and a reciprocating ram holding a hammer head or die. The workpiece is placed on the lower anvil or die, and the head or upper die strikes the workpiece. The power hammer is a direct descendant of the trip hammer, differing in that the power hammer stores potential energy in an arrangement of mechanical linkages and springs, in compressed air, or steam, and by the fact that it accelerates the ram on the downward stroke. This provides more force than simply allowing the weight to fall. Predecessors like trip hammers, steam drop hammers, board or strap hammers, used the power source to raise the ram or hammer head, but let it fall solely under gravity.

Power hammers are rated by the weight of the moving parts that act directly on the workpiece. This includes the weight of the parts that may consist of upper die, ram, mechanical linkage arms and spring(s) or ram, piston, and associated connecting rod(s). Specific design elements are dictated by the power source. The largest power hammer in 1893 was powered by steam and was rated at 125 short tons (113 t).

== Types ==
Power hammers are generally categorized by their power source.

=== Steam ===
Steam hammers use steam to drive the hammer. These tended to be the largest models as the great energy of steam was needed to operate them. A locomotive works was one location where such large hammers were needed and the workpieces were sometimes so large it required an overhead crane and several men to position the piece in the hammer, and a man to operate the machine.

=== Mechanical ===
Boat nail production in Hainan, China

These hammers tended to be smaller and were operated by a single man both holding the workpiece and operating the machine. The majority of these mechanical linkage machines were powered by line shaft flat belt systems or later electric motors that rotated a crank on the machine that drove the ram.

=== Air ===
Air-power hammers use pneumatics to drive the hammer.

== History ==
Steam and mechanical power hammers were made into the middle of the 20th century in the United States. At the end of the 19th century the mechanical power hammer became popular in smaller blacksmith and repair shops. These machines were typically rated between 25 and 500 pounds (11 and 227 kg) of falling weight. Many may still be seen in use in small manufacturing and artist-blacksmith shops today. In the middle of the 20th century power hammers driven by compressed air began to gain popularity, and several manufacturers are currently producing these hammers today.
