= Acragas (mythology) =

River god in Greek mythology

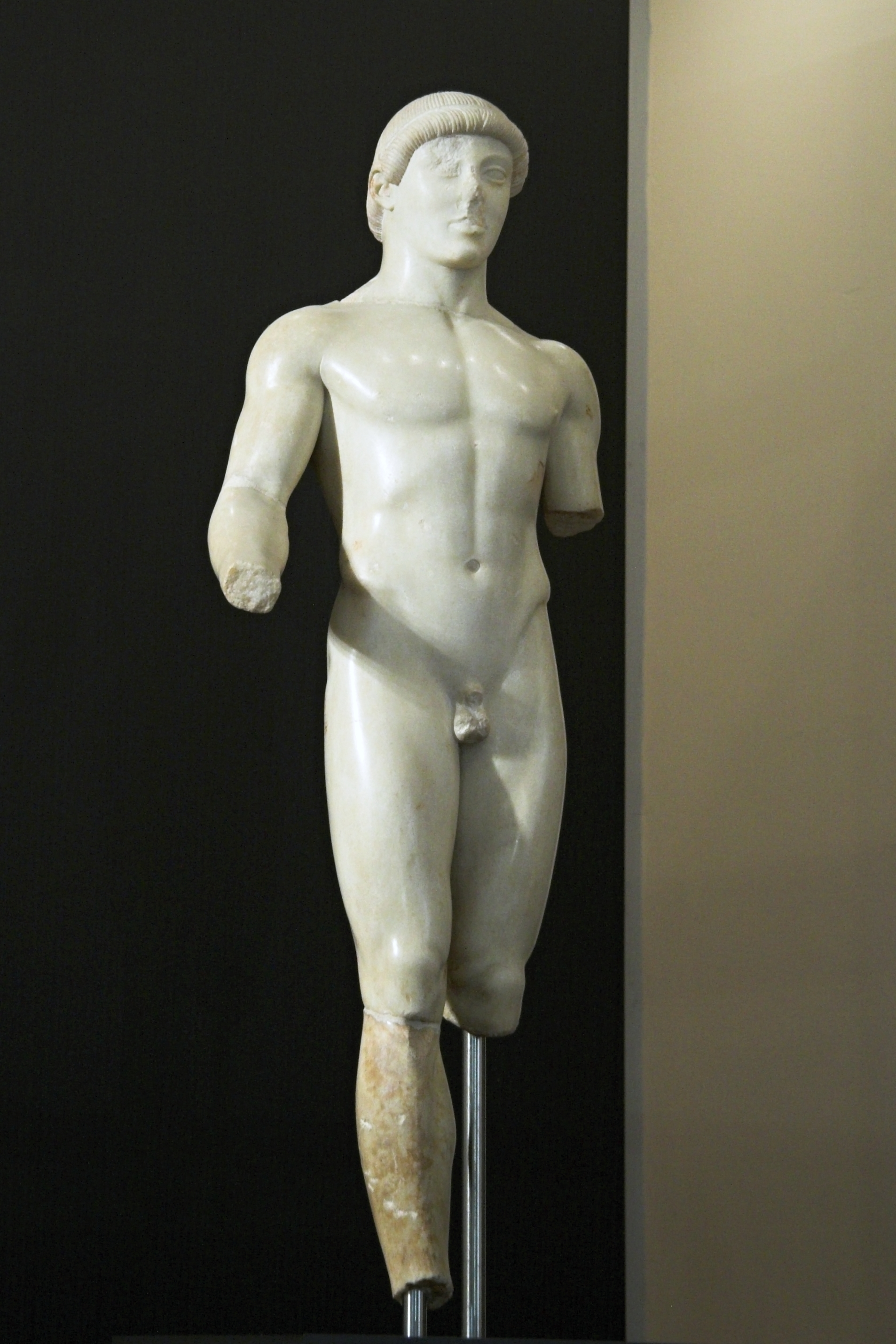
The Ephebe of Agrigento, hypothesized to depict the river Acragas

In Greek mythology, Acragas or Akragas (Ancient Greek: Ἀκράγας, romanized: Akrágas, lit. 'crab') was a river god said to be a son of Zeus and the Oceanid Asterope. The town of Acragas (modern Agrigento) in Sicily takes its name from the river, which flows to the east of the plateau on which the town was built.

The name "Acragas" likely originates from the Greek karkinos (crab), due to a large population of crabs in its waters.
