= Acragas (silversmith) =

Ancient silversmith in the Roman Empire

Acragas (Gr. Ακράγας) was an engraver, or silversmith, spoken of by Pliny the Elder. It is not known either when or where he was born.

Pliny says that Acragas, Boethus and Mys were considered but little inferior to Mentor, an artist of great note in the same profession; and that works of all three were in existence in his day, preserved in different temples in the island of Rhodes. Those of Acragas, who was especially famed for his representations of hunting scenes on cups, were in the temple of Bacchus at Rhodes, and consisted of cups with figures of Bacchae and Centaurs graved on them. If the language of Pliny justifies us in inferring that the three artists whom he classes together lived at the same time, that would fix the age of Acragas in the latter part of the fifth century BC, as Mys was a contemporary of Phidias.
