= Anvil =

Metalworking tool

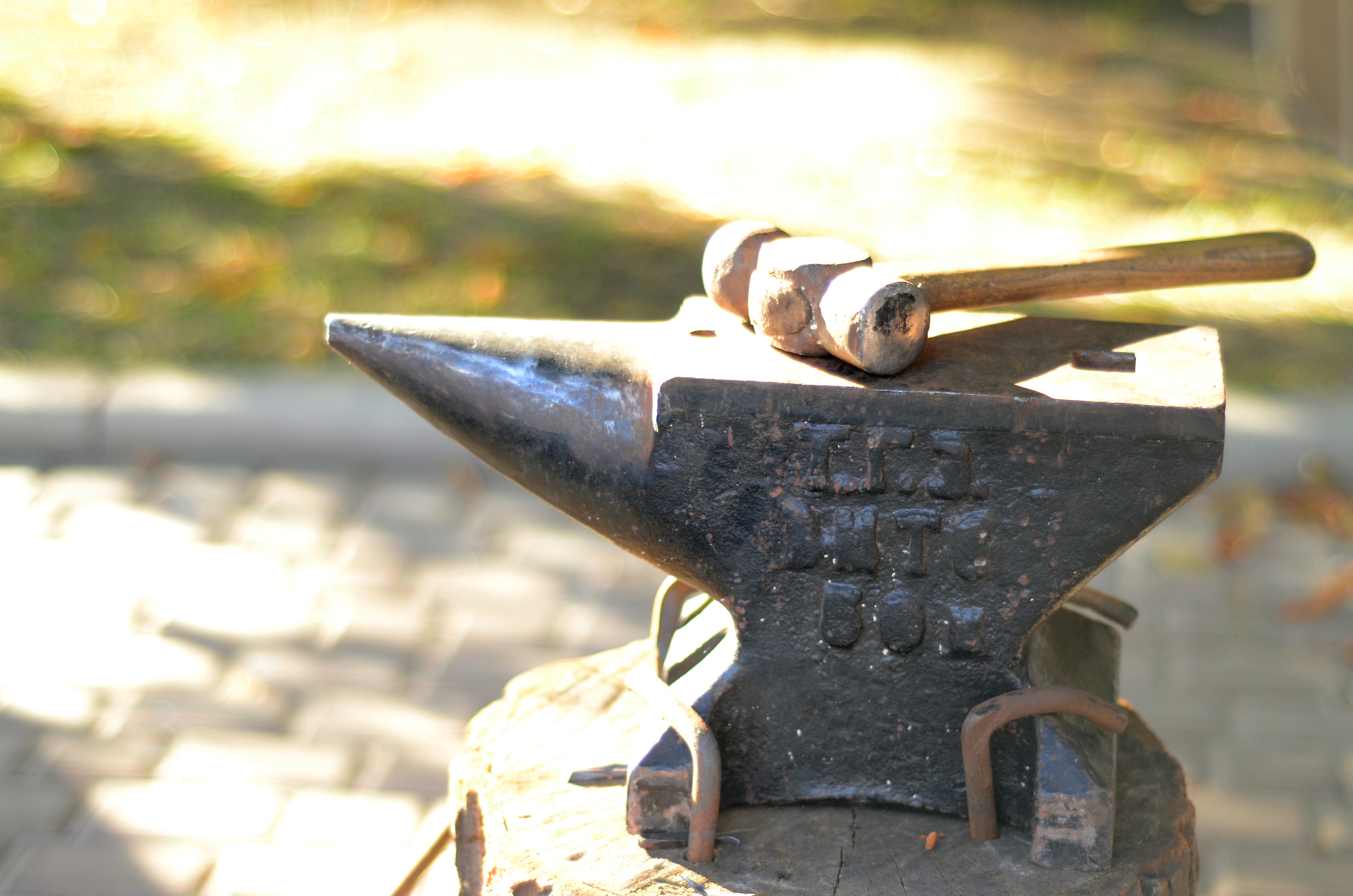
Single-horn anvil

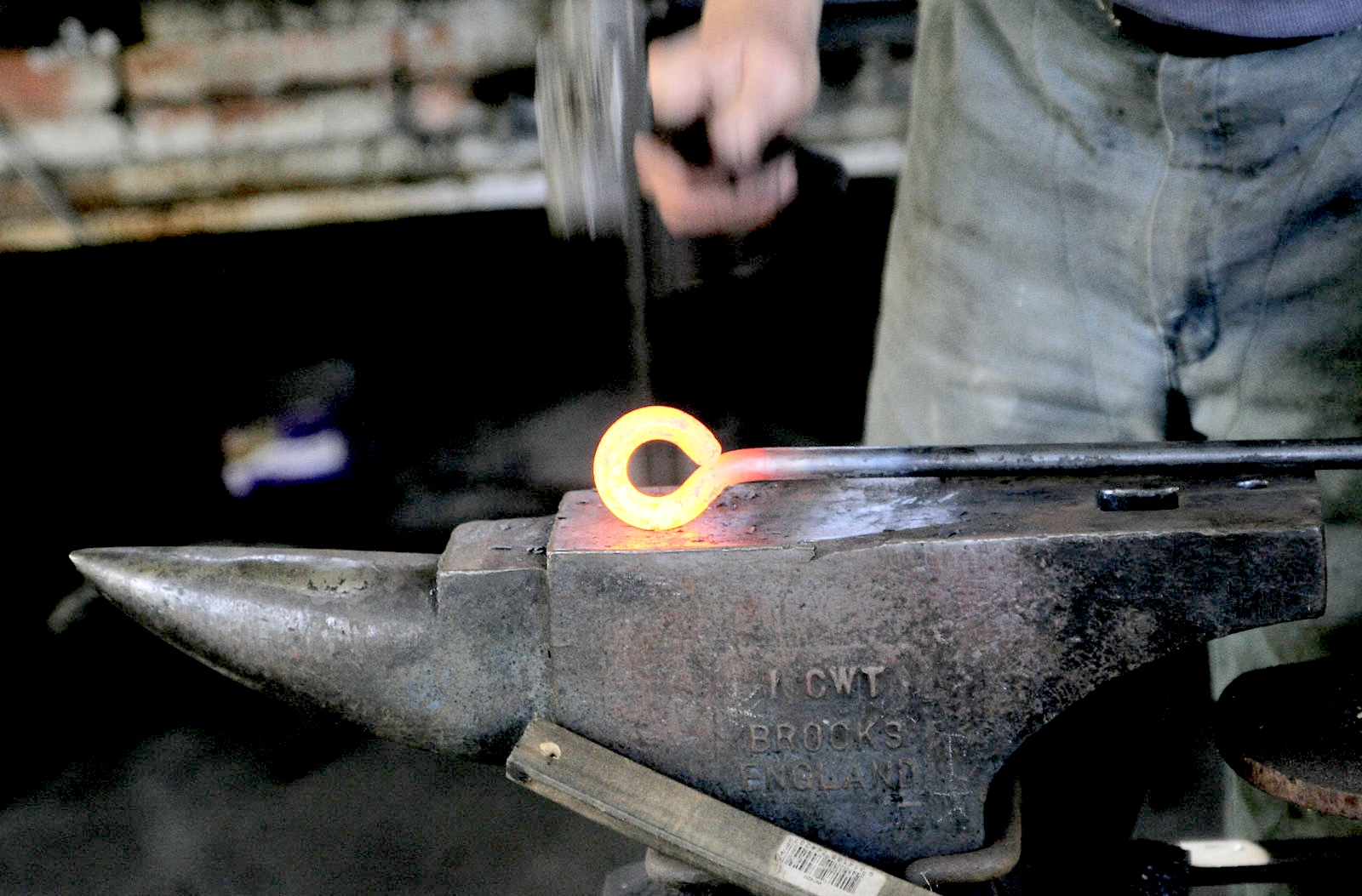
A blacksmith working iron with a hammer and anvil

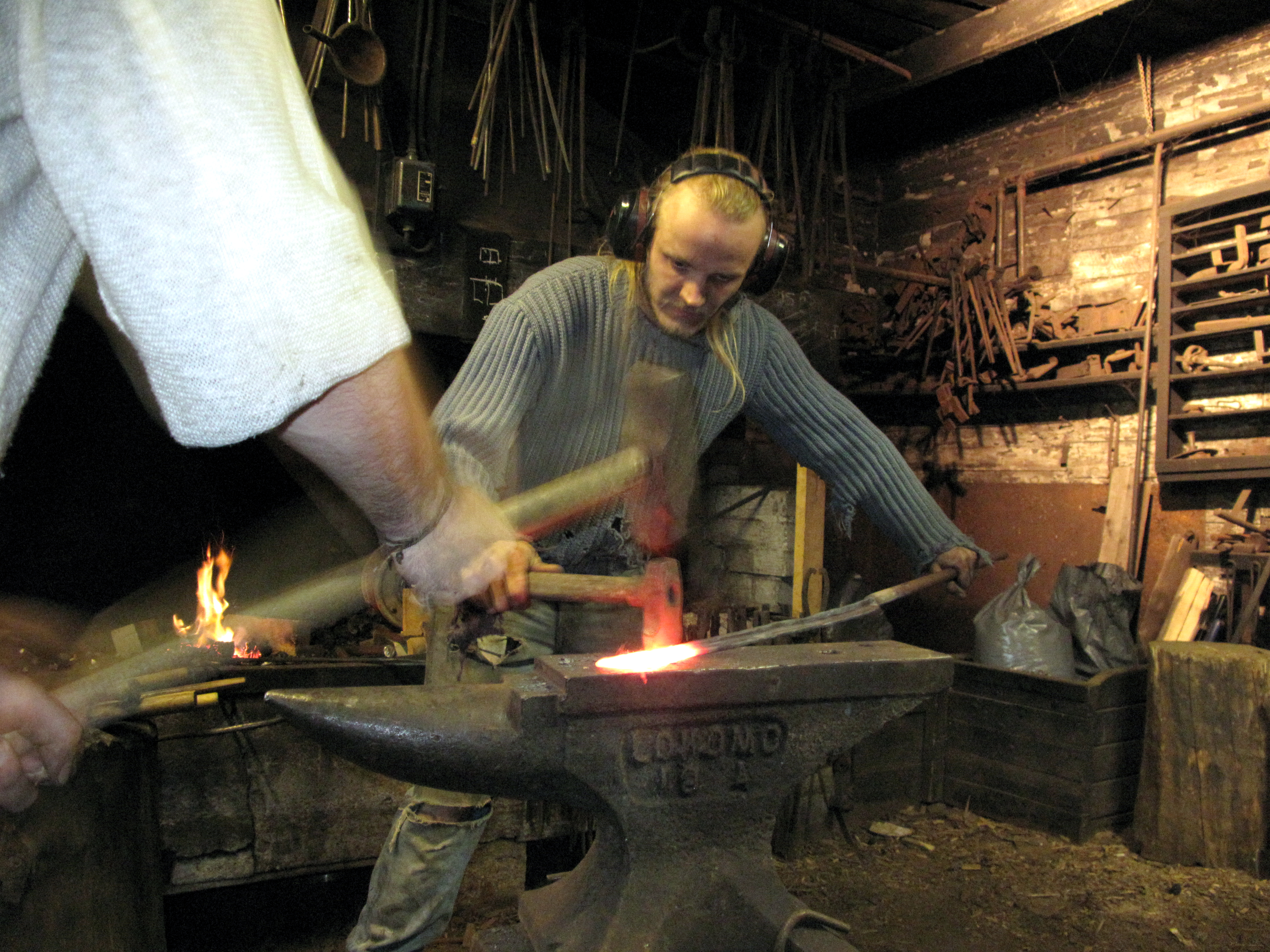
A blacksmith working with a sledgehammer, assistant (striker) and Lokomo anvil in Finland

An anvil is a metalworking tool consisting of a large block of metal (usually forged or cast steel), with a flattened top surface, upon which another object is struck (or "worked").

Anvils are massive because having higher inertia allows them to more efficiently cause the energy of striking tools to be transferred to the work piece. In most cases an anvil is used as a forging tool. Before the advent of modern welding technology, it was the primary tool of metal workers.

A great majority of modern anvils are made of cast steel that has been heat-treated by either flame or electric induction. Inexpensive anvils have been made of cast iron and low-quality steel, but are considered unsuitable for serious use, as they deform and lack rebound when struck.

== Structure ==
Parts of a single-horn anvil

The primary work surface of the anvil is known as the face. It is generally made of hardened steel and should be flat and smooth with rounded edges for most work. Any marks on the face will be transferred to the work. Also, sharp edges tend to cut into the metal being worked and may cause cracks to form in the workpiece. The face is hardened and tempered to resist the blows of the smith's hammer, so the anvil face does not deform under repeated use. A hard anvil face also reduces the amount of force lost in each hammer blow. Hammers, tools, and work pieces of hardened steel should never directly strike the anvil face with full force, as they may damage it; this can result in chipping or deforming of the anvil face.

The horn of the anvil is a conical projection used to form various round shapes and is generally unhardened steel or iron. The horn is used mostly in bending operations. It also is used by some smiths as an aid in "drawing down" stock (making it longer and thinner). Some anvils, mainly European, are made with two horns, one square and one round. Also, some anvils are made with side horns or clips for specialized work.

The step is the area of the anvil between the "horn" and the "face". It is soft and is used for cutting; its purpose is to prevent damaging the steel face of the anvil by conducting such operations there and so as not to damage the cutting edge of the chisel, though many smiths shun this practice as it will damage the anvil over time.

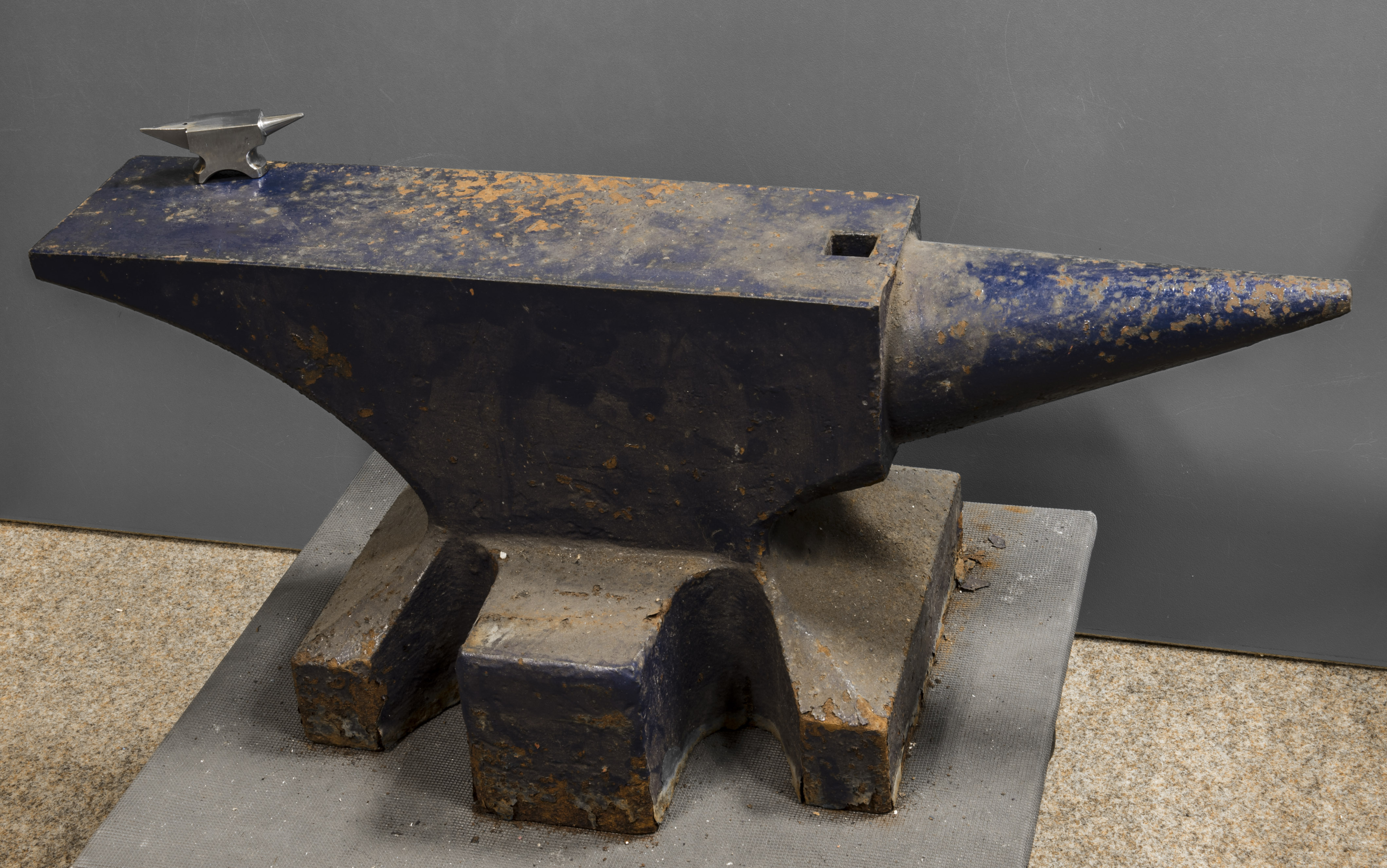
Anvil with upsetting block

There have also been other additions to the anvil such as an upsetting block; this is used to upset steel, generally in long strips/bars as it is placed between the feet of the anvil. Upsetting is a technique often used by blacksmiths for making the steel workpiece short and thick, having probably been originally long and thin.

The hardy hole is a square hole into which specialized forming and cutting tools, called hardy tools, are placed. It is also used in punching and bending operations. These are not to be confused with swage blocks, although their purpose is similar.

The pritchel hole is a small round hole that is present on most modern anvils. Some anvils have more than one. It is used mostly for punching. At times, smiths will fit a second tool to this hole to allow the smith more flexibility when using more than one anvil tool.

== Placement ==
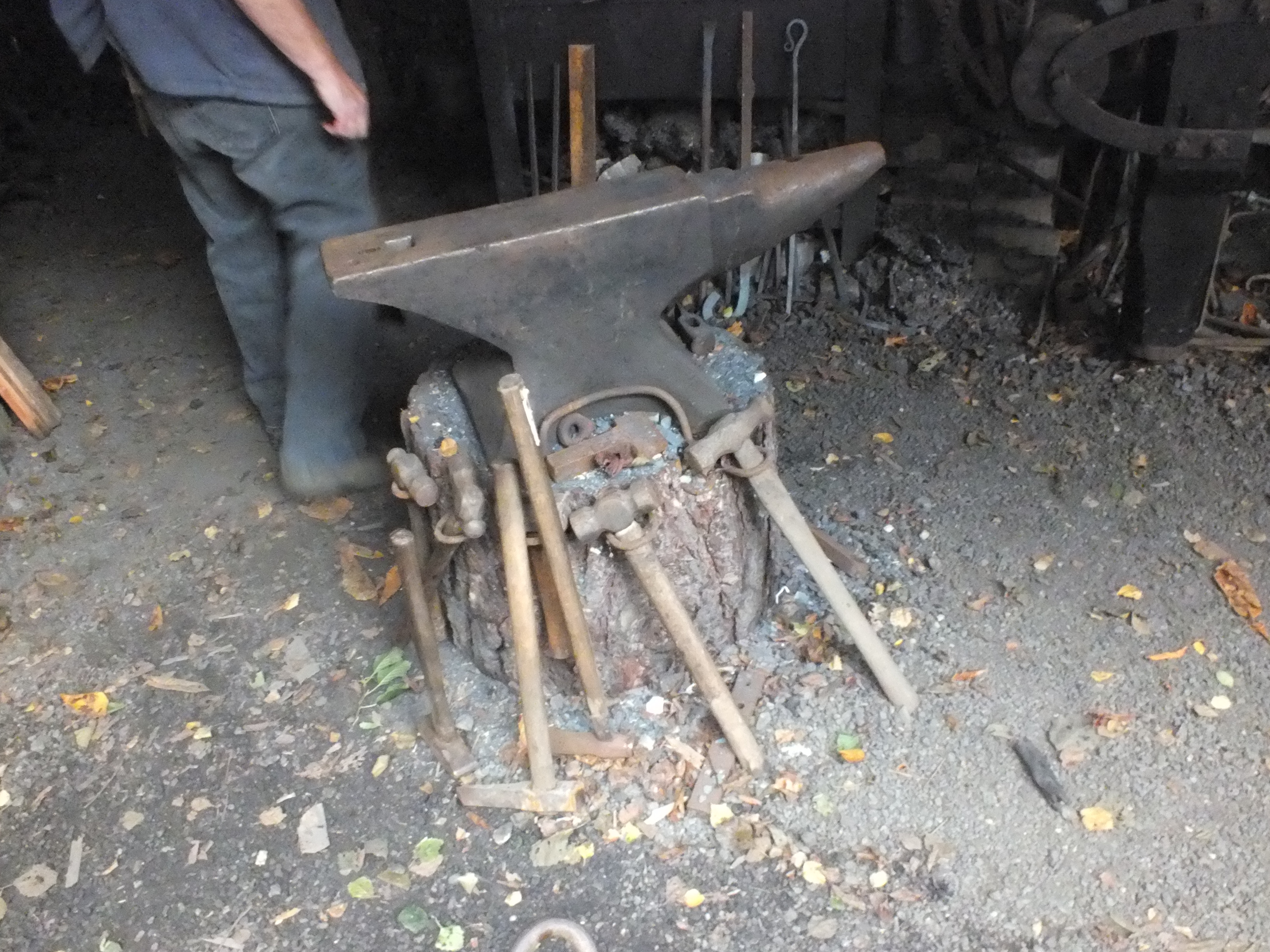
Blacksmith's anvil mounted on a log

The anvil is placed as near to the forge as is convenient, generally no more than one step from the forge to prevent heat loss in the work piece. An anvil needs to be placed upon a sturdy base made from an impact and fire resistant material. Common methods of attaching an anvil are spikes, chains, steel or iron straps, clips, bolts where there are holes provided, and cables.

The most common base traditionally was a hard wood log or large timber buried several feet into the floor of the forge shop. In the industrial era, cast-iron bases became available. They had the advantage of adding additional weight to the anvil, making it more stable. These bases are highly sought after by collectors today. When concrete became widely available, there was a trend to make steel-reinforced anvil bases by some smiths, though this practice has largely been abandoned. In more modern times, anvils have been placed upon bases fabricated from steel, often a short thick section of a large I-beam. In addition, bases have been made from dimensional lumber bolted together to form a large block or steel drums full of oil-saturated sand to provide a damping effect. In recent times, tripod bases of fabricated steel have become popular.

== Types ==
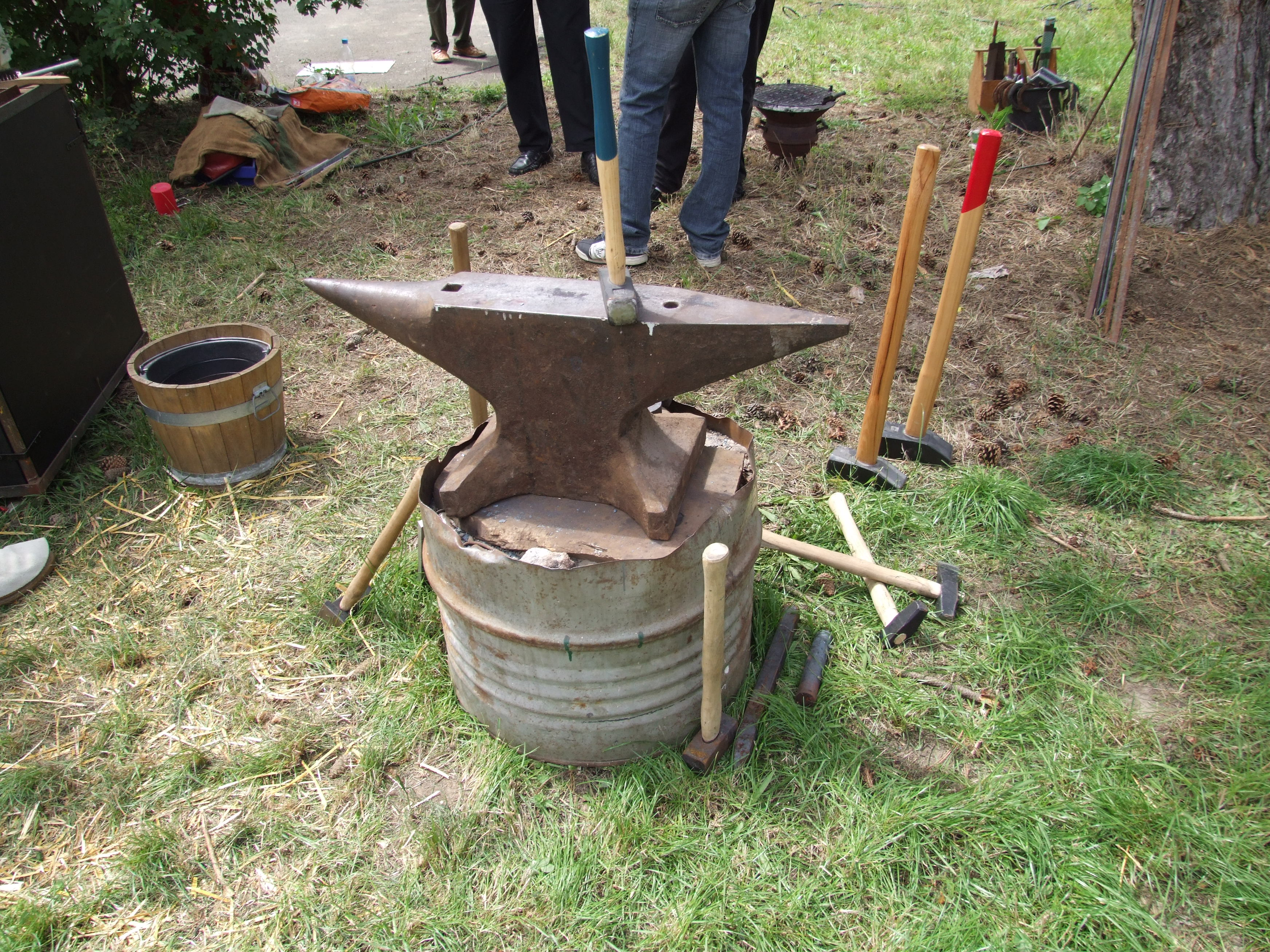
Anvil of a farrier

There are many designs for anvils, which are often tailored for a specific purpose or to meet the needs of a particular smith. For example, there were anvils specifically made for farriers, general smiths, cutlers, chain makers, armorers, saw tuners, coach makers, coopers, and many other types of metal workers. Most of these anvil types look similar, but some are radically different. Saw maker anvils, for instance, are generally large rectangular blocks of steel that have a harder surface than most other anvils due to hammering on a harder steel for saws. Bladesmith anvils tend to be rectangular with a hardy and pritchel, but no horn. Such designs have originated in diverse geographic locations. Several styles of anvils include Bavarian, French Pig anvil, Austrian, and Chinese turtle anvil.

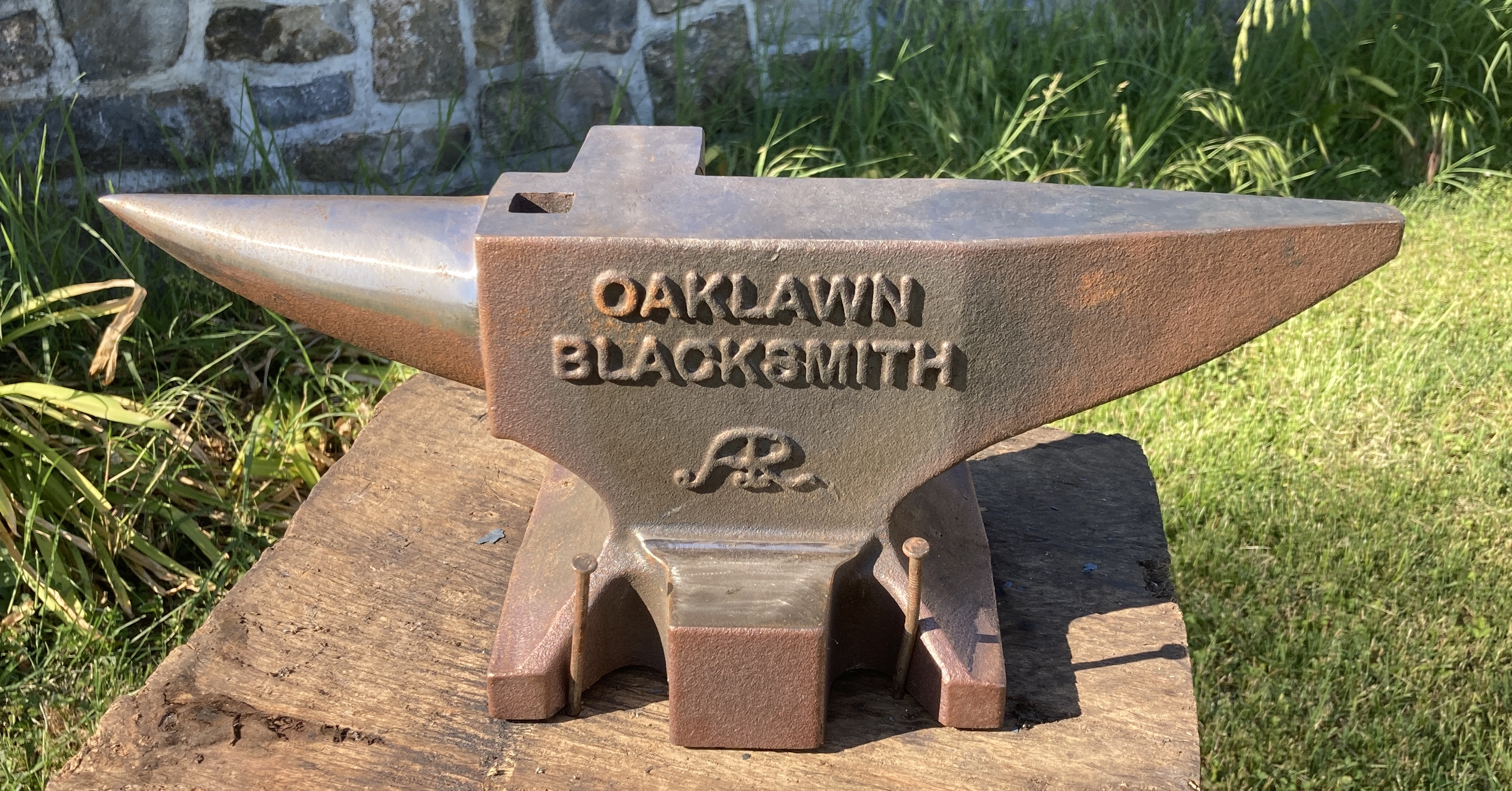
45-pound (20-kg) Bavarian-style anvil

The Bavarian style is known for the sloped brow. The brow was first used in medieval times to make armor on the church windows below the brow. Common manufactures include Söding Halbach and Holthaus. This style of anvil is known not to sway in the face due to the extra mass with the brow.

The common blacksmith's anvil is made of either forged or cast steel, forged wrought iron with a hard steel face or cast iron with a hard steel face. Cast-iron anvils are not used for forging as they are incapable of standing up to the impact and will crack and dent. Also, cast-iron anvils without a hard steel face do not have the rebound that a harder anvil would and will tire out the smith. Historically, some anvils have been made with a smooth top working face of hardened steel welded to a cast-iron or wrought-iron body, though this manufacturing method is no longer in use. At one end, the common smith's anvil has a projecting conical bick (beak, horn) used for hammering curved work pieces. The other end is typically called the heel. Occasionally, the other end is also provided with a bick, partly rectangular in section. Most anvils made since the late 18th century also have a hardy hole and a pritchel hole where various tools, such as the anvil-cutter or hot chisel, can be inserted and held by the anvil. Some anvils have several hardy and pritchel holes, to accommodate a wider variety of hardy tools and pritchels. An anvil may also have a softer pad for chisel work.

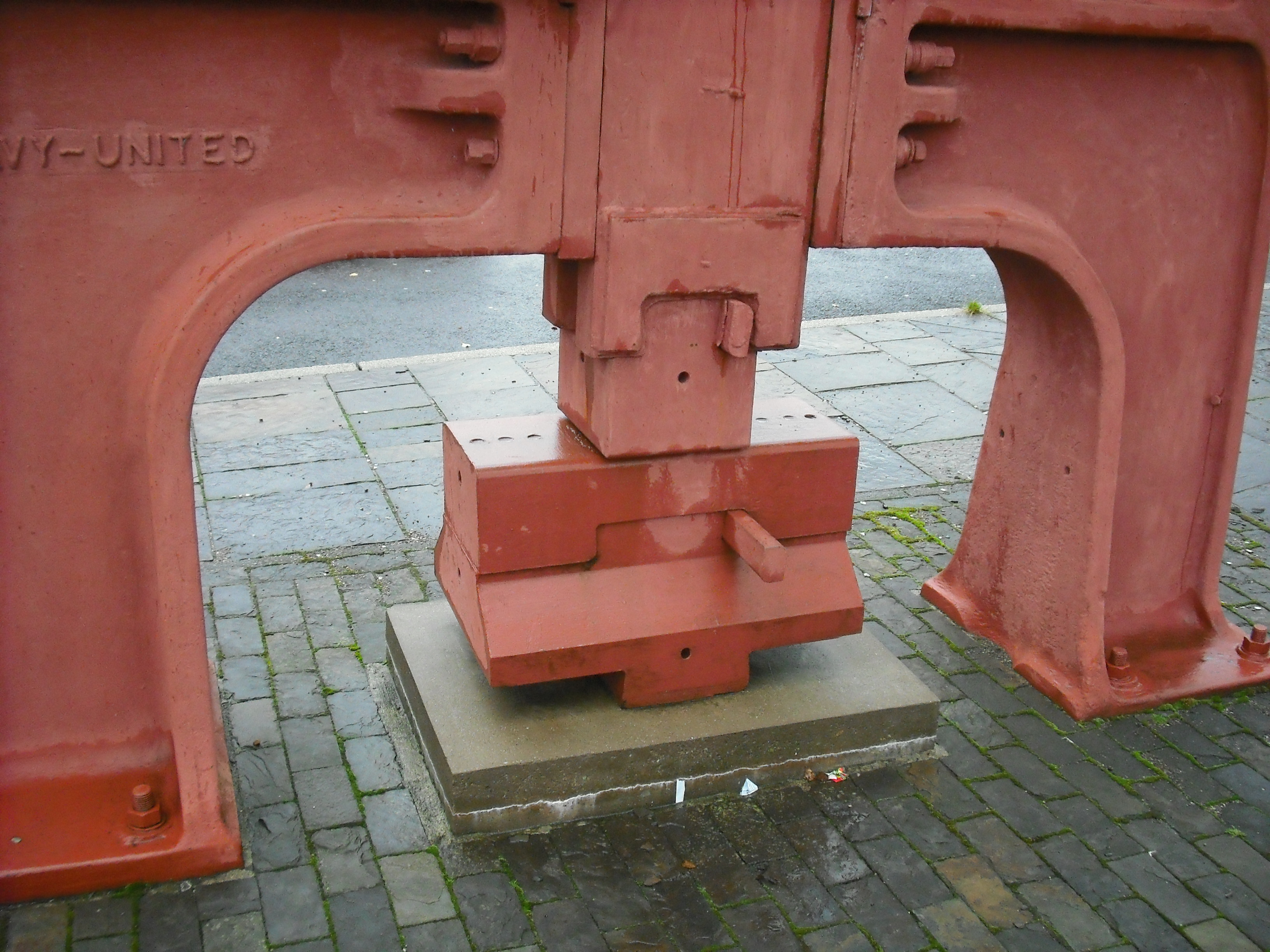
Steam hammer anvil

An anvil for a power hammer is usually supported on a massive anvil block, sometimes weighing over 800 tons for a 12-ton hammer; this again rests on a strong foundation of timber and masonry or concrete.

An anvil may have a marking indicating its weight, manufacturer, or place of origin. American-made anvils were often marked in pounds. European anvils are sometimes marked in kilograms. English anvils were often marked in hundredweight, the marking consisting of three numbers, indicating hundredweight, quarter hundredweight and pounds. For example, a 3-1-5, if such an anvil existed, would be 3×112 lb + 1×28 lb + 5 lb = 369 lb ≈ 168 kg.

Cheap anvils made from inferior steel or cast iron and often sold at retail hardware stores, are considered unsuitable for serious use, and are often derisively referred to as "ASOs", or "anvil shaped objects". In recent years, inexpensive cast steel anvils with hardened faces have become common, often sold online. Some blacksmiths consider these anvils suitable for beginners. Amateur smiths have used lengths of railroad rail, forklift tines, or even simple blocks of steel as makeshift anvils.

A metalworking vise may have a small anvil integrated into its design.

== History ==
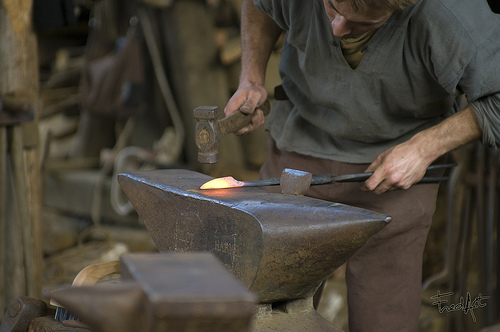
An anvil at the medieval construction site of Guédelon in Treigny, France.

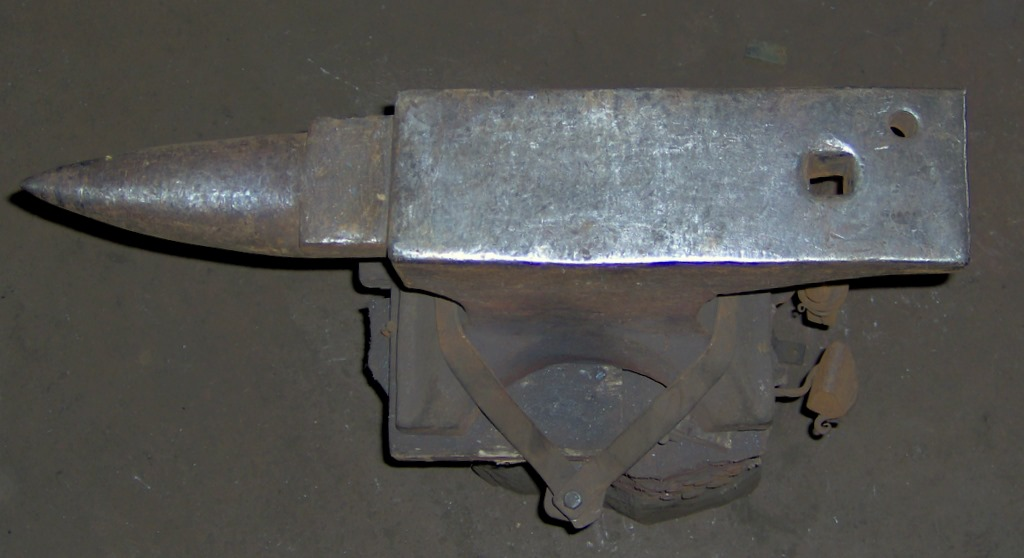
A top view of a well-used London pattern anvil

Anvils were first made of stone, then bronze, and later wrought iron. As steel became more readily available, anvils were faced with it. This was done to give the anvil a hard face and to stop the anvil from deforming from impact. Many regional styles of anvils evolved through time from the simple block that was first used by smiths. The majority of anvils found today in the US are based on the London pattern anvil of the mid-19th century ce.

The wrought-iron steel-faced anvil was produced up until the early 20th century. Through the 19th and very early 20th centuries, this method of construction evolved to produce extremely high-quality anvils. The basic process involved forge-welding billets of wrought iron together to produce the desired shape. The sequence and location of the forge-welds varied between different anvil makers and the kind of anvil being made. At the same time cast-iron anvils with steel faces were being made in the United States. At the dawn of the 20th century solid cast-steel anvils began to be produced, as well as two-piece forged anvils made from closed-die forgings. Modern anvils are generally made entirely from steel.

There are many references to anvils in ancient Greek and Egyptian writings, including Homer's works. They have been found at the Calico Early Man Site in North America.

Anvils have since lost their former commonness, along with the smiths who used them. Mechanized production has made cheap and abundant manufactured goods readily available. The one-off handmade products of the blacksmith are less economically viable in the modern world, while in the past they were an absolute necessity. However, anvils are still used by blacksmiths and metal workers of all kinds in producing custom work. They are also essential to the work done by farriers.

== In popular culture ==
A fiery anvil in the coat of arms of the Tohmajärvi municipality

=== Firing ===
Anvil firing is the practice of firing an anvil into the air using gunpowder. It has been popular in California, the eastern United States and the southern United States, much like how fireworks are used today. There is a growing interest in re-enacting this "ancient tradition" in the US, which has now spread to England.

=== Television and film ===
A typical metalworker's anvil, with horn at one end and flat face at the other, is a standard prop for cartoon gags, as the epitome of a heavy and clumsy object that is perfect for dropping onto people. This visual metaphor is common, for example, in Warner Brothers' Looney Tunes and Merrie Melodies shorts, such as those with Wile E. Coyote and the Road Runner. An episode of Gilmore Girls referred to anvils in cartoons when one of the main characters tries to have a conversation about "Where did all the anvils go?", a reference to their falling out of use on a general scale. Animaniacs made frequent gags on the topic throughout its run, even having a kingdom named Anvilania, whose sole national product is anvils.

=== Books ===
Dwarves were blacksmiths who used anvils for metalworking in C. S. Lewis's The Chronicles of Narnia, most iconically on The Magician's Nephew and Prince Caspian; as well as in J. R. R. Tolkien's The Hobbit.

=== Music ===
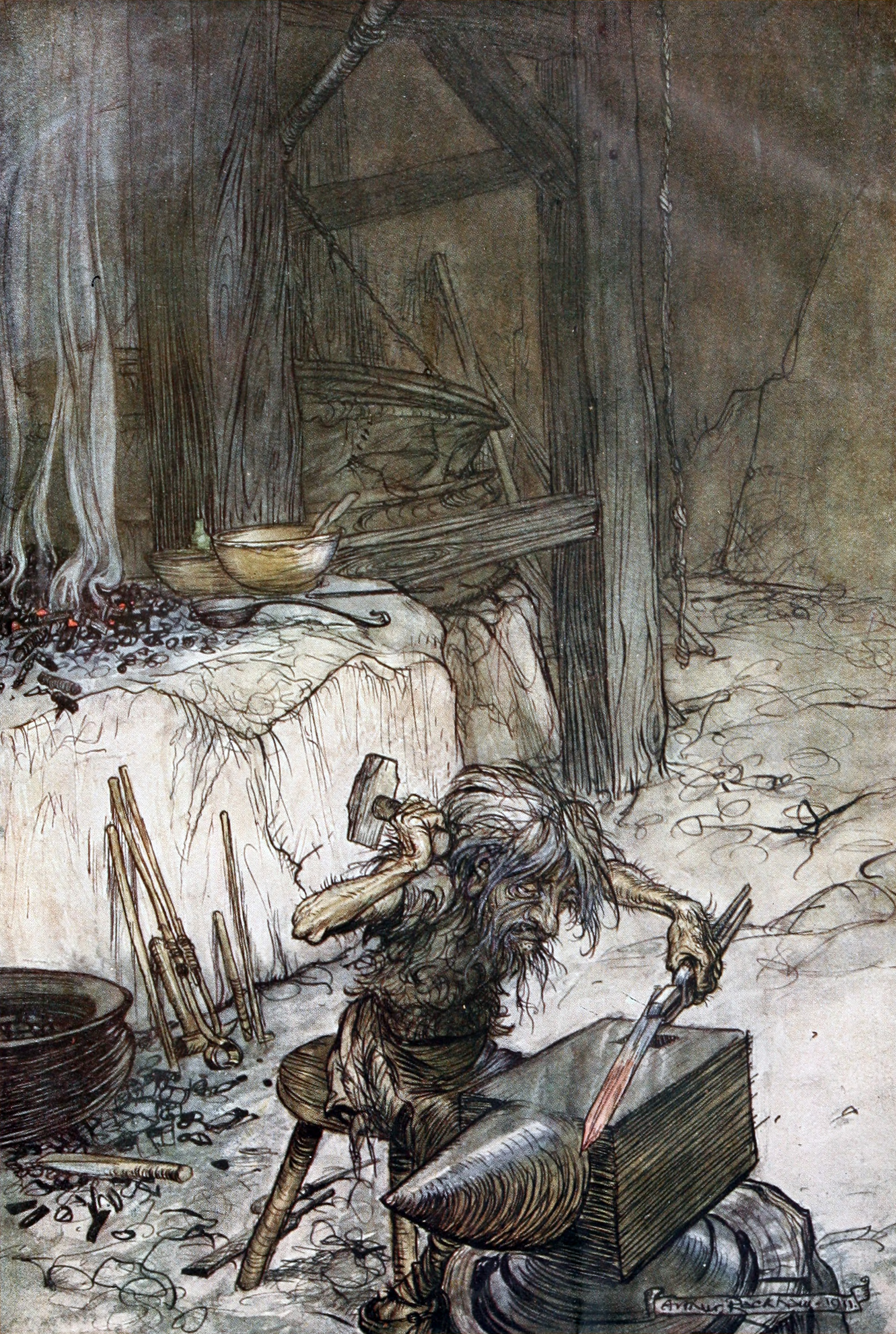
Mime at the anvil by Arthur Rackham

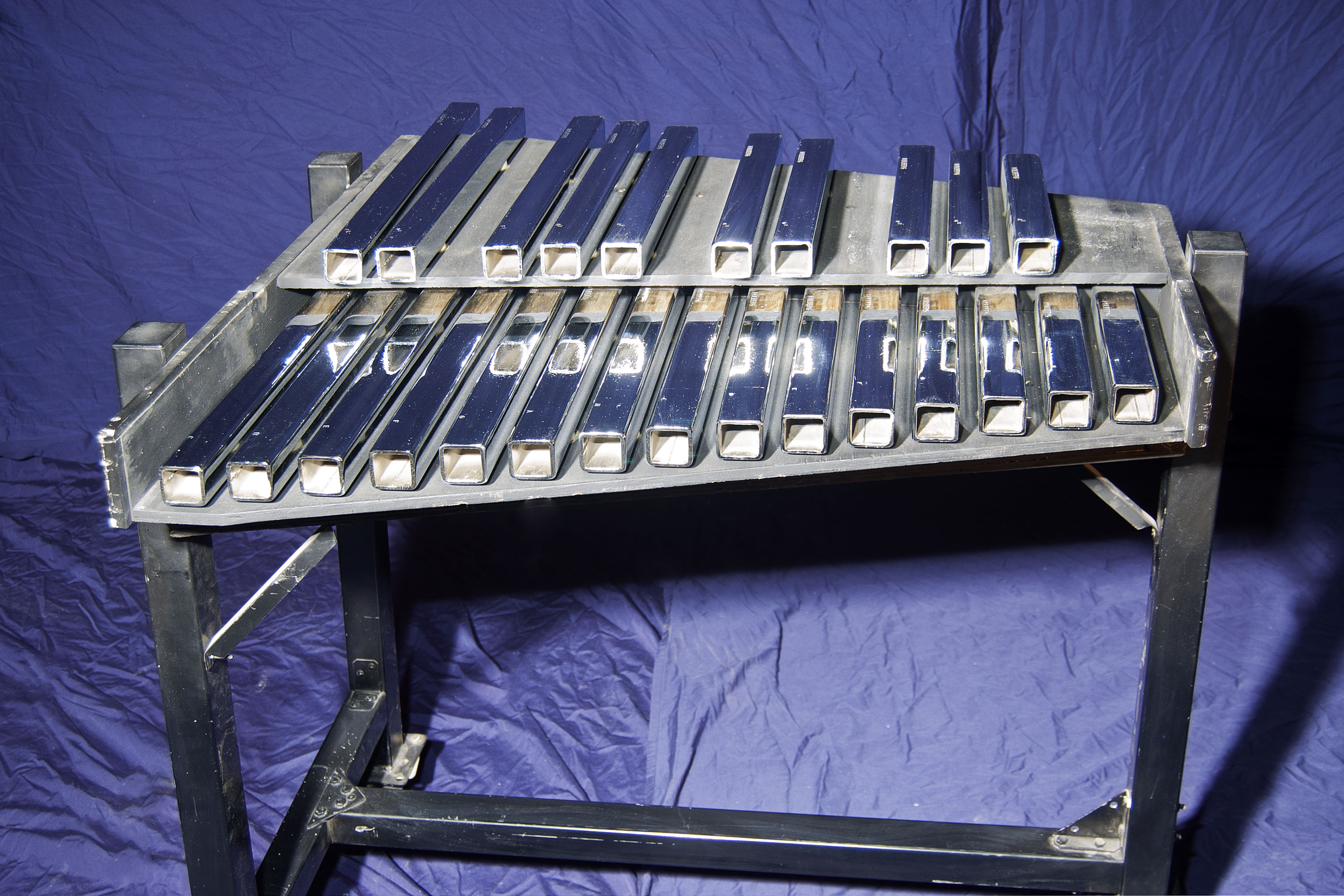
A chromatic set of tuned anvils

Anvils have been used as percussion instruments. The vast majority of extant works use the anvil as unpitched. However, tuned anvils are available as musical instruments, albeit unusual. These are not to be confused with the "sawyers' anvils" used to "tune" big circular saw blades. Steel anvils are used for tuning for use as musical instruments, because those based partly on cast iron and similar materials give a duller sound; this is actually valued in industry, as pure steel anvils are troublesomely noisy, though energetically more efficient. The hammer and anvil have enjoyed varying popularity in orchestral roles. Robert Donington pointed out that Sebastian Virdung notes them in his book of 1510, and Martin Agricola includes it in his list of instruments (Musica instrumentalis deudsch, 1529) largely as a compliment to Pythagoras. In pre-modern or modern times anvils occasionally appear in operatic works by Berlioz, Bizet, Gounod, Verdi, and Wagner for example. Commonly pairs of anvils tuned a third apart are used.

In practice modern orchestras commonly substitute a brake drum or other suitable steel structure that is easier to tune than an actual anvil, although a visibly convincing anvil-shaped prop may be shown as desired. In Das Rheingold Wagner scored for nine little, six mid-sized, and three large anvils, but orchestras seldom can afford instrumentation on such a scale.

== See also ==
- Anvil Chorus
- Diamond anvil cell
- Anvil cloud
