= List of Skidmore College people =

Here follows a list of some notable people associated with Skidmore College in Saratoga Springs, New York. It includes graduates, attendees, faculty, and presidents of the college.

== Distinguished alumni ==
=== Arts and entertainment ===
- Kristina Anapau, actor, True Blood (Class of 2009)
- Glenda Arentzen, goldsmith and jeweler (Class of 1962)
- Mary Jane Auch, writer and illustrator of children's books (Class of 1960)
- Nathan Barr, Emmy-winning film and TV composer and musician (Class of 1995)
- Zazie Beetz, actor, Deadpool 2 and Atlanta (Class of 2013)
- Lake Bell, actor, Boston Legal and Childrens Hospital (attended)
- Molly Bernard, actor, Younger (Class of 2010)
- Jon Bernthal, actor, The Walking Dead and The Wolf of Wall Street (attended)
- Lucinda Bliss, artist (Class of 1988)
- Diane Burko, artist focusing on climate change (Class of 1966)
- Eddie Cahill, actor, Miracle and CSI: NY (attended)
- Ruth Sacks Caplin, screenwriter of Mrs. Palfrey at the Claremont (Class of 1941)
- Kyle Carey, singer and musician (Class of 2008)
- Lyn Chevli, underground cartoonist (Class of 1953)
- Sharon Church, metalsmith artist and jeweler (Class of 1970)
- Kathleen Collins, playwright, filmmaker, director, civil rights activist, and educator, Losing Ground (Class of 1963)
- Gladys Emerson Cook, artist (Class of 1921)
- Michael Counts, stage director and designer of immersive theater events (Class of 1993)
- Kelly Curtis, actor (Class of 1978)
- Betsy Damon, ecofeminist artist (Class of 1963)
- Evan Dando, musician with The Lemonheads (attended)
- Grace DeGennaro, visual artist (Class of 1978)
- Dorothy Dehner, painter and sculptor (Class of 1952)
- Pete Donnelly, musician with The Figgs, NRBQ, Soul Asylum, and Mike Viola & the Candybutchers (Class of 2017)
- Garrett "G. Love" Dutton, musician with G. Love & Special Sauce (attended)
- Courtney Fink, arts organizer (Class of 1994)
- Arline Fisch, artist and professor (Class of 1952)
- Judith Flanders, author and historian (Class of 1980)
- Chris Fleming, comedian and creator of the web series Gayle (Class of 2009)
- Zaria Forman, artist (Class of 2005)
- Zach Gage, video game designer, SpellTower, Really Bad Chess, Card of Darkness, Puzzmo (Class of 2007)
- Anthony Geraci, blues pianist and member of both Sugar Ray & the Bluetones and Ronnie Earl & the Broadcasters
- Laura Anne Gilman, author of fantasy novels (Class of 1989)
- Tawny Godin, former Miss America 1976 (attended)
- Holter Graham, actor and producer (Class of 1994)
- Mick Grøndahl, bassist with Jeff Buckley
- Dorothy Hafner, ceramicist and glass artist (Class of 1974)
- Margaret Halsey, author, With Malice Toward Some (Class of 1930)
- Paula Hayes, environmental artist (class of 1987)
- Justin Henry, actor, Kramer vs. Kramer and Sixteen Candles (Class of 1993)
- John Hoberg, screenwriter and producer, Better Off Ted, Black-ish, Elemental (Class of 1993)
- Elizabeth Hoffman Honness, author of children's mystery novels (Class of 1926)
- Scott Jacoby, record producer (Class of 1993)
- Julia Jacquette, artist (Class of 1986)
- Sara Juli, dancer and choreographer (Class of 2000)
- Ian Kahn, actor, Turn: Washington's Spies (Class of 1994)
- Scott Hamilton Kennedy, documentarian (Class of 1987)
- Rya Kihlstedt, actor, Dexter, Nashville (Class of 1991)
- Grace Kuhlenschmidt, comedian, actor, and Daily Show correspondent (Class of 2017)
- Emily Lazar, audio mastering engineer (Class of 1993)
- Elizabeth LeCompte, co-founder and director of The Wooster Group; MacArthur Fellow (Class of 1966)
- Jardine Libaire, writer (Class of 1995)
- Sydney Magruder Washington, ballet dancer (Class of 2014)
- Lenore Malen, artist (Class of 1966)
- Evan Mast and Mike Stroud, musicians with Ratatat (Class of 2001)
- Courtney Mattison, sculptor and ocean advocate (Class of 2008)
- Molly McGrann, novelist and literary critic (Class of 1995)
- Will Menaker, political satirist and host of Chapo Trap House (Class of 2005)
- David Miner, television producer, 30 Rock, Parks and Recreation, and The Tracy Morgan Show (Class of 1991)
- Brad Morris, actor and writer (Class of 1998)
- Jack Mulhern, actor, The Society and Mare of Easttown (Class of 2017)
- Peter Nichols, author (Class of 2007)
- Michael Nozik, film producer, Crossing Delancey, The Motorcycle Diaries, and Quiz Show (Class of 1976)
- Nelle Nugent, Broadway producer, Time Stands Still (Class of 1960)
- Julia Nunes, singer, songwriter, YouTube celebrity (Class of 2011)
- Ashley Peldon, actor, Guiding Light, Ghost World (Class of 2007)
- Courtney Peldon, actor, Home Improvement, Boston Public (Class of 2007)
- Pat Place, no wave musician with Bush Tetras and the Contortions (attended)
- Mary Marr "Polly" Platt, producer, production designer, screenwriter (attended)
- Kim Poor, artist (Class of 1977)
- Jason Reitman, filmmaker, Juno, Up in the Air, Saturday Night (attended)
- Ariana Richards, actor and painter, Jurassic Park (Class of 2002)
- Jane Roberts, author and poet (attended)
- Gloria Sachs, fashion designer (Class of 1947)
- Sybil Shearer, modern dance pioneer and writer (Class of 1934)
- Jason Shinder, poet and founder of the YMCA National Writer's Voice program (Class of 1978)
- Caroline Slade, social worker and author of early "social problem" novels (attended pre-1911)
- Micah Sloat, actor, Paranormal Activity (Class of 2004)
- Jane Teller, printmaker and sculptor (attended 1929)
- Barbara Tfank, fashion designer (Class of 1972)
- Robert Tracy, dancer, writer, and educator (Class of 1977)
- Leslie Ullman, poet (Class of 1969)
- Joan Wadleigh Curran, artist (Class of 1972)
- Stanley Whitney, contemporary artist (attended)
- Matthew Wolff, graphic designer (Class of 2012)
- David Yoo, YA author and essayist (Class of 1996)
- Lila York, dancer and choreographer (Class of 1970)
- Michael Zegen, actor, Rescue Me, The Marvelous Mrs. Maisel (Class of 2001)

=== Athletics ===
- Matt Hyson, professional wrestler whose stage name is Spike Dudley (Class of 1992)
- Carlie Irsay-Gordon, co-owner of the Indianapolis Colts (Class of 2005)
- Abby Peck, Olympic rower (Class of 1978)

=== Business and philanthropy ===
- Molly Baz, chef and cookbook author, Cook This Book and More Is More (Class of 2010)
- Barbara Bloom, senior vice president of CBS Daytime
- Cynthia Carroll, CEO of Anglo American, ranked 14th most powerful woman in the world by Forbes in 2010 (Class of 1978)
- Ben Cohen, co-founder of Ben & Jerry's Ice Cream (attended)
- Helen Corbitt, chef and cookbook author (Class of 1928)
- Louise Fili, graphic designer (Class of 1973)
- Thea Flaum, television producer best known as the creator of Sneak Previews (Class of 1960)
- Oskar Ibru, business magnate, Chairman of the Ibru Organization (class of 1981)
- Robin Bennett Kanarek, nurse, philanthropist, and author
- Jono Pandolfi, ceramicist and dinnerware designer (Class of 1999)
- Rob Sands, executive chair of Constellation Brands (Class of 1981)
- Joseph Tacopina, attorney (Class of 1988)
- Wilma Stein Tisch, board member and philanthropist (Class of 1948)

=== Academia and science ===
- I. Elaine Allen, survey statistician and biostatistician (Class of 1970)
- Wendy Benchley, marine conservationist (Class of 1963)
- Benjamin Bolger, sociology professor at the College of William & Mary (MA 2007)
- Leah Buechley, developer of the LilyPad Arduino toolkit for wearable electronics (Class of 1997)
- Sallie W. Chisholm, biological oceanographer at the Massachusetts Institute of Technology (Class of 1969)
- Céline Cousteau, environmental advocate and documentarian (Class of 1994)
- Daniel DiSalvo, political science professor (Class of 1998)
- Karen Flaherty-Oxler, rear admiral, former deputy surgeon general of Navy Medicine (Class of 1974)
- Terry Fulmer, geriatrics researcher and president of The John A. Hartford Foundation (Class of 1976)
- Patricia Glibert, marine scientist and president of the Association for the Sciences of Limnology and Oceanography (Class of 1974)
- Ruby Puryear Hearn, biophysicist and senior vice president emerita of the Robert Wood Johnson Foundation (Class of 1960)
- Heather Hurst, archaeologist, MacArthur Fellow (Class of 1997)
- Fillia Makedon, computer scientist (Class of 1968)
- Jens David Ohlin, dean of Cornell Law School (Class of 1996)
- Hazel Stiebeling, nutritionist and early developer of "daily allowance" guidelines (Class of 1915)
- Amy Townsend-Small, director of the Environmental Studies Program at the University of Cincinnati (Class of 1998)
- Jessica Wahman, Emory University philosophy professor and author (Class of 1990)

=== Journalism ===
- Lise Bang-Jensen, journalist (Inside Albany) and New York policy analyst (Class of 1971)
- Arwa Damon, Middle East correspondent for CNN (Class of 1999)
- Cassandra Giraldo, photojournalist and documentarian (Class of 2011)
- Jane Gross, sportswriter, New York Times journalist, and author (Class of 1969)
- Juleyka Lantigua, journalist (The Atlantic, NPR) and podcast producer (Class of 1996)
- Grace Mirabella, author and former editor-in-chief of Vogue (Class of 1950)
- Cal Perry, correspondent for CNN based in the network's Beirut bureau (Class of 2001)
- Webster Tarpley, author, historian, conspiracy theorist (MA)

=== Politics and public affairs ===
- Nikki Beare, political and social activist, inductee to Florida Women's Hall of Fame (Class of 1980)
- Joseph Bruno, senator, New York State Senate majority leader (also received an honorary doctorate) (Class of 1952)
- Jennie Cave, first female mayor of Norwalk, Connecticut (Class of 1923)
- Katsi Cook, Native American rights' activist, environmentalist, and women's health advocate (attended)
- Josh S. Cutler, Massachusetts politician (Class of 1994)
- Susan M. Elliott, diplomat and president of The National Committee on American Foreign Policy (Class of 1974)
- Sallie Fellows, New Hampshire politician (Class of 1974)
- J. Christopher Giancarlo, chair of the Commodity Futures Trading Commission (Class of 1981)
- Fred Guttenberg, gun-control activist (Class of 1988)
- Maxine Isaacs, political analyst (Class of 1969)
- Joseph Ben Kaifala, Sierra Leonean human rights activist (Class of 2008)
- Morris Katz, political adviser to Zohran Mamdani (Matriculated in 2017 but failed to complete his degree)
- Carolyn Konheim, environmental activist and cofounder of Citizens for Clean Air (Class of 1959)
- Maritza Rivera, Seattle city councilmember (Class of 1991)
- Helene Schneider, former mayor of Santa Barbara, California (Class of 1992)
- Kate Snyder, mayor of Portland, Maine (Class of 1992)
- Eleanor Weinstock, Florida politician (Class of 1950)
- Anne Wexler, political advisor and lobbyist (Class of 1951)
- Melissa Winter, chief of staff and senior advisor to Michelle Obama (Class of 1989)

== Notable faculty ==
- Yacub Addy, Ghanaian drum master and composer
- April Bernard, English professor
- Robert Boyers, English professor and editor of literary journal Salmagundi
- Regis Brodie, art professor
- Greg Hrbek, English professor
- Heather Hurst, archaeologist, anthropology professor, and MacArthur Fellow
- Evan Mack, music professor
- Steven Millhauser, Pulitzer Prize-winning novelist
- Daniel A. Nathan, American studies professor
- R. Parthasarathy, poet
- Pushkala Prasad, management professor
- Minita Sanghvi, business professor, author, and politician
- Linda Simon, English professor
- Sheldon Solomon, psychology professor
- Kathryn H. Starbuck, executive secretary and law professor
- Everett Stonequist, sociologist

== Presidents of the college ==
- Charles Henry Keyes (1912–1925)
- Henry T. Moore (1925–1957)
- Val H. Wilson (1957–1964)
- Josephine Young Case (1964–1965; interim position)
- Joseph C. Palamountain, Jr. (1965–1987)
- David H. Porter (1987–1999)
- Jamienne S. Studley (1999–2003)
- Philip A. Glotzbach (2003–2020)
- Marc C. Conner (2020–present)
