= Daniel Nathan =

Daniel Nathan may refer to:

- Daniel A. Nathan, American scholar of cultural studies
- Daniel O. Nathan, American philosopher
- Daniel Nathan, birth name of one of the two authors who wrote under the joint pseudonym Ellery Queen
