= Pushkala Prasad =

Indian-American academic, researcher and writer

- Born: India
- Spouse: Anshuman Prasad

Academic background
- Doctoral advisor: Judith Birdsell; Timothy Hynes; Charlotte Echtner; Jeffrey Everett; Ralph Meima

Academic work
- Notable works: Crafting Qualitative Research: Working in the Post-Positivist Traditions

Pushkala Prasad is an Indian American academic, researcher and writer. She is the Zankel Chair Professor of Management and Liberal Arts at Skidmore College. She is best known for her book Crafting Qualitative Research: Working in the Post-Positivist Traditions and her research on workplace diversity. A great deal of her work is done in collaboration with her late husband, Anshuman Prasad.

Prasad has developed research focusing on global racial capitalism, organizational diversity, and workplace resistance to technological change. She has written extensively on the problematic nature of interpretative methods and ethnographic knowledge production, and has developed the notion of research tradition as a more meaningful alternative to that of paradigm in the social sciences.

== Education ==
Prasad was born and raised in India. She received her B.A. in history and political science from the University of Madras. Subsequently, she received her MBA from the Xavier Institute. In 1985, she moved to the United States, where she studied for Ph.D. in management at the University of Massachusetts Amherst. While she was doing her Ph.D, Prasad began working as an assistant professor at Clarkson University. Prasad completed her Ph.D. in 1992.

== Career ==
In 1993, Prasad moved to Canada, where she became an associate professor at the University of Calgary. Alongside her work at University of Calgary, she worked as a visiting scholar at Helsinki School of Economics and the Sloan School of Management as a visiting scholar.

In 1998, Prasad left University of Calgary and joined Lund University in Sweden as the Chair Professor in Public Administration. In 2000, she moved back to the US, where she became the Zankel Chair Professor at Skidmore College. The same year, she became a Visiting Chair Professor in Corporate Social Responsibility at Lund University.

=== Research and writing ===
Prasad’s early work focused on the symbolism of computer technology and the complex nature of employee resistance to it. Her interest in the wider phenomenological tradition can be seen in her writings on ethnography where she explores the emergence of the idea of “the native” and “native ways of knowing” from the colonial project to produce knowledge about “the other.”

Prasad has also conducted considerable research on the topic of workplace diversity. In 1997 she co-edited a collection of essays that looked at the darker side of diversity dynamics in the workplace in a book called Managing the Organizational Melting Pot: Dilemmas of Workplace Diversity, and in 2006 she co-edited The Handbook of Workplace Diversity with Alison Konrad and Judith Pringle. Her more recent research on workplace diversity shows the influence of institutional theory as well as postcolonial theory. Her work looks at clashes around identity formation in organizations, and various institutional pressures on the process of managing diversity.

She is best known for her discussions of various qualitative methodological traditions in Crafting Qualitative Traditions, a book that examines multiple qualitative genres including hermeneutics, ethnography, critical theory, feminism and post structuralism. The book makes fine-grained distinctions both within and between major qualitative traditions such as interpretivism, critical scholarship and various post-genres. It also offers a map of current research taking place within these different traditions.

Prasad has also done research in the sub-field of Critical Management Studies in Organizational Studies. She has interrogated some self-proclaimed pioneers within critical management studies for their relative indifference to the dynamics of race, gender, religion and nationality within the world of organizations, and for their self-inflicted ignorance about the world outside the Western business academy. These critiques have been more fully elaborated in the Routledge Companion to Critical Management Studies, which she has co-edited with Anshuman Prasad, Albert Mills and Jean Helms Mills.

Her most recent book, titled Capitalism’s Dark Complexion: Race, Markets and the Politics of Value, was published in 2026.

== Awards and honors ==
- Best Experiential Paper Award, Eastern Academy of Management, 1992
- Outstanding New Teacher Award, Clarkson University, 1993
- Outstanding New Scholar Award, University of Calgary, 1995
- Ascendent Scholar Award, Western Academy of Management, U.S.A., 1997
- Outstanding Research Award, Faculty of Management, University of Calgary, 1998
- Emerald Management Reviews Award for Outstanding Empirical Paper, 2004
- Edwin Moseley Lectureship, 2017

== Publications ==
=== Books ===
- Managing the Organizational Melting Pot: Dilemmas of Workplace Diversity. Co-edited with A. Mills, M.B. Elmes & A. Prasad. 1997. Thousand Oaks, CA: Sage Publications.
- Crafting Qualitative Research: Working in the Post-Positivist Traditions. Armonk, NY: M.E. Sharpe, 2005.
- Handbook of Workplace Diversity. Co-edited with Alison Konrad & Judith Pringle, 2006, London: Sage Publications.
- Routledge Companion to Critical Management Studies (CMS).Co-edited with Anshuman Prasad, Albert Mills & Jean Helms Mills, London: Routledge, 2015.
- Capitalism’s Dark Complexion: Race, Markets and the Politics of Value. Bristol, UK: Bristol University Press, 2026.

=== Select chapters ===
- The Protestant Ethic and Myths of the Frontier: Cultural Imprints, Organizational Structuring and Workplace Diversity. In P. Prasad et al. (Eds.) 1997, Managing the Organizational Melting Pot: Dilemmas of Workplace Diversity. Thousand Oaks, CA: Sage Publications.
- Otherness at Large: Identity and Difference in the New Globalized Organizational Landscape (with Anshuman Prasad). In A. Mills & I. Marjosla (Eds.) 2002, Gender, Identity and the Culture of Organizations. London: Routledge.
- Casting the Native Subject: Ethnographic Practice and the (Re)Production of Difference (with Anshuman Prasad). In B. Czarniawska & H. Hopfl (Eds.) 2002, Casting the Other: The Production and Maintenance of Inequality in Organizations. London: Routledge.
- Endless Crossroads Debates, Disagreements and Deliberations on Organizational Culture (with Anshuman Prasad) In A. Bryman and D. Buchanan (Eds.) 2009, Handbook of Organization Research Methods. London: Sage Publications.
- Unveiling Europe’s Civilized Face: Gender Identities, New Immigrants and the Discourse of the Veil in the Scandinavian Workplace. In A. Prasad (Ed.) 2012. Against the Grain: Advances in Postcolonial Organization Studies. Copenhagen: Lieber.

=== Select papers ===
- Patterns of Mock Bureaucracy in Mining Disasters: An Analysis of the Westray Mine Explosion (with Timothy Hynes), Journal of Management Studies, 1997, vol.34, 601-623.
- Everyday Struggles at the Workplace: The Nature and Implications of Routine Resistance (with Anshuman Prasad). Research in the Sociology of Organizations, 1998, vol.15, 225-257.
- Stretching the Iron Cage: The Constitution and Implications of Routine Workplace Resistance (with Anshuman Prasad). Organization Science, 2000, vol.11, 387-403.
- The Context of Third World Tourism Marketing (with Charlotte Echtner), Annals of Tourism Research, 2003, vol.30: 660-682.
- In the Name of the Practical: Unearthing the Hegemony of Pragmatism in the Discourse of Environmental Management (with Michael Elmes). Journal of Management Studies, 2005, vol. 42:845-867.
- “One Mirror in Another”: Managing Diversity and the Discourse of Fashion (with Anshuman Prasad & Raza Mir). Human Relations, 2012, 64: 703 – 724.
