= Caroline Slade =

American activist and author

Caroline Jennings Slade
- Born: Caroline Jennings Beach; October 7, 1886; Minneapolis, Minnesota
- Died: June 25, 1975 (aged 88); Saratoga Springs, New York
- Writing career
- Years active: 1920s-1940s
- Notable works: The Triumph of Willie Pond, Lilly Crackell, Margaret

Cover of Caroline Slade's Lilly Crackell (Signet Books, 1950)

Caroline Jennings Slade (October 7, 1886 — June 25, 1975; born Caroline Jennings Beach) was a New York State social welfare worker, child and women’s rights activist, and author of six starkly realistic novels that depicted poverty, misfortune, and social injustice within the lower stratum of American society during the Great Depression.

Slade’s books have been described as perfecting the social problem novel and are often categorized as Depression Era Literature. Her best known works include The Triumph of Willie Pond (1940), Lilly Crackell (1943), and Margaret (1946).

== Early years ==
Slade was born Caroline Jennings Beach on October 7, 1886, in Minneapolis, Minnesota, to Gertrude Lee Pease and accountant John Hartwell Beach. When she was seven, her family moved to Saratoga Springs, New York. Her father then entered government service and around the year 1900 moved to the Philippines, leaving Caroline and her younger brother John Lee with relatives in Saratoga Springs.

In the early 1900s, Beach attended Skidmore College. During this time she met her future husband John Albert Slade (b. April 14, 1882), a lawyer and Skidmore lecturer. They married October 27, 1906.

Soon thereafter Slade took employment as a Saratoga County social welfare worker, a position she held for many years. During her career, she helped organize the Saratoga County Board of Child Welfare and was its first executive director. She also served as an advisor to the Saratoga Children’s Court, doing probation and social work.

== Writing career ==
Slade shifted her focus from active social work to writing after she retired from welfare work in 1933. At that time, she had written stories and articles for national publications. In 1929, she was honored with an O. Henry Award for her short story “Mrs. Sabin,” which appeared in the publication Plain Talk.

Book jacket cover of Sterile Sun (1938)

In 1936, when Slade was 50, her first book Sterile Sun was published. The nature of the main storyline—an account of a “wayward girl” who slips into prostitution—compelled the publisher Vanguard Press to print a disclaimer on the dust jacket: “STERILE SUN is issued in a special edition, the sale of which is limited to physicians, psychiatrists, sociologists, social workers, educators and other persons having a professional interest in the problems of adolescence.”

Slade’s next book, The Triumph of Willie Pond, published in 1940, tells of the poverty and misfortune of a lower-class family and the struggles of its principal breadwinner, the titular Willie Pond. It has been described as “an intensely moving book” and “an unforgiving attack on the irrationalities and injustices of existing social welfare policies.”

A year later, Job’s House (1941) was published: an account of a poor but earnest old couple who have lived by the rules, but now misfortune is forcing them to turn to public assistance and the prospect of losing their long-time home.

In 1943, the novel Lilly Crackell appeared. The book recounts 20 years in the life of the titular character, a welfare mother, from the age of 14 when she finds herself a mother-to-be to her later years of adversity and fading hope, with six children in tow, and how social welfare officials, some inept and corrupt, come and go, oftentimes more interested in preserving their jobs and good names than in truly helping. A review noted that Lilly Crackell “will touch off many a hot debate about the duty of society to see to it that every child has a chance. But it will be read for the powerful and compassionate work of art that it is.” Literary critic Diana Trilling deemed the book “most estimable,” a “social-work novel, despite the fact that it is unsparing in its criticism of that profession.”

Slade’s fifth book, the novel Margaret (1946), returned to the sensitive theme held close by the author: prostitution and the social forces behind it. In the novel, impoverishment, a deteriorating family life, and hunger for better things, lure a young tenement girl toward delinquency and tragedy.

Mrs. Party’s House, Slade’s final book, was released in 1948. Here, the theme of prostitution is again central to the story, this time from the perspective of a “madam” who, earlier in life, penniless and facing the perilous decision of putting her beloved paralyzed mother in a home, decides to take a different course of action. A New York Times review characterized the book as a “minutely documented study of the good and bad of commercialized vice,” while pointing out “there is no doubting the sincerity or [its] serious purpose.”

== Audience and critical reception ==
Slade’s books were modestly popular and, for the most part, sold well, but not well enough to receive further printings in hardcover. In the early 1950s, her best selling works—The Triumph of Willie Pond, Lilly Crackell, and Margaret—garnered additional exposure when they were re-issued in paperback by Signet Books with colorful, suggestive cover art.

The critical reception to Slade’s novels was mixed. Some critics valued the realism and informative aspects of her novels, while others complained about the flat characterizations and of a tenor toward case history presentation. Slade’s work has been summarized as “notable less for its literary merit than for its sensitive and realistic treatment of unusual subject matter.” At the same time, however, the quality of her writing and use of irony was judged high enough to raise her novels above the level of sociological tracts.

While Slade’s first book Sterile Sun was generally well received for its realistic tone—author James T. Farrell proclaimed the novel “an important social document and a moving piece of writing”—it was her second book, The Triumph of Willie Pond, that drew the critical attention of the major newspapers and journals. The New York Times in a lengthy review of the novel had this to say:

With realism so stark, it becomes almost unbearable. Mrs. Slade describes the starvation, the filth, the fear, the disintegration of character of the huddled humans who were once a family. But she makes it clear that fundamentally they are sound and sweet.

The Times review continued:

To a great degree [Mrs. Slade’s] knowledge and the detail with which she describes the disintegration of an American family mar the creative pattern of her novel. But most convincingly they add to the questions she pounds home to devastating effect. Is a sick man and his family more valuable to a community than a healthy man? Can $2,000 a year or more be spent on a man with tuberculosis and half of that be denied him when he is cured? And realizing that, what can a man like Willie Pond, ashamed of taking relief, ashamed of not being able to give his family a proper home and food and clothing, aware that there are no jobs to be had, what can Willie Pond do?

In a review of Job’s House, James T. Farrell, writing in the Saturday Review of Literature, praised the novel for presenting a world that is "human-all-too human," adding that the "sectors of life which she describes at times make even Tobacco Road seem like a country club." Another reviewer was impressed with the skill Slade showed in taking cases of the underprivileged from the filing cabinets and giving them life in the novel.

Lilly Crackell, reviewed in the New York Times, was described as a book that has “taken the lid off a world that is unknown to most of us” and one that “manages to hold the reader’s interest all the way.”

Other reviews were less generous. In the Times review of Margaret, the book was reported to be like a case history recorded by a social worker with a dash of fictional devices. It noted the main character has a three-dimensional quality, but the others were mere cardboard personages, lacking originality.

== Bibliography ==
=== Books ===
- Sterile Sun (New York: The Vanguard Press, 1936) (New York: Macauley Company, 1936)
- The Triumph of Willie Pond (New York: The Vanguard Press, 1940) (Signet Books, 1951, #895)
- Job’s House (New York: The Vanguard Press, 1941)
- Lilly Crackell (New York: The Vanguard Press, 1943) (Cleveland and New York: The World Publishing Company, 1945) (Signet Books, 1950, #829; reprinted 1952)
- Margaret (New York: The Vanguard Press, 1946) (Signet Books, 1950, #769; reprinted 1956 and 1964)
- Mrs. Party’s House (New York: The Vanguard Press, 1948)

=== Articles ===
- "From the Log of a Social Worker" The Survey, August 15, 1928, p. 501.
- "Ex Sua Natura" The Survey, October 1, 1928, pp. 24–28.
- "Mrs. Sabin" Plain Talk, June 1929
- "House in Saratoga" The New Yorker, July 29, 1935
- "These Shall Survive" The New Masses, July 21, 1936, p. 16.
- "Mrs. Flibbity's Case History" The New Republic, December 8, 1937, p. 127.
- "Mrs. Flaherty, Social Worker" The New Yorker, December 11, 1937
- "Cure in Saratoga" The New Yorker, July 13, 1940
- "Mrs. Flibbity Takes Charge" The Survey, September 1, 1940, pp. 261–262.

== Other endeavors ==
Slade was active in the women’s rights movement throughout her adult life, serving for a period as a regional director in the National League of Women Voters. She and her husband, John, were significantly involved in the arts scene in Saratoga Springs, particularly Yaddo, the writers’ retreat. Caroline had been a Yaddo resident, and John, for many years, was chair of Yaddo’s Board of Directors and had served as interim executive director for a period. Due to his many decades of community service in Saratoga Springs, John Slade was often referred to as “Mr. Saratoga.”

== Death and legacy ==
Slade died June 25, 1975, in Saratoga Springs, New York. She was 88. John Albert Slade, her husband, had preceded her in death, dying December 25, 1969. They had no children.

With the exception of Margaret, which received a paperback reprinting in 1964, Slade’s novels have been out of print since the 1950s. Although copies of her books are easily found online, Slade is now considered a neglected author whose body of work is largely unknown to the reading public. Due to the nature of her novels and their Depression Era case-history realism, academic scholars have taken note and her work has been frequently referenced in recent years in studies pertaining to American labor and women’s history.
