= Jono Pandolfi =

American ceramic artist and designer (born 1976)

Jono Pandolfi (born 1976) is an American ceramic artist and designer. He is a product designer and visiting critic at the Parsons School of Design.

== Career ==
After studying under Regis Brodie at Skidmore College, Pandolfi taught pottery at the Millbrook School before moving to New York City to design jewelry and manage the ceramics studio at Penn South. His custom tabletop ceramic pieces are featured in prominent New York City restaurants, including Terrace 5, Cafe 2 at the Museum of Modern Art, chef Daniel Humm's Eleven Madison Park, The Core Club, The Musket Room and Clio. Additionally, he designed a line of dinnerware, "Kona" for Crate & Barrel.
