= John J. Stuhr =

American philosopher (born 1951)

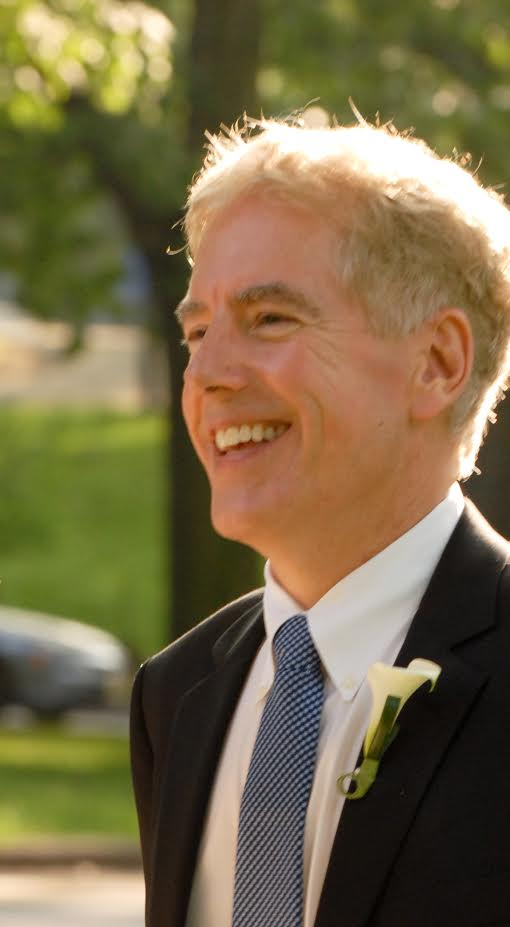
- Born: John Jeremy Stuhr; November 28, 1951 (age 74)
- Spouse: Jessica Wahman (m. 2012)

Education
- Education: Carleton College (BA); Vanderbilt University (MA, PhD)

Philosophical work
- Era: Contemporary philosophy
- Region: Western philosophy
- School: Pragmatism
- Main interests: Social and Political Philosophy, Ethics
- Notable ideas: Genealogical pragmatism

John Jeremy Stuhr (born November 28, 1951) is an American philosopher who teaches at Emory University. He has written extensively about a wide assortment of philosophical figures and movements as well as a broad array of cultural problems and issues. His work is known for its lively, engaged, and direct style. He draws critically on thinkers from often separated philosophical traditions (such as Pragmatism, Neopragmatism, Continental Philosophy, Critical Theory, Postmodernism, and Deconstruction). Revealing his impatience with narrow and academic conceptions of philosophy, his writings make deep and consistent use of poetry, painting, photography, and the lyrics of contemporary music, and they exhibit a broad interdisciplinary reach across fields such as rhetoric, media studies, relativity theory, political and legal theory, cultural geography, and economics.

== Early life ==
Stuhr's mother was a philosophy professor who left the academy for politics and public service. His father, an aspiring poet, left the humanities and arts after World War II to become a founding partner in the country's first consulting firm to provide strategic planning for colleges and universities. He also served as Executive Director of the Economic Club of Chicago. Growing up in the Chicago area and surrounded at home by philosophy and poetry and liberal politics, Stuhr attended New Trier High School. He then earned his B.A. in philosophy from Carleton College, studying with philosophers Roy Elveton, Gary Iseminger, Maury Landsman, and Perry Mason, classics scholar David H. Porter, and economist Robert E. Will. Abandoning at the last moment his plans for law school, in less than three years he earned both an M.A. and Ph.D. in philosophy from Vanderbilt University, where he studied with John J. Compton, Michael Hodges, Charles E. Scott, and Robert C. Williams. Under the direction of John Lachs, he wrote a dissertation, Experience as Activity: Dewey’s Metaphysics, focused on pragmatism and its historical roots in the thought of Aristotle and Hegel.

== Career ==
Stuhr began his teaching career at the age of 24. After a year as a tenure-track Assistant Professor of Philosophy at the University of New England, he taught for a decade as assistant professor, associate professor, and full professor at Whitman College. He moved to the University of Oregon to become a professor of philosophy and the founding director of the Oregon Humanities Center. In 1994 he accepted appointment as head of the department of philosophy at Penn State University (and its more than 20 campuses) where he also was Distinguished Professor of Philosophy and American Studies. In 2003 he moved back to Vanderbilt University to become W. Alton Jones Professor of Philosophy and American Studies. In 2008, having chaired an external review of the department two years earlier, he accepted Emory University's offer to become Chair of the department of philosophy (2008–2016) and Arts and Sciences Distinguished Professor of Philosophy and American Studies.

Throughout his university administrative work, Stuhr has evidenced strong commitment to philosophical pluralism and institutional diversity, a push for growth and an advocacy for philosophy and the humanities, and a determination to make strong faculty appointments and to provide the intellectual space for them to do high-quality work. At Whitman College, for example, during Stuhr's leadership the philosophy department doubled in size and added the first women and first African-American philosophers in the institution's history. At the University of Oregon, the Humanities Center grew rapidly (fueled by major private fundraising) and engaged a highly diverse group of scholars on campus and intellectual leaders across the state. During his headship at Penn State, the department hired a large group of philosophers including John Sallis (now at Boston College), John Russon (now at the University of Guelph), Richard A. Lee, Jr. (now at DePaul University), Shannon Sullivan (now at the University of North Carolina, Charlotte), Dennis J. Schmidt (now at Western Sydney University), and Nancy Tuana and Vincent Colapietro. And, at Emory, under Stuhr's watch overhauls of both the undergraduate and graduate programs greatly increased diversity and pluralistic approaches to philosophy, as did appointments of new faculty including John T. Lysaker, Marta Jimenez, Melvin Rogers (now at Brown University), Susan M. Bredlau, Dilek Huseyinzadegan, and George Dewey Yancy.

Stuhr has also held many lead administrative positions within the discipline of philosophy and, more broadly, the humanities. These include: president (1981), Northwest Philosophy Conference; director (1990–93), Western Humanities Conference; founding fellow (1987–2001), Society of Philosophers in America; president (2004–2006) and executive council (1982-1985, 2002–2008), Society for the Advancement of American Philosophy; vice-president and president elect (2023–24) and president (2024-24), Metaphysical Society of America; and, founding director (2007--), American Philosophies Forum. At present he is also the editor of the quarterly Journal of Speculative Philosophy (the oldest philosophy journal in the USA without religious affiliation) and the founding American Philosophy book series general editor at Indiana University Press.

Stuhr has held several visiting appointments and fellowships, including: a Fulbright Fellowship at Germany's Freiburg University (Albert-Ludwigs-Universität Freiburg); a visiting faculty position at Australia's University of Melbourne; a visiting research fellowship at Saint Petersburg State University (Санкт-Петербургский государственный университет, СПбГУ); and, three times, a visiting scholar position at Cornell University to complete book projects. In 2023, Carleton College presented Stuhr with a lifetime Distinguished Achievement Award.

Stuhr has authored over 200 scholarly articles, book chapters, and editorials. He is also the author or editor of several books. His work has been supported by many other institutions, agencies, grants and awards, including: the American Philosophical Society, the Carnegie Council on Ethics and International Affairs, the Shelby Cullom Davis Foundation, the Mellon Foundation, the National Endowment for the Humanities, the Oregon Council for the Humanities, the Center on Philanthropy at Indiana University, and Emory University's Institute for the History of Philosophy.

Stuhr has received several teaching awards. His graduate students and undergraduate students (more than two dozen of whom have received Ph.D.s in philosophy) include: professors and educators Rachel Dresbeck, Jeff Edmonds, Mark Fagiano, Tom Hilde, William S. Lewis, Michael Sullivan (now an Emory colleague), and Jamie Ross; business leaders and attorneys Sarah Bowers, Stephanie Dorgan, Wes Felix, Terrence R. McInnis, Brian Rabinovitz, Jibran Shermohammed, and Peter Viehl; and musicians and artists Marcus Amerman, C.J. Boyd, Chris Eckman, Charlie Humphrey, Max Levenson, Linda Lyons, and Deanne Meek. Through Dorgan (who owned Seattle's Crocodile Café), Stuhr met REM guitarist Peter Buck, and he, with members of REM and U2 singer Bono, served as character witnesses at Buck's “air rage” trial in London in 2002. Stuhr also appeared in the National Public Television mini-series documentary, “A Parliament of Minds.” In addition to his career in higher education, Stuhr also has worked as an editorial writer for the Portland Oregonian (under the direction of Robert M. Landauer) and as a political consultant on health and educational policy.

== Philosophical themes ==
=== Genealogical pragmatism ===
The newest version of pragmatism included in American Philosophy: An Encyclopedia, Stuhr's genealogical pragmatism, a break from most traditional philosophy, draws on the work of 19th and 20th century American and European thinkers—particularly John Dewey's account of philosophy's “genetic method” and Foucault's genealogy—to develop a multiperspectival, fallible, always uncertain and unfinished, and irreducibly normative philosophy that is both critical and reconstructive in intent and effect. Stuhr argues that this philosophy is both instrumental—a criticism of the present on behalf of possibilities inherent in the present—and genealogical—a history of the present on behalf of future possibilities that are not inherent or imagined in the present. Stuhr stresses that this pragmatism does not even attempt to solve the problems of traditional philosophies: “Instead, studying both their ends and the means by which they have cloaked these ends in their self-proclaimed problems, methods, and systems, it localizes and abandons these philosophies.” In this context, Stuhr examines the spread of a business or corporate approach to education and critical thought that marginalizes critical thought, develops a relational account of temporal experience and a relational, radical empiricist, relativistic account of values, and formulates a critical community politics that he applies to issues of economic inequality, higher education, and the disillusioned recognition of unreconstructed personal death.

=== Pragmatism and postmodernism ===
In a key chapter in Genealogical Pragmatism, “The Idols of the Twilight: Pragmatism and Postmodernism,” Stuhr shows how many pragmatists and many postmodernists are “children of Emerson” and, beginning with James and Nietzsche, he carefully charts their similarities and their differences. Stressing the reality of time and change, in Pragmatism, Postmodernism, and the Future of Philosophy, Stuhr focuses on the ways in which these philosophical traditions present us with a Herculean labor to think and live differently in the future. In particular, Stuhr suggests that the work of writers such as Deleuze, Adorno, and Foucault are crucial resources for pragmatist thinkers who find in earlier pragmatism “an account of inquiry insufficiently attuned to issues of power, struggle, and multiplicity; a radically democratic ideal in need of response to threats from new technologies and the defects of liberal governments and societies; a pluralism in tension with pragmatism’s understanding of its own values, methods, and future, and a view of philosophy as criticism that needs to become more critically self-reflective about its own history and effects, and about challenges to its very existence in possible post-critical societies.” Stuhr's vision here is thoroughly democratic—he spells out a notion of democracy as a way of life (and one in the face of terrorism)—and thoroughly this-worldly—he concludes with “no consolation” by providing an account of ‘life without spirituality” and “philosophy without transcendence.”

=== Philosophies as fashions, philosophy as expressivist ===
In Pragmatism, Postmodernism, and the Future of Philosophy, Stuhr characterized his genealogical pragmatism as a “critically pluralistic way of thinking” and “a way of living of great, ordinary love and sadness.” And he noted that philosophy is less a matter of argument and proof than of suggestion and evocation. These two themes—pluralism (across politics, morals, epistemologies, and ontologies) and philosophy as personal vision and creative, evocative art—are developed thoroughly in Pragmatic Fashions: Pluralism, Democracy, Relativism, and the Absurd. This book advances in part through a large number of paintings and the author's photographs and poems, suggests that different philosophies be understood as different and multiple personal visions of the world—just as we might see differences in the music of Beethoven and Beyoncé, the paintings of El Greco and Monet, or the writings of Jane Austen and James Baldwin. Stuhr writes that this expressivist view of philosophy “is intimately attuned to key sensibilities of pragmatism—attuned to a deep fallibilism and experimentalism, pluralism and a thoroughgoing temporalism, a radically empirical relationalism or relativism, a commitment to methods of experimental intelligence and democratic practice, and an orientation to this world and the finitude of human life.” Stuhr shows how this view illuminates philosophical disagreements in accounts of reality, knowledge, values, and political issues such as democracy, terrorism, and war. After setting forth an “absurd pragmatism” that draws as much or more on Camus than on James—Stuhr calls Sisyphysus “a pragmatist hero”--, he sets forth a deeply personal, lyrical view of life that acknowledges both human finitude and human passion.

Stuhr also describes pragmatism as "a season of belief," a temporal philosophy. Given its melioristic core, he argues that pragmatism gives us a dynamic way by which we can improve our communities and personal lives a little bit more each day.

== Personal life ==
Stuhr has two adult children and is married to Jessica T. Wahman, a philosophy professor, the author of Narrative Naturalism: An Alternative Framework for Philosophy of Mind, and co-editor (with Stuhr and José M. Medina) of Cosmopolitanism and Place.

== Works ==
- Cosmopolitanism and Place, ed. Jessica T. Wahman, Jose M. Medina, and John J. Stuhr (Bloomington, IN: Indiana University Press, 2017).
- Pragmatic Fashions: Pluralism, Democracy, Relativism, and the Absurd (Bloomington, IN: Indiana University Press, 2016).
- 100 Years of Pragmatism: William James’s Revolutionary Philosophy, ed. (Indiana University Press, 2010).
- Pragmatism, Postmodernism, and the Future of Philosophy (New York and London: Routledge, 2003).
- Pragmatism and Classical American Philosophy: Essential Readings & Interpretive Essays, ed. (New York: Oxford University Press, 2000).
- Genealogical Pragmatism: Philosophy, Experience, and Community (Albany: State University of New York Press, 1997).
- Philosophy and the Reconstruction of Culture: Pragmatic Essays After Dewey, ed. (Albany: State University of New York Press, 1993)
- Ethics and Free Enterprise: The Social Responsibility of Business, ed. with Robin Cochran (Eugene: University of Oregon Press, 1991).
- John Dewey (Nashville: Carmichael & Carmichael, 1991; study guide, 1993; CD audio, 1991; New York: Blackstone, DVD audio, 2006).
- Morals and the Media: Information, Entertainment, and Manipulation, ed. with Robin Cochran (Eugene: University of Oregon Press, 1990).
- Public Morals and Private Interest: Ethics in Government and Public Service, ed. with Robin Cochran (Eugene: University of Oregon Press, 1989).
- Classical American Philosophy: Essential Readings and Interpretive Essays, ed. (New York: Oxford University Press, 1987).
