= Sharon Church (artist) =

American jewelry designer (born 1948)

- Born: 1948; Richland, Washington
- Died: 2022 (aged 73–74)
- Education: Skidmore College, Rochester Institute of Technology
- Employer: University of the Arts
- Website: www.sharonchurchjewelry.net

External videos
- “2012 American Craft Council Fellow: Sharon Church”

Sharon Church (born 1948; died 2022) was an American studio jeweler, metalsmith, and educator. She was a professor emerita of the University of the Arts (Philadelphia) in Philadelphia, Pennsylvania. In 2012, Church was elected a Fellow of the American Craft Council (ACC). In 2018, she received a Lifetime Achievement Award from the Society of North American Goldsmiths.

== Early years ==
Sharon Church was born in 1948 in Richland, Washington to Gilbert Patterson Church and Winona Skinner. Church grew up in Wilmington, Delaware, graduating from the Tower Hill School, Class of 1966. Her father was a construction engineer for DuPont Co, and she recalled growing up watching her mother doing craft work and wearing jewelry.

== Education ==
In 1970, Church earned a B.S. from Skidmore College, where she was a student of Earl Pardon. She began working with wood while at Skidmore College. She was encouraged to be a carver and work subtractively as a student of Albert Paley during her first year at graduate school. Church earned an M.F.A. from The School for American Craftsmen at the Rochester Institute of Technology in 1973.

== Teaching ==
In 1979 Church moved from Wilmington, Delaware, to Philadelphia, Pennsylvania to begin teaching at the Philadelphia College of Art (later Craft + Material Studies program at the University of the Arts (Philadelphia)). After 35 years, she retired in 2014, becoming professor emerita.

“I really believe craft has within it the key to valuing a human life,” she says. “To make something with your hands, to know that you exist, to see that that existence has value – even for someone who just likes doing it, it has enormous value.” Sharon Church

== Making ==
Sharon Church was known for carving materials like wood, horn, and bone and sometimes incorporating them into works with precious metals and stones. She often uses Castello boxwood or ebony. Church often began with a drawing, but does not plan out the entire piece. She slowly developed her pieces through trial and error, experimenting with processes, techniques and materials until she felt a piece was complete. If she could not resolve a piece, she would put it away, discard it or reclaim the materials.

She drew heavily on nature both as a model and for materials. Following the death of her first husband in 1993, Church began to make carved wood a key element of her jewelry and sculptures. Her first piece in this style, It was the Most Beautiful Day of the Summer (1995), resembles both a fox's head and a cloven heart, in gold and ebony.

== Professional activities ==
Church has served on the board of directors of the Society of North American Goldsmiths (1983-1987). She has been the production coordinator for Metalsmith magazine (1986-1987) and served on its editorial advisory committee. She has written for Metalsmith and other magazines. She is a member of the American Craft Council and of Art Jewelry Forum.

== Public collections ==
Church's work is included in the permanent collections of the Yale University Art Gallery; Metropolitan Museum of Art; Museum of Arts and Design, New York City; Museum of Fine Arts, Boston; Pinakothek der Moderne, Munich, Germany; National Gallery of Australia; Museum of Fine Arts Houston; State Hermitage Museum St. Petersburg, Russia; Los Angeles County Museum of Art; Philadelphia Museum of Art; and the Delaware Art Museum. Her work, Oh No!, was acquired by the Smithsonian American Art Museum as part of the Renwick Gallery's 50th Anniversary Campaign.

== Awards and honors ==
- 2018, Lifetime Achievement Award, Society of North American Goldsmiths (SNAG)
- 2018, Distinguished Artist, James Renwick Alliance
- 2015, “Master of American Craft”, American Craft Council.
- 2012. Elected Fellow, American Craft Council College of Fellows
- 2010, Medal of Distinction, Philadelphia Art Alliance
- 2008, Distinguished Educator Award, James Renwick Alliance
- 2004, Richard C. von Hess Faculty Prize, University of the Arts
- 1999, Lindback Distinguished Teaching Award, University of the Arts
- 1977, Craftsmen's Fellowship, National Endowment for the Arts
