= Peter Nichols (author) =

American writer, academic (born 1950)

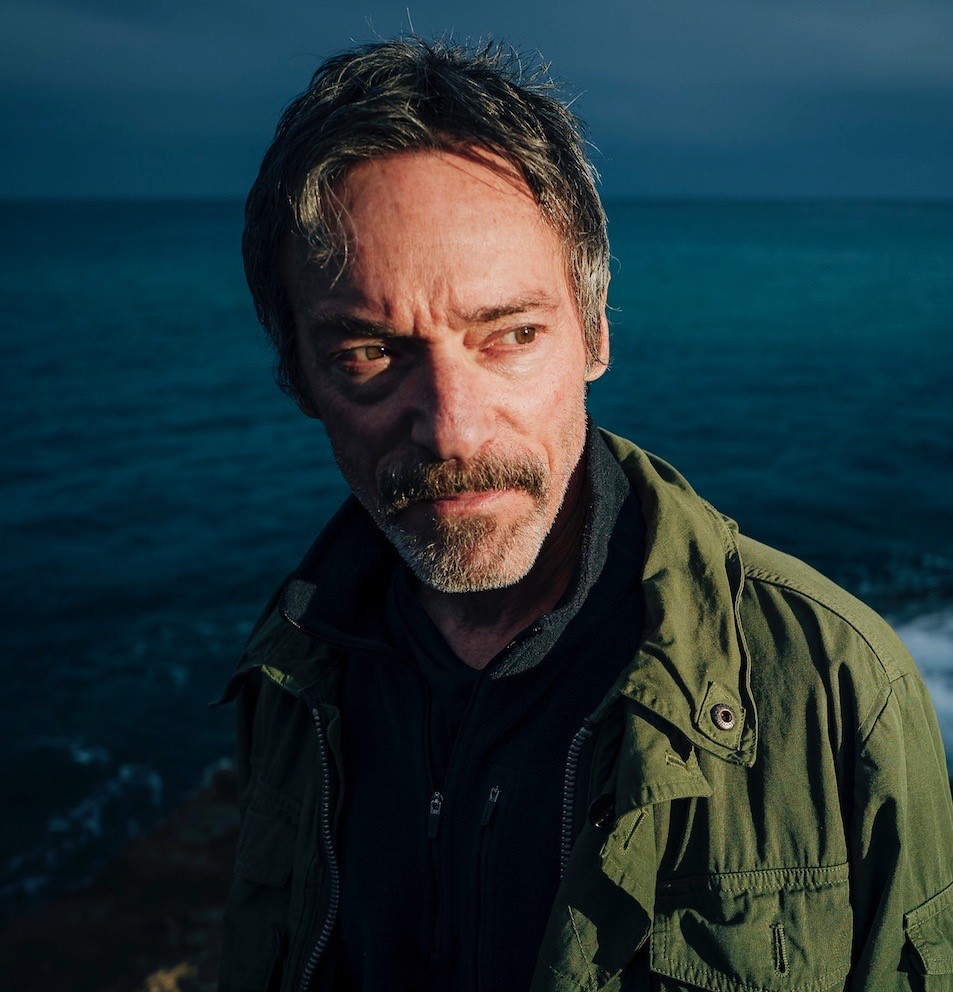
- Nichols in 2019
- Born: New York City, New York, U.S.
- Education: Skidmore College; Antioch University Los Angeles
- Occupations: Writer, professor
- Writing career
- Genres: Fiction, non-fiction (including memoir)

Peter Brayton Nichols is an American writer and academic.

He is known for his bestsellers The Rocks (2015, a novel); A Voyage for Madmen (2001, non-fiction), which was a finalist for the William Hill Sports Book of the Year; and Evolution's Captain (2003, non-fiction). His novel Voyage to the North Star was a Book of the Month Club main selection and was nominated for the International IMPAC Dublin Literary Award.

Nichols has taught creative writing at Georgetown University, NYU Paris, Bowdoin College, the University of Arizona, and the writing programs at Fairfield University (Connecticut), the University of Arkansas at Monticello, and Antioch University Los Angeles.

== Early life and education ==
Nichols was born in New York City and moved with his family to Britain when he was nine. He attended boarding school in England, and briefly attended East 15 Acting School in London. He earned a Bachelor of Arts degree at Skidmore College, and a Master of Fine Arts degree at Antioch University, Los Angeles. He worked variously in advertising, as journalist, and screenwriter.

== Career ==
In his late twenties and early thirties, Nichols lived on a small wooden sailboat in the Caribbean and Mediterranean. He became a U.S. Coast Guard licensed yacht captain and navigator, worked as a professional yacht charter and sailboat delivery captain, and has sailed across the Atlantic Ocean three times on small yachts. A solo crossing of the Atlantic is recounted in his memoir, Sea Change; Alone Across the Atlantic in a Wooden Boat (1997).

In 2009, Nichols sailed across the Atlantic at the invitation of Dutch public-television channel VPRO. He accompanied the great-great-grandsons of Charles Darwin and Robert FitzRoy, the captain of HMS Beagle, on the square-rigged tall ship Stad Amsterdam to recreate the voyage of the Beagle and mark the 150th anniversary of the publication of On the Origin of Species by Charles Darwin.

== Bibliography ==
=== Non-fiction ===
==== Memoir ====
- Sea Change; Alone Across the Atlantic in a Wooden Boat (1997) (ISBN 1574092928)

==== Other non-fiction ====
- A Voyage for Madmen (2001) (ISBN 073227592X)
- Evolution's Captain (2004) (ISBN 0060088788)
- Oil & Ice (2010) (ISBN 0143118366)

=== Fiction ===
- Voyage to the North Star (1999) (ISBN 0786706643)
- The Rocks (2015) (ISBN 978-1-59463-331-7)
- Granite Harbor (2023) (ISBN 978-1-25089-481-6)
