= Lise Bang-Jensen =

American journalist

- Education: Skidmore College (B.A.); Cornell University (M.A)
- Occupations: Journalist, policy analyst
- Employer: New York State Bar Association
- Known for: Inside Albany

Lise Bang-Jensen is a journalist and policy analyst. From 2008 through 2011, she served as a senior policy analyst at the Manhattan Institute for Policy Research's Empire Center for New York State Policy and was formerly a reporter, producer and co-host of the New York-based public affairs television program Inside Albany. She has served as director of media services and public affairs for the New York State Bar Association since 2011.

From 1981 through 1987, Bang-Jensen was a state capitol reporter for The Knickerbocker News. She joined Inside Albany in 1987 after The Knickerbocker News ceased publication. David Hepp, Bang-Jensen and others formed an independent production company after public television stations, citing financial reasons, cancelled it originally in July 1995. At that time, Inside Albany had been one of the longest-running TV programs in the nation. Enough money was raised to renew the program. Inside Albany resumed broadcasting in 1996.

Bang-Jensen started her career as a newspaper reporter. Her articles appeared in such newspapers as The Boston Globe, Empire State Report, The Wall Street Journal, The Washington Post and Ithaca Journal. She also contributed to New York Public Radio.

She has won a number of journalism awards, including from the NYS Broadcasters Association, United Press International and NYS Publishers Association.

On December 12, 2006, it was announced that Inside Albany was ending its run on December 31, 2006.
