= Patricia Glibert =

Phytoplankton ecologist

- Education: Harvard University
- Scientific career
- Workplaces: University of Maryland
- Thesis: Uptake and remineralization of ammonium by marine plankton (1982)
- Doctoral students: Deborah Bronk

Patricia Marguerite Glibert is a marine scientist known for her research on nutrient use by phytoplankton and harmful algal blooms in the Chesapeake Bay. She is an elected fellow of the American Association for the Advancement of Science.

== Education and career ==
Glibert has an undergraduate degree from Skidmore College and a master's degree from the University of New Hampshire, where she examined the movement of nutrients in an estuary. Glibert moved to Harvard University for her Ph.D., which she earned in 1982 with a dissertation working on the uptake of ammonium by small marine organisms. Following her Ph.D., Glibert was a postdoctoral researcher and scientist at Woods Hole Oceanographic Institution. In 1986 Glibert moved to the University of Maryland, where she was promoted to professor in 1993.

In 2020, Glibert was elected president-elect of the Association for the Sciences of Limnology and Oceanography (ASLO), and followed Roxane Maranger as president in 2022.

== Research ==
Glibert's research centers on nutrients, phytoplankton, and harmful algal blooms, especially the connection between harmful algal blooms and nutrients. She has conducted this research in multiple locations including Shinnecock Bay, Long Island, Florida Bay, the Chesapeake Bay, Kuwait Bay, the Scotian Shelf, the waters off Cape Cod, and the Chesapeake Bay. She has examined the production and consumption of nitrogen, the effect of temperature on nutrient uptake, and the role of mixotrophy in nutrient use. Her work includes investigations into nutrient cycling in model organisms including Trichodesmium, Prorocentrum, and Synechococcus. Glibert's research encompasses issues of climate change and human impacts on the environment.

== Selected publications ==
- Kemp, Wm; Boynton, Wr; Adolf, Je; Boesch, Df; Boicourt, Wc; Brush, G; Cornwell, Jc; Fisher, Tr; Glibert, Pm; Hagy, Jd; Harding, Lw (2005-11-21). "Eutrophication of Chesapeake Bay: historical trends and ecological interactions". Marine Ecology Progress Series. 303: 1–29. Bibcode:2005MEPS..303....1K. doi:10.3354/meps303001. ISSN 0171-8630.
- Glibert, Patricia M.; Harrison, John; Heil, Cynthia; Seitzinger, Sybil (February 2006). "Escalating Worldwide use of Urea – A Global Change Contributing to Coastal Eutrophication". Biogeochemistry. 77 (3): 441–463. doi:10.1007/s10533-005-3070-5. S2CID 2209850.
- Anderson, Donald M.; Glibert, Patricia M.; Burkholder, Joann M. (2002). "Harmful algal blooms and eutrophication: Nutrient sources, composition, and consequences". Estuaries. 25 (4): 704–726. doi:10.1007/BF02804901. ISSN 0160-8347. S2CID 44207554.
- Glibert, Patricia M.; Wilkerson, Frances P.; Dugdale, Richard C.; Raven, John A.; Dupont, Christopher L.; Leavitt, Peter R.; Parker, Alexander E.; Burkholder, JoAnn M.; Kana, Todd M. (2016). "Pluses and minuses of ammonium and nitrate uptake and assimilation by phytoplankton and implications for productivity and community composition, with emphasis on nitrogen-enriched conditions". Limnology and Oceanography. 61 (1): 165–197. Bibcode:2016LimOc..61..165G. doi:10.1002/lno.10203. hdl:10453/41397. ISSN 1939-5590. S2CID 16561857.
- Global ecology and oceanography of harmful algal blooms. Patricia M. Glibert, Elisa Berdalet, Michele A. Burford, Grant C. Pitcher, Mingjiang Zhou, O. L. Lange. Cham, Switzerland. 2018. ISBN 978-3-319-70069-4. OCLC 1032810395.

== Awards and honors ==
Glibert received an honorary doctorate from Linnaeus University in 2011, and was elected a fellow of the American Association for the Advancement of Science in 2012. She has also been named one of the top women professors in Maryland (2013), and is a sustaining fellow of the Association for the Sciences of Limnology and Oceanography (2016).

== Personal life ==
Glibert describes herself as "one-half dual-career couple" and is married to Todd Kana, a phytoplankton ecologist at the University of Maryland. In 2016 they published Aquatic Microbial Ecology and Biochemistry: A Dual Perspective, a collection written by dual career couples who have collaborated on research in the field. They have three children; Glibert's daughter was the first child born to a woman scientist at Woods Hole Oceanographic Institution.
