= David Hepp =

American journalist

David Hepp is an American journalist and former public television producer. He and Lise Bang-Jensen created the Albany, New York-based Inside Albany news television program, which ran for several decades until it ceased production on December 31, 2006.

Hepp received the Alfred I. duPont–Columbia University Award "for excellence in television journalism" as well as awards from the Associated Press, the American Bar Association, the New York State Bar Association and the New York State Broadcasters Association.

Hepp holds degrees from Siena College and Syracuse University's Newhouse School of Public Communications.
