= Roxane Maranger =

Aquatic ecologist

- Education: Université du Québec à Montréal
- Scientific career
- Workplaces: Université de Montréal
- Thesis: Facteurs qui contrôlent les bactéries en milieux aquatiques (1999)
- Doctoral advisor: David Bird

Roxane Maranger is a professor at Université de Montréal and Canada Research Chair Tier I in Aquatic Ecosystem Science and Sustainability known for her research on the impact of humans on water quality in lakes. From July 2020 - July 2022, she served as the president of the Association for the Sciences of Limnology and Oceanography (ASLO).

== Education and career ==
Maranger received her B.Sc. from McGill University in 1992. She moved to the Université du Québec à Montréal where she received an M.Sc. in 1995 working on viruses in sea ice and freshwater lakes. In 1999 she earned her Ph.D. from Université du Québec à Montréal where she worked on the factors controlling bacteria in lakes. Following her Ph.D. she was a postdoctoral scientist at the Cary Institute of Ecosystem Studies before she joined the faculty of the Université de Montréal in 2003. She was promoted to professor in 2015 and was awarded a Canada Research Chair Tier I in Aquatic Science and Sustainability in 2021.

She served on the steering committee for French National Centre for Scientific Research, and worked to set up the Secretariat for Future Earth. From 2020 until 2022 Maranger served as the President of the Association for the Sciences of Limnology and Oceanography (ASLO).

== Research ==
Maranger is known for her research on the biogeochemistry of lakes, ecosystem ecology, and the connections between human actions and water quality. Her early research examined the role of viruses in aquatic systems in polar regions and tracked the transfer of iron from bacteria into mixotrophic phytoplankton. Maranger has examined the flux of nutrients through different pools, including quantifying the return of nutrients from the sea to land because of commercial fisheries. She has modeled the amount of phosphorus that can be absorbed by lakes, which impacts how long before ecosystems will recover from the addition of excess phosphate as fertilizer. Her research has applied a trophic state index, a metric of water quality, to assess when a water mass can meet the needs of its users. In lakes, she has examined the connection between climate warming and the form of carbon stored in a lake which has implications for how lakes will respond to future climate perturbations.

== Selected publications ==
- Maranger, Roxane; Bird, David F.; Juniper, S. Kim (1994). "Viral and bacterial dynamics in Arctic sea ice during the spring algal bloom near Resolute, N.W.T., Canada". Marine Ecology Progress Series. 111 (1/2): 121–127. Bibcode:1994MEPS..111..121M. doi:10.3354/meps111121. ISSN 0171-8630. JSTOR 24847616.
- Maranger, R; Bird, Df (1995). "Viral abundance in aquatic systems:a comparison between marine and fresh waters". Marine Ecology Progress Series. 121: 217–226. Bibcode:1995MEPS..121..217M. doi:10.3354/meps121217.
- Glibert, Patricia M; Maranger, Roxane; Sobota, Daniel J; Bouwman, Lex (1 October 2014). "The Haber Bosch–harmful algal bloom (HB–HAB) link". Environmental Research Letters. 9 (10) 105001. Bibcode:2014ERL.....9j5001G. doi:10.1088/1748-9326/9/10/105001. S2CID 154724892.
- Harrison, John A.; Maranger, Roxane J.; Alexander, Richard B.; Giblin, Anne E.; Jacinthe, Pierre-Andre; Mayorga, Emilio; Seitzinger, Sybil P.; Sobota, Daniel J.; Wollheim, Wilfred M. (March 2009). "The regional and global significance of nitrogen removal in lakes and reservoirs". Biogeochemistry. 93 (1–2): 143–157. doi:10.1007/s10533-008-9272-x. hdl:1912/3097. S2CID 93357865.
