= Lose/Lose =

2009 art video game

- A screenshot of the game
- Developer: Zach Gage
- Engine: Open Frameworks
- Platform: MacOS
- Release: 2009
- Genres: Shoot 'em up, art game
- Mode: Single-player

Lose/Lose is a shoot-'em-up and art video game developed by Zach Gage and released in 2009 for MacOS as part of his master's thesis show, "Data", at Parsons School of Design's MFA program. Styled after games like Galaga, the player controls a spaceship and can shoot at aliens in their path, each representing a random file on the player's computer. Destroying an alien causes the file to be deleted, potentially corrupting the player's operating system, while dying causes the game itself to be deleted. The aliens do not attack and only act as dangerous obstacles. The game received notoriety for its potentially harmful game mechanic, and was classified by Symantec as malware.

== Reception ==
Stephen Totilo of Kotaku called Symantec's decision to classify the game as dangerous "the power [...] to suggest a game can have real-world consequences", deeming it "a victory for Gage". Bitmob of VentureBeat called the game scary, saying that "in 3 seconds, I need to reinstall Call of Duty 4, Unreal Tournament 2004 and replace several icons". They suggested that people not download the game, saying that "the fact that it has a leaderboard, a disturbing twist to the game and simplicity makes it all the more alluring", and stated that the game would "really scar you".

Kieron Gillen of Rock, Paper, Shotgun said that he was "a fan of using your PC's files as part of the game", and remarked that "people are not playing it for obvious reasons". Michael Conroy of Wired UK called the game "the sort of computer game that most people will be too afraid to install".
