= Jessica Wahman =

American philosopher (born 1968)

- Born: 1968 (age 57–58)
- Spouse: John J. Stuhr (m. 2012)

Education
- Education: Stony Brook University (PhD), Skidmore College (BA)

Philosophical work
- Era: 21st-century philosophy
- Region: Western philosophy
- Institutions: Emory University
- Main interests: philosophical psychology, metaphysics, philosophy of mind

Jessica Wahman (born 1968) is an American philosopher and associate teaching professor of philosophy at Emory University. She is known for her works on philosophical psychology, metaphysics, and philosophy of mind.

== Books ==
- Narrative Naturalism: An Alternative Framework for Philosophy of Mind, Lexington Books 2015
- Cosmopolitanism and Place (ed.), Indiana University Press 2017
