= Courtney Mattison =

American artist

- Born: 1985 (age 40–41)
- Education: Skidmore College, Brown University
- Notable work: Our Changing Seas III, Revolve, Confluence (Our Changing Seas V)
- Website: courtneymattison.com

Courtney Mattison (born in 1985) is an American artist involved in marine biology and ceramics. She hand-crafts sculptural installations inspired by coral reefs and climate change, that are exhibited in art museums and building lobbies around the world.

== Education ==
She is an artist who is known for her sculptures all around the world. She received a Bachelor of Arts degree in marine ecology and ceramic sculpture from Skidmore College in New York that included coursework at James Cook University in Australia. After graduating in 2008, she spent a year as a fellow at the Harvard Ceramics Program before earning a Master of Arts in environmental studies at Brown University, where she completed half of her coursework at the Rhode Island School of Design.

== Work ==
Mattison creates complex installations composed of many ceramic pieces sculpted to look like coral and other marine organisms. She builds hollow ceramic forms and manipulates their surfaces using simple tools such as paintbrushes and chopsticks to create textures that mimic the porous cavities of coral colonies. Pieces are bisque fired, glazed and fired again before being fitted with hardware. Her wall installations have been composed of as many as 2,000 individual pieces.

In 2011, Mattison created her debut sculptural installation displayed in the lobby of the U.S. Department of Commerce in Washington, D.C., through the National Oceanic and Atmospheric Administration. In 2014, she created Our Changing Seas III, a wall relief of massive, intricately hand-detailed ceramic sculptures to represent coral reefs in the midst of being bleached. In 2021, Mattison introduced the works Revolve and Our Changing Seas VII, featuring combinations of vibrant forms of healthy reef creatures with others sculpted in white porcelain to convey the effects of the climate crisis, including bleaching.

One of her installations, called Confluence (Our Changing Seas V), was a project commissioned by the U.S. Department of State through their Art in Embassies office and is permanently installed in the U.S. Embassy in Jakarta, Indonesia in 2021. It was known to be Mattison's largest work to that point. Her works are also permanently installed in The Seabird Resort in Oceanside, California, the Nova Southeastern University Oceanographic Center in Dania Beach, Florida, and the Coral Triangle Center in Bali, Indonesia.
