= I. Elaine Allen =

American survey statistician and biostatistician

Isabel Elaine Allen
- Education: Skidmore College; University of Evansville; Cornell University (PhD)
- Awards: Edward R. Murrow Award (2020)
- Scientific career
- Fields: Statistics
- Workplaces: Wharton School of the University of Pennsylvania; Medical College of Pennsylvania; Rutgers University; Babson College; University of California, San Francisco

Isabel Elaine Allen is an American survey statistician and biostatistician who works in distance education, the theory of Likert scales, antibacterial treatments, and meta-analysis of medical trials. She is a professor of biostatistics and epidemiology at the University of California, San Francisco, and a professor emeritus of statistics at Babson College.

== Education and career ==
Allen majored in psychology at Skidmore College, graduating in 1970. She earned a master's degree in mathematics at the University of Evansville in 1975, and completed her Ph.D. in statistics at Cornell University in 1979.

She took a faculty position at the Wharton School of the University of Pennsylvania even before completing her doctorate, and also held faculty positions at the Medical College of Pennsylvania and Rutgers University prior to her position at Babson College. She also taught at University of California, San Francisco.

As well as her academic work, Allen has helped to found several companies, including the Quahog Research Group, ARIAD Pharmaceuticals, Pondview Associates, StatSystems, and Bay View Analytics.

== Recognition ==
Allen was named a Fellow of the American Statistical Association in 2004. She was the main statistical expert for an investigative journalism project concerning fair housing, "Long Island Divided", which won the 2020 Edward R. Murrow Award of the Radio Television Digital News Association for a news documentary by a large digital news organization.

Skidmore College gave her their Creative Thought Matters Award of Distinction award in 2015.
