= Michael Counts =

American theater director (born 1970)

- Born: 1970 (age 55–56); New York City, U.S.
- Education: Skidmore College (BA)
- Occupations: Director, designer, visual artist
- Years active: 1993–present
- Known for: Immersive theatre, artistic director of GAle GAtes et al.
- Notable work: The Field of Mars, 1839, Tilly Losch, So Long Ago I Can't Remember, Monodramas

Michael Counts (born 1970) is an American stage director and theater designer. With Michelle Stern and John Oglevee, he co-founded GAle GAtes et al., a performance and visual arts company in Brooklyn's DUMBO neighborhood that operated from 1995 to 2003. He has also worked as a consultant for Disney theme parks.

== Early life and education ==
Counts was born in New York City, the son of Carolyn Counts Fox (née Lawler) and Robert Milton Counts.

From 1988 to 1993, he studied theatre and economics at Skidmore College.

== Career ==
=== Theatre and performance ===
Counts was influenced by experimental theatre and by visual artists including Robert Wilson, Reza Abdoh, Richard Foreman, Joseph Cornell, John Cage, Merce Cunningham, Robert Rauschenberg, Marcel Duchamp, Antonin Artaud, and Gertrude Stein, who integrated visual media with experimental performance techniques.

In 1995, Counts created his second work for the Metropolitan Museum of Art promenade, The Making of a Mountain.

Counts's New York installation 90 Degrees from an Equinox? Where are We? And Where are We Going? was a twelve-hour performance installation staged over six days at 55 Water Street, with an environment made of wild grass harvested from Jamaica Bay. Actors performed texts by Gertrude Stein and John Cage alongside original and found texts. The installation wine-blue-open-water was a walk-through performance freely adapted from Homer's Odyssey, with a pre-recorded text by Ruth Margraff; set elements rolled in on wagons past performers stationed like statues, on a vacant floor of 67 Broad Street. Other works, including Oh... A Fifty-Year Dart (a series of episodes that unfolded over three months), Departure, Ark, and To SEA: Another Mountain, were performed at Grand Central Terminal, the SoHo Arts Festival, and the Tunnel nightclub.

Internationally, a nine-member company traveled to Thailand to collaborate with the BoiSakti Dance Theatre of Indonesia for the Bangkok–Bali–Berlin Festival. Counts, Stern, and Oglevee joined composer Joseph Diebes to study Butoh at Min Tanaka's Body Weather Farm in Japan, where Counts directed and designed I Dug a Pit a Meter Six in Either Direction and Filled it Full of Sake and I Mixed in Honey and Milk and Poured It Over Barley and Pine Nuts and Rice and Onion and Fruit and Blood and Stopped.

Over the next five years, Counts, Stern, and Diebes joined resident artists Michael Anderson, Tom Fruin, and Jeff Sugg to create four large-scale performance installations in the company's new space. The space opened in September 1997 with the performance installation To SEA: Another Ocean, which featured four performers and 500 blue umbrellas.

The first fully staged production Counts directed and designed in the new space was The Field of Mars, inspired by Tacitus's account of the burning of Rome. A one-line summary in the playbill read, "This performance is as a dream is, or a landscape. Its meaning is more or less what you determine." In December 1997, Peter Marks of The New York Times described The Field of Mars as "a little bit like chasing a two-year-old around an apartment." A sequel, The Field of Mars – Chapter 1, was mounted in 2006 by Counts Media.

Tilly Losch was produced in 1998 and described by Counts as "a dream one might have had if falling asleep after watching Casablanca". It took its inspiration from the eponymous shadow box sculpture by Joseph Cornell. The production was the first of two by GAle GAtes et al. to use a seating arrangement that gave a view of the 120-foot backstage area through an industrial passageway within the false proscenium. The warehouse setting allowed time for set development, including a hand-operated mechanism designed to tilt walls over a two-minute duration.

The title of 1839 (1999) refers to the year photography was invented; the work was conceived as a dream of Daguerre, "in which a child, in the guise of Oedipus, wanders through a landscape peopled by narcissists in love with their own photographed images."

The last large-scale performance installation produced by GAle GAtes et al. in DUMBO was So Long Ago I Can't Remember (2001), a free adaptation of Dante's The Divine Comedy, with a text by Kevin Oakes pre-recorded by the actors—who lip-synced their lines in the live performance—and choreography by Roht.

The only theatre production Counts has directed since was Play/Date, a site-specific "immersive theatre experience" produced by 3-Legged Dog and installed across the three levels of the Fat Baby nightclub on the Lower East Side.

=== Opera and orchestral music ===
In 2011, New York City Opera (NYCO) director George Steel invited Counts to direct and design a new production, Monodramas, at Lincoln Center.

In 2012, New York Philharmonic music director Alan Gilbert invited Counts to direct and design New York Philharmonic 360, a staging of "spatial music" for orchestra in the Park Avenue Armory's Drill Hall.

Counts returned to New York City Opera in 2013 to direct and design Rossini's Moses in Egypt. The set featured a backdrop of LED screens displaying imagery created in collaboration with Ada Whitney, co-founder and creative director of Beehive; Counts interspersed animations of night skies, deserts, and the parting of the Red Sea with abstract shapes and videos of natural forms. Moses in Egypt marked the first time New York City Opera had performed in its original home, City Center, since moving to Lincoln Center in the mid-1960s.

In 2016, Counts staged the world premiere of the seven-hour The Ouroboros Trilogy, a production by Beth Morrison Projects presented by ArtsEmerson at the Cutler Majestic Theatre in Boston. The work united three scores—by Scott Wheeler (Naga), Zhou Long (the Pulitzer Prize–winning Madame White Snake), and Paola Prestini (Gilgamesh)—under libretti by a single author, Cerise Lim Jacobs. Counts presented Madame White Snake at the Hong Kong Arts Festival in March 2019.

=== Immersive and interactive events and installations ===
The first work Counts created after the September 11 attacks was Looking Forward, a video homage to New York City mounted in April–May 2002 in the clock faces of the DUMBO clock tower.

In 2005, Counts and the Yellow Arrow Mobile App/Global Public Art Project created an immersive installation and exhibition for Piaget at Art Basel Miami, and in 2006 extended the project into an augmented reality game, ICUH8ING. Volunteers placed an estimated 7,535 Yellow Arrow stickers in 467 cities across 35 countries.

== Personal life ==
Counts lives in Brooklyn Heights with his wife, Sharon, and their two sons.
