= Philip A. Glotzbach =

American educator (born 1950)

7th President of Skidmore College
- In office 2003–2020
- Preceded by: Jamienne S. Studley
- Succeeded by: Marc C. Conner

Personal details
- Born: July 7, 1950 (age 76) New York City, New York, United States
- Spouse: Marie Barbara Millard (after 1971)
- Children: 2
- Parent: Paul Glotzbach (father)
- Education: University of Notre Dame (B.A., 1972); Yale University (Ph.D., 1979)
- Website: www.philipglotzbach.com

Philip A. Glotzbach (born 7 July 1950), is an American educator who was the president of Skidmore College. Glotzbach graduated summa cum laude in 1972 with a B.A. from the University of Notre Dame and earned a Ph.D. from Yale University in 1979. He became Skidmore's seventh president in 2003. It was announced in February 25, 2019 that Philip Glotzbach retired as President of Skidmore College at the end of the 2019-2020 academic year.

Glotzbach retired as Skidmore's president following the 2019–2020 academic year. The college announced that Marc C. Conner, provost of Washington and Lee University, would succeed Glotzbach in July 2020.

Academic offices
Preceded by Jamienne S. Studley	President of Skidmore College; 2003–2020	Succeeded by Marc C. Conner
