= TypeShift =

2017 video game

- App icon
- Developer: Zach Gage
- Publisher: Zach Gage (Note: Published for Android by Noodlecake Studios.)
- Platforms: Browser, iOS, Android
- Release: Browser, iOS; March 18, 2017; Android; December 20, 2017
- Genres: Word, puzzle
- Mode: Single-player

TypeShift is a 2017 word puzzle game developed and published by the American indie developer Zach Gage. The game was released for browsers and iOS in March 2017, followed by Android in December 2017. TypeShift was met with a positive reception.

== Gameplay ==
A game of TypeShift in progress on a standard stage. Letters that have already been used in a word are highlighted in green.

TypeShift is a word puzzle game in which the player must spell words by sliding letters in columns. When a player makes a word, the letters in the word turn green; the player's goal is to have all the letters on the stage be turned green. There are also "key" words, which if found, allow them to quickly solve a puzzle.

The game also includes "clue" stages in addition to the standard stages. In a clue stage, the player is presented with clues as well as the columns of letters. The player solves a clue by tapping on the clue and if they are correct, the clue will disappear.

== Development and release ==
TypeShift was developed by Zach Gage. The game was released for iOS on March 18, 2017. A web browser version was also released and hosted by Merriam-Webster but no longer appears to be available as of October 2021. An Android port, produced by Noodlecake Studios, was released on December 20, 2017.

In 2023, TypeShift was integrated into Puzzmo, a games portal developed by Gage and Orta Therox.

== Controversy ==
In 2021 some users raised objections to certain words that appeared in the game, which had been promoted by Merriam-Webster.

== Reception ==
Reception

Aggregate score
Aggregator	Score
Metacritic	86/100

TypeShift received "generally favorable" reviews from professional critics according to the review aggregator website Metacritic. Gamezebo praised the game's "substantial challenge without feeling impossible", that the game lets the player "learn new words and expand your vocabulary" and that it is "easy to make the ads disappear" while criticizing the limited number of puzzles available and that "the ads are a poor match for a beautiful game". TouchArcade called it an "attractive game with an enjoyable primary mechanic" but criticizing the game giving away the "key words" after solving a puzzle.
