= Robert Boyers (academic) =

American literary essayist (born 1942)

- Born: November 9, 1942 (age 84); New York City
- Occupations: Literary essayist, cultural critic, and memoirist
- Known for: Founding and editing Salmagundi

Academic background
- Education: Queens College, City University of New York (BA 1963); New York University (MA 1965)

Academic work
- Institutions: Skidmore College (1969–); New York State Summer Writers Institute (1987–); The New School for Social Research (1993–2017)

Robert Boyers (born November 9, 1942) is an American literary essayist, cultural critic and memoirist. Currently, he is the editor of the quarterly magazine Salmagundi, Professor of English at Skidmore College, and Director of the New York State Summer Writers Institute, which he founded in 1987.

Boyers is the author of twelve books, the editor of thirteen others, and author of numerous essays. He is best known as founder and editor of the quarterly magazine Salmagundi.

== Early life and education ==
Born on November 9, 1942 in Brooklyn, New York, Boyers was educated at Queens College of the City University of New York (BA, 1963) and New York University (MA, 1965). He received an Honorary Doctorate of Humane Letters from Queens College in 2003, on the fortieth anniversary of his graduation from that institution.

== Career ==
Boyers began his career as an instructor at The New School for Social Research in New York City in 1967, and was in the following year an instructor at the Baruch School of the City University of New York. In 1969, he joined Skidmore College as an assistant professor of English, and was promoted to associate professor in 1973. He became a professor of English in 1980, and has been serving in this position since then. From 1995 till 2006, he was the holder of the first Tisch Chair in Arts and Letters. He has been serving as Director of the New York State Summer Writers Institute since 1987, and was adjunct professor of Liberal Studies at The New School for Social Research Graduate Faculty from 1993 to 2017.

== Literary works ==
Boyers began writing for political and literary magazines in 1964, and his early essays and reviews appeared in The New Republic, Dissent, Partisan Review and other periodicals. Over the years he contributed more than 200 reviews and essays to magazines including Harpers, Granta, The Times Literary Supplement, The American Poetry Review, The American Scholar and The Chronicle of Higher Education.

Boyers’ early literary writing was often focused on the work of young writers whose work had not yet been discovered by most of his contemporaries.

=== Books ===
Boyers has authored eleven books, including a book of short stories, a volume of personal essays on the fate of ideas, and several works on the politics of novels and novelists. In the 1970s, he wrote three book-length monographs on literary critics: Lionel Trilling, F.R. Leavis, and R. P. Blackmur.

At the New York State Summer Writers Institute each July, Boyers delivered—five nights each week—substantial introductions to writers, with a selection of these introductions published by Ausable Press in 2002 as A Book of Common Praise.

In the 1980s and 1990s, Boyers devoted much of his attention to political issues, and wrote two books on what has been termed "the bloody crossroads," namely on the intersection of politics and the novel. These books were titled Atrocity & Amnesia: The Political Novel and The Dictator's Dictation.

Though he has continued to write literary and cultural criticism, Boyers also published in 2005 a book of short stories called Excitable Women, Damaged Men, discovering there what he called a new freedom and a new voice, which led him to move in a direction he had not anticipated for himself. The stories appeared in periodicals like Yale Review, Harvard Review and Parnassus, and also in the annual Pushcart Prize anthology.

The first of his books with a memoiristic aspect was the 2015 book called The Fate of Ideas, and there, in a lengthy introduction, Boyers describes his book as "sometimes personal, sometimes polemical… not a history of ideas but a series of interrogations". "My objective," Boyers writes, "is to dramatize my encounter with ideas the better to identify what has made them difficult and elusive, sometimes dangerous." Taking on such ideas as authority, beauty, pleasure, "the other," fidelity, realism and judgment, Boyers takes his reader on what novelist Mary Gordon describes as "a dance that is both demanding and exhilarating" in "an elegant and courageous book." His 2019 book, Tyranny of Virtue was reviewed by Kirkus Reviews as "A rousing call for speech on college campuses that is truly free, addressing uncomfortable issues while allowing room for dissent."

The book was published by Scribner in a 2021 paperback edition, with a new afterword, after Boyers had delivered several lectures and interviews based upon the book. Notable among the interviews conducted around The Tyranny of Virtue were hour-long sessions for The New Yorker Magazine (with Isaac Chotiner), for the magazine First Things and for some Public Radio Stations.

=== Editions ===
As editor of Salmagundi for more than fifty years, Boyers has sponsored the work of many leading writers and thinkers and devoted more than two dozen special issues to the publication of conference transcripts on such subjects as "The Clash of Civilizations," "Race & Racism," "Is This An Age of Museums," "Intellectuals," "Psychological Man," "Belief and Unbelief," "Good Art, Bad Art," "Identity," and "The Legacy of the German Refugee Intellectuals." More than a dozen of these special issues were subsequently published as books by Basic Books, Penguin, and Harper & Row. Since 1975 Boyers has edited Salmagundi with his wife, the poet Peg Boyers.

While editing Salmagundi from Skidmore College, Boyers also edited The Bennington Review at Bennington College from 1977 to 1983.

== Bibliography ==
- R.D. Laing and Anti-Psychiatry (1971) ISBN 9780060802295
- Contemporary Poetry in America: Essays and Interviews (1974) ISBN 9780805204728
- Excursions: Selected Literary Essays (1977) ISBN 9780804691482
- Lionel Trilling: Negative Capability and the Wisdom of Avoidance (1977) ISBN 9780826202284
- R.P. Blackmur, Poet-Critic: Toward a View of Poetic Objects (1981) ISBN 9780826203151
- The Salmagundi Reader (1983) ISBN 9780253350602
- Atrocity and Amnesia: The Political Novel Since 1945 (1985) ISBN 9780195050820
- After the Avant-garde: Essays on Art and Culture (1988) ISBN 9780271006093
- The New Salmagundi Reader (1996) ISBN 9780815603849
- A Book of Common Praise (Ausable Press, 2002) ISBN 9781931337038
- The Dictator's Dictation: The Politics of Novels and Novelists (2005) ISBN 9780231510073
- Excitable Women Damaged Men (2005) ISBN 9781885586407
- The Fate of Ideas: Seductions, Betrayals, Appraisals (2015) ISBN 9780231539890
- The Tyranny of Virtue: Identity, the Academy, and the Hunt for Political Heresies (2019) ISBN 9781982127183
- Maestros & Monsters: Days & Nights with Susan Sontag & George Steiner (2023) IBSN 9781942134886
