= SpellTower =

2011 puzzle video game

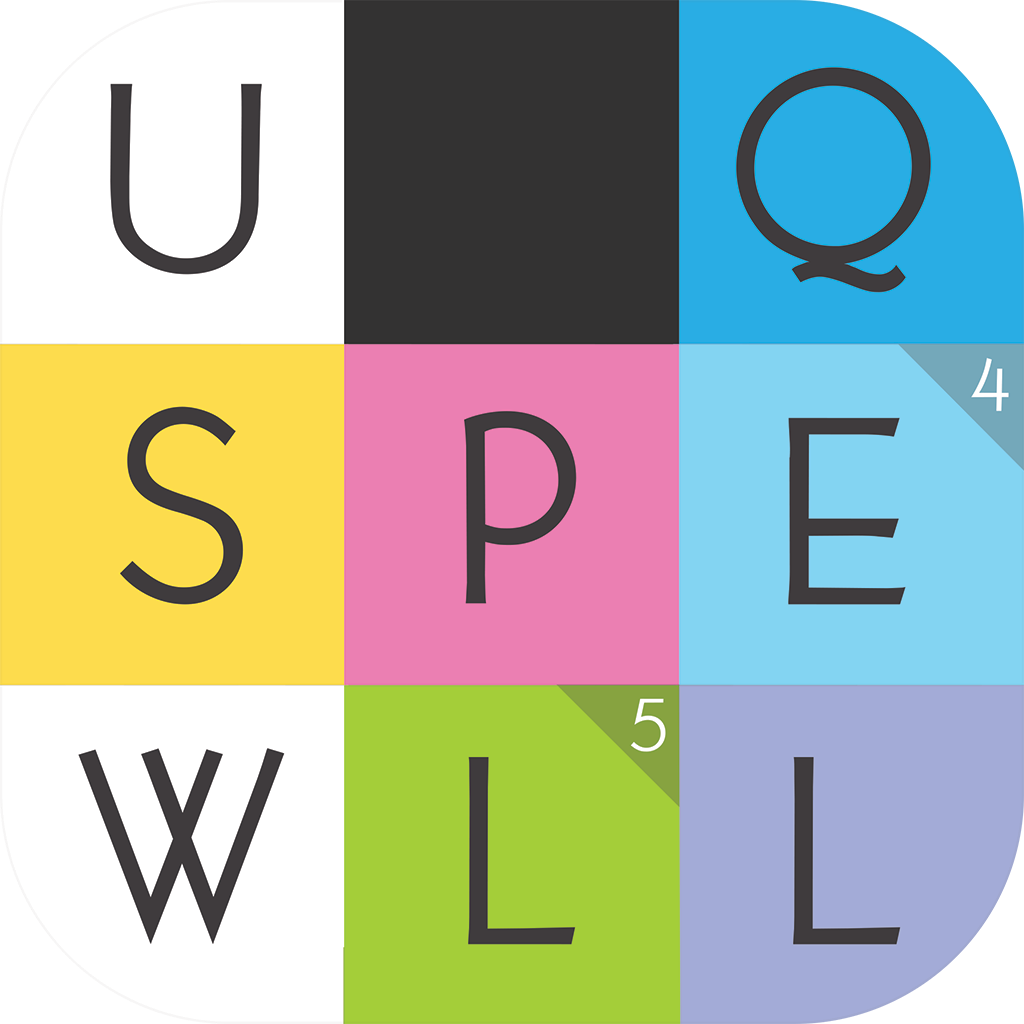
- App icon
- Developer: Zach Gage
- Publisher: Noodlecake Studios (Android)
- Platforms: iOS, OS X, Android
- Release: iOS; November 17, 2011; OS X July 25, 2012; Android; March 7, 2013 (Defunct); July 29, 2021 (Revival)
- Genres: Word game, puzzle
- Modes: Single-player, multiplayer

SpellTower is a 2011 word puzzle game developed by Zach Gage. In the game, the player must clear the screen before it overflows by creating words from assorted letter tiles. The game has several game modes and a multiplayer battle mode. The impetus for the game—the concept of combining elements from Tetris and Boggle in what was a prototype of the puzzle video game Puzzlejuice—inspired Gage to create SpellTower. The game was released for iOS in November 2011 to generally favorable reviews. Versions for OS X and Android followed over the next two years. In 2017 SpellTower Minutes was released. This browser-based Flash game created special "blitz" like modes not found in the mobile releases. A new iOS version released in 2017 swapped out the unnamed dictionary and began using Merriam-Webster's Third New International Dictionary, Unabridged. French and Dutch language specific versions were also released. A 2020 release, SpellTower+, added new game modes, cleaner visuals, and a jazz soundtrack.

== Gameplay ==
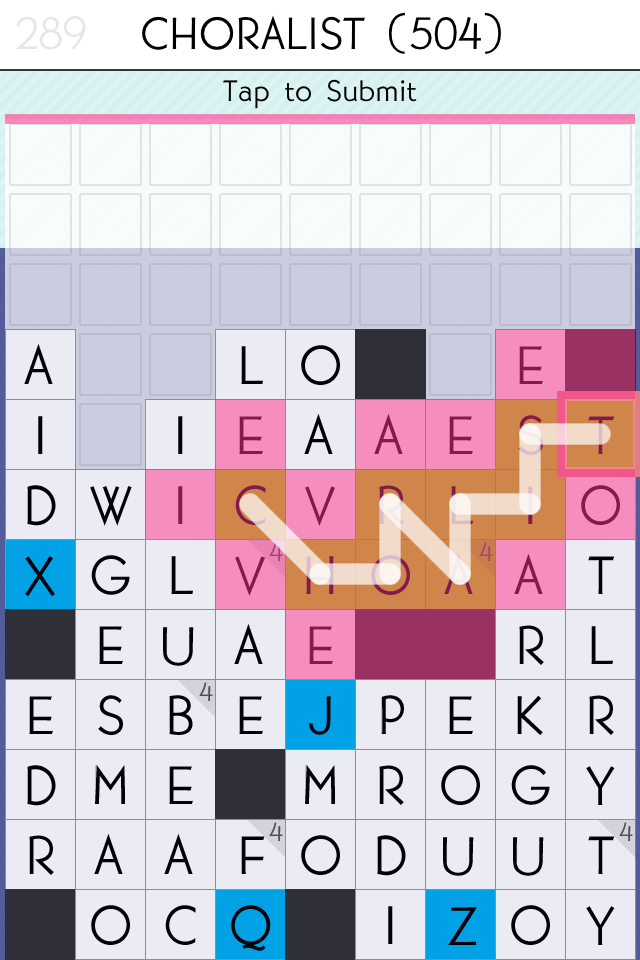
Video trailer and screenshot of gameplay

In the iPad puzzle video game SpellTower, the player attempts to clear the screen of jumbled, lettered tiles by using them to create words. The player can select adjacent and diagonal tiles to create words, which clears those tiles from the screen. If the player creates a long word with five or more tiles, any adjacent tile will be cleared as well. Additionally, difficult characters like X, Q, and J, will remove an entire row when used in a word. Some tiles are blank and can only be cleared by such an adjacent effect.

There are several game modes. In Tower mode, the player has 150 set tiles and tries to remove as many words as possible before running out of options. In Puzzle mode, for each set of tiles removed from the board, another row is added to the screen. The game ends when the tiles fill the screen. While Puzzle mode waits for the player's turn to add more tiles, Rush mode adds new tiles every few seconds. A later update added a multiplayer battle mode, where players can face each other across local Bluetooth connections. In battle mode, each completed word sends tiles to their opponent's screen.

== Development ==
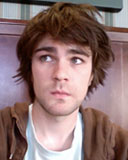
Zach Gage developed SpellTower.

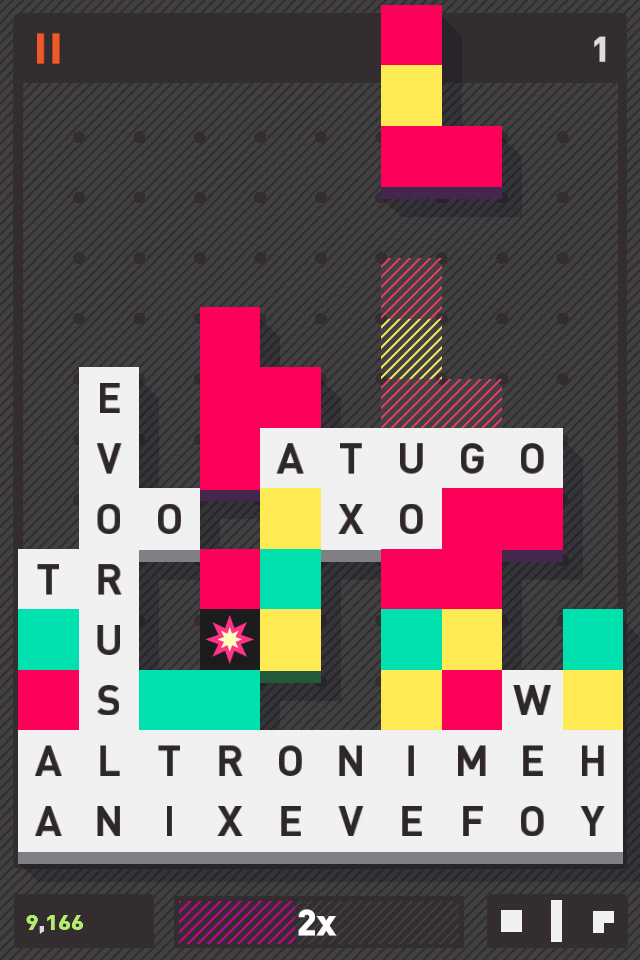
The concept behind Puzzlejuice (pictured)—to combine Tetris and Boggle—inspired Gage to create SpellTower.

When indie developer Zach Gage was first told about a video game that combined Tetris and Boggle, he had a very specific idea of how the game would play. But after seeing that the prototype of Puzzlejuice played differently, he created—with Asher Vollmer's permission—the version he imagined as SpellTower. Gage's game eventually released prior to the game that inspired it. (Note: Puzzlejuice developer Asher Vollmer and artist Greg Wohlwend ultimately decided that the two games were sufficiently different to justify continuing their development.)

SpellTower was released for the iPad tablet computer on November 17, 2011. A month later, Gage added support for iPhone and iPod Touch, and Game Center achievements. In 2012, Gage added local multiplayer support over Bluetooth in a new battle game mode. Gage later released versions for OS X (July 25, 2012) and Android (March 7, 2013). The Android release is identical apart from the omission of word lookup. It also supports local Wi-Fi multiplayer and high score competition via Scoreloop.

Gage and developer Jack Schlesinger rebuilt SpellTower from scratch to better accommodate changes made since its original release. The new version, SpellTower+, has a revised look, a new soundtrack, iCloud backup, and new game modes.

In 2023, SpellTower was integrated into Polygon's games portal Puzzmo, developed by Gage and Orta Therox, as a daily puzzle.

== Reception ==
Reception

Aggregate score
Aggregator	Score
Metacritic	84/100

Review scores
Publication	Score
Edge	8/10
Gamezebo	4/5
Pocket Gamer	9/10
TouchArcade	5/5
CNET	4.5/5

The game received "generally favorable" reviews, according to the video game review aggregator website Metacritic. Edge called it a "magnificent ... brainteaser that's nervy, humbling, and strangely energizing". The title was one of TouchArcade's honorable mentions for 2011 game of the year. A year later, TouchArcade said the game remained among the best on the App Store. In 2012, SpellTower was named among IGN's underrated iOS word games.

Edge compared the game's tension to that of Resident Evil's survival horror, though noted that Tower mode was much less tense than the game's Puzzle modes. The reviewer highlighted the role of strategy in both modes, as a small word might fare better than a large word in maintaining the growth of the Puzzle mode tower.
