= Daniel A. Nathan =

American scholar

Daniel A. Nathan is an American scholar who was the Douglas Family Chair in American Culture, History, and Literary and Interdisciplinary Studies at Skidmore College.

Nathan received his M.A. and Ph.D. in American Studies from the University of Iowa.

Nathan is known for his research on American sport, memory, and cultural representation.

He is a Past President of the North American Society for Sport History and is the editor of the Journal of Sport History.

His father is Irvin B. Nathan.

== Books ==
- Sports through the Lens: Essays on 25 Iconic Photographs (2024), edited with Maureen M. Smith and Sarah K. Fields
- Baseball Beyond Our Borders: An International Pastime (2017), edited with George Gmelch
- Baltimore Sports: Stories from Charm City (2016)
- Rooting for the Home Team: Sport, Community, and Identity (2013)
- Saying It's So: A Cultural History of the Black Sox Scandal (2003)

== Fellowships and awards ==
- Edwin M. Moseley Faculty Lectureship, 2021-2022
- North American Society for Sport History Book Award (anthology), 2014
- National Endowment for the Humanities Fellowship, 2005–06
- Webb-Smith Essay Competition winner (with Peter Berg and Erin Klemyk), 2005
- USA Track & Field Ken Doherty Memorial Fellowship, 2004
- North American Society for Sport History Book Award, 2004
- North American Society for the Sociology of Sport Book Award (monograph), 2003
- Fulbright Grantee, University of Tampere, Finland, 2001–02
- University of Iowa Ada Louisa Ballard/Seashore Dissertation Fellowship, 1996–97
