= Cassandra Giraldo =

American photojournalist

Cassandra Giraldo (born May 4, 1989) is an American cinematographer and documentary filmmaker based in Los Angeles, California. She was a staff producer and cinematographer for Vice News Tonight on HBO from 2016 to 2020 and has covered a range of social and political topics in the United States and abroad as a photojournalist and documentary cameraperson.

== Early life and education ==
Cassandra Giraldo was born in Los Angeles, California, in 1989. She is of Mexican-American and Colombian descent. She attended Skidmore College, where she earned a bachelor's degree in International Affairs and French in 2011. In 2012, she completed the Photojournalism & Documentary Studies Program at the International Center of Photography (ICP). During her time at ICP, she started The After School Project. After working as a freelance photographer for four years, Giraldo pursued a master's degree in investigative journalism at the Toni Stabile Center for Investigative Journalism at Columbia University Graduate School of Journalism, graduating in 2017.

== Career and documentary work ==
=== Photojournalism and cinematography ===
Giraldo's career has focused on visual storytelling, with her work appearing in major publications and documentary platforms. From 2016 to 2020, she was a staff producer and cinematographer at Vice News Tonight on HBO, contributing to news segments covering social justice movements, political protests, and cultural shifts in the U.S. Her work has been recognized for its raw and immersive approach, capturing underrepresented communities and contemporary youth culture.

==== Notable projects and exhibitions ====
- The GentlePunks – A documentary series that follows teenage punks in St. Petersburg, Russia, highlighting their counterculture identity and experiences with police intimidation.
- The After School Project – A long-term documentary photography project that captures the after-school lives of New York City teenagers. Inspired by a Brooklyn teen shooting, Giraldo sought to contrast the intimate and playful aspects of teenage life with the challenges of navigating urban environments. The project gained recognition through Instagram and was a finalist for the Getty Institute's inaugural Instagram grant in 2015.
- Chutanacuy – A photo-documentary project documenting carnival traditions in Ollantaytambo, Peru. The series captures local customs, including Chutanacuy, a tug-of-war-style competition that determines who will harvest the ceremonial "tree of gifts."

== Awards and recognition ==
- Emmy Award for Outstanding Coverage of a Breaking News Story in a Newscast (as part of Vice News Tonight’s coverage of the George Floyd protests in 2020).
- Winner, American Photography 32 (2016) – Photograph of the Brooklyn Technical High School football team from The After School Project.
- Finalist, Lucie Emerging Scholarship (2016).
- Bob Baxter Scholarship Winner, National Press Photographers Association (2016).
- Named "30 Under 30 Women Photographers" by Photo Boite (2016).
- Exceptional finalist, Getty Images Instagram Grant (2015).
