= Salmagundi (magazine) =

- Discipline: Literary journal
- Language: English

Publication details
- History: 1965-present
- Publisher: Skidmore College (United States)
- Frequency: Quarterly

Standard abbreviations
- ISO 4: Salmagundi

Indexing
- ISSN: 0036-3529
- JSTOR: 00363529

Links
- Journal homepage

Salmagundi is a US quarterly periodical, featuring cultural criticism, fiction, and poetry, along with transcripts of symposia and interviews with prominent writers and intellectuals. Susan Sontag, a longtime friend of the publication, referred to it as "simply my favorite little magazine." In The Book Wars, James Atlas writes that Salmagundi is "perhaps the country's leading journal of intellectual opinion."

== History and profile ==
Salmagundi was founded by Robert Boyers in the fall of 1965, using money he earned as a youth, singing at his neighborhood Jewish temple, and at weddings and Bar Mitzvahs. Boyers drew inspiration for his quarterly from other "little magazines" of the era, such as Partisan Review, F.R. Leavis's Scrutiny, and T.S. Eliot's Criterion, among others. The title of the magazine was chosen as a reference to the 19th-century periodical of the same name, published by Washington Irving.

In 1969, the magazine moved its headquarters to Skidmore College, in Saratoga Springs, N.Y. Boyers and his wife, Margarita "Peg" Boyers, are both professors in Skidmore's English Department. The magazine celebrated its Fiftieth Anniversary in 2015 by publishing three large volumes, featuring "Best Of" selections from Salmagundi's first five decades.

While the magazine has no explicit mission statement, Boyers has often invoked Lionel Trilling's description of the role served by little magazines in preventing the culture from "being cautious and settled, or merely sociological, or merely pious" and "to make the official representatives of literature a little uneasy."

Salmagundi's editors take pride in continually finding "ways to say NO and THINK AGAIN to the largely settled views of our own enlightened readership." Christopher Lasch, a frequent contributor to the Salmagundi until his death in 1994, observed, in 1975, that the magazine "often criticized leftist clichés from a point of view sympathetic to the underlying objectives of the left." Lasch further noted that Salmagundi reliably opposed "fake radicalism," "genteel academicism" and "estheticism," even as it recognized "the precarious position of intellectual culture in the modern world."

An aspect of Salmagundi that makes it unique from other literary magazines is its commitment to hosting (and transcribing, for publication) symposia, featuring lively debate among prominent scholars and writers. Past symposia have included figures such as, Lionel Trilling, Richard Rorty, Martha Nussbaum, Slavoj Zizek, Anthony Appiah, Orlando Patterson, Susan Sontag, and many others.

== Notable columnists and contributors ==
=== Critics and scholars ===
- Susan Sontag
- George Steiner
- Marilynne Robinson
- Christopher Hitchens
- James Miller
- Tzvetan Todorov
- Sir Isaiah Berlin
- William H. Gass
- Christopher Lasch
- Adam Phillips
- Phillip Lopate
- Steve Fraser
- Daniel Swift
- Siri Hustvedt
- George Scialabba

=== Novelists ===
- Russell Banks
- Joyce Carol Oates
- J.M. Coetzee
- Nadine Gordimer
- Mario Vargas Llosa
- Darryl Pinckney
- Steve Stern
- Mary Gordon
- Norman Manea
- Mary Gaitskill
- Rick Moody
- Amy Hempel
- Binnie Kirschenbaum
- Jim Shepard
- Howard Norman

=== Poets ===
- Robert Lowell
- Seamus Heaney
- Adrienne Rich
- Robert Pinsky
- Frank Bidart
- Richard Howard
- Marie Howe
- Charles Simic
- Louise Glück
- Carolyn Forché
- Honor Moore
- Carl Dennis
- Campbell McGrath
- Vijay Seshadri
- Rosanna Warren

== Notable essays, poetry, and fiction ==
- Edward Said's "Beginnings" (1966)
- Richard Schechner's "Theatre & Revolution" (1967)
- Howard Nemerov's "First Snow" (#22 - 23, 1973)
- Adrienne Rich's "Pieces" and "Incipience" (#22 - 23, 1973)
- Robert Lowell's "History" and "Man and Woman" (#22 - 23, 1973)
- Robert Penn Warren's "The Nature of A Mirror" (#22 - 23, 1973)
- Louise Glück's "Pomegranate" (#22 - 23, 1973)
- Leslie H. Farber's "Lying on the Couch" (1975)
- Howard Nemerov's "Ozymandias II" and "Ginkgoes in Fall" (#28, 1975)
- Robert Lowell's "Epilogue" (#37, 1977)
- Robert Penn Warren's "Question You Must Learn to Live Past" and "What Was The Thought?" (#50 - 51, 1980–81)
- Louise Glück's "First Goodbye" (#50 - 51, 1980–81)
- William H. Gass's "The Death of the Author" (1984)
- George Steiner's "Our Homeland, the Text" (1985)
- Seamus Heaney's "Place, Pastness, Poems: A Tryptch" (1986)
- Martin Jay's "The Descent of de Man" (1988)
- Christopher Lasch's "Counting by Tens" (1989)
- Robert Pinsky's "Shiva And Parvati Hiding In The Rain" (#85 - 86, 1990)
- Seamus Heaney's "Seeing Things" (#88 - 89, 1990–91)
- Natalia Ginzburg's "My Psychoanalysis" (1991) [Trans. from Italian by Lynne Sharon Schwartz]
- Jed Perl's "Abstract Questions" (1992)
- Sharon Olds's "Parent Visiting Day" and "His Smell" and "The Urn" and "To My Father" (#93, 1992)
- J.M. Coetzee's "Emerging from Censorship" (1993)
- Richard Howard's "My Last Hustler" (#100, 1993)
- James Miller's "Foucault's Politics in Biographical Perspective" (1993)
- Kwame Anthony Appiah's "Ancestral Voices" (1994)
- Roger Shattuck's "Second Thoughts on a Wooden Horse" (1995)
- Tzvetan Todorov's "The Touvier Trial" (1995) [Trans. from French by John Anzalone]
- Stanley Kauffmann's "What's Left of the Center?" (1996)
- Carl Dennis's "The God Who Loves You" (#111, 1996)
- J.M. Coetzee's "Realism" (#114 - 115, 1997) [This was eventually published as a chapter in Coetzee's acclaimed novel, Elizabeth Costello]
- Michael Ondaatje's "Buried" (#113, 1997)
- Charles Molesworth's "From Collage to Combine: Rauschenberg and Visual Culture" (1998)
- David Rieff's "In Rwanda: The Crisis of Humanitarianism" (1998)
- Joyce Carol Oates's "The Aesthetics of Fear" (1998)
- Marilynne Robinson's "The Fate of Ideas: Moses" (1999)
- Carl Dennis's "Progress" (#121 - 122, 1999)
- Frank Bidart's "Luggage" and "Hammer" (#121 - 122, 1999)
- C.K. Williams's "The Nail" (#121 - 122, 1999)
- Robert Pinsky's "Porch Steps" and "Song" (#124 - 125, 1999-2000)
- Carolyn Forché's "Nocturne" (#126 - 127, 2000)
- Frank Bidart's "Pre-Existing Forms: We Fill Them and When We Fill Them We Change Them and Are Changed" (2000)
- Carl Dennis's "The Photographer" (#135 - 136, 2002)
- Richard Howard's "Knowing When To Stop" (#135 - 136, 2002)
- C.K. Williams's "Inculcations" (#137 - 138, 2003)
- Carolyn Forché's "Death Bed" and "Fisherman" (#148 - 149, 2005–06)
- Honor Moore's "Violetta, 2000" (#144 - 145, 2004–05)
- Honor Moore's "Wallace Stevens" (#146 - 147, 2005)
- Frank Bidart's "Winter Spring Summer Fall" and "God's Catastrophe in Our Time" (#148 - 149, 2005–06)
- Seamus Heaney's "The Aerodrome" (#148 - 149, 2005–06)
- Robert Pinsky's "Work Song" (#148 - 149, 2005–06)
- Adam Phillips's "On What is Fundamental" (2009)
- Phillip Lopate's "How Do You End an Essay?" (2010)
- Charles Simic's "The Invisible" (#166 - 167, 2010)
- Siri Hustvedt's "The Real Story" (2012)

== See also ==
- List of literary magazines
