= Judith Pringle =

New Zealand organisational/social psychology academic

- Born: 1952 (age 73–74)
- Other name: Judith K. Pringle
- Education: University of Otago
- Scientific career
- Fields: social psychology
- Workplaces: Deakin University, University of Auckland
- Thesis: The definition, structure and measurement of social skill (1983)
- Website: www.aut.ac.nz/research/professors-at-aut/judith-pringle

Judith K. Pringle (born 1952) is a New Zealand organisational/social psychology academic. She is currently a full professor at the Auckland University of Technology.

== Academic career ==
After a BSc in psychology and an OE in Asia and Europe, Pringle returned to the University of Otago for a 1983 PhD in social psychology titled 'The definition, structure and measurement of social skill.' After teaching at Deakin University and the University of Auckland she move to Auckland University of Technology.

Much of Pringle's current work relates to gender and diversity in the workplace.

== Selected works ==
- Arthur, Michael, Kerr Inkson, and Judith Pringle. The new careers: Individual action and economic change. Sage, 1999.
- Inkson, Kerr, Michael B. Arthur, Judith Pringle, and Sean Barry. "Expatriate assignment versus overseas experience: Contrasting models of international human resource development." Journal of world business 32, no. 4 (1997): 351–368.
- Pringle, Judith, and Mary Mallon. "Challenges for the boundaryless career odyssey." International Journal of Human Resource Management 14, no. 5 (2003): 839–853.
- Prasad, Pushkala, Judith K. Pringle, and Alison M. Konrad. "Examining the contours of workplace diversity." Handbook of workplace diversity (2006): 1-22.
- Konrad, Alison M., Pushkala Prasad, and Judith Pringle, eds. Handbook of workplace diversity. Sage, 2005.
