= Really Bad Chess =

Mobile video game by Zach Gage

- iOS icon
- Developer: Zach Gage
- Publishers: iOS; Zach Gage; Android; Noodlecake Studios
- Engine: Unity
- Platforms: iOS; Android
- Release: iOS: WW: October 13, 2016; Android: WW: May 18, 2017
- Genre: Chess
- Mode: Single-player

Really Bad Chess (stylized as really bad chess) is a mobile video game developed by Zach Gage. It was released on October 13, 2016, for iOS, with a version for Android released in May 2017. The game is based on the original game of chess but contains rearranged boards.

== Gameplay ==
Position: a8 black knight, b8 black queen, c8 black pawn, d8 black bishop, e8 black king, f8 black pawn, g8 black pawn, h8 black rook, a7 black bishop, b7 black pawn, c7 black knight, d7 black knight, e7 black bishop, f7 black queen, g7 black rook, h7 black pawn, a2 white knight, b2 white knight, c2 white knight, d2 white bishop, e2 white pawn, f2 white queen, g2 white rook, h2 white queen, a1 white bishop, b1 white rook, c1 white queen, d1 white queen, e1 white king, f1 white pawn, g1 white knight, h1 white queen

An example opening setup

Really Bad Chess is played using a normal chess board, but with each player given one king and 15 other pieces selected at random based on the player's skill level. The pieces, moves, and goal are identical to the original game. Because of the rearranged pieces, players cannot use typical chess opening moves. Unlike in standard chess, in Really Bad Chess there are no draws: a stalemated player loses the game, and no draws can be claimed for reasons such as threefold repetition. As such, the game does not end when only the kings remain.

== Development ==
Really Bad Chess was developed by Zach Gage, the developer behind the 2015 solitaire mobile game Sage Solitaire. The game was released on October 13, 2016, for iOS devices. Some players have reported stability issues when playing the game. A port for Android, produced by Noodlecake Studios, was released in May 2017.

In 2023, Really Bad Chess is integrated within the games portal Puzzmo, developed by Gage and Orta Therox, as a daily puzzle.

== Reception ==
Stephen Totilo of video game news site Kotaku recommended the game to those with an iPhone because though he doesn't "care for chess", he enjoyed playing it. Rob Funnell of mobile gaming site TouchArcade awarded the game a 5/5 rating and said the game turns the "mundane task of learning chess into an extremely enjoyable experience".

Reviewers thought the game would be good for helping newer and more inexperienced chess players learn how the game works. Funnell believed Really Bad Chess was a good way for new players and chess veterans to learn how to understand chess, and eventually become better at the game through learning how to "read the board". Prior to release, Emma Kidwell of Kill Screen said the game "should be great for beginners to learn about the joy of landing a checkmate without having to study openings".

== See also ==
- Rules of chess
- List of chess variants
- Chess960
