= Zach Gage =

American indie video game developer

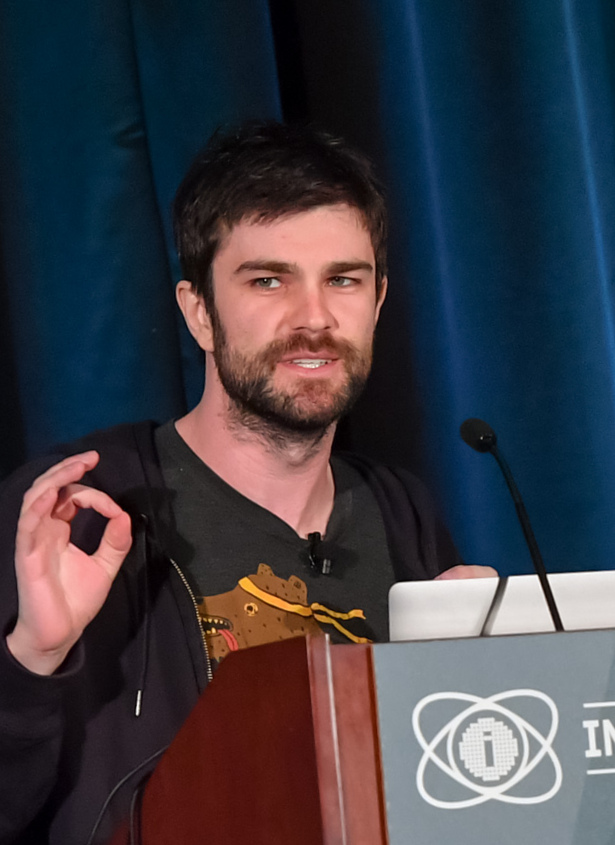
- Gage in 2018
- Born: 1985 (age 40–41); Brooklyn, New York, U.S.
- Occupation: Video game developer
- Known for: SpellTower; Ridiculous Fishing

Zach Gage (born 1985) is an independent video game programmer and designer based in New York City. He is known for his iOS games, including SpellTower.

Gage learned to code throughout his youth and studied art at Skidmore College and Parsons School of Design, where he created installation and interactive works. With the 2008 opening of Apple's App Store, Gage created multiple apps and games, including the word games SpellTower (2011), TypeShift (2017), and collaborative work on Vlambeer's 2013 Ridiculous Fishing and Bennett Foddy's 2017 Getting Over It iOS port. Gage also created multiple games based on playing card and board games, including Really Bad Chess (2016).

== Early life ==
Zach Gage was raised in Westchester, New York. His mother allowed few game purchases in their house, and coming from a family of artists, encouraged Gage to make his own games. He would retain this do it yourself mentality to learn new creative skills and escape later creative slumps. As a child, Gage created imaginary games with Kid Pix, the drawing software, on his family computer, a Macintosh LC, adventure games in Apple's hyperlink-based HyperCard software, and video games in Apple's Cocoa visual programming language for children. In his time with Cocoa, Gage collaborated with another teen developer, Greg Miller and created a demo for the company that purchased Cocoa from Apple, and contributed to a book on the language. He advanced to C++ and Java programming languages in high school, where he also developed an interest in photography. He attended Skidmore College and upon finding its computer science program lackluster, graduated with a degree in art in 2007. His new media thesis project was an interactive installation involving viewer tracking and video projection.

== Career ==
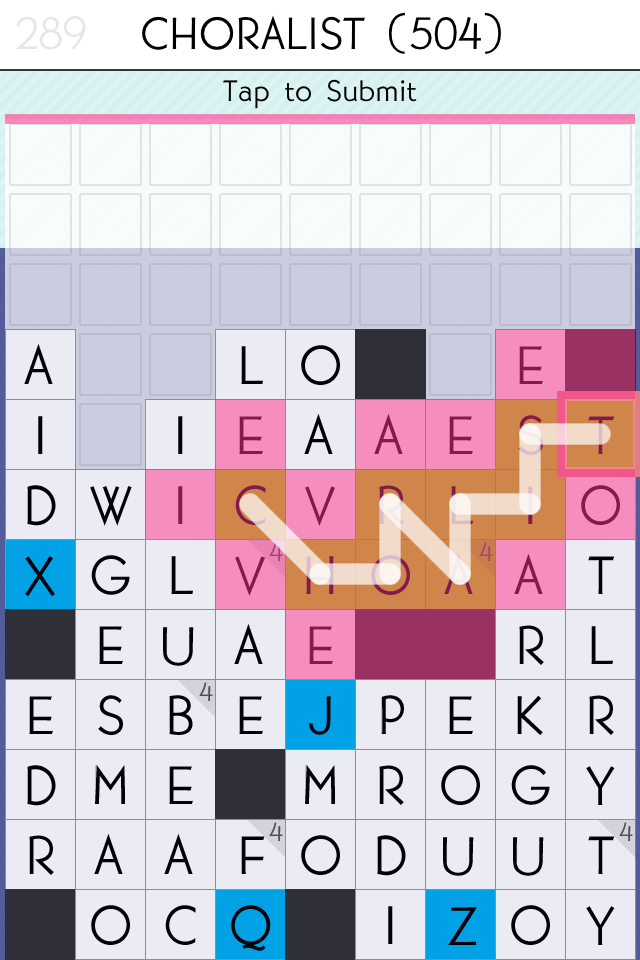
Video trailer and screenshot of
SpellTower gameplay

Gage returned to New York City after college and worked with Eyebeam. He was later hired to program an installation piece similar to his thesis for an exhibition at the Venice Biennale, which encouraged him to attempt new projects headlong. Back in New York, he completed a Master of Fine Arts degree at the Parsons School of Design, with a thesis show of multiple works on the relationship between data and the Internet. In its most infamous piece, Lose/Lose, the player shot on-screen aliens, each of which corresponded to a file on the player's hard drive. The conceptual project intended to question human propensity to follow directions and the real-life consequences of in-game decisions, following from works including Eddo Stern's Tekken Torture Tournament. Security company Symantec classified the game as malware.

Outside of his art work, Gage began programming for Apple's App Store upon its 2008 opening for submissions. He created a visual music sequencer (SynthPond) and a horizontal Tetris-style game (Unify). His next app, the word game SpellTower, was commercially successful and led to multiple venture capital offers that Gage declined in favor of staying independent. Gage had been inspired to design SpellTower by a conversation with Asher Vollmer who described his design for what would become Puzzlejuice, a word game which combined Tetris and Boggle; with Vollmer's permission, Gage developed his own version of the idea, and beat Vollmer to market by two months. Gage later worked as the iOS developer for Vlambeer's 2013 Ridiculous Fishing, in which players use motion and touch controls to catch fish and subsequently shoot them out of the sky for cash. During the peak of development, the game's artist Greg Wohlwend moved in with Gage to work 14-hour days. In Gage's #Fortune, a 2015 smartphone app, the user presses a button on a minimal interface to receive a fortune cookie-style fortune based on the Twitter messages of strangers. A user can receive three daily fortunes based on the time of day, and a countdown timer displays when the user can return. The app was based on a similar physical machine he had built. Gage also created digital games based on playing card and board games: Sage Solitaire (2015), Really Bad Chess (2016), and Flipflop Solitaire (2017). Gage also assisted in the iOS port of Getting Over It with Bennett Foddy.

A collaboration with Choice Provisions (of the Bit.Trip series) manifested as the 2016 strategy game Tharsis. As the systems designer, Gage worked to make the game's elements of chance exciting. Gage also created a card game, Guts of Glory, which he crowdfunded via Kickstarter. He participated in the 2016 Game Developers Conference game design challenge panel and his work was previously featured in the NYU Game Center's No Quarter exhibition. He is based in New York, as of 2012.

== Selected works ==
- Lose/Lose (2009)
- Bit Pilot (2010)
- Halcyon (2010)
- SpellTower (2011)
- Ridiculous Fishing (2013)
- Guts of Glory (2013)
- #Fortune (2015)
- Sage Solitaire (2015)
- Tharsis (2016)
- Really Bad Chess (2016)
- TypeShift (2017)
- Flipflop Solitaire (2017)
- Pocket-Run Pool (2018)
- Cozen (2018)
- Card of Darkness (2019)
- Good Sudoku (2020)
- Knotwords (2022)
- Puzzmo (2023)
