= Card of Darkness =

2019 iOS game

- Developers: Zach Gage; Choice Provisions
- Publisher: Zach Gage
- Artist: Pendleton Ward
- Platforms: iOS; tvOS; macOS
- Genre: Puzzle
- Mode: Single-player

Card of Darkness is a puzzle video game developed by Zach Gage and Choice Provisions and published by Zach Gage. It was originally released for iOS, macOS, and tvOS through Apple Arcade on September 19, 2019. The objective is to traverse dungeons and save the world using card game-style gameplay.

== Reception ==
The game received positive reviews from critics.

Sergio Velasquez of TouchArcade rated the game 4.5/5 stars, calling it a "fantastic game" with "simple, yet addictive gameplay", saying that the only "annoyance" was the game's randomly generated dungeons. Giorgio Melani of Multiplayer.it rated the game 8.5/10, praising its game mechanics and graphics.

Chris Plante of Polygon called the game "difficult", but said that it consumed his free time, also saying that it "excels in being easily readable". Gita Jackson of Kotaku stated that the game had the same appeal as Adventure Time, praising its simple story, which "frees up brainspace for understanding the complicated gameplay".
