= Heather Hurst =

American archaeologist

- Born: 1975 (age 50–51)
- Education: Skidmore College, Yale University
- Awards: MacArthur Fellows Program
- Scientific career
- Fields: archaeology
- Workplaces: Skidmore College

Heather Hurst (born 1975) is an American archaeologist and archaeological illustrator.

== Career ==
Hurst graduated from Skidmore College in 1997 and from Yale University in 2009 with a Ph.D. in anthropology. She teaches at Skidmore College. Her research is focused on art and iconography, with a focus on Maya murals and Olmec rock art. She has studied the art and architecture of Bonampak, Copan, Holmul, Oxtotitlan, Palenque, Piedras Negras, San Bartolo, and Xultun.

Hurst has been an archaeological illustrator at sites in Honduras, Guatemala, and Mexico. Her illustrations have appeared in National Geographic and Arqueología Mexicana and have been exhibited at the Peabody Museum of Natural History and the National Gallery of Art, as well as the Science Museum of Minnesota's 2013 exhibit on the Maya.

She gave a talk: "Tres Pintores Magníficos y Un Viajero: La Identificación de Artistas por los Pasos de Producción en Pintura Mural" at the 2010 Maya Meetings, Casa Herrera. In 2013, she gave a talk on recently discovered Maya murals.

== Awards ==
- 2017 John Simon Guggenheim Memorial Foundation Fellowship
- 2013, 2015 Site Preservation Award, Archaeological Institute of America
- 2004 MacArthur Fellows Program
