= Fillia Makedon =

Greek-American computer scientist

Fillia S. Makedon is a Greek-American computer scientist whose research has spanned a broad variety of areas in computer science, including VLSI design, graph algorithms, numerical linear algebra, sensor networks, algorithm visualization, bioinformatics, recommender systems, and human–robot interaction. She is Jenkins-Garrett Professor of Computer Science and Engineering at the University of Texas at Arlington.

== Early life and education ==
Makedon is originally from Samos, and came to the US as a Fulbright Scholar to study biochemistry at Skidmore College, graduating in 1968. After a master's degree in biophysics at Penn State York in 1971, she shifted to graduate study in computer science at Northwestern University, earning a second master's degree in 1979 and completing her Ph.D. in 1982. Her doctoral advisor is Gilbert Krulee.

== Career ==
She was a postdoctoral researcher with Christos Papadimitriou at the National Technical University of Athens, and joined the faculty at the Illinois Institute of Technology in 1983. She moved to the University of Texas at Dallas in 1985, and in the same year took up an affiliate faculty position with the University of Patras. At UT Dallas, she founded the Computer Learning Research Center (CLEAR) in 1987.

She moved to Dartmouth College in 1991, as a professor of computer science, director of the Dartmouth Experimental Visualization Laboratory (DEVLAB), and director of the Summer Institute for Advanced Graduate Studies (DAGS), at the same time holding an adjunct position at the University of the Aegean. She became a program director in the Office of Cyber-Infrastructure at the National Science Foundation in 2005, and returned to academia with her present position as Jenkins-Garrett Professor at the University of Texas at Arlington in 2006. At UT Arlington, she became the founding director of the Integrative Computational Science Program, director of the Human Centered Computing Laboratory (HERACLEIA), and headed the department of computer science and engineering from 2006 to 2013.

== Selected publications ==
- Leighton, Frank Thomson; Makedon, Fillia; Plotkin, Serge A.; Stein, Clifford; Tardos, Éva; Tragoudas, Spyros (1995), "Fast approximation algorithms for multicommodity flow problems", Journal of Computer and System Sciences, 50 (2): 228–243, doi:10.1006/jcss.1995.1020, hdl:1813/8862
- Owen, Charles B.; Makedon, Fillia (1999), Computed Synchronization for Multimedia Applications, Springer International Series in Engineering and Computer Science, vol. 513, Springer, doi:10.1007/978-1-4757-4830-7, ISBN 978-1-4757-4830-7
- Wang, Y.; Makedon, F. S.; Ford, J. C.; Pearlman, J. (December 2004), "HykGene: a hybrid approach for selecting marker genes for phenotype classification using microarray gene expression data", Bioinformatics, 21 (8): 1530–1537, doi:10.1093/bioinformatics/bti192, PMID 15585531
- Zhang, Sheng; Wang, Weihong; Ford, James; Makedon, Fillia (2006), "Learning from incomplete ratings using non-negative matrix factorization", in Ghosh, Joydeep; Lambert, Diane; Skillicorn, David B.; Srivastava, Jaideep (eds.), Proceedings of the Sixth SIAM International Conference on Data Mining, April 20-22, 2006, Bethesda, MD, USA, Society for Industrial and Applied Mathematics, pp. 549–553, doi:10.1137/1.9781611972764.58, ISBN 978-0-89871-611-5
- Doukas, Charalampos; Metsis, Vangelis; Becker, Eric; Le, Zhengyi; Makedon, Fillia; Maglogiannis, Ilias (August 2011), "Digital cities of the future: Extending @home assistive technologies for the elderly and the disabled", Telematics and Informatics, 28 (3): 176–190, doi:10.1016/j.tele.2010.08.001
