= Jamienne S. Studley =

First female president of Skidmore College

Jamienne S. Studley was the president and CEO of the WASC Senior College and University Commission (WSCUC), a regional accrediting agency serving a diverse membership of public and private higher education institutions throughout California, Hawaii, and the Pacific, as well as a limited number of institutions outside the U.S.

Studley served under President Barack Obama as the deputy under secretary for the U.S. Department of Education from September 2013 to January 2016. She was the first female president of Skidmore College in Saratoga Springs, New York.

== Career ==
Throughout her career in higher education leadership and policy, public service, civil rights advocacy, and nonprofit management, Studley has worked to advance equity, opportunity, public engagement, and transparency.

In 2017, Studley was named the new president and CEO of the WASC Senior College and University Commission (WSCUC), a role she has held since January 2018. WSCUC Chair Dr. Reed Dasenbrock made the announcement following unanimous decision by the Commission.

Previously, Ms. Studley was deputy under secretary of the U.S. Department of Education during the Obama administration from 2013 to 2016. She also acted during vacancies in the positions of under secretary and assistant secretary for postsecondary education. Ms. Studley served on and chaired the National Advisory Committee on Institutional Quality and Integrity (NACIQI) from 2008 to 2013. Earlier Ms. Studley was the department's deputy and then acting general counsel from 1993 to 1999.

Studley has served in a number of higher education roles, notably as the first female president of Skidmore College and Associate Dean & Lecturer in Law at Yale Law School. She has also been professor of practice (public policy), Mills College; adjunct faculty, UC Berkeley and Stanford Law Schools; board member, Association of American Colleges & Universities; and Visiting Committee, Harvard Law School.

Studley has also served as National Policy Advisor for Beyond 12 and an independent consultant on institutional effectiveness, accreditation, and leadership.

== Nonprofit leadership ==
Studley's nonprofit leadership experience includes CEO and now President Emerita of Public Advocates Inc. and executive director of the National Association for Law Placement.

She serves on the boards of KQED and the Foundation for Student Success. Her past civic and volunteer activities have included chair of the San Francisco Ethics Commission and Connecticut Women's Education and Legal Fund; co-chair, California Civil Rights Coalition; co-founder, Washington Area Women's Foundation and Collectors of Wood Art, and board member, SF Education Fund, Mills College, American Craft Council, and Museum of Craft and Design (SF).

== Personal life ==
Studley is a graduate of Barnard College (magna cum laude and Phi Beta Kappa) and Harvard Law School.

She and her husband live in the San Francisco Bay Area in California.
