= Skidmore College =

Private college in Saratoga Springs, New York, US

Coordinates: 43°05′52″N 73°47′07″W

- Seal of Skidmore College
- Former names: Young Women's Industrial Club (1903–1911); Skidmore School of Arts (1911–1922)
- Motto: Scuto amoris divini (Latin)
- Motto in English: Under the shield of divine love (Note: This is a play on the name of Skidmore (scuto amoris sounds like "Skidmore").)
- Type: Private liberal arts college
- Established: 1903; 123 years ago (as the Young Women's Industrial Club), 1911 (as Skidmore School of the Arts), 1922 (as Skidmore College)
- Academic affiliations: CLAC; Annapolis Group; Oberlin Group
- Endowment: $528 million (2025)
- President: Marc C. Conner
- Faculty: 378
- Students: 2,855 (2024)
- Location: Saratoga Springs, New York, U.S.
- Campus: 850 acres (340 ha)
- Colors: Green & yellow
- Nickname: Thoroughbreds ("T-Breds")
- Sporting affiliations: NCAA Division III – Liberty League
- Mascot: Thoroughbreds
- Website: skidmore.edu
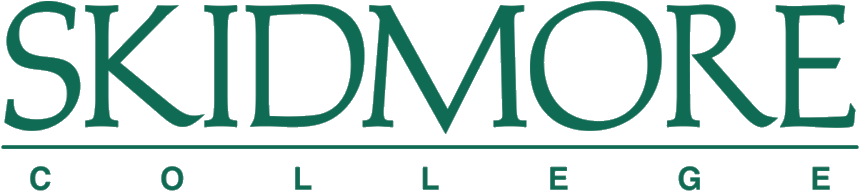

Skidmore College is a private liberal arts college in Saratoga Springs, New York. Approximately 2,700 students are enrolled at Skidmore pursuing a Bachelor of Arts or Bachelor of Science degree in one of more than 60 areas of study.

The college originated from a women's industrial club that was founded by Lucy Skidmore Scribner in 1903 and chartered as a school in 1911. In 1922 it grew into Skidmore College, a baccalaureate-degree-granting institution. In the late 1960s, the college moved from downtown Saratoga Springs to a newly constructed campus on the city's northern border. After a half-century as a women's college, Skidmore became coeducational in 1971.

== History ==
Skidmore College has undergone many transformations since its founding in the early 20th century as a women's college. The Young Women's Industrial Club was formed in 1903 by Lucy Ann Skidmore (1853–1931) with inheritance money from her husband, who died in 1879, and from her father, Joseph Russell Skidmore (1821–1882), a former coal merchant. In 1911, the club was chartered under the name Skidmore School of Arts as a college to vocationally and professionally train young women. The school's board of regents finally permitted the granting of baccalaureate degrees in 1922, and the school subsequently changed names to the current Skidmore College.

Skidmore College was initially established with a campus in downtown Saratoga Springs. In 1961, the college board approved a move to what would become the new Jonsson Campus: 850 acres on the outer edges of Saratoga Springs, which had been purchased for the college by Skidmore trustee Erik Jonsson, the founder and president of Texas Instruments and the future mayor of Dallas, Texas. Jonsson Tower on the new campus bears his name. The first buildings on the modern campus opened in 1966, and the college gradually moved all operations to the new location.

In 1971, Skidmore began admitting men to its regular undergraduate program. (A few male World War II veterans had been admitted in the mid-1940s.) In 1971 Skidmore also launched the University Without Walls (UWW) program, which allowed nonresident students over age 25 to earn bachelor's degrees. That program ended in 2012.

In 2020, Marc C. Conner became the college's eighth president, replacing Philip A. Glotzbach, who had served as president since 2003.

=== Presidents ===
1. Charles Henry Keyes, 1912–1925
2. Henry T. Moore, 1925–1957
3. Val H. Wilson, 1957–1965
4. Joseph C. Palamountain Jr., 1965–1987
5. David H. Porter, 1987–1999
6. Jamienne S. Studley, 1999–2003
7. Philip A. Glotzbach, 2003–2020
8. Marc C. Conner, 2020–present

== Academics ==
Skidmore offers 44 undergraduate majors, an average class size of 16, and more than 1,000 courses. The World Languages and Literatures Department offers classes in six languages and self-instructional coursework in five additional languages.

In the 2023–2024 school year, 640 bachelor's degrees were awarded in the following departments:

- Area, Ethnic, Cultural, Gender, and Group Studies (11)
- Biological and Biomedical Sciences (69)
- Business, Management, and Marketing (104)
- Computer and Information Sciences (23)
- Education (10)
- English Language and Literature/Letters (50)
- Foreign Languages, Literatures, and Linguistics (13)
- History (15)
- Liberal Arts and Sciences, General Studies, and Humanities (4)
- Mathematics and Statistics (11)
- Natural Resources and Conservation (38)
- Philosophy and Religious Studies (15)
- Physical Sciences (26)
- Psychology (83)
- Public Administration and Social Service Professions (17)
- Social Sciences (98)
- Visual and Performing Arts (64)

Students are also encouraged to take their education outside of the classroom with internships. These can be taken for credit and can be completed throughout the academic year; nearly 85% of students participate in an internship during their Skidmore career. Opportunities for these internships are highly publicized both by the departments themselves and by the career center. Due to the definition of degrees by New York State, Skidmore cannot accredit all departments with a Bachelor's of Science. A B.S. is given to those students majoring in art (studio), dance, dance-theater, education, exercise science, business, social work, and theater. The distinction rests in the number of hours of "non-liberal arts" courses allowed toward the 120 credit hours needed for graduation, 60 for a B.S. and 30 for a B.A. These "non-liberal arts"-designated courses are considered by the college to be of a professional nature.

=== Rankings and reputation ===
Academic rankings

Liberal arts
- U.S. News & World Report: 36
- Washington Monthly: 46

National
- Forbes: 122
- WSJ/College Pulse: 102

Skidmore is considered one of the Hidden Ivies according to Greenes' Guides to Educational Planning (2000). The college was ranked as the 36th best national liberal arts college in the 2025 rankings of U.S. News & World Report. The 2020 Wall Street Journal/Times Higher Education ranking of U.S. colleges and universities placed Skidmore at 93rd. For its 2025 America's Top Colleges list, Forbes rated Skidmore 122nd overall, and 30th among liberal arts universities. In 2024, Washington Monthly ranked Skidmore 46th among 194 liberal arts colleges in the U.S. based on its contribution to the public good, as measured by social mobility, research, and promoting public service.

== Admissions ==
The number of new students enrolling in the fall of 2023 (for the class of 2027) was 735. There had been 12,144 total applications for the class of 2027, with a 23% acceptance rate and a yield rate (the percentage of accepted students who enroll) of 27%. For submitted standardized tests, the middle 50% ranges were 1320–1440 for the SAT and 30–33 for the ACT.

== Financial aid ==
Skidmore is need-aware and meets 100% of demonstrated financial need for all accepted students. In 2024, CNBC listed it as one of "The 10 U.S. colleges that offer the best financial aid," citing the Princeton Review. In 2023-2024, 57% of students received grant or scholarship aid, with an average aid award of $52,323, and the average net price was $31,187.

== Campus and facilities ==
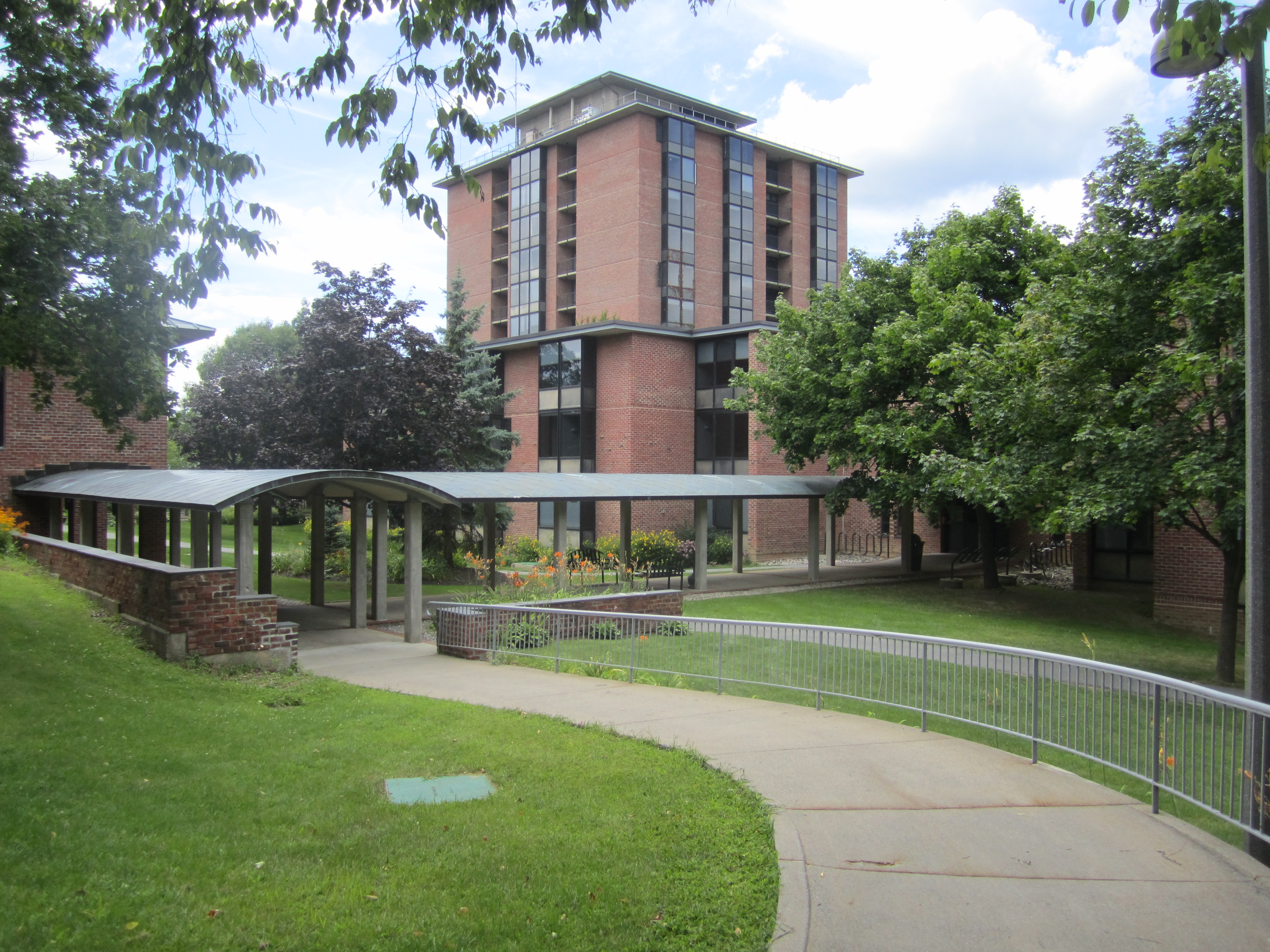
Jonsson Tower

Most humanities classes are held in one of four academic buildings: Palamountain, Tisch, Bolton, and Ladd. The Billie Tisch Center for Integrated Sciences houses math, computer science, geology, chemistry, physics, and biology.

Skidmore's average class size is 16 students; 94% of classes have fewer than 30 students. The student body comes from 44 U.S. states and more than 60 countries. About 90% of students live on campus. The college has around 100 student clubs and organizations, including athletic teams, arts groups, an honor society, and community-service clubs.

In 2020, Skidmore broke ground on the 200,000-square-foot Billie Tisch Center for Integrated Sciences, a complex housing 10 Skidmore science departments and programs, 46 research labs, and a maker space for students and faculty, as well as a site-specific 165-foot sculpture by artist Alyson Shotz. The complex, which was completed in 2024, is named in honor of trustee and donor Wilma "Billie" Tisch, a 1948 graduate.

In 2025, Skidmore opened the McCaffery-Wagman Tennis and Wellness Center, a complex housing Health Services, Counseling Services, a cardio fitness room, a weight room, group fitness studios, and indoor and outdoor tennis courts.

The Frances Young Tang Teaching Museum and Art Gallery is among the college's main arts facilities. In addition to the Tang, Skidmore has undergraduate studio space as well as several smaller galleries. The Saisselin Art Building houses studios for animation, ceramics, communication design, drawing, fibers, metals, painting, photography, printmaking, and sculpture. Skidmore has a music program housed in the Arthur Zankel Music Center, which contains a large concert hall and facilities.

=== The Frances Young Tang Teaching Museum and Art Gallery ===
The Frances Young Tang Teaching Museum and Art Gallery was opened in 2000, and was designed by the architect Antoine Predock. Predock's design includes two major gallery wings (the Wachenheim Gallery and the Malloy Wing), two smaller galleries (the State Farm Mezzanine and the Winter Gallery), digitally equipped classrooms, and several event spaces. The Tang is nationally known for both its architecture and its holdings, and its excellence has been recognized by The New York Times, Art in America, and Architectural Digest, among other publications. The Tang receives roughly 40,000 visitors annually. The Tang recently hosted a retrospective of the work of Alma Thomas in partnership with the Studio Museum in Harlem.

== Student life ==
=== The Student Government Association ===
The Student Government Association (SGA) is the official governing body of students at Skidmore College. It aims to implement programs, events, and policies that establish and maintain high standards of community life, academic scholarship, responsible citizenship, and personal growth. In addition to serving as the official liaison between students and the college administration, the SGA is also responsible for providing events and entertainment for the student body, as well as funding and regulating the approximately 90 student-run clubs and organizations on campus.

=== Publications ===
==== Salmagundi ====
Salmagundi is a quarterly journal that focuses on the humanities and social sciences. Founded by Robert Boyers, a long-time faculty member in the English department, it has been published at Skidmore since 1969 and now has an international subscriber base of several thousand readers.

Nadine Gordimer, J. M. Coetzee, Tzvetan Todorov, George Steiner, Orlando Patterson, Norman Manea, Christopher Hitchens, Seamus Heaney, Mary Gordon, Susan Sontag, Benjamin Barber, Joyce Carol Oates, Richard Howard, Carolyn Forche, Martin Jay, and David Rieff are among the writers who have contributed to Salmagundi. Regular columnists include Benjamin Barber, Tzvetan Todorov, Martin Jay, Charles Molesworth, Marilynne Robinson, Carolyn Forché, and Mario Vargas Llosa.

==== The Skidmore News ====
The Skidmore News is the college's official student-run newspaper. Its staff is composed entirely of students, and it is published on a weekly basis during the academic year. In 2002, the Associated Collegiate Press awarded the newspaper first place for a four-year college weekly for special coverage of the community reaction to the September 11 attacks. In 2010, The Skidmore News stopped printing physical copies and moved entirely online.

==== The Skidmo' Daily ====
The Skidmo' Daily is the college's satirical publication. It was founded in 2013 by Jack Rosen '16, and its editorial board and staff are made up of students. Since July 2016 the paper has been posting content to its website, which includes web-exclusive content not found in the print editions, as well as an archive of print editions.

=== National College Comedy Festival ===
The National College Comedy Festival is an annual not-for-profit festival of student sketch and improvisational comedy that takes place each winter on campus. The festival, which first was held in February 1990, includes professional workshops. It was co-founded by David Miner '91.

=== Sustainability ===
Skidmore's Strategic Plan reflects the college's commitment to sustainability and includes a pledge to deepen connections with the local community, emphasize planning for sustainable operation, and reduce the college's environmental footprint. Three of Skidmore's buildings have geothermal heating and cooling systems, and the college has recently hired a sustainability coordinator to assist with efforts to "green" the campus. Skidmore received a grade of "B+" on the Sustainable Endowment Institute's "College Sustainability Report Card 2011."

== Athletics ==
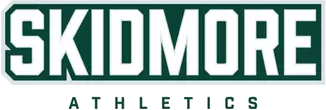
Skidmore athletics wordmark

Skidmore College's athletic teams, which are nicknamed the Thoroughbreds, compete in the National Collegiate Athletic Association (NCAA) Division III.

Skidmore's athletic department, run out of the Williamson Sports Center, currently funds and supports 19 varsity teams, including basketball, ice hockey, rowing and riding. Skidmore is a founding member of the Upstate Collegiate Athletic Association, which was renamed to the Liberty League in 2004. As of 2026, Skidmore has won 11 National Championships and 95 Conference Championships.

From 1973 until 1982, Skidmore athletic teams were nicknamed the "Wombats". In 1982, the team nickname was changed to "Thoroughbreds" because it was felt that the wombat "lacked the image of an athlete."

== In honor ==
- The SS Skidmore Victory (VC2-S-AP3), a World War II cargo ship, was named after the college. Victory ships (VC2) were a class of cargo ship produced in large numbers by American shipyards to replace losses caused by German submarines.
- In 2016, Saratoga Race Course named an annual race after the college. The Skidmore is run by 2-year-olds every August on turf at 5 1/2 furlongs.

== Notable alumni ==
Some notable Skidmore graduates include MacArthur Fellows Elizabeth LeCompte and Heather Hurst; Cornell Law School dean Jens David Ohlin; longtime Vogue editor-in-chief Grace Mirabella; television producer David Miner; oceanographer Sallie Chisholm; philanthropist Wilma "Billie" Tisch; political operative Anne Wexler; business executives Cynthia Carroll, Oskar Ibru, and Carlie Irsay-Gordon; journalist Arwa Damon; actors Zazie Beetz, Justin Henry, and Michael Zegen; dancers Sybil Shearer and Robert Tracy; historian Judith Flanders; computer scientist Fillia Makedon; game designer Zach Gage; cookbook authors Helen Corbitt and Molly Baz; comedian Chris Fleming; early nutritionist Hazel Stiebeling; musicians Evan Mast and Mike Stroud of Ratatat; artists Grace DeGennaro and Glenda Arentzen; biophysicist and health policy expert Ruby Puryear Hearn; environmentalist Céline Cousteau; and film and TV composer Nathan Barr.

Skidmore attendees have included film director Jason Reitman; actors Jon Bernthal and Lake Bell; musician Evan Dando; and Ben Cohen, co-founder of Ben & Jerry's.

== See also ==
- WSPN, a radio station owned by the college
