= 2010 Emory Healthcare 500 =

Race details
- Race 25 of 36 in the 2010 NASCAR Sprint Cup Series
- The 2010 Emory Healthcare 500 program cover, celebrating the 50th anniversary of Atlanta Motor Speedway. Artwork by Sam Bass.
- Date: September 5, 2010
- Location: Atlanta Motor Speedway, Hampton, Georgia
- Course: Permanent racing facility
- Course length: 1.54 miles (2.48 km)
- Distance: 325 laps, 500.5 mi (805.5 km)
- Weather: Partly cloudy with a high around 84; wind out of the NE at 4 mph. Chance of precipitation: 0%.
- Average speed: 129.039 miles per hour (207.668 km/h)

Pole position
Driver	Denny Hamlin	Joe Gibbs Racing
- Time: 29.587

Most laps led
Driver	Tony Stewart	Stewart Haas Racing
- Laps: 175

Winner
No. 14	Tony Stewart	Stewart Haas Racing

Television in the United States
- Network: ESPN
- Announcers: Marty Reid, Dale Jarrett and Andy Petree

The 2010 Emory Healthcare 500 was a NASCAR Sprint Cup Series race that was held on September 5, 2010, at Atlanta Motor Speedway in Hampton, Georgia. Contested over 325 laps, it was the twenty-fifth race of the 2010 Sprint Cup Series season. The race was won by Tony Stewart, for the Stewart–Haas Racing team. Carl Edwards finished second, and Jimmie Johnson, who started seventh, clinched third.

Pole position driver Denny Hamlin maintained his lead on the first lap to begin the race, as Ryan Newman, who started in the second position remained behind him. Afterward, Newman became the leader. On lap 128, Hamlin had an engine failure, finishing forty-third. Later in the race, Tony Stewart led a race-high of seventy-five laps. Stewart retained the first position on a final restart to clinch his third win at Atlanta Motor Speedway.

The race logo for the 2010 Emory Healthcare 500.

There were eight cautions and twenty-seven lead changes among nine different drivers throughout the course of the race. It was Tony Stewart's first win of the season and the thirty-eighth of his career. The result moved him up two spots to fourth in the Drivers' Championship, 283 points behind of leader Kevin Harvick and fourteen ahead of Carl Edwards. Chevrolet maintained its lead in the Manufacturers' Championship, thirty-two ahead of Toyota and sixty-six ahead of Ford, with eleven races remaining in the season. A total of 93,200 people attended the race, while 5.516 million watched it on television.

== Report ==
=== Background ===
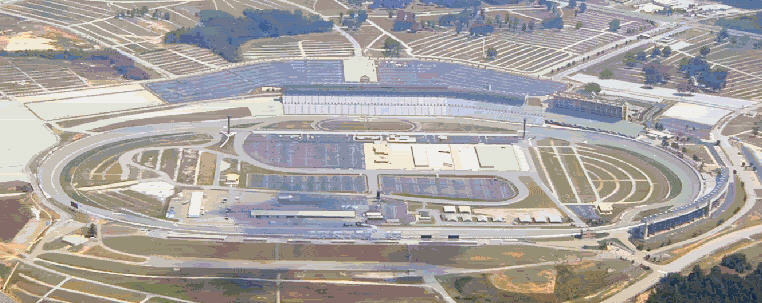
Atlanta Motor Speedway, the race track where the race was held.

Atlanta Motor Speedway is one of ten intermediate tracks to hold NASCAR races. The standard track at Atlanta Motor Speedway is a four-turn quad-oval track that is 1.54 miles (2.48 km) long. The track's turns are banked at twenty-four degrees, while the front stretch, the location of the finish line, and the back stretch are banked at five.

Before the race, Kevin Harvick led the Drivers' Championship with 3,521 points, and Jeff Gordon stood in second with 3,242 points. Kyle Busch was third in the Drivers' Championship with 3,170 points, Carl Edwards was fourth with 3,113 points, and Denny Hamlin was in fifth with 3,108 points. In the Manufacturers' Championship, Chevrolet was leading with 173 points, twenty-seven points ahead of their rival Toyota. Ford, with 110 points, was eleven points ahead of Dodge in the battle for third. Kasey Kahne was the race's defending champion.

=== Practice and qualifying ===
Two practice sessions were held on Saturday, prior to the race. The first session lasted 120 minutes, while the second session was 45 minutes. During the first practice session, Kasey Kahne was quickest, ahead of Kurt Busch and Clint Bowyer in second and third. Jeff Burton was scored fourth quickest, while Denny Hamlin was fifth. In the second and final practice session, Ryan Newman was scored quickest, as Carl Edwards and Juan Pablo Montoya followed in the second and third positions. David Ragan was scored in the fourth position, while Bowyer followed in fifth.

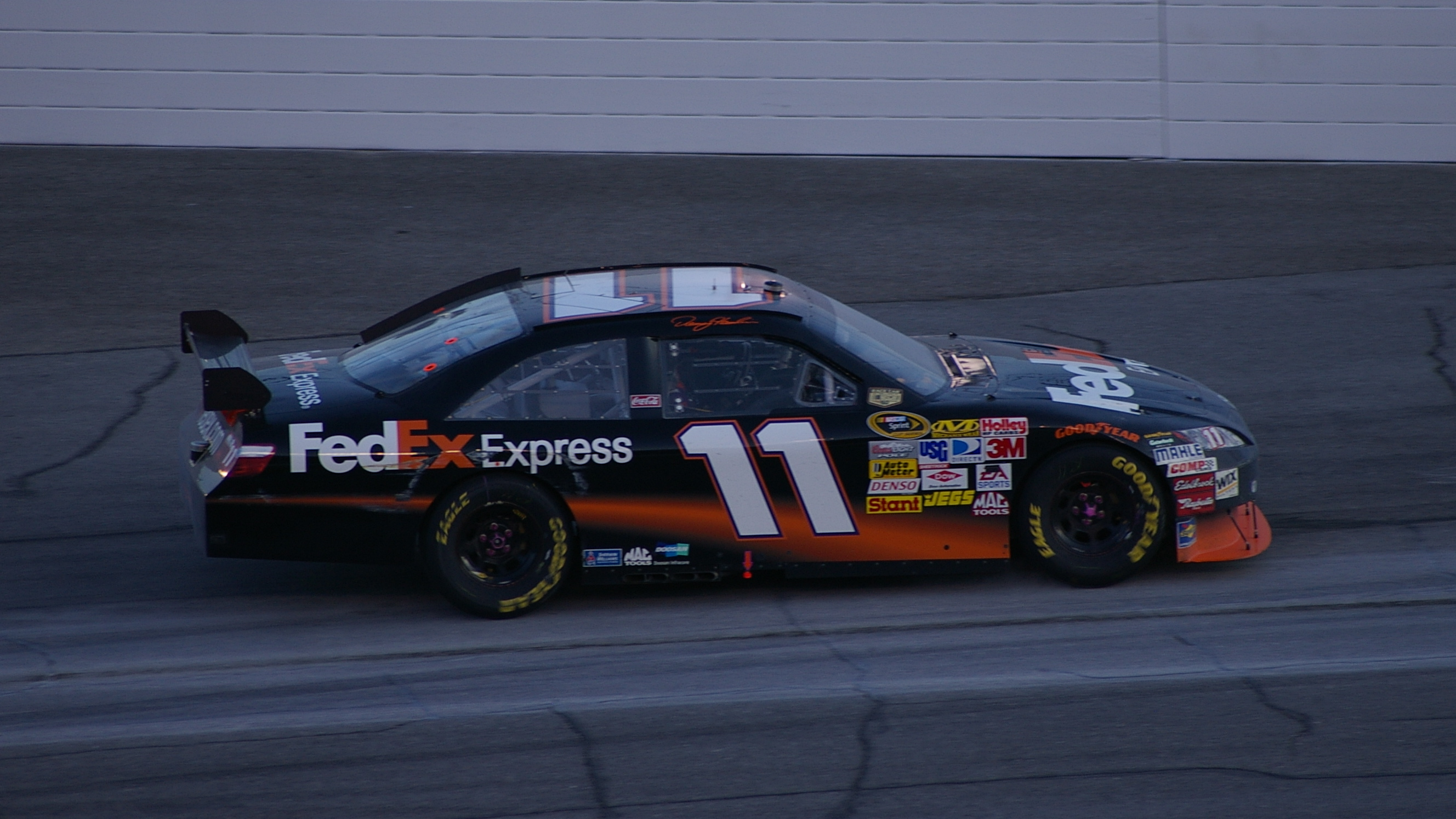
Denny Hamlin clinched his eighth career pole position, with a time of 29.587 seconds.

During qualifying, forty-seven cars were entered, but only forty-three were able to start because of NASCAR's qualifying procedure. Denny Hamlin clinched his eighth career pole position, with a time of 29.587 seconds. He was joined on the front row by Newman. Kyle Busch qualified third, Edwards took fourth, and Tony Stewart started fifth. The four drivers that failed to qualify for the race were Jason Leffler, Landon Cassill, Scott Riggs, and Todd Bodine.

After winning the pole position, Hamlin stated, "I feel like the last 10 races have definitely been up and down for our team," he said. "We were on such a hot streak there. We kind of got spoiled. The regular season was kind of irrelevant at that point because we knew we were going to get in the Chase. We're going to treat these next two weeks as if we're Chase racing. We found ourselves going for wins so much, going all-out for wins, that it probably hurt us in the long run. These next two weeks, we're going back to points racing."

=== Race ===
The race, the twenty-fifth in the season, began at 7:30 pm EDT and was televised live in the United States on ESPN. Before the race, conditions were sunny with a temperature of 85 °F (29 °C). Joe Gibbs began the pre-race ceremonies, by giving the invocation. Next, Ernie Haase & Signature Sound performed the national anthem, and Terry Green, Emory Healthcare's 500th heart transplant recipient, gave the command for drivers to start their engines.

Denny Hamlin retained his pole position lead into the first corner, followed by Ryan Newman in the second position. Newman was challenging Hamlin, on the first lap. Tony Stewart maintained his starting position of fifth on the grid, as Jimmie Johnson was seventh. Kyle Busch was passed by Carl Edwards, two laps later. After starting seventeenth, Mark Martin had fallen to twenty-seventh by the sixth lap. Busch reclaimed third, passing Edwards, one lap later. After eight laps of continuous racing, Hamlin had a lead of eight tenths of a second, as Johnson moved to fifth. Martin, then fell to thirtieth because of car handling problems. On lap 13, Johnson, followed by Stewart, moved into the fourth and fifth positions, after passing Edwards.

Two laps later, Newman passed Hamlin for the lead . Juan Pablo Montoya claimed the tenth position, as Jeff Gordon fell to eleventh. On lap 23, Greg Biffle was scored twelfth, Gordon was fourteenth, and Kurt Busch, who won here in the 2010 Kobalt Tools 500, was running in the twenty-third position. Hamlin moved back into the lead position from passing Newman. After thirty laps of green flag racing, lap times fell considerably because of tire wear. On the same lap, Kyle Busch, who started third, passed Newman for second. On lap 39, Michael McDowell and Joe Nemechek drove their cars to the garage, as Hamlin had a 1.9 second lead over Kyle Busch in second. Mike Bliss followed Nemechek and McDowell into the garage two laps later.

On lap 44, green flag pit stops began, as Sam Hornish Jr. drove to pit road. Five laps later, Hamlin and Kyle Busch, who were first and second, made their pit stops. Kyle Busch became the leader, but because of excessive speed on pit road, he had to serve a drive-through penalty. Afterward, Stewart became the leader, as J. J. Yeley drove his car to the garage. On lap 55, Hamlin passed Stewart for the first position. Once green flag pit stops were completed, Hamlin was in first, followed by Stewart, Truex Jr., Kahne, and Newman to round out the top five positions. Kahne, who started tenth, moved Truex Jr. from the third position to fourth, after passing him on lap 62. Two laps later, Stewart passed Hamlin to move into the first position.

On lap 70, Kyle Busch drove to pit road, because of a loose wheel. Six laps later, Ryan Newman fell two positions to eleventh, after being passed by Paul Menard and Kevin Harvick. Afterward on lap 80, Edwards passed Kahne to move into the third position. Five laps later, Menard moved to seventh on the grid, after passing Biffle. Afterwards, more green flag pit stops began. On lap 88, Stewart, who was the leader, was passed by Hamlin. Three laps later, Stewart reclaimed the lead. Stewart only led three laps until he returned the lead to Hamlin for one lap. Stewart pitted on lap 97, as pit stops continued. Afterward, Stewart remained first, ahead of Hamlin, Edwards, Truex, and Kahne.

On lap 127, Hamlin reclaimed the lead, as debris in turn four prompted the caution out. Hamlin led on the restart, but three laps later, he fell to fifth, as Edwards claimed the lead. Hamlin, who started on the pole position, went to the garage, as his engine failed, which prompted the second caution. Stewart regained the lead after pit stops completed. Immediately after the restart, Biffle spun sideways, and collided with Elliott Sadler to bring out the third caution. Both obtained excessive damage, and went to the garage for repairs. Stewart remained the leader on the restart, but was overtaken by Johnson. Kyle Busch, who was a lap down after his drive-through penalty, had recovered to sixth. One lap later, Gordon moved into the sixth position, after passing Busch.

On lap 170, Stewart passed Johnson to move into the first position. After struggling with car handling during the first half of the race, Kurt Busch had moved from thirty-second to sixteenth by lap 171. Seven laps later, Jamie McMurray had a flat tire, and drove to pit road, which caused him to fall to the twenty-sixth position. By lap 182, Stewart had a 2.1 second lead over Johnson in second place. On lap 191, Kevin Harvick moved into the fourth position, as Stewart puts his teammate, Ryan Newman, a lap down. Eight laps later, the fourth caution came out as David Ragan spun sideways on the back stretch. Every driver in the lead lap pitted under the caution. Stewart retained the first position on the restart. On the restart, drivers were racing furiously, by going three wide (three cars side-by-side) around the track. On lap 207, Johnson claimed second away from Edwards, as Gordon fell to the eighth position.

Montoya, who started eighth, passed Kyle Busch for fourth, three laps later. On lap 222, Montoya moved into the third position, as Johnson showed his displeasure from the previous race with him with a hand gesture. One lap later, Biffle returned to the race, seventy-one laps down in the thirty-ninth position, but would lose power to his race car after four laps. After 229 laps, Stewart had a 3.9 second lead over second placed Edwards. Eleven laps later, Johnson fell to the fifth position, after being passed by Kyle Busch. On lap 243, Menard drove to pit road because of engine problems. Three laps later, Harvick moved into fifth, after passing Johnson. Then, Edwards passed Stewart to become the leader of the race. Four laps later, Edwards was on pit road, as debris from Harvick's race car, after a tire flat, prompted the fifth caution. On lap 256, Harvick drove to pit road to repair his front bumper of his race car.

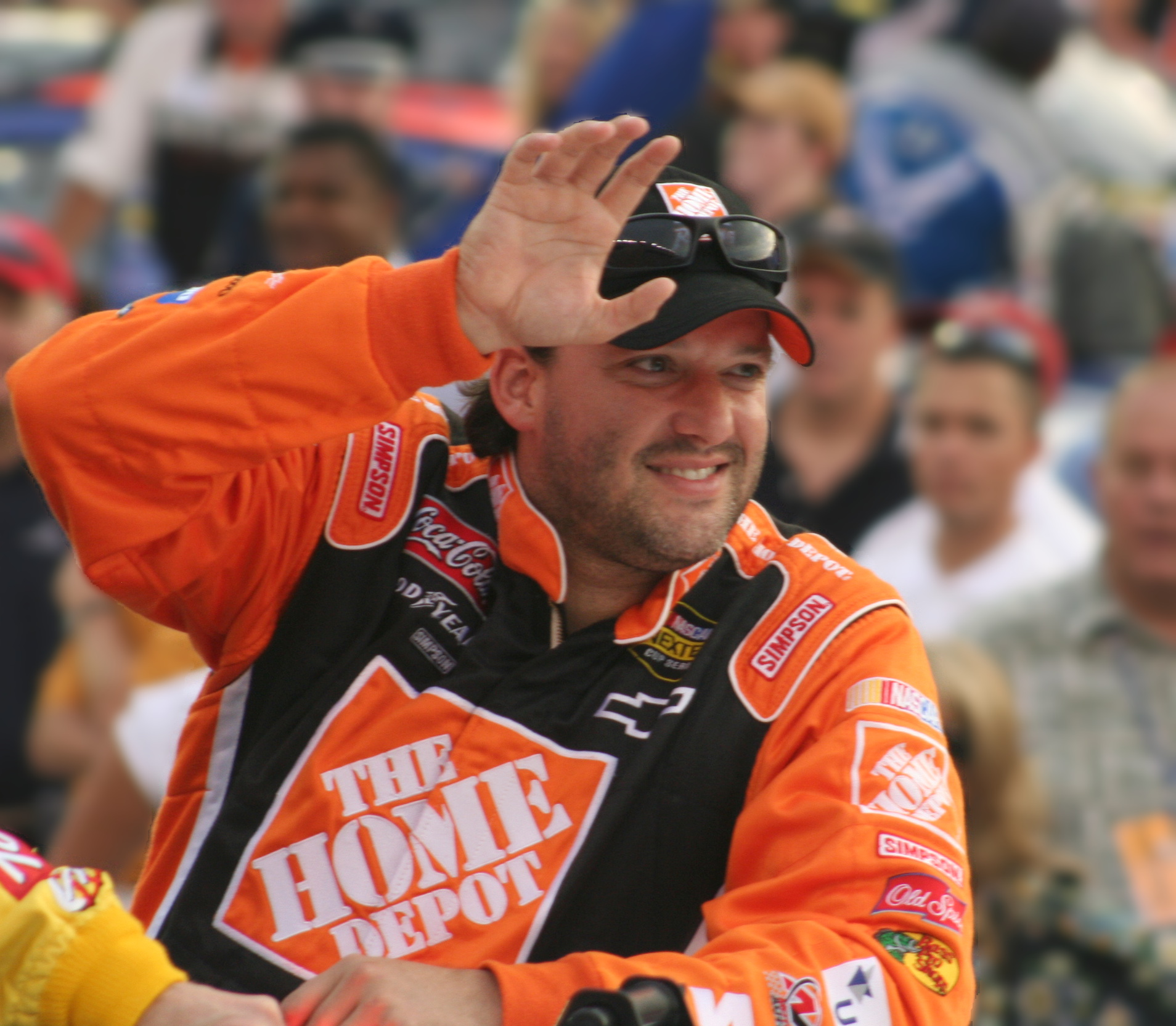
Tony Stewart won the race, and led a race high of 175 laps.

After Harvick drove through pit road the first time, it caused a scoring error, so he was held a lap to fix it. Edwards led on the restart, but within two laps Scott Speed had an engine failure to bring out the sixth caution. Kurt Busch stayed off pit road during the caution to become the leader. Five laps later, on lap 280, Kahne passed Kurt Busch for the first position. One lap later, Johnson passed Kyle Busch for the fourth position. On lap 283, Edwards, followed by Johnson, passed Kurt Busch for second and third. Nine laps later, Stewart passed Kyle Busch for the fifth position. Three laps later, Brad Keselowski collided with the outside wall hard enough to bring out the caution.

Edwards became the leader after the pit stops, but one lap after the restart, Stewart reclaimed the lead, as Kurt Busch and Kasey Kahne collided. On lap 302, the eighth caution was given because Kahne's tire deflated. The restart was on lap 307, with Stewart the leader. Three laps later, Kevin Harvick returned to pit road, as Jeff Burton passed Kurt Busch for fifth. On lap 314, Kyle passed his brother Kurt Busch for sixth. By lap 316, Stewart had a 1.2 second lead over Edwards. With three laps remaining, Kahne showed his anger with Newman, after the contact that sent him collided into Kurt Busch. Tony Stewart crossed the line to win the race, over a second ahead of second place Carl Edwards. Jimmie Johnson maintained third while Jeff Burton and Kyle Busch finished fourth and fifth.

=== Post-race ===
"It was just a really good night overall for the entire Stewart Haas organization, just a lot of hard work we have put in over the last few months just trying to get back to where we feel like we could win a race. We had good Top 5, Top 10 cars but just we were not able to get to victory lane. Tonight we had all the pieces together. We unloaded fast this weekend and Tony did an incredible job qualifying, starting up front makes all the difference in the world and good pit stalls and being able to help the guys out, all things combined, it was a good effort."

— Darian Grubb, speaking after the race.

Tony Stewart appeared in victory lane after his victory lap to start celebrating his first win of the season, and his third at Atlanta Motor Speedway, in front of a crowd of 93,200 people. After breaking a thirty-one race losing streak, Stewart stated on the team's radio, "Ring the bell baby, woo! Good job, guys! You got it done, that's the only way we had a shot. You guys won this thing in the pits." He also added, "I've never been so happy to win in my life."

Although, Denny Hamlin lead the most laps in the first half of the race, his engine failed, and sent him to the garage for the rest of the race. He said, "It’s frustrating. I know if we had the reliability that we could win this championship and the odds would be pretty good to win the championship if I can just keep it together for 10 weeks." In the subsequent press conference, Stewart said, "It’s been a long time since we have been in victory lane. So it’s something we are not used to; luckily, we have had the good fortune to not normally go this long without a win. But we had an awesome race car tonight. This thing, it was balanced off the start of the race, and you know, I knew the first run when we were a little bit off, and the leaders were not getting away from us, I thought, we have probably got a shot at this thing tonight and a shot at a solid Top 5 or Top 3, but once we got a couple of runs in there, and it was Denny and I trading spots back and forth." He continued by saying:

"It was fun racing with him like that. We gave each other room. Whoever got caught in traffic, the other guy got the lead back. It was fun switching the lead. We struggled on restarts or I struggled on restarts, Darian wasn’t driving the car, so I can’t blame it on him. I struggled on restarts all night. Finally the last two, I hit it a lot closer and kept them from spinning quite as bad. The pit crew is who we have got to give all the credit to tonight. They had an awesome pit stop the last time we came in that got us that track position that I lost on the previous restart. So you know, without that, I don’t think we would have a shot to be here tonight."

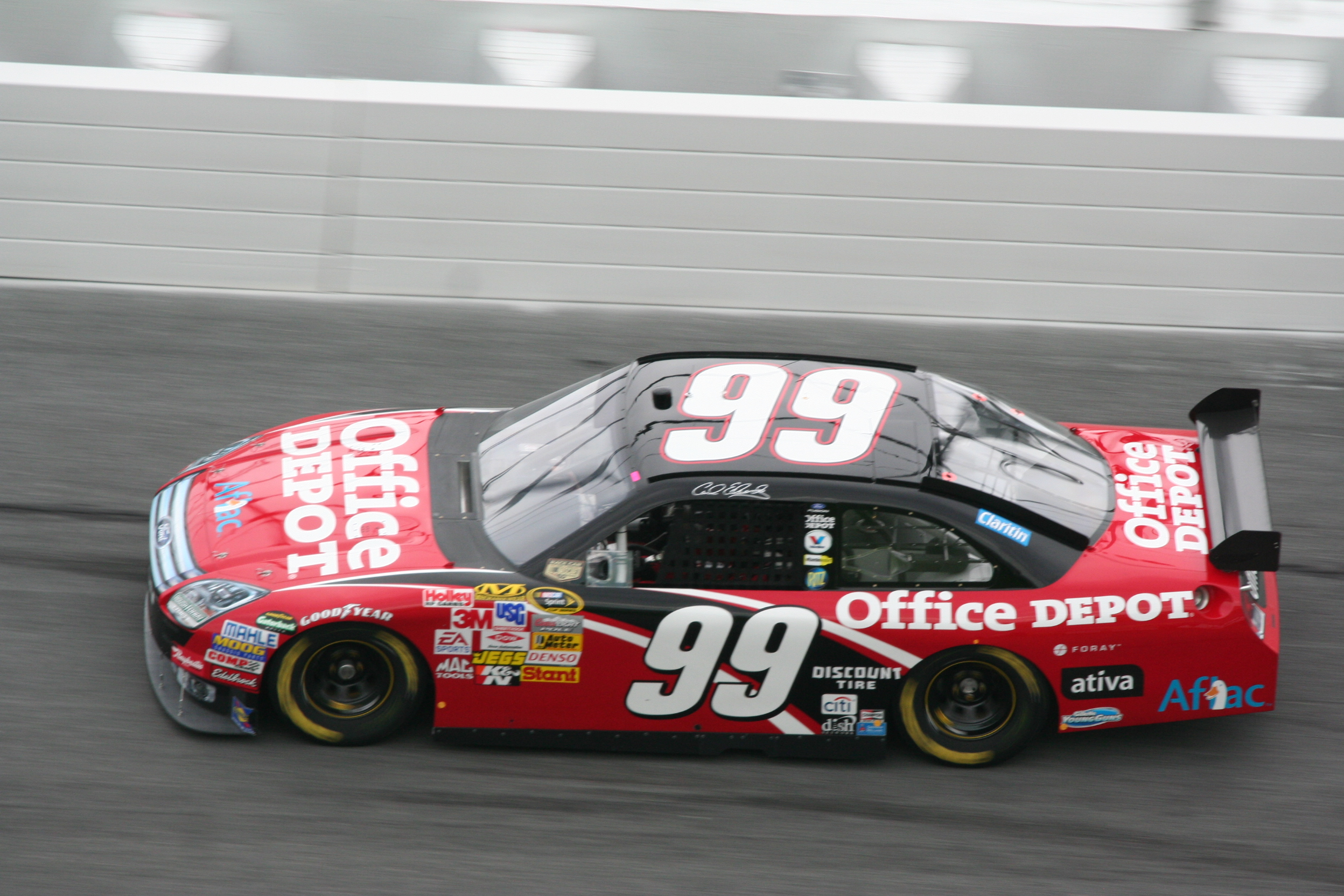
Carl Edwards finished in the second position during the race.

Ryan Newman discussed his contact with Kahne by explaining, "Yeah, the No. 18 (Kyle Busch) hit me the same time I hit the No. 9 (Kahne) — it was within a millisecond. I was trying to push him to get ahead of the No. 2 car (Kurt Busch) and it didn’t work out. We’ve seen this several times this year, and it was me trying to help him out. It causes accidents once in a while. It hurt him but in the grand scheme of things he tried to hurt me and it didn’t hurt us as bad. So, we’ll just go on." Stewart also stated, "When you have a car that’s that good, it’s not good to lose those spots like that. ... We got caught back there one time and we struggled getting that track position back. But when you have a car that’s that fast, it’s nice. You don’t feel like you’re in too much trouble when you lose a couple of spots on a restart like that."

The race result left Kevin Harvick leading the Driver's Championship with 3,585 points. Jeff Gordon, who finished thirteenth, was second on 3,366, forty-one points ahead of Kyle Busch and sixty-four ahead of Stewart. In the Manufacturers' Championship, Chevrolet maintained their lead with 182 points. Toyota remained second with 150 points. Ford followed with 116 points, fourteen points ahead of Dodge in fourth. 5.516 million people watched the race on television. The race took three hours, fifty-two minutes and forty-three seconds to complete, and the margin of victory was 1.316 seconds.

== Results ==
=== Qualifying ===
Grid	No.	Driver	Team	Manufacturer	Time	Speed
1	11	Denny Hamlin	Joe Gibbs Racing	Toyota	29.587	187.380
2	39	Ryan Newman	Stewart Haas Racing	Chevrolet	29.636	187.070
3	18	Kyle Busch	Joe Gibbs Racing	Toyota	29.637	187.064
4	99	Carl Edwards	Roush Fenway Racing	Ford	29.666	186.881
5	14	Tony Stewart	Stewart Haas Racing	Chevrolet	29.666	186.881
6	56	Martin Truex Jr.	Michael Waltrip Racing	Toyota	29.676	186.818
7	48	Jimmie Johnson	Hendrick Motorsports	Chevrolet	29.693	186.711
8	42	Juan Pablo Montoya	Earnhardt Ganassi Racing	Chevrolet	29.693	186.711
9	6	David Ragan	Roush Fenway Racing	Ford	29.696	186.692
10	9	Kasey Kahne	Richard Petty Motorsports	Ford	29.700	186.667
11	2	Kurt Busch	Penske Racing	Dodge	29.769	186.234
12	1	Jamie McMurray	Earnhardt Ganassi Racing	Chevrolet	29.779	186.171
13	00	David Reutimann	Michael Waltrip Racing	Toyota	29.786	186.128
14	33	Clint Bowyer	Richard Childress Racing	Chevrolet	29.800	186.040
15	16	Greg Biffle	Roush Fenway Racing	Ford	29.810	185.978
16	43	A. J. Allmendinger	Richard Petty Motorsports	Ford	29.811	185.972
17	5	Mark Martin	Hendrick Motorsports	Chevrolet	29.929	185.238
18	24	Jeff Gordon	Hendrick Motorsports	Chevrolet	29.982	184.911
19	98	Paul Menard	Richard Petty Motorsports	Ford	29.985	184.892
20	82	Scott Speed	Red Bull Racing Team	Toyota	30.007	184.757
21	77	Sam Hornish Jr.	Penske Racing	Dodge	30.012	184.726
22	19	Elliott Sadler	Richard Petty Motorsports	Ford	30.021	184.671
23	46	Michael McDowell	Whitney Motorsports	Chevrolet	30.032	184.603
24	71	Bobby Labonte	TRG Motorsports	Chevrolet	30.037	184.572
25	88	Dale Earnhardt Jr.	Hendrick Motorsports	Chevrolet	30.059	184.437
26	31	Jeff Burton	Richard Childress Racing	Chevrolet	30.060	184.431
27	78	Regan Smith	Furniture Row Racing	Chevrolet	30.076	184.333
28	12	Brad Keselowski	Penske Racing	Dodge	30.083	184.290
29	29	Kevin Harvick	Richard Childress Racing	Chevrolet	30.086	184.272
30	17	Matt Kenseth	Roush Fenway Racing	Ford	30.100	184.186
31	20	Joey Logano	Joe Gibbs Racing	Toyota	30.107	184.143
32	47	Marcos Ambrose	JTG Daugherty Racing	Toyota	30.121	184.058
33	83	Reed Sorenson	Red Bull Racing Team	Toyota	30.212	183.503
34	87	Joe Nemechek	NEMCO Motorsports	Toyota	30.279	183.097
35	26	Patrick Carpentier	Latitude 43 Motorsports	Ford	30.286	183.055
36	37	David Gilliland	Front Row Motorsports	Ford	30.288	183.043
37	38	Dave Blaney	Front Row Motorsports	Ford	30.298	182.982
38	36	J. J. Yeley	Tommy Baldwin Racing	Chevrolet	30.311	182.904
39	55	Mike Bliss	Prism Motorsports	Toyota	30.315	182.880
40	21	Bill Elliott	Wood Brothers Racing	Ford	30.398	182.380
41	34	Travis Kvapil	Front Row Motorsports	Ford	30.611	181.111
42	7	Kevin Conway	Robby Gordon Motorsports	Toyota	31.221	177.573
43	13	Casey Mears	Germain Racing	Toyota	30.407	182.326
Failed to qualify
	32	Jason Leffler	Braun Racing	Toyota	30.499	181.777
	09	Landon Cassill	Phoenix Racing	Chevrolet	30.535	181.562
	66	Scott Riggs	Prism Motorsports	Toyota	30.609	181.123
	64	Todd Bodine	Gunselman Motorsports	Toyota	30.625	181.029

=== Race results ===
Pos.	Grid	No.	Driver	Team	Manufacturer	Laps	Points
1	5	14	Tony Stewart	Stewart Haas Racing	Chevrolet	325	195^{2}
2	4	99	Carl Edwards	Roush Fenway Racing	Ford	325	175^{1}
3	7	48	Jimmie Johnson	Hendrick Motorsports	Chevrolet	325	170^{1}
4	26	31	Jeff Burton	Richard Childress Racing	Chevrolet	325	160
5	3	18	Kyle Busch	Joe Gibbs Racing	Toyota	325	155
6	11	2	Kurt Busch	Penske Racing	Dodge	325	155^{1}
7	14	33	Clint Bowyer	Richard Childress Racing	Chevrolet	325	146
8	2	39	Ryan Newman	Stewart Haas Racing	Chevrolet	325	147^{1}
9	8	42	Juan Pablo Montoya	Earnhardt Ganassi Racing	Chevrolet	325	138
10	32	47	Marcos Ambrose	JTG Daugherty Racing	Toyota	325	134
11	30	17	Matt Kenseth	Roush Fenway Racing	Ford	325	130
12	6	56	Martin Truex Jr.	Michael Waltrip Racing	Toyota	325	127
13	18	24	Jeff Gordon	Hendrick Motorsports	Chevrolet	325	124
14	33	83	Reed Sorenson	Red Bull Racing Team	Toyota	325	121
15	12	1	Jamie McMurray	Earnhardt Ganassi Racing	Chevrolet	325	118
16	13	00	David Reutimann	Michael Waltrip Racing	Toyota	325	115
17	27	78	Regan Smith	Furniture Row Racing	Chevrolet	325	112
18	16	43	A. J. Allmendinger	Richard Petty Motorsports	Ford	325	109
19	9	6	David Ragan	Roush Fenway Racing	Ford	325	106
20	36	37	David Gilliland	Front Row Motorsports	Ford	325	103
21	17	5	Mark Martin	Hendrick Motorsports	Chevrolet	325	100
22	25	88	Dale Earnhardt Jr.	Hendrick Motorsports	Chevrolet	325	97
23	40	21	Bill Elliott	Wood Brothers Racing	Ford	325	94
24	37	38	Dave Blaney	Front Row Motorsports	Ford	325	91
25	28	12	Brad Keselowski	Penske Racing	Dodge	324	88
26	43	13	Casey Mears	Germain Racing	Toyota	324	85
27	31	20	Joey Logano	Joe Gibbs Racing	Toyota	324	82
28	35	26	Patrick Carpentier	Latitude 43 Motorsports	Ford	323	79
29	41	34	Travis Kvapil	Front Row Motorsports	Ford	323	76
30	21	77	Sam Hornish Jr.	Penske Racing	Dodge	322	73
31	24	71	Bobby Labonte	TRG Motorsports	Chevrolet	320	70
32	10	9	Kasey Kahne	Richard Petty Motorsports	Ford	310	72^{1}
33	29	29	Kevin Harvick	Richard Childress Racing	Chevrolet	309	64
34	20	82	Scott Speed	Red Bull Racing Team	Toyota	264	61
35	19	98	Paul Menard	Richard Petty Motorsports	Ford	263	58
36	15	16	Greg Biffle	Roush Fenway Racing	Ford	245	55
37	42	7	Kevin Conway	Robby Gordon Motorsports	Toyota	162	52
38	34	87	Joe Nemechek	NEMCO Motorsports	Toyota	161	49
39	23	46	Michael McDowell	Whitney Motorsports	Chevrolet	160	46
40	38	36	J. J. Yeley	Tommy Baldwin Racing	Chevrolet	152	43
41	22	19	Elliott Sadler	Richard Petty Motorsports	Ford	150	40
42	39	55	Mike Bliss	Prism Motorsports	Toyota	145	37
43	1	11	Denny Hamlin	Joe Gibbs Racing	Toyota	143	39^{1}
^{1} Includes five bonus points for leading a lap
^{2} Includes ten bonus points for leading the most laps

== Standings after the race ==
Drivers' Championship standings

	Pos	Driver	Points
	1	Kevin Harvick‡	3,585
	2	Jeff Gordon‡	3,366
	3	Kyle Busch*	3,325
2	4	Tony Stewart*	3,302
1	5	Carl Edwards*	3,288

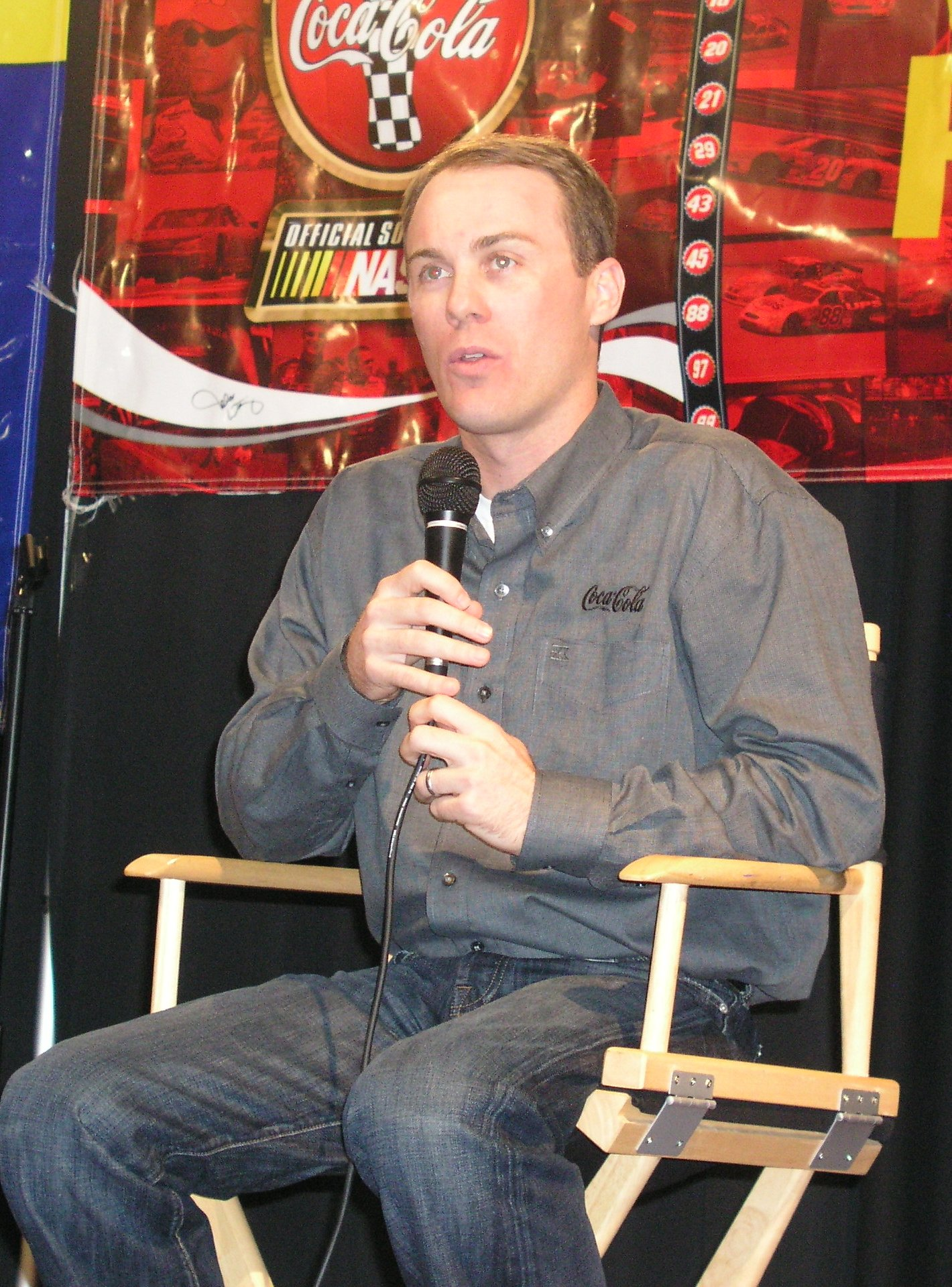
Kevin Harvick remained the Drivers' Championship leader, even after finishing thirty-third in the race.

Manufacturers' Championship standings

Pos	Manufacturer	Points
1	Chevrolet	182
2	Toyota	150
3	Ford	116
4	Dodge	102

- Note: Only the top five positions are included for driver's standings.
- * – This driver clinched a position in the Chase for the Sprint Cup.
- ‡ – This driver is in the Chase for the Sprint Cup.

Previous race: 2010 Irwin Tools Night Race	Sprint Cup Series; 2010 season	Next race: 2010 Air Guard 400
