= Edward Robinson =

Edward or Eddie Robinson may refer to:

== Politicians ==
- Edward Robinson (Maine politician) (1796–1857), U.S. Representative from Maine
- Edward Robinson (Canadian politician) (1829–1888), Ontario lawyer and political figure
- Edward Robinson (Australian politician) (1839–1913), Member of the Western Australian Legislative Council

== Sports ==
=== American football ===
- Edward N. Robinson (1873–1945), American college football coach at University of Nebraska–Lincoln, Brown University, and University of Maine
- Eddie Robinson (American football coach) (1919–2007), American college football coach at Grambling State University
- Eddie Robinson Jr. (born 1970), American football linebacker and coach at Alabama State University
- Ed Robinson (American football) (born 1970), American football linebacker

=== Other sports ===
- Edward Robinson (cricketer) (1862–1942), English amateur first-class cricketer
- Eddie Robinson (soccer) (born 1978), retired American soccer player
- Eddie Robinson (baseball) (1920–2021), American Major League Baseball first baseman, scout, coach and front office executive
- Eddie Robinson (rugby union) (1927–1983), New Zealand rugby union player
- Eddie Robinson (basketball) (born 1976), American professional basketball player
- Edu Robinson (born 2009), British-Spanish racing driver

== Others ==
- Edward Robinson (?–1816), London silversmith of Phipps & Robinson
- Edward Robinson (scholar) (1794–1863), American biblical scholar and archaeologist
- Edward Robinson (curator) (1858–1931), American writer and authority on art
- Edward Robinson (VC) (1838–1896), English recipient of the Victoria Cross
- Edward G. Robinson (1893–1973), Romanian-born American actor
- Edward Ray Robinson (1893–1979), American set decorator
- Edward G. Robinson Jr. (1933–1974), American actor and son of also famous actor Edward G. Robinson (1893–1973)
- Edward Arthur Robinson (born 1933), chemist and professor at the University of Toronto
- Edward Jewitt Robinson, 19th century Protestant missionary to British India

== See also ==
- Ted Robinson (disambiguation)
- Edwin Arlington Robinson (1869–1935), American poet
