= List of Temple Owls in the NFL draft =

This is a list of Temple Owls football players in the NFL draft.

== Key ==
B	Back	K	Kicker	NT	Nose tackle
C	Center	LB	Linebacker	FB	Fullback
DB	Defensive back	P	Punter	HB	Halfback
DE	Defensive end	QB	Quarterback	WR	Wide receiver
DT	Defensive tackle	RB	Running back	G	Guard
E	End	T	Offensive tackle	TE	Tight end

== Selections ==
Year	Round	Pick	Player	Team	Position
1937	9	86	Bill Docherty	Washington Redskins	T
1940	5	37	Ed Kolman	Chicago Bears	T
1940	12	110	Ed McGee	New York Giants	G
1942	16	141	Andy Tomasic	Pittsburgh Steelers	B
1943	22	204	George Sutch	Chicago Cardinals	B
1943	27	253	Al Drulis	Chicago Cardinals	G
1944	19	195	Jimmy Woodside	Pittsburgh Steelers	C
1945	7	62	Mike Jarmoluk	Detroit Lions	T
1946	15	134	Johnny Timko	Chicago Bears	C
1946	19	172	Jack Burns	Boston Yanks	B
1946	19	173	Bill Cloud	Pittsburgh Steelers	T
1948	6	39	Phil Slosburg	Boston Yanks	B
1952	24	281	Joe Tyrrell	Philadelphia Eagles	G
1953	9	101	Pat Sarnese	Pittsburgh Steelers	T
1954	19	227	Bob Edmiston	San Francisco 49ers	T
1955	18	212	Joe Stout	New York Giants	B
1955	29	349	Ted Robinson	Cleveland Browns	B
1958	30	351	Jim Thompson	Philadelphia Eagles	E
1966	20	303	Joe Petro	Cleveland Browns	DB
1967	14	352	Michael Stromberg	New York Jets	LB
1969	8	185	Jim Callahan	Atlanta Falcons	WR
1970	9	223	Chris Fletcher	San Diego Chargers	DB
1973	4	97	Bill Singletary	San Diego Chargers	LB
1973	10	248	Nick Mike-Mayer	Atlanta Falcons	K
1975	6	154	Henry Hynoski	Cleveland Browns	RB
1975	7	160	Steve Joachim	Baltimore Colts	QB
1975	17	429	Garry Webb	Philadelphia Eagles]	DE
1976	3	92	Don Bitterlich	Seattle Seahawks	K
1977	6	144	Joe Klecko	New York Jets	DT
1977	6	164	Jim Cooper	Dallas Cowboys	T
1979	8	218	Robert Brewer	Kansas City Chiefs	G
1979	11	297	Zachary Dixon	Denver Broncos	RB
1980	8	218	Mike Curcio	Philadelphia Eagles	LB
1980	9	227	Mark Bright	Baltimore Colts	RB
1980	12	328	Wiley Pitts	Houston Oilers	WR
1981	12	330	Mark McCants	Atlanta Falcons	DB
1982	10	260	Gerald Lucear	Minnesota Vikings	WR
1983	8	209	Mike McClearn	Cleveland Browns	G
1984	7	173	Kevin Ross	Kansas City Chiefs	DB
1984u	3	65	Tom Kilkenny	Cincinnati Bengals	LB
1984u	3	73	Tim Riordan	St. Louis Cardinals	QB
1985	3	61	Anthony Young	Indianapolis Colts	DB
1986	1	9	John Rienstra	Pittsburgh Steelers	G
1986	6	158	Lloyd Yancey	Dallas Cowboys	G
1987	1	19	Paul Palmer	Kansas City Chiefs	RB
1987	6	145	Willie Marshall	Green Bay Packers	WR
1987	11	303	Larry Brewton	Cleveland Browns	DB
1988	3	78	Ralph Jarvis	Chicago Bears	DE
1988	8	211	Mike Hinnant	Pittsburgh Steelers	TE
1989	8	220	Todd McNair	Kansas City Chiefs	RB
1994	2	31	Tre' Johnson	Washington Redskins	T
1996	2	57	Lance Johnstone	Oakland Raiders	DE
1996	6	187	Jon Clark	Chicago Bears	T
1997	4	128	Alshermond Singleton	Tampa Bay Buccaneers	LB
2001	4	111	Mathias Nkwenti	Pittsburgh Steelers	T
2002	7	238	Raheem Brock	Philadelphia Eagles	DE
2003	4	117	Dan Klecko	New England Patriots	DT
2003	7	237	Dave Yovanovits	New York Jets	T
2005	5	166	Rian Wallace	Pittsburgh Steelers	LB
2009	3	72	Terrance Knighton	Jacksonville Jaguars	DT
2011	1	30	Muhammad Wilkerson	New York Jets	DT
2011	2	54	Jaiquawn Jarrett	Philadelphia Eagles	DB
2012	3	84	Bernard Pierce	Baltimore Ravens	RB
2012	4	111	Evan Rodriguez	Chicago Bears	TE
2012	5	138	Tahir Whitehead	Detroit Lions	LB
2016	4	104	Tavon Young	Baltimore Ravens	DB
2016	5	152	Matt Ioannidis	Washington Redskins	DE
2016	7	246	Tyler Matakevich	Pittsburgh Steelers	LB
2017	1	13	Haason Reddick	Arizona Cardinals	LB
2017	2	63	Dion Dawkins	Buffalo Bills	G
2017	5	158	Nate Hairston	Indianapolis Colts	DB
2018	6	186	Jacob Martin	Seattle Seahawks	DE
2018	7	223	Jullian Taylor	San Francisco 49ers	DT
2019	2	34	Rock Ya-Sin	Indianapolis Colts	DB
2019	5	140	Ryquell Armstead	Jacksonville Jaguars	RB
2019	7	249	Michael Dogbe	Arizona Cardinals	DE
2020	3	78	Matt Hennessy	Atlanta Falcons	C
2020	5	169	Harrison Hand	Minnesota Vikings	DB
2020	6	196	Shaun Bradley	Philadelphia Eagles	LB
2020	7	241	Chapelle Russell	Tampa Bay Buccaneers	LB
2024	5	139	Jordan Magee	Washington Commanders	LB

== Notable undrafted players ==
Note: No drafts held before 1920

Year	Player	Position	Debut Team	Notes
1936	David Smukler	FB	Philadelphia Eagles	—
1965	Steve Speers	LB	Los Angeles Rams	—
1968	Wayne Colman	LB	Philadelphia Eagles	—
1974	Randy Grossman	TE	Pittsburgh Steelers	—
1979	Steve Watson	WR	Denver Broncos	—
1986	Todd Bowles	DB	Washington Redskins	—
1987	Steve Domonoski	LB	Seattle Seahawks	—
1987	Lee Saltz	QB	Detroit Lions	—
1987	Terry Wright	DB	Cleveland Browns	—
1988	Andy Garczynski	WR	Pittsburgh Steelers	—
1990	Maurice Johnson	TE	Philadelphia Eagles	—
1992	Leslie Shepherd	WR	Tampa Bay Buccaneers	—
1992	Santo Stephens	LB	Kansas City Chiefs	—
1998	Larry Chester	DT	Indianapolis Colts	—
1999	Stacey Mack	RB	Jacksonville Jaguars	—
2002	Jason McKie	FB	Philadelphia Eagles	—
2005	A. J. Lindsay	DT	Green Bay Packers	—
2006	Antwon Burton	DT	Denver Broncos	—
2009	Adam DiMichele	QB	Philadelphia Eagles	—
2009	Travis Shelton	WR	Denver Broncos	—
2010	Steve Maneri	T	Houston Texans	—
2010	Andre Neblett	DT	Carolina Panthers	—
2010	Brian Sanford	DE	Cleveland Browns	—
2011	Michael Campbell	WR	New York Jets	—
2011	Eli Joseph	DE	Green Bay Packers	—
2011	Elijah Joseph	LB	Green Bay Packers	—
2012	Adrian Robinson	LB	Pittsburgh Steelers	—
2013	Matt Brown	KR	Tampa Bay Buccaneers	—
2013	Brandon McManus	K	Indianapolis Colts	—
2013	Martin Wallace	T	Cleveland Browns	—
2016	Robbie Anderson	WR	New York Jets	—
2017	Praise Martin-Oguike	DE	Miami Dolphins	—
2017	Jahad Thomas	LB	Dallas Cowboys	—
2017	P. J. Walker	QB	Indianapolis Colts	—
2018	Sean Chandler	S	New York Giants	—
2018	Sharif Finch	LB	Tennessee Titans	—
2018	Adonis Jennings	WR	Green Bay Packers	—
2018	Keith Kirkwood	WR	New Orleans Saints	—
2019	Ventell Bryant	WR	Cincinnati Bengals	—
2020	Isaiah Wright	WR	Washington Football Team	—
2023	Jose Barbon	WR	Dallas Cowboys	—
2024	David Martin-Robinson	TE	Tennessee Titans	—
2024	Yvandy Rigby	LB	Baltimore Ravens	—
2025	Diwun Black	OLB	Baltimore Ravens	—
2025	Maddux Trujillo	PK	Indianapolis Colts	—
