= Ted Robinson =

Ted Robinson may refer to:

- Ted Robinson (American football) (1904–?), American college football player and coach
- Ted Robinson (footballer) (1903–1972), English footballer with Southampton, Southport and Wigan Athletic
- Ted Robinson (golf course architect) (1923–2008), American golf course architect
- Ted Robinson (sportscaster) (born 1957), American sportscaster
- Ted Robinson (TV director) (born 1944), Australian television director/producer

== See also ==
- Edward Robinson (disambiguation)
- Theodore Robinson (disambiguation)
