= 2010 Air Guard 400 =

Race details
- Race 26 of 36 in the 2010 NASCAR Sprint Cup Series
- Date: September 11, 2010
- Location: Richmond International Raceway, Richmond, Virginia
- Course: Permanent racing facility
- Course length: 0.75 miles (1.21 km)
- Distance: 400 laps, 300 mi (483 km)
- Weather: Mostly sunny with temperatures up to 82 °F (28 °C); wind out of the NE approaching 5 mph.
- Average speed: 104.096 miles per hour (167.526 km/h)

Pole position
Driver	Carl Edwards	Roush Fenway Racing
- Time: 21.133

Most laps led
Driver	Denny Hamlin	Joe Gibbs Racing
- Laps: 251

Winner
No. 11	Denny Hamlin	Joe Gibbs Racing

Television in the United States
- Network: ABC
- Announcers: Marty Reid, Dale Jarrett and Andy Petree
- Nielsen ratings: 3.1/5 (Final); 2.8/5 (Overnight); (5.288 million)

The 2010 Air Guard 400 was a NASCAR Sprint Cup Series stock car race that was held on September 11, 2010, at Richmond International Raceway in Richmond, Virginia. Contested over 400 laps, it was the twenty-sixth and final race leading into the Chase for the Sprint Cup in the 2010 Sprint Cup Series season. Denny Hamlin won the race for the Joe Gibbs Racing team; his teammate, Kyle Busch, finished second while Jimmie Johnson clinched third.

Carl Edwards won the pole position, holding the lead until lap 51 when Johnson passed him. Hamlin, however, was the dominant driver for most of the race, taking the lead on lap 110 and leading the most laps throughout the race (251). There were three cautions and fourteen lead changes among six different drivers throughout the course of the race.

It was Hamlin's sixth win of the season and the fifteenth of his career. The result of having six wins moved him into first in the Drivers' Championship, ten points ahead of Johnson and thirty ahead of Kevin Harvick to begin the 2010 Chase for the Sprint Cup. Chevrolet maintained its lead in the Manufacturers' Championship, twenty-nine ahead of Toyota and sixty-eight ahead of Ford, with ten races remaining in the season. A total of 95,000 people attended the race, while 5.288 million watched it live on television.

== Report ==
=== Background ===
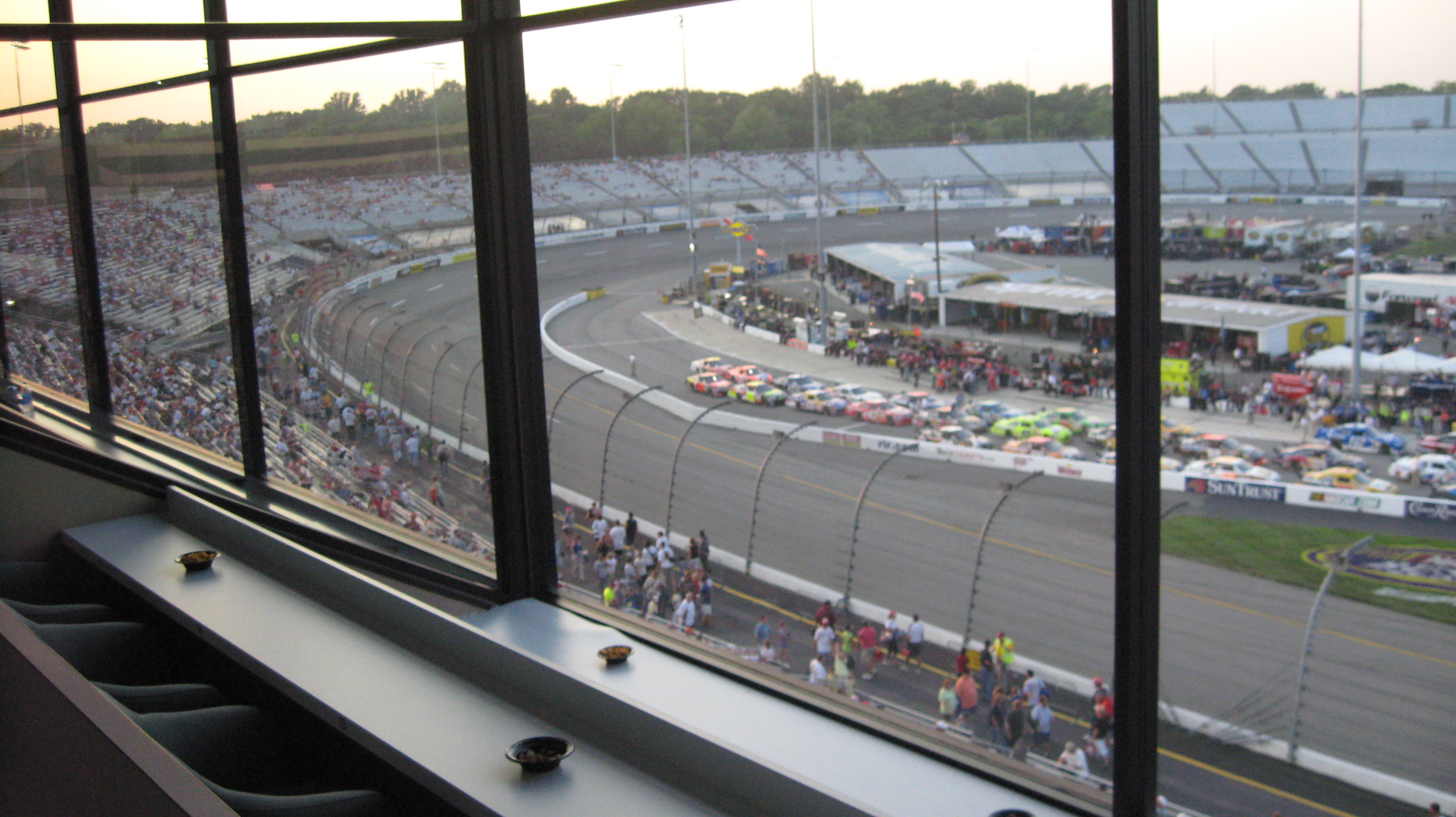
Richmond International Raceway, the race track where the race was held.

Richmond International Raceway is one of five short tracks to hold NASCAR races; the others are Bristol Motor Speedway, Dover International Speedway, Martinsville Speedway, and Phoenix International Raceway. The NASCAR race makes use of the track's standard configuration, a four-turn short track oval that is 0.75 miles (1.21 km) long. The track's turns are banked at fourteen degrees; the front stretch, the location of the finish line, is banked at eight degrees while the back stretch has two degrees of banking.

Before the race, Kevin Harvick led the Drivers' Championship with 3,585 points, and Jeff Gordon followed in second with 3,366 points. Kyle Busch was third in the Drivers' Championship with 3,325 points, Tony Stewart was fourth with 3,302 points, and Carl Edwards was fifth with 3,288 points. Five additional drivers had clinched spots in the Chase—in order of placement, Jeff Burton, Jimmie Johnson, Kurt Busch, Matt Kenseth, and Denny Hamlin. Greg Biffle, who was 11th in the standings with 3,110 points, needed only a finish of 42nd place in the race to secure his spot in the Chase. Clint Bowyer, in the final Chase spot of 12th in the standings with 3,066 points, clinched his spot with a race finish of 28th or better. In the Manufacturers' Championship, Chevrolet was leading with 182 points, thirty-two points ahead of their rival Toyota. Ford, with 116 points, was fourteen points ahead of Dodge in the battle for third. Hamlin was the race's defending champion.

This race was sponsored by the Air National Guard. Going into the race, Col. Mary Salcido, director of recruiting and retention for the Air National Guard, expressed his belief that the sponsorship would allow the organization to achieve its recruitment goals; saying that "with NASCAR having one of the largest fan bases next to the NFL, the marketing and number of people that an event like this reaches are in the millions."

=== Practice and qualifying ===
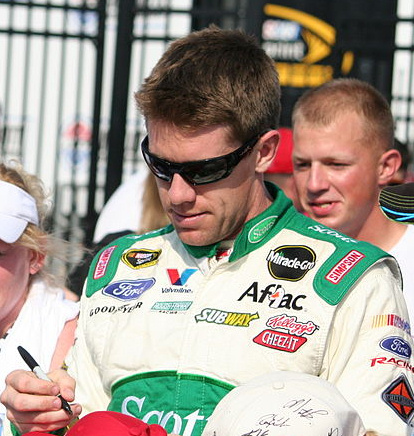
Carl Edwards (pictured in 2011) won pole position with the fastest time, 21.133.

Two practice sessions was held before the Saturday race—both on Friday. The first session lasted 120 minutes, while the second session lasted 45 minutes. During the first practice session, Bowyer was quickest with a time of 22.007 seconds. Ryan Newman placed second, ahead of Juan Pablo Montoya, Edwards, and David Reutimann in the third, fourth and fifth positions respectively. In the second and final practice session, Edwards was quickest ahead of Paul Menard and Montoya in second and third. Biffle was scored fourth ahead of Kasey Kahne in fifth.

During qualifying, forty-eight cars were entered, but only forty-three were able to race because of NASCAR's qualifying procedure. Edwards clinched his sixth career pole position, with a time of 21.133 seconds. He was joined on the front row of the grid by Montoya. A. J. Allmendinger qualified third, Bowyer took fourth, and Reutimann started fifth. The five drivers who failed to qualify for the race were Terry Labonte, Michael McDowell, Todd Bodine, Scott Riggs, and Brian Keselowski. Labonte, however, replaced Mike Bliss during the race.

Following the qualifying session, Edwards stated, "There's really no pressure. It's just go out and have fun, try not to run into Clint Bowyer or any of those guys that have a lot on the line. I think the key for us is to just go out and win a race. While the pressure's off, you can go out and you can take risks and race harder and sometimes you get a chance to perform really well. That's just what we need to start the Chase." After qualifying fourth, Bowyer predicted that teams would utilize several different strategies as the race went on: "Some teams can afford to take gambles — fuel mileage-wise, tire-wise, strategy-wise. That separates the race out. It really shakes things up. At the end of the races you are going to see guys keeping track position and doing whatever it takes to be up front to have that opportunity to win."

=== Race ===
The race, the twenty-sixth out of a total of thirty-six in the season, began at 7:30 pm EDT and was televised live in the United States on ABC. Before the race, conditions were sunny with a temperature of 82 °F (28 °C). Chaplain Rick Jenkins began pre-race ceremonies by giving the invocation. Next, Synthia Seymour performed the national anthem, and Lieutenant General Harry Wyatt III gave the command for drivers to start their engines. On the pace laps, Mattias Ekström moved to the rear on the grid, after changing his engine. As part of the procedure for replacing Bliss for the race, Labonte also had to concede his original starting position to the rear.

Edwards retained his pole position lead into the first corner, followed by Montoya in the second position. After two laps of racing, Brad Keselowski had moved up two positions into sixth on the grid. Two laps later, Allmendinger passed Montoya to claim the second position, but on lap seven, Montoya regained the position. Johnson, after nine laps, had moved from his starting position of eleventh to seventh. By lap 12, Edwards had a 1.31 second lead over Montoya. Two laps later, Johnson moved into the fifth position, as he passed Reutimann. After starting twelfth, Kenseth had moved into the tenth position by lap 21.

Four laps later, Kyle Busch, who started thirtieth, had moved up to twenty-fifth. On lap 27, Jamie McMurray moved into nineteenth, passing Mark Martin, as Montoya was catching Edwards. Stewart moved into the ninth position, after passing Menard. After starting twenty-first, Kurt Busch had moved to eleventh by lap 35. Nine laps later, Bowyer passed Allmendinger, as Johnson passed moved into the third position. On lap 50, Johnson passed Montoya for second. Then, one lap later, he claimed the first position after passing Edwards. On lap 55, Reutimann had a flat tire, which prompted the first caution to be given. All the drivers on the lead lap made their pit stops, as Edwards reclaimed the lead on pit road.

On the lap 62 restart, Edwards and Johnson were first and second respectively. Two laps later, Bowyer claimed second away from Johnson, as Stewart moved into the fourth position. Stewart then moved into the third position, as Johnson fell to fourth. Kurt Busch had moved into the seventh position by lap 76. Fifteen laps after the restart, Edwards had a 1.11 second lead over Bowyer. On lap 80, Johnson reclaimed third, from Stewart, as McMurray moved into thirteenth, after passing Menard. Ten laps later, Hamlin moved into the fifth position. After starting twenty-fifth, Burton had moved to twelfth by lap 95. On lap 100, Bowyer passed Edwards to become the new leader.

Hamlin, then moved into the second position, after passing Johnson and Edwards, by lap 107. Three laps later, Hamlin passed Bowyer to become the new leader. On lap 119, Kurt Busch moved into the ninth position. Eleven laps after Hamlin claimed the lead, he had a lead of 2.1 seconds over Bowyer. On lap 125, Johnson reclaimed the third position. Two laps later, Burton moved into eleventh. On lap 135, Hamlin managed a lead of 3.3 seconds. After starting thirty-third, Kyle Busch had moved into the tenth position by lap 137. Eight laps later, the second caution was given because of the debris from Terry Labonte's collision with the wall. Hamlin remained the leader during pit stops.

Hamlin led going in the first corner on the restart, but Johnson, who restarted third, emerged in the first position two laps later. Hamlin, then reclaimed the lead a lap later. On lap 158, Allmendinger fell to fourth, as Bowyer passed him. Five laps later, Bowyer claimed second away from Johnson. On lap 172, Kyle Busch moved into the seventh position, as Bowyer passed Hamlin for the lead. Six laps later, Kyle Busch passed Montoya to move to the sixth position. Afterwards, Hamlin reclaimed the lead from Bowyer. On lap 180, Kyle Busch moved into the fifth position. Hamlin, on lap 181, fell to second, as Bowyer and him battle for the lead. Nineteen laps later, Hamlin battled Bowyer to become the leader. On lap 203, Johnson moved into the second position, after passing Bowyer.

Ten laps later, Hamlin had a lead of 1.2 seconds over Johnson. On lap 216, Harvick moved to the eighth position, as Newman moved into ninth. On lap 226, light rain showers arrived, prompting NASCAR officials to give the third caution. All the leaders, except Jeff Burton made pit stops on lap 228. Ten laps later, he gave up the lead to Hamlin because of him making a pit stop. Hamlin led during the restart, as Bowyer moved into second. On lap 249, Newman passed Stewart for the eighth position. Nine laps later, Kyle Busch moved into the fourth position. On lap 270, Allmendinger fell to the sixth position, as Joey Logano passed Marcos Ambrose for twelfth.

On lap 273, Kenseth reported to his crew that he was having car handling problems. Eight laps later, Logano moved into ninth, after passing Stewart. By lap 285, Newman had caught Allmendinger for sixth. Fifteen laps later, Logano moved into the seventh position. On lap 306, Dale Earnhardt Jr., who was four laps behind the leader, came to pit road. By lap 309, Hamlin had a 1.3 second lead over Bowyer. Hamlin had increased his lead from 1.3 seconds to 2.21 in only eight laps. On lap 320, Montoya came to pit road, as green flag pit stops began. On lap 328, Montoya passed Hamlin for the first position after the latter came to pit road. Four laps later, Hamlin reclaimed the lead, ahead of Montoya, Bowyer, Johnson and Kyle Busch in the top five positions.

On lap 336, Kyle Busch overtook Montoya for second. On lap 345, Logano moved into the sixth position. On lap 350, Bowyer overtook Montoya for third. After 359 laps, there were only eighteen cars on the same lap as the leader. On lap 366, Logano had caught Montoya (who had since fallen to fifth), but he would not pass him until four laps later. On lap 380, Johnson was in third, 2.5 seconds behind Hamlin. With twenty laps remaining, Hamlin had a lead of 1.2 seconds over Kyle Busch. Hamlin maintained this lead, crossing the line to win the race ahead of Busch, who followed in second. Johnson maintained third while Logano and Ambrose finished fourth and fifth.

=== Post-race ===
"At this point, I think we can win at all of 'em."

— Hamlin speaking after the race.

Hamlin appeared in victory lane to celebrate his sixth win of the season in front of 95,000 people who attended the race. Hamlin also earned $219,975 in race winnings, and he later expressed his confidence heading into the Chase: "It's been an up-and-down year, but there's been a lot of ups, and obviously we're going to enter this Chase No. 1. It means a lot to this whole race team. A lot of people bashed this race team about 'can't finish this, and can't finish that.' But we've got the most wins, and hopefully that's going to carry us for the 10 weeks in the Chase."

After finishing second, Kyle Busch was asked if he thought he had a car capable of contending for wins on a regular basis. He replied, "Not right now. Every single week, we're always a tenth-and-a-half (of a second), two-tenths off." Bowyer, who finished sixth, clinched the final Chase spot and explained, "I was trying to make a statement -- I wanted to win. And I thought we had a shot at winning, but we just got behind and never could get it back, and that's when you need to start thinking, 'I need to take care of business -- I don't need to go out here and make a mistake and take a shot at getting ourselves knocked out of this deal.' So we did what we had to do." Johnson, meanwhile, was pleased with his third-place finish and was also optimistic about his championship chances: "I know the tracks on the schedule, and we all know how good they are for me, and they all give me a lot of hope and excitement moving forward. I don't think that I'm any different this year than last year. Stats may show that maybe this year I'm in better shape than I was last year. ... Either way, I know we've got great tracks coming up, I know we respond well to pressure, and I'm excited for it. I feel good about things."

The race result left Hamlin leading the Drivers' Championship with 5,060 points after the standings were reset for the Chase. Johnson was second on 5,050, twenty points ahead of Harvick, Kyle Busch, and Kurt Busch. Stewart and Biffle followed in a tie for sixth, ten points ahead of Jeff Gordon, Edwards, and Burton. Kenseth and Bowyer rounded out the top twelve in points. In the Manufacturers' Championship, Chevrolet maintained their lead with 188 points. Toyota remained second with 159 points, having gained three points on their rival. Ford followed with 120 points, fifteen points ahead of Dodge in fourth. 5.288 million people watched the race live on television.

== Results ==
=== Qualifying ===
Grid	No.	Driver	Team	Manufacturer	Time	Speed
1	99	Carl Edwards	Roush Fenway Racing	Ford	21.133	127.762
2	42	Juan Pablo Montoya	Earnhardt Ganassi Racing	Chevrolet	21.184	127.455
3	43	A. J. Allmendinger	Richard Petty Motorsports	Ford	21.243	127.101
4	33	Clint Bowyer	Richard Childress Racing	Chevrolet	21.247	127.077
5	00	David Reutimann	Michael Waltrip Racing	Toyota	21.257	127.017
6	20	Joey Logano	Joe Gibbs Racing	Toyota	21.264	126.975
7	98	Paul Menard	Richard Petty Motorsports	Ford	21.268	126.951
8	12	Brad Keselowski	Penske Racing	Dodge	21.270	126.939
9	88	Dale Earnhardt Jr.	Hendrick Motorsports	Chevrolet	21.296	126.784
10	9	Kasey Kahne	Richard Petty Motorsports	Ford	21.299	126.767
11	48	Jimmie Johnson	Hendrick Motorsports	Chevrolet	21.318	126.654
12	17	Matt Kenseth	Roush Fenway Racing	Ford	21.343	126.505
13	47	Marcos Ambrose	JTG Daugherty Racing	Toyota	21.343	126.505
14	11	Denny Hamlin	Joe Gibbs Racing	Toyota	21.349	126.470
15	14	Tony Stewart	Stewart–Haas Racing	Chevrolet	21.354	126.440
16	26	Jeff Green	Latitude 43 Motorsports	Ford	21.357	126.422
17	78	Regan Smith	Furniture Row Racing	Chevrolet	21.359	126.410
18	13	Casey Mears	Germain Racing	Toyota	21.366	126.369
19	5	Mark Martin	Hendrick Motorsports	Chevrolet	21.370	126.345
20	29	Kevin Harvick	Richard Childress Racing	Chevrolet	21.393	126.210
21	2	Kurt Busch	Penske Racing	Dodge	21.406	126.133
22	24	Jeff Gordon	Hendrick Motorsports	Chevrolet	21.422	126.039
23	39	Ryan Newman	Stewart–Haas Racing	Chevrolet	21.422	126.039
24	16	Greg Biffle	Roush Fenway Racing	Ford	21.424	126.027
25	31	Jeff Burton	Richard Childress Racing	Chevrolet	21.440	125.933
26	6	David Ragan	Roush Fenway Racing	Ford	21.455	125.845
27	36	Dave Blaney	Tommy Baldwin Racing	Chevrolet	21.458	125.827
28	71	Landon Cassill	TRG Motorsports	Chevrolet	21.461	125.810
29	56	Martin Truex Jr.	Michael Waltrip Racing	Toyota	21.472	125.745
30	87	Joe Nemechek	NEMCO Motorsports	Toyota	21.477	125.716
31	82	Scott Speed	Red Bull Racing Team	Toyota	21.482	125.687
32	18	Kyle Busch	Joe Gibbs Racing	Toyota	21.503	125.564
33	77	Sam Hornish Jr.	Penske Racing	Dodge	21.510	125.523
34	1	Jamie McMurray	Earnhardt Ganassi Racing	Chevrolet	21.520	125.465
35	32	Jason Leffler	Braun Racing	Toyota	21.543	125.331
36	19	Elliott Sadler	Richard Petty Motorsports	Ford	21.551	125.284
37	55	Mike Bliss	Prism Motorsports	Toyota	21.560	125.232
38	38	Travis Kvapil	Front Row Motorsports	Ford	21.578	125.127
39	37	David Gilliland	Front Row Motorsports	Ford	21.598	125.012
40	34	Tony Raines	Front Row Motorsports	Ford	21.636	124.792
41	7	Kevin Conway	Robby Gordon Motorsports	Toyota	21.792	123.899
42	83	Mattias Ekström	Red Bull Racing Team	Toyota	21.824	123.717
43	09	Bobby Labonte	Phoenix Racing	Chevrolet	Champion's Provisional	
Failed to qualify
44	10	Terry Labonte	Stavola Labonte Racing	Chevrolet	21.605	124.971
45	46	Michael McDowell	Whitney Motorsports	Dodge	21.712	124.355
46	64	Todd Bodine	Gunselman Motorsports	Toyota	21.723	124.292
47	66	Scott Riggs	Prism Motorsports	Toyota	21.767	124.041
48	92	Brian Keselowski	K-Automotive Motorsports	Dodge	21.967	122.912

=== Race results ===
Pos	Grid	No.	Driver	Team	Manufacturer	Laps	Points
1	14	11	Denny Hamlin	Joe Gibbs Racing	Toyota	400	195^{2}
2	32	18	Kyle Busch	Joe Gibbs Racing	Toyota	400	170
3	11	48	Jimmie Johnson	Hendrick Motorsports	Chevrolet	400	170^{1}
4	6	20	Joey Logano	Joe Gibbs Racing	Toyota	400	160
5	13	47	Marcos Ambrose	JTG Daugherty Racing	Toyota	400	155
6	4	33	Clint Bowyer	Richard Childress Racing	Chevrolet	400	155^{1}
7	2	42	Juan Pablo Montoya	Earnhardt Ganassi Racing	Chevrolet	400	151^{1}
8	3	43	A. J. Allmendinger	Richard Petty Motorsports	Ford	400	142
9	20	29	Kevin Harvick	Richard Childress Racing	Chevrolet	400	138
10	1	99	Carl Edwards	Roush Fenway Racing	Ford	400	139^{1}
11	23	39	Ryan Newman	Stewart–Haas Racing	Chevrolet	400	130
12	22	24	Jeff Gordon	Hendrick Motorsports	Chevrolet	400	127
13	25	31	Jeff Burton	Richard Childress Racing	Chevrolet	400	129^{1}
14	12	17	Matt Kenseth	Roush Fenway Racing	Ford	400	121
15	8	12	Brad Keselowski	Penske Racing	Dodge	399	118
16	15	14	Tony Stewart	Stewart–Haas Racing	Chevrolet	399	115
17	34	1	Jamie McMurray	Earnhardt Ganassi Racing	Chevrolet	399	112
18	21	2	Kurt Busch	Penske Racing	Dodge	399	109
19	5	00	David Reutimann	Michael Waltrip Racing	Toyota	398	106
20	19	5	Mark Martin	Hendrick Motorsports	Chevrolet	398	103
21	18	13	Casey Mears	Germain Racing	Toyota	398	100
22	29	56	Martin Truex Jr.	Michael Waltrip Racing	Toyota	398	97
23	26	6	David Ragan	Roush Fenway Racing	Ford	398	94
24	31	82	Scott Speed	Red Bull Racing Team	Toyota	398	91
25	17	78	Regan Smith	Furniture Row Racing	Chevrolet	398	88
26	7	98	Paul Menard	Richard Petty Motorsports	Ford	397	85
27	36	19	Elliott Sadler	Richard Petty Motorsports	Ford	397	82
28	33	77	Sam Hornish Jr.	Penske Racing	Dodge	397	79
29	10	9	Kasey Kahne	Richard Petty Motorsports	Ford	396	76
30	27	36	Dave Blaney	Tommy Baldwin Racing	Chevrolet	396	73
31	42	83	Mattias Ekström	Red Bull Racing Team	Toyota	396	70
32	24	16	Greg Biffle	Roush Fenway Racing	Ford	395	67
33	28	71	Landon Cassill	TRG Motorsports	Chevrolet	395	64
34	9	88	Dale Earnhardt Jr.	Hendrick Motorsports	Chevrolet	394	61
35	38	38	Travis Kvapil	Front Row Motorsports	Ford	393	58
36	16	26	Jeff Green	Latitude 43 Motorsports	Ford	393	55
37	39	37	David Gilliland	Front Row Motorsports	Ford	393	52
38	40	34	Tony Raines	Front Row Motorsports	Ford	392	49
39	43	09	Bobby Labonte	Phoenix Racing	Chevrolet	324	46
40	37	55	Terry Labonte^{3}	Prism Motorsports	Toyota	143	43
41	41	7	Kevin Conway	Robby Gordon Motorsports	Toyota	118	40
42	30	87	Joe Nemechek	NEMCO Motorsports	Toyota	61	37
43	35	32	Jason Leffler	Braun Racing	Toyota	30	34
^{1} Includes five bonus points for leading a lap
^{2} Includes ten bonus points for leading the most laps
^{3} Replaced Bliss for the race

== Standings after the race ==
Drivers' Championship standings
Pos	Driver	Points before reset	Points after reset
1	Denny Hamlin	3,342	5,060
2	Jimmie Johnson	3,417	5,050
3	Kevin Harvick	3,723	5,030
4	Kyle Busch	3,495	5,030
5	Kurt Busch	3,337	5,030
6	Tony Stewart	3,417	5,010
7	Greg Biffle	3,177	5,010
8	Jeff Gordon	3,493	5,000
9	Carl Edwards	3,427	5,000
10	Jeff Burton	3,390	5,000
11	Matt Kenseth	3,346	5,000
12	Clint Bowyer	3,221	5,000

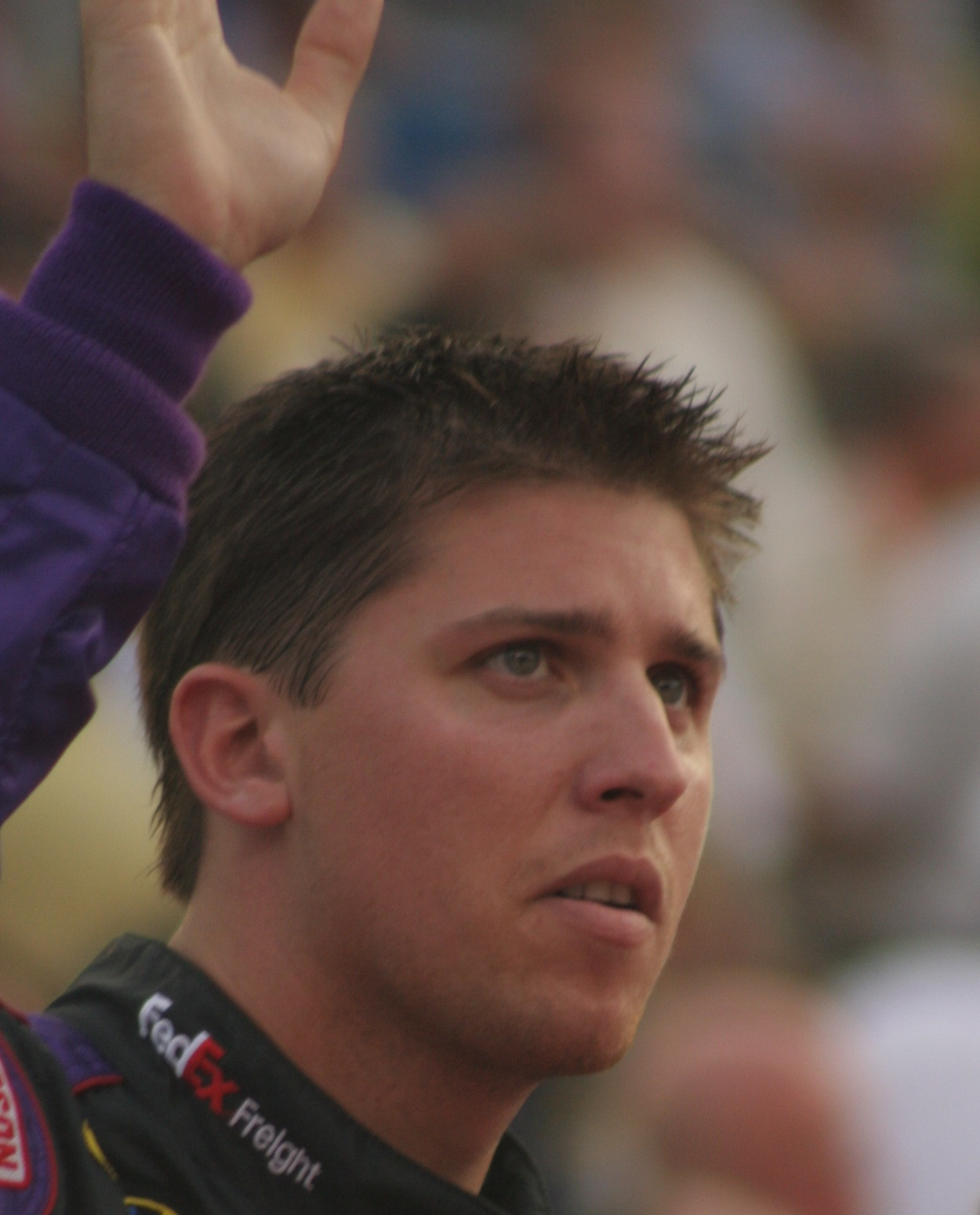
Despite being 9th before the reset, Denny Hamlin (pictured in 2007) assumed the points lead by virtue of earning the most wins throughout the regular season.

Manufacturers' Championship standings
Pos	Manufacturer	Points
1	Chevrolet	188
2	Toyota	159
3	Ford	120
4	Dodge	105

- Note: Only the top twelve positions are included for the driver standings. These drivers qualified for the Chase for the Sprint Cup.
- Note: Drivers are arranged in order of points after the Chase reset, although their point totals before the Chase are also included. All drivers qualifying for the Chase have their point totals reset to 5,000, with a 10-point bonus for each race won during the season before the Chase. Ties are broken on a countback system, with the first tiebreaker being top-5 finishes, followed by top-10s, races finished, and pole positions.

Previous race: 2010 Emory Healthcare 500	Sprint Cup Series; 2010 season	Next race: 2010 Sylvania 300
