= Joe Gibbs =

American race team owner and football coach (born 1940)

- Gibbs in 2026

Personal information
- Born: November 25, 1940 (age 85); Mocksville, North Carolina, U.S.

Career information
- High school: Santa Fe (Santa Fe Springs, California)
- College: San Diego State

Career history
- San Diego State (1964–1966) Offensive line coach; Florida State (1967–1968) Offensive line coach; USC (1969–1970) Offensive line coach; Arkansas (1971–1972) Running backs coach; St. Louis Cardinals (1973–1977) Running backs coach; Tampa Bay Buccaneers (1978) Offensive coordinator; San Diego Chargers (1979–1980) Offensive coordinator; Washington Redskins (1981–1992, 2004–2007) Head coach

Awards and highlights
- Football: 3× Super Bowl champion (XVII, XXII, XXVI); 2× NFL Coach of the Year (1982, 1983); NFL 100th Anniversary All-Time Team; Washington Commanders Ring of Fame; Washington Commanders 90 Greatest; Pro Football Hall of Fame (1996); Auto racing: 5× NASCAR Cup Series champion; 4× NASCAR O'Reilly Auto Parts Series champion; 4× Daytona 500 champion (1993, 2016, 2019, 2020); NASCAR Hall of Fame (2020)

Career statistics
- Coaching record: 154–94 (.621)
- Postseason record: 17–7 (.708)
- Career record: 171–101 (.629)
- Stats at Pro Football Reference
- Coaching profile at Pro Football Reference
- Pro Football Hall of Fame

Joe Jackson Gibbs (born November 25, 1940) is an American former football coach who is an auto racing team owner. He served as the head coach of the Washington Redskins of the National Football League (NFL) from 1981 to 1992 and then 2004 to 2007, leading them to nine playoff appearances, four NFC Championship titles, and three Super Bowl wins over 16 seasons.

Gibbs is considered one of the most visionary offensive minds in NFL history due to his creation of multiple concepts, ability to plan and develop an attack according to the personnel of his roster, and address the needs to protect against defensive schemes, while doing so with what was is generally considered to be mostly average talent by NFL standards. Gibbs's success has led the Pro Football Hall of Fame to coin him as "the most gifted technician who could win with anyone, and was therefore perhaps the greatest strategist ever." He was named the NFL Coach of the Year in both 1982 and 1983. Gibbs remains the only head coach to win Super Bowls with three different starting quarterbacks, prompting Steve Sabol of NFL Films to call his first tenure as "the most diverse dynasty in NFL history equaled by no other head coach before or since". In 1992, he and his sons founded Joe Gibbs Racing, the NASCAR team that has since secured five NASCAR Cup Series championships.

Gibbs's championship legacy spans two distinctly different sports: three Super Bowls with three different quarterbacks in the NFL, none of whom are in the Hall of Fame, and five NASCAR championships featuring three different drivers and three different manufacturers. Having led eight top-level championships across American football and auto racing—each achieved with different key contributors, Gibbs is widely regarded as one of the greatest leaders in American professional sports history, regardless of the sport or personnel. The Pro Football Hall of Fame explicitly called Gibbs "the greatest multi-sport winner in American professional sports history", and commentators have described him as "arguably the greatest coach we've ever seen in American sports" due to his unmatched dual-sport championship legacy.

Gibbs was one of ten head coaches named to the NFL 100th Anniversary All-Time Team, and holds the unique distinction of being the only individual inducted into both the Pro Football Hall of Fame and the NASCAR Hall of Fame.

== Early life and college ==
Born in Mocksville, North Carolina, Gibbs is the older of two sons of Jackson Cephus Gibbs (1916–1989) and Winnie Era Blalock (1915–2000). He graduated from Santa Fe High School in 1959, where he played quarterback and was named All-San Gabriel League as a senior. In addition to football, Gibbs also lettered in basketball and baseball there. Gibbs attended Cerritos College before earning a Bachelor of Arts degree in 1964 and a master's degree in 1966 from San Diego State University.

== Coaching career ==
=== Early career ===
Gibbs began his career in 1964 coaching offensive linemen under Don Coryell for the San Diego State Aztecs football team. He served two years each at Florida State, USC, and Arkansas. Gibbs then advanced to the National Football League, hired as the offensive backfield coach for the St. Louis Cardinals (1973–1977) by Coryell, who had been named head coach. After a season as offensive coordinator for the Tampa Bay Buccaneers (1978) under former USC coach John McKay, Gibbs rejoined Coryell with the San Diego Chargers in 1979.

=== Advocating for Black quarterbacks in the NFL ===
While in Tampa, Gibbs developed the reputation as a leading pioneer for championing black quarterbacks in the NFL, which was considered extremely controversial and even potentially divisive at the time. After thoroughly studying Matt Cavanaugh, who led Pitt to a national championship, Guy Benjamin, an All-American from Stanford University, and Doug Williams from Grambling State University, Gibbs rated Williams as the best professional prospect, and informed head coach McKay that Williams would be "hands down and without question" the best quarterback in the 1978 NFL draft. According to Tony Dungy, "People don't realize that Joe Gibbs changed the face of the NFL by having the courage to say, in a Southern town at that time, that Doug Williams is the guy we should take. When Tampa drafted Doug, it shocked the whole country to take this unknown from Grambling over those star players from Pitt and Stanford. But that was Joe Gibbs. He was looking for the best player possible." With the recommendation of Gibbs, Tampa Bay selected Williams, and became the first African-American drafted in the first round to play quarterback.

In his book Rise of the Black QB, author Jason Reid cited an incident in the 1978 Tampa Bay training camp, in which quarterbacks coach Bill Nelsen began berating Williams in what was described as going beyond coaching and becoming a personal attack. Just a position coach at the time, Gibbs, who was at the opposite end of the field, threw his clipboard down, sprinted over to Nelsen and confronted him. "I think Coach Gibbs knew that it wasn't a matter of being coached hard," recalled Williams. "I mean, I played for Eddie Robinson at Grambling, so he knew I could handle that. But he (Gibbs) immediately sensed that something else was going on." Gibbs pointed his finger in Nelsen's face and said, "Don't you ever talk to him like that again! Is that clear?" According to Williams, Nelsen never confronted Williams in that manner again.

"People don't realize that Joe Gibbs changed the face of the NFL by having the courage to say, in a Southern town at that time, that Doug Williams is the guy we should take. When Tampa drafted Doug, it shocked the whole country to take this unknown from Grambling over those star players from Pitt and Stanford. But that was Joe Gibbs. He was looking for the best player possible."

— Tony Dungy

Gibbs dealt with a quarterback controversy throughout the 1987 season involving Williams and Jay Schroeder. Gibbs ultimately tabbed Williams to lead the team throughout the playoffs, which culminated in a Super Bowl victory. The speculation continued going into the 1988 season, when the Washington Post reported that Gibbs bluntly told Schroeder that Williams was his starter. While Schroeder was a Pro Bowl player two years earlier and the younger of the two, Gibbs sided with Williams, believing that Schroeder lacked the proper attitude to play. “I think Jay, right now, wants to be somewhere else and shouldn’t be playing quarterback for this team with his frame of mind,” Gibbs said. Gibbs also indicated at the time that if Schroeder was still a member of the team when the season began and Williams were to get injured, Schroeder would not be considered as a replacement under any circumstances.

=== The Architect of Air Coryell ===
As offensive coordinator of the San Diego Chargers, Gibbs served under head coach Don Coryell and worked with the team's "Air Coryell" offense. During his two seasons in the position, quarterback Dan Fouts and the Chargers set several franchise and NFL offensive records, and the team ranked among the league leaders in passing offense.

=== Washington Redskins (1981–1992) ===
After firing then-head coach Jack Pardee, Redskins owner Jack Kent Cooke was on the lookout for candidates. When general manager Bobby Beathard pointed out the 40-year-old San Diego assistant coach. Cooke, who famously quipped to Beathard, "Who the hell is Joe Gibbs?" was well-respected as an owner for having a keen eye for spotting leadership and an ability to teach (he also hired Jerry West and Sparky Anderson to their first managerial/executive jobs). Cooke flew Gibbs to New York City for an interview, and identified Gibbs's unshakable confidence, composure, and ability to articulate sophisticated concepts in a clear manner that was direct and coherent. Cooke was so impressed and convinced within 30 minutes of what was supposed to be a three-to-four hour process that he offered Gibbs their head coaching position immediately.

Gibbs's first season with the Redskins started inauspiciously when the team lost their first five games. Cooke famously expressed confidence in Gibbs, declaring that the team would finish 8–8. The losses and Cooke's confidence served as a catalyst, and the newly motivated team improved and reached an even 8–8 record in 1981.

Gibbs's second season with the Redskins, which was shortened by a players strike, saw them finish with an 8–1 regular-season record and defeat the Miami Dolphins 27–17 in Super Bowl XVII. In 1983, Gibbs's success continued with a 14–2 regular-season record and a win against the Los Angeles Rams 51–7 at home, in the divisional round of the playoffs. The Redskins once again won an NFC Championship, defeating the San Francisco 49ers 24–21 on a last-second field goal, advancing to Super Bowl XVIII. The Redskins were installed as a 2-point favorite by Nevada books going into the game, but were soundly defeated by the Los Angeles Raiders 38–9.

The 1984 Redskins won the NFC East with an 11–5 record and hosted a home playoff game against the Chicago Bears but lost 23–19.

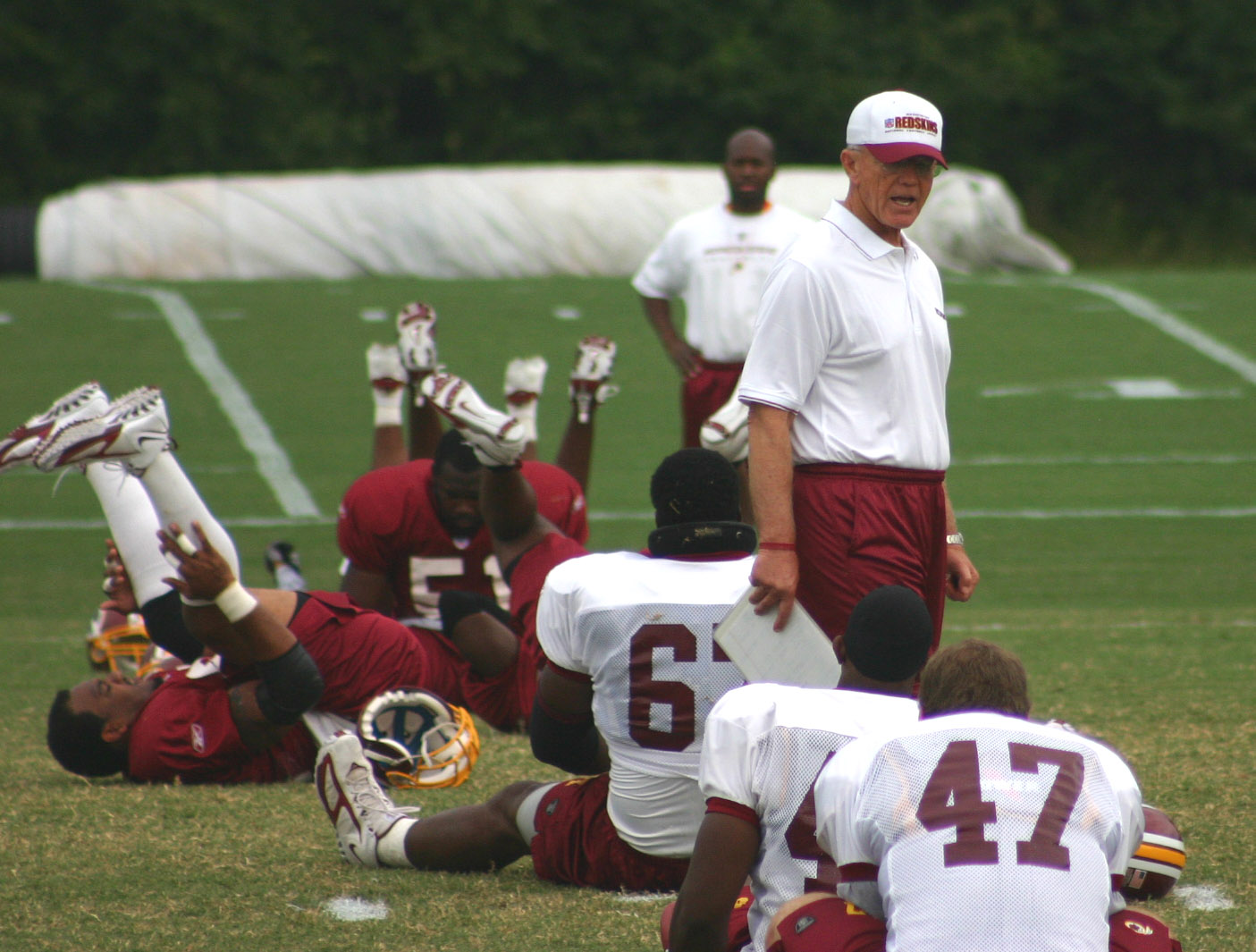
Gibbs during Redskins training camp, 2005

Gibbs coached the 1985 Redskins to a 10–6 regular-season record and barely missed the playoffs. During the season Joe Theismann broke his leg during a Monday Night Football game against the New York Giants, but the Redskins still won the game with Jay Schroeder at quarterback.

In 1986, Gibbs coached the team to a 12–4 regular-season record and defeated the Los Angeles Rams 19–7 in the wild card playoffs, then upset the defending champion Chicago Bears 27–13 in the divisional round, on the road, to get back to the NFC Championship game against the New York Giants. The Giants would win 17–0. It was to be Gibbs's only NFC championship game loss.

The 1987 Redskins made the playoffs and again defeated the Chicago Bears 21–17 on the road in the divisional round, then beat the Minnesota Vikings 17–10 at home in the NFC Championship Game, then at Super Bowl XXII, they rode the arm of quarterback Doug Williams to blow out the Denver Broncos 42–10.

Four years later, the Redskins won their first 11 games before finishing the season 14–2, and cruised through the playoffs with home victories over the Atlanta Falcons (24–7) and Detroit Lions (41–10). In Super Bowl XXVI, the Redskins were up 24–0 on the Buffalo Bills just 16 seconds into the third quarter, and 37–10 with over 11 minutes to go when Gibbs pulled most of his starters. The Bills would score two cosmetic touchdowns for a final score of 37–24. The victory gave Gibbs and the team their third Super Bowl title.

Gibbs returned for the 1992 regular season to defend the Redskins' Super Bowl crown from the previous year. The Redskins finished with a lesser record at 9–7 and third place in the NFC East. They needed a bit of help to make the playoffs and they got it after a loss by the Green Bay Packers got them in as the last Wild Card entry. In the wild-card round, the Redskins defeated the Minnesota Vikings on the road, by the score of 24–7, however they would fall in the divisional round to the San Francisco 49ers in a road game by the score of 20–13, ending the Redskins' hopes of retaining their Super Bowl crown. Two months after Super Bowl XXVII, Gibbs retired on March 5, 1993, surprising many in the organization and around the league. Center Jeff Bostic called it "probably the biggest shock I've gotten in my life." A notorious workaholic, he had begun to suffer health problems, and he cited a desire to spend more time with his family.

From 1994 to 1997, Gibbs served as a color analyst on NBC Sports' NFL pregame show.

=== The Most Diverse Dynasty in NFL History ===
Gibbs built championship teams with many players that previously had mediocre-to-average careers before being discarded by other NFL teams, and perpetually faced turnover in his roster while maintaining success. Unlike traditional dynasties that win with the same franchise quarterback, Gibbs's Redskins were the ultimate outlier, going 16-5 in the playoffs, winning three Super Bowls in 10 years with eight playoff appearances. The constant changes in personnel, as well as the playing style and racial makeup of quarterbacks, led NFL Films to coin his first tenure as "the most diverse dynasty in NFL history".

In 1996, Gibbs was enshrined in the Pro Football Hall of Fame. He was one of the winningest coaches in the NFL, with a record of 124–60, and a post-season record of 16–5. His combined winning percentage of .683 was third all-time (behind Vince Lombardi and John Madden). During his first 12 seasons, the Redskins won 4 NFC East titles, reached the playoffs eight times, and finished with a losing record only one season (7–9 in 1988). Gibbs is the only NFL coach to win three Super Bowls with three different starting quarterbacks and three different starting running backs.

=== Second stint with Redskins (2004–2007) ===
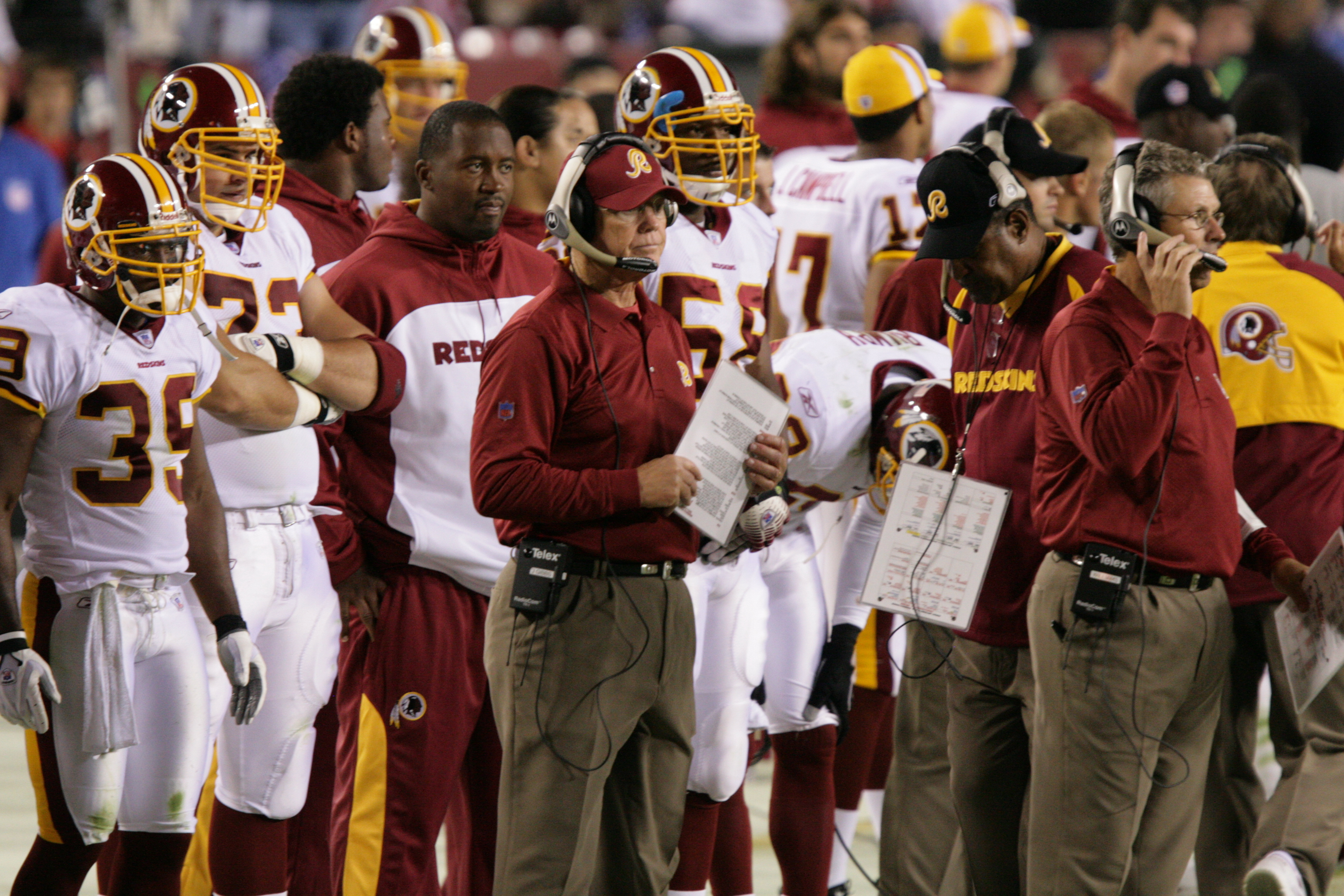
Gibbs as head coach of the Redskins, 2006

Throughout his retirement, many NFL owners approached Gibbs hoping to lure him out of retirement, but to no avail. Some owners even offered to move his entire NASCAR racing team to their team's city if he came back. The only team he seriously considered coming back for was the Carolina Panthers when they first joined the NFL as an expansion in 1995. However, he did not believe he would be able to manage his time between his race team and coaching. In 1999, he was part of a group that was trying to buy the Redskins but ultimately failed. In 2002, Gibbs and a small group of investors bought five percent of the Atlanta Falcons from owner Arthur Blank for $27 million. It wasn't until late 2003 when Gibbs took a serious interest in returning to football. Blank and his general manager, Rich McKay moved quickly to interview him for the Falcons' vacant head coaching position due to the firing of Dan Reeves.

In January 2004, Gibbs accepted an offer from Redskins owner Daniel Snyder to return as the team's head coach. At his press conference, Gibbs stated that even though he enjoyed NASCAR, he had also missed coaching in the NFL. Gibbs left his racing team in the hands of his eldest son, J. D., while his other son, Coy, joined him as an assistant with the Redskins. Many coaches from his previous tenure with the team returned with Gibbs as well, including offensive line coach/assistant head coach Joe Bugel, offensive coordinator Don Breaux, quarterbacks coach Jack Burns, and tight ends coach Rennie Simmons. Gibbs also hired former Buffalo Bills head coach Gregg Williams to join the team to run the defense and hired one of his former running backs, Earnest Byner, to serve as running backs coach.

In 2004, Gibbs had what was, up to that point, the worst season of his career with a 6–10 finish. However, the team did finish the season on a high note with a 21–18 victory over playoff-bound Minnesota. The defense also finished the season ranked third in yards allowed. Hoping to improve on the previous season's dismal passing attack, Gibbs added former Jacksonville Jaguars offensive coordinator Bill Musgrave as his quarterbacks coach. Having coached new Redskins quarterback Mark Brunell when they both were in Jacksonville, they easily formed a rapport. Musgrave's input allowed the Redskins to add a few new wrinkles to their playbook. For the first time under Gibbs, the Redskins offense used the shotgun formation. In the Wild Card playoff game, Gibbs led his team to a 17–10 victory over the Tampa Bay Buccaneers, to whom the Redskins suffered a 36–35 defeat earlier in the year. In the next round of the playoffs, however, the Redskins could not replicate their early-season victory over the Super Bowl-bound Seattle Seahawks, and lost to the eventual NFC Champion by the score of 20–10.

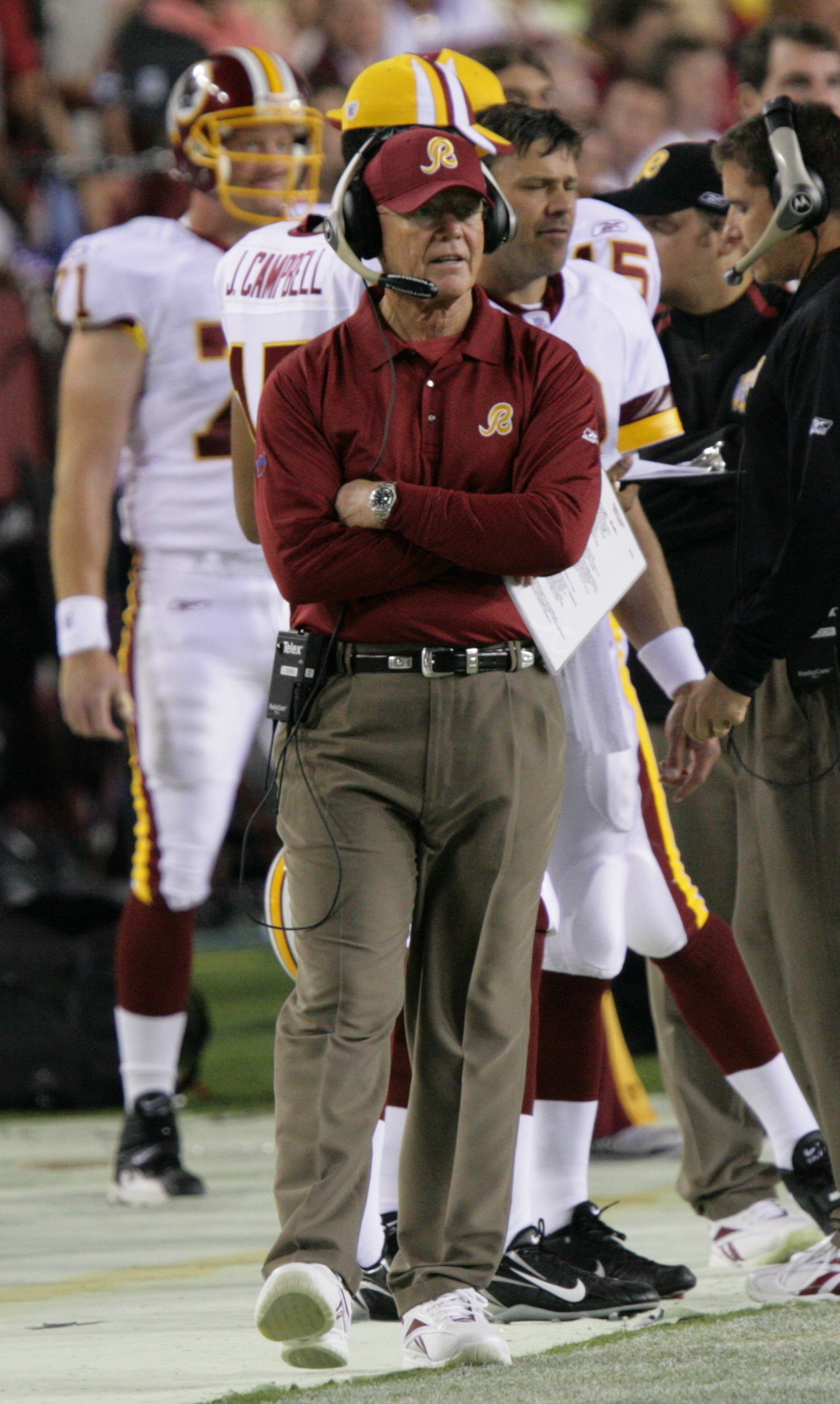
Gibbs in 2006, as head coach of the Redskins

During the 2006 offseason, Gibbs hired Kansas City Chiefs' offensive coordinator Al Saunders to be associate head coach. Saunders came from a similar background as Gibbs, as both learned under Don Coryell. He took over for Gibbs as the team's primary play-caller upon joining the Redskins. This allowed Gibbs to focus more on his role as head coach and CEO and devote more time to personnel matters, defense, and special teams. Gibbs also added former Buffalo Bills defensive coordinator Jerry Gray to his staff as secondary/cornerbacks coach.

The Redskins finished 5–11 in 2006, the team's worst regular-season record under him. The following season the team suffered a tragedy when free safety Sean Taylor was shot in his home during a home robbery in November 2007 and died in the hospital a day later. However, the Redskins still qualified for the playoffs following the completion of a 9–7 regular season before being defeated by the NFC West division champions Seattle Seahawks in the first round. Gibbs retired as head coach and president in January 2008, citing family obligations. During Gibbs's four-year return to the Redskins, the team qualified for the playoffs twice, once more than it qualified for the playoffs during his 11-year absence. He was succeeded as head coach by Jim Zorn.

=== Style of play ===
Although Gibbs helped craft a passing-oriented attack during his time in San Diego, his Redskins teams incorporated a smash-mouth, rushing-oriented attack oriented around such plays as the iconic counter trey. By building a strong offensive line (known as "The Hogs") Gibbs was able to control the line of scrimmage, allowing workhorse running backs John Riggins, George Rogers, and Earnest Byner to power the ground game. Gibbs added a deep passing attack which complemented the ground game, using agile receivers such as Art Monk, Gary Clark, and Ricky Sanders. Gibbs's offense was aided by aggressive defensive units under the direction of defensive coordinator Richie Petitbon.

Gibbs's system was robust enough to be successful without a Hall-of-Fame-caliber quarterback at the helm. The Redskins' Super Bowl victories were won featuring Joe Theismann, Doug Williams, and Mark Rypien. Gibbs is credited with inventing the H-back set, typically by use of a smaller tight end in the backfield. Gibbs was also credited for creating the Trips formation: stacking three wide receivers to one side. He is one of few coaches that used the H-back position prominently in his offense. Gibbs's offenses were known for their extensive number of formations, as well as shifts and motions.

Gibbs remains the only coach to reach the playoffs with six different quarterbacks, win playoff games with five different quarterbacks, and win Super Bowls with three different quarterbacks. As none of his quarterbacks have been enshrined in the Hall of Fame, Gibbs and Bill Belichick are the only head coaches on the NFL 100th Anniversary All-Time Team who never coached a Hall of Fame quarterback at any point in their respective careers, although Tom Brady (who played for Belichick) is widely assumed to be enshrined upon his eligibility in 2028. This achievement is considered among the most remarkable feats in NFL history, which led Gibbs to be called "the master tactician who was perhaps the best strategist ever," and earned him recognition as perhaps the best overall coach ever. As one assessment noted: "Without a Hall of Fame quarterback to his name at any point in his coaching career, Gibbs was tested more from a coaching standpoint than any coach before or since that is enshrined in Canton."

=== An Offensive Visionary ===
Gibbs revolutionized the NFL with his one-back offense through several key innovations. He replaced the traditional blocking fullback with a third receiver, forcing defenses to remove a defender from the box and creating 18% more space for the running back. Gibbs created the H-Back position, a hybrid tight end and fullback that he structured to be able to move pre-snap, line up anywhere, and serve as both a blocker and receiver. This position was originally designed to help protect against the Giants' dominant linebacker Lawrence Taylor by forcing him to line up wider.

Gibbs's strategic philosophy centered on executing a few plays to perfection rather than having thousands of different plays. He ran the same successful plays repeatedly until defenses couldn't stop them, utilizing a physical, punishing offensive line, heavy motion, and shifting to confuse defenses on pass and run designation while creating matchup problems. His offense combined a balanced attack with zone running (Inside Zone and Outside Zone) alongside gap schemes (Power and Counter) for maximum versatility. The system stretched fields vertically when West Coast short passes dominated the league, offering a more downfield approach.

Gibbs also introduced Counter Trey, a counter play with three pulling linemen that became a staple at every level of football and is now the standard NFL counter play based on Gibbs's version. In 1983, the Redskins set a then-NFL record for points with this offense. Today, one-back sets, H-backs, motion, and Counter Trey are league-wide standards used by every team. Gibbs won three Super Bowls with three different quarterbacks using this system, demonstrating its quarterback-friendly design and proving that the offense could succeed regardless of personnel. The New York Times credited Gibbs as the creator and architect of the formation and extoled his development of one of the most innovative offensive schemes in football history.

== Joe Gibbs Racing (1992–present) ==
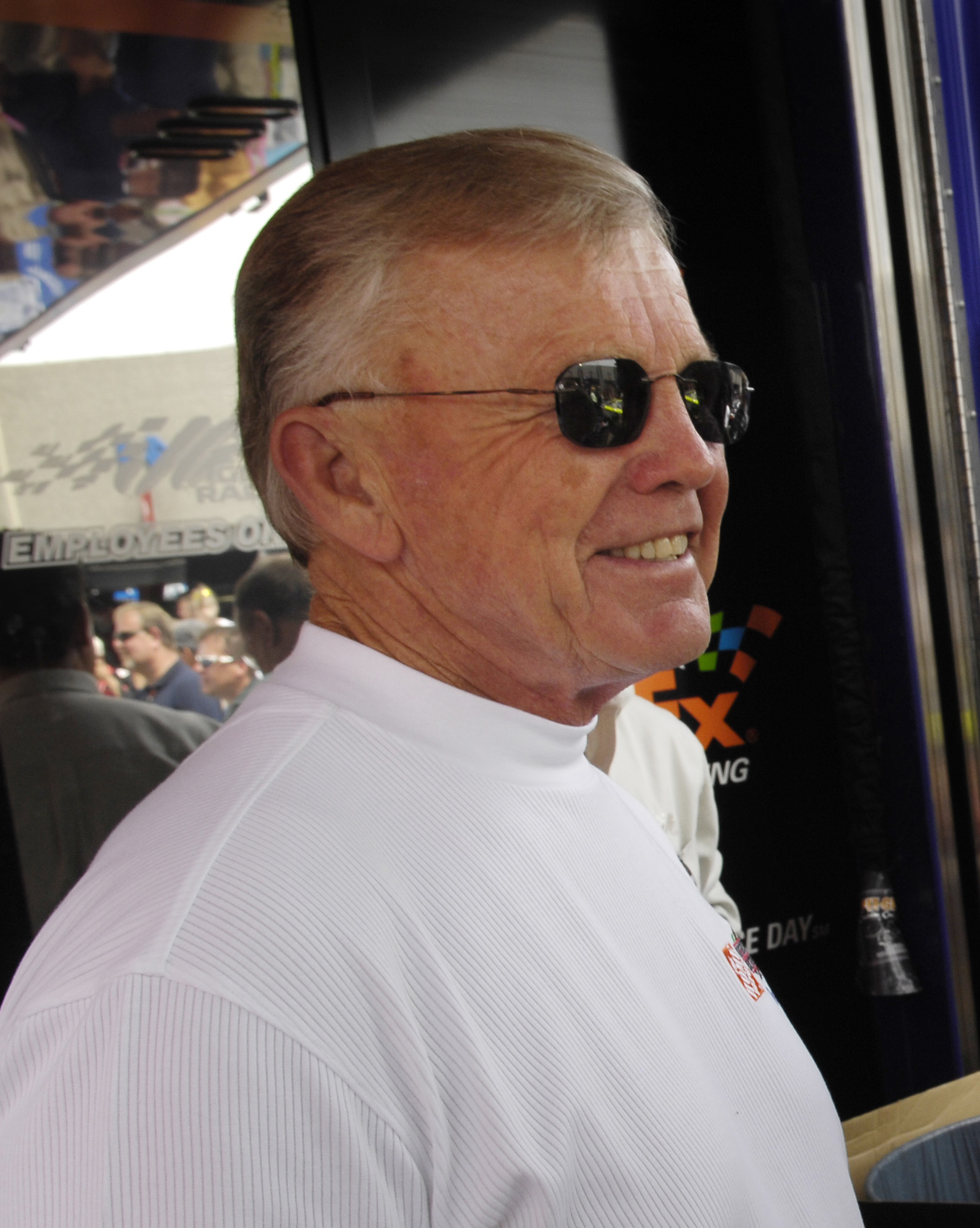
Gibbs during a racing event

Gibbs created his NASCAR team, Joe Gibbs Racing in 1992, a year before he first retired from the NFL. The first driver for his team was Dale Jarrett (1992–1994), with the sponsor Interstate Batteries, and the number 18. His son, J. D. Gibbs, was the president of Joe Gibbs Racing and oversaw daily operations of each of the teams since his father's return to the NFL. J. D. Gibbs died on January 11, 2019. Driver Denny Hamlin won the Daytona 500 on February 17 and dedicated the win to J. D. in his post-race celebration.

The team currently fields four full-time entries in the NASCAR Cup Series and three full-time entries in the NASCAR O'Reilly Auto Parts Series.

=== NASCAR ===
==== Cup Series teams ====
- No. 11 Denny Hamlin
- No. 19 Chase Briscoe
- No. 20 Christopher Bell
- No. 54 Ty Gibbs

==== NOAPS Series teams ====
- No. 18 William Sawalich
- No. 19 Gio Ruggiero, Brent Crews, Chase Briscoe, and Christopher Bell
- No. 20 Brandon Jones
- No. 54 Taylor Gray

==== NASCAR championships ====
- 2000 – Bobby Labonte, No. 18 Interstate Batteries Pontiac, Winston Cup Series
- 2002 – Tony Stewart, No. 20 Home Depot Pontiac, Winston Cup Series
- 2005 – Tony Stewart, No. 20 Home Depot Chevrolet, Nextel Cup Series
- 2007 – Joey Logano, No. 20 Joe Gibbs Driven Racing Oil Chevrolet, Busch East Series
- 2009 – Kyle Busch, No. 18 Z-Line Toyota, Nationwide Series
- 2015 – Kyle Busch, No. 18 M&M's Toyota, Sprint Cup Series
- 2016 – Daniel Suárez, No. 19 Arris Toyota, Xfinity Series
- 2019 – Kyle Busch, No. 18 M&M's Toyota, Monster Energy Cup Series
- 2021 – Ty Gibbs, No. 18 Monster Energy Toyota, ARCA Menards Series
- 2021 – Sammy Smith, No. 18 Engine Ice Toyota, ARCA Menards Series East
- 2021 – Daniel Hemric, No. 18 Poppy Bank Toyota, Xfinity Series
- 2022 – Sammy Smith, No. 18 TMC Transportation Toyota, ARCA Menards Series East
- 2022 – Ty Gibbs, No. 54 Monster Energy Toyota, Xfinity Series

=== NHRA ===
Beginning in 1995, Gibbs fielded three cars in the NHRA, one, in each of these professional categories:

- the Funny Car, driven by Cruz Pedregon
- the Top Fuel dragster, driven by Cory McClenathan
- the Pro Stock Firebird, driven by Jim Yates

Yates would bring home 2 NHRA Winston Pro Stock Championships in 1996 and 1997. McDonald's was the primary sponsor on all three cars from 1995 to 1997. In 1998 Cruz Pedregon would be sponsored by Interstate Batteries and Jim Yates by SplitFire.

Pedregon won Gibbs's first NHRA National Event as a team owner at the 1995 NHRA Chief Auto Parts Winternationals. He would couple that with a victory at the '95 NHRA U.S. Nationals, third for Pedregon in four years at the U.S. Nationals. Pedregon continued to race for Gibbs until mid-season (Englishtown, New Jersey) in 1999. Ending with a final-round appearance, Pedregon left to race on his own, and was replaced by Tommy Johnson Jr. would win his first Fuel Funny Car win with Gibbs at the '99 NHRA Keystone Nationals and would go to the next two final rounds, scoring another victory in the process. It was announced that after the '99 season, Gibbs team would be reduced to a two-car team, and the Funny Car team was parked from then on.

McClenathan finished second in NHRA Winston Top Fuel points in both 1997 and 1998 with Gibbs. In 1997, McClenathan went on a hot streak, sweeping the famed Western Swing (Denver, Sonoma, Seattle) and a total four wins in a row, 5 in 6 races since Denver, including a final round at the U.S. Nationals in '97. He also took Gibbs's MBNA Top Fuel Dragster to a $200,000 payday, winning the 2000 NHRA Winston No-Bull Showdown, pitting Top Fuel Dragsters against Funny Cars in a 24 car shootout.

Gibbs announced that he would focus solely on his NASCAR teams following the 2000 season, ending the six-year-long relationship with NHRA.

=== Motocross ===
In 2008, Gibbs branched out into motorcycle racing, forming the JGRMX team competing in the AMA motocross and supercross championships. The team is based in Huntersville, North Carolina. The team was managed by Gibbs's son Coy Gibbs until his untimely death in November 2022.

== Game Plan for Life ==
He founded Game Plan for Life in 2009, an evangelical Christian witnessing organization. In 2017, the organization funded the establishment of a Southeastern Baptist Theological Seminary campus in the Nash Correctional Institution prison in Nashville, North Carolina.

== Personal life ==
Gibbs became a Baptist at the age of nine. He currently resides in Charlotte, North Carolina, with his wife Patricia, who is of Mexican descent. They had two sons, J. D. Gibbs and Coy Gibbs, and eight grandchildren, including Ty Gibbs. His son J. D. died on January 11, 2019, after a long battle with neurological brain disease diagnosed in 2015, while his other son, Coy, died in his sleep on November 6, 2022. His grandsons Jackson and Ty both work for his team. Jackson played college football at UCLA and Appalachian State, and Miller also played football at Appalachian State. Jackson is currently a pit crew member for Christopher Bell in the NASCAR Cup Series. Ty drives the No. 54 in the NASCAR Cup Series for JGR. Ty won the 2021 ARCA Menards Series championship and the 2022 NASCAR Xfinity Series championship. Gibbs became a limited partner of Harris Blitzer Sports & Entertainment (HBSE) upon their investment in Joe Gibbs Racing in 2023.

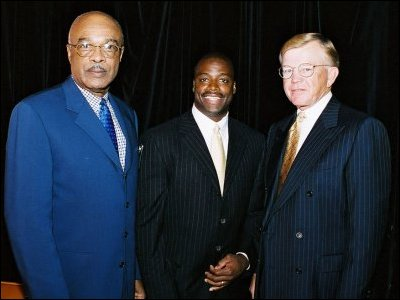
Former United States Secretary of Education Rod Paige, Pro Football Hall of Famer Darrell Green, and Gibbs in 2002

=== Politics ===
On September 5, 2008, Gibbs addressed the 2008 Republican National Convention, during which he offered his support for John McCain and his hope that the McCain–Palin ticket would lead to a 'spiritual awakening' in the United States. Gibbs has long been open about his Christian faith, but notoriously reserved about articulating his political positions, because, as the old Washington joke goes, "The Redskins are the only thing that unites the town." As one of the most sought after A-List figures in Washington social circles for over a quarter-century (and even being referred to as "the most popular man in Washington" by the Washington Post), Gibbs admitted being uneasy addressing the convention, stating that it was "a little awkward to put on a partisan hat."

== Head coaching record ==
Team	Year	Regular season					Postseason			
Team	Year	Won	Lost	Ties	Win %	Finish	Won	Lost	Win %	Result
WAS	1981	8	8	0	.500	4th in NFC East	—	—	—	—
WAS	1982	8	1	0	.889	1st in NFC	4	0	1.000	Super Bowl XVII champions
WAS	1983	14	2	0	.875	1st in NFC East	2	1	.667	Lost to Los Angeles Raiders in Super Bowl XVIII
WAS	1984	11	5	0	.687	1st in NFC East	0	1	.000	Lost to Chicago Bears in NFC Divisional Game
WAS	1985	10	6	0	.625	3rd in NFC East	—	—	—	—
WAS	1986	12	4	0	.750	2nd in NFC East	2	1	.667	Lost to New York Giants in NFC Championship Game
WAS	1987	11	4	0	.733	1st in NFC East	3	0	1.000	Super Bowl XXII champions
WAS	1988	7	9	0	.438	3rd in NFC East	—	—	—	—
WAS	1989	10	6	0	.625	3rd in NFC East	—	—	—	—
WAS	1990	10	6	0	.625	3rd in NFC East	1	1	.500	Lost to San Francisco 49ers in NFC Divisional Game
WAS	1991	14	2	0	.875	1st in NFC East	3	0	1.000	Super Bowl XXVI champions
WAS	1992	9	7	0	.562	3rd in NFC East	1	1	.500	Lost to San Francisco 49ers in NFC Divisional Game
WAS	2004	6	10	0	.375	4th in NFC East	—	—	—	—
WAS	2005	10	6	0	.625	2nd in NFC East	1	1	.500	Lost to Seattle Seahawks in NFC Divisional Game
WAS	2006	5	11	0	.312	4th in NFC East	—	—	—	—
WAS	2007	9	7	0	.562	3rd in NFC East	0	1	.000	Lost to Seattle Seahawks in NFC Wild Card Game
Total		154	94	0	.621		17	7	.708	

== Awards and honors ==
NFL

- Three-time Super Bowl champion (1982, 1987, 1991)
- Two-time NFL Coach of the Year (1982, 1983)
- NFL 100 All-Time Team

NASCAR

- Five-time NASCAR Cup Series champion (as owner of Joe Gibbs Racing)
- Four-time NASCAR Xfinity Series champion (as owner of Joe Gibbs Racing)

Halls of Fame

- Pro Football Hall of Fame (1996)
- Washington Ring of Fame
- NASCAR Hall of Fame (2020)

State/local

- Coach Gibbs Drive, a street leading to Washington's practice facility in Ashburn, Virginia

== Writing career ==
In 1992, Gibbs co-authored Joe Gibbs: Fourth and One, and in 2003, he co-authored Racing to Win. The books resemble a business and life how-to book and motivational guide as he discusses his successes and mistakes in his career, offering the lessons he learned as tips to the readers. In 2009, Gibbs wrote the book Game Plan for Life which discusses his life in football; how his religious faith can help others and outside of sports, as well as key topics that are important to people trying to lead a contemporary Christian lifestyle.

== See also ==
- List of NFL head coach wins leaders
- List of members of the NASCAR Hall of Fame
