= Theodore Robinson (disambiguation) =

Theodore Robinson (1852–1896) was an American painter.

Theodore Robinson may also refer to:

- Theodore Robinson (archer), British Olympic archer.
- Theodore Robinson (cricketer) (1866–1959), English cricketer
- Theodore Douglas Robinson (1883–1934), American politician and member of the Roosevelt family
- Theodore Henry Robinson (1881–1964), British biblical scholar

== See also ==
- Ted Robinson (disambiguation)
