= Trips formation =

American football offensive formation

Shotgun, trips right

A trips formation is an offensive football formation, initially used by Joe Gibbs and the Washington Redskins, in which three receivers line up on the same side of the field. The side is usually specified by the quarterback calling "Trips right" or "Trips left" when he calls the play in the huddle.

There are multiple variables of the trips formation, and it may be combined with other types of formations. For example, the call "Shotgun, trips right, slot left" formation would indicate that the tight end and two wide receivers would line up on the right side of the field, while two receivers would line up on the left side of the field (one "wide", the other slightly off the line of scrimmage in the "slot"). The quarterback would line up at least five yards behind the center.

The objective of a trips formation is to flood the defense on one side of the field in order to create and exploit holes in zone pass coverage.

== See also ==
- American football strategy
