= Edward Robinson (cricketer) =

English cricketer

Edward Robinson (27 December 1862 – 3 September 1942) was an English amateur first-class cricketer, who played one match for Yorkshire County Cricket Club in 1887, against Middlesex at Lord's.

Born in Honley, near Holmfirth, Yorkshire, England, Robinson was a right-handed batsman who scored 0 and 23 not out, as Middlesex won the match by six wickets.

Robinson died in September 1942, in Clifton, Bristol, England.
