= Phipps & Robinson =

- Occupation: Silversmiths

Phipps & Robinson were London silversmiths, Thomas Phipps (?-1823) and Edward Robinson (?-1816), with premises at 40, Gutter Lane. They produced mostly fine boxes (snuff boxes, nutmeg graters and vinaigrettes) in silver and gold, but also wine "labels" (actually, tags on chains, to hang around the bottles), knife stands, apple corers, hearing trumpets and other domestic items.
