= Ted Robinson (American football) =

American football player and coach

Biographical details
- Born: August 14, 1904
- Died: February 25, 1972; Chicago, Illinois, U.S.

Playing career
- 1923–1925: Oberlin

Coaching career (HC unless noted)
- 1926: Morehouse

Head coaching record
- Overall: 2–5–1

Theodore Thomas Robinson (August 14, 1904 – February 25, 1972) was an American lawyer and college football player and coach. He served as the head football coach at Morehouse College in 1926.

== Biography ==
Robinson graduated from Oberlin College in 1926. His parents were William F. and Margaret Gayters Robinson. His mother attended the academy in 1890–91. He majored in political science, was a letterman in track, played on the football team and was president of the Liberal Club.

After teaching political science and physical education at Morehouse College for two years, he enrolled in law school, receiving the J.D. from Chicago in 1931. He married Leya Sorkin in 1930 and practiced law from 1931 to 1940. From then until 1967 he was employed by the Illinois State Labor Department. He was licensed to practice before the U.S. Supreme Court.

Robinson was attorney for, and four times president of, the York Center Community Cooperative, a 72-family community residential cooperative in DuPage County, Illinois. He was a long-time resident of the community and had been a member since 1947. He was a member of the Chicago Federation of Labor and Industrial Union Council (AFL-CIO), the Northeast Illinois Planning Commission (which awarded him a citation of personal appreciation in 1968), the Jewish Labor Committee, the Metropolitan Housing and Planning Council, the board of the Illinois Chapter of the American Civil Liberties Union, and the American Federation of State, County and Municipal Employees Local 1006. His death closed an active, 30-year career of interest and service in the areas of civil liberties, labor, housing and employment. Since 1967 he had served the United States Department of Housing and Urban Development (HUD) in its Model Cities program in many capacities including supervisor of field operations and finally as acting assistant regional administrator of HUD for the Midwest area.

== Awards and recognitions ==
Robinson received HUD's Distinguished Service Award in 1970, a 25-year service award from the state of Illinois as an employee in the Employment Security Program (1964), three citations for outstanding participation in Chicago and Illinois Crusades for Mercy, the Philip Murray Award from the Chicago Industrial Union Council (CIO) in 1953, and the 1956 award for "Champion Fighter for a Better Chicago."

== Head coaching record ==
Year	Team	Overall	Conference	Standing	Bowl/playoffs
Morehouse Maroon Tigers (Southern Intercollegiate Athletic Conference) (1926)
1926	Morehouse	2–5–1	1–4–1	9th	
Morehouse:		2–5–1	1–4–1		
Total:		2–5–1			
