= Hail Varsity =

Fight song of the University of Nebraska–Lincoln

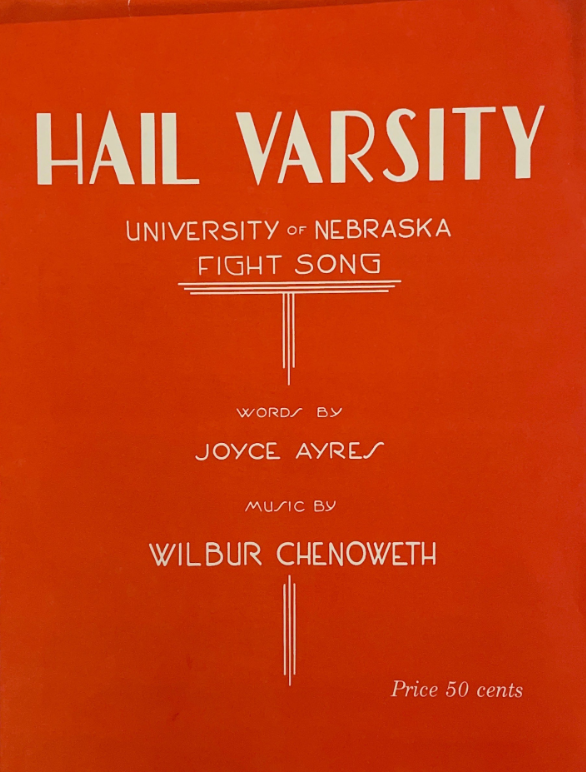
- Sheet music cover
- Fight song of the University of Nebraska–Lincoln
- Lyrics: W. Joyce Ayres, 1936
- Music: Wilbur Chenoweth, 1936
- Adopted: 1937

"Hail Varsity" is the fight song of the University of Nebraska–Lincoln, composed by Wilbur Chenoweth and written by Joyce Ayres in 1936. It is frequently featured at university events and is played by the Cornhusker Marching Band following Nebraska touchdowns.

== History ==
Prior to 1936, the University of Nebraska used a series of unofficial fights songs, most notably "Dear Old Nebraska U." Fans lamented the lack of a song to "express Cornhusker determination and victory spirit," noting similar schools with long-established fight songs. Music professor Wilber Chenoweth was commissioned to compose a new university song in the early 1930s. He wrote the score on a train returning to Lincoln from California and suggested alumnus W. Joyce Ayres write the lyrics.

Hail Varsity was first performed by the Men's Glee Club on November 21, 1936, at NU's annual Kosmet Klub Fall Revue, a student skit contest. The debut was met with praise and prompted the Lincoln Journal Star to call Hail Varsity "the new Nebraska song." The Men's Glee Club performed the song throughout the winter of 1937 and it became clear Hail Varsity was likely to be adopted in an official capacity. School newspaper The Daily Nebraskan urged students to learn the lyrics to recite at football games. The Innocents Society proclaimed Hail Varsity "the Nebraska song" early in 1937.

Despite the initial fervor, "Hail Varsity" was played sparingly through the 1940s and 1950s. Leading into the 1955 Orange Bowl, when administrators realized major broadcast networks each recognized a different Nebraska fight song, the Alumni Association, Athletic Department, and Board of Regents agreed to make the usage of Hail Varsity official.

The university recognizes four other fight songs: Dear Old Nebraska U, "March of the Cornhuskers," "The Cornhuskers (Come a Runnin' Boys)," and "Mr. Touchdown, U.S.A." A fifth, "Band Song," is typically played as a lead-in to Hail Varsity.

=== Band Song ===
Nebraska played the 1941 Rose Bowl, the program's first bowl game, during a nationwide boycott of the American Society of Composers, Authors, and Publishers. ASCAP prohibited any song it licensed, including Hail Varsity, from being played publicly after January 1, so members of the Cornhusker Marching Band composed "Band Song" while on the train to Pasadena. The music was based on "Song of the Vagabonds" from The Vagabond King and the lyrics were written as a reference the band's upcoming performance in the Rose Parade.

Band Song is now typically performed as a prelude to Hail Varsity.

== Lyrics ==
Hail the mighty team who fight to win for the scarlet and the cream;
For varsity and victory,
The mighty men who wear the 'N' still hold the key.
Halt the stalwart foes;
Keep up the fight till the final whistle blows.
Huskers, cheer for the Huskers to cinch the game and raise their fame the victory way.
The stands will sway, the band will play.
So carry on, we want to win today.

Chorus

Hail to the team.
The stadium rings as everyone sings the scarlet and cream.
Cheers for a victory
Echo our loyalty;
So on mighty men,
The eyes of the land upon every hand are looking at you.
Fight on to victory,
Hail to the men of Nebraska U.

As the song is typically performed in short bursts, most fans today are unaware of the lyrics outside of the chorus. The lyrics have been slightly altered over the years – Chenoweth and Ayres themselves published an updated version in 1945, designed to be easier to sing. This version shortened the second and sixth lines of the chorus and changed the final line to "hail, mighty men."

In 2023, the university created a new version of the song intended for use at women's sporting events, replacing references to "mighty men" with "U of N."

== Other uses ==
Hail Varsity, a monthly print magazine covering Nebraska athletics, was published from 2012 until 2023. A restaurant run by the magazine, Hail Varsity Club, opened in La Vista in 2022 and was rebranded the following year.
