= Dear Old Nebraska U =

Fight song of the University of Nebraska–Lincoln

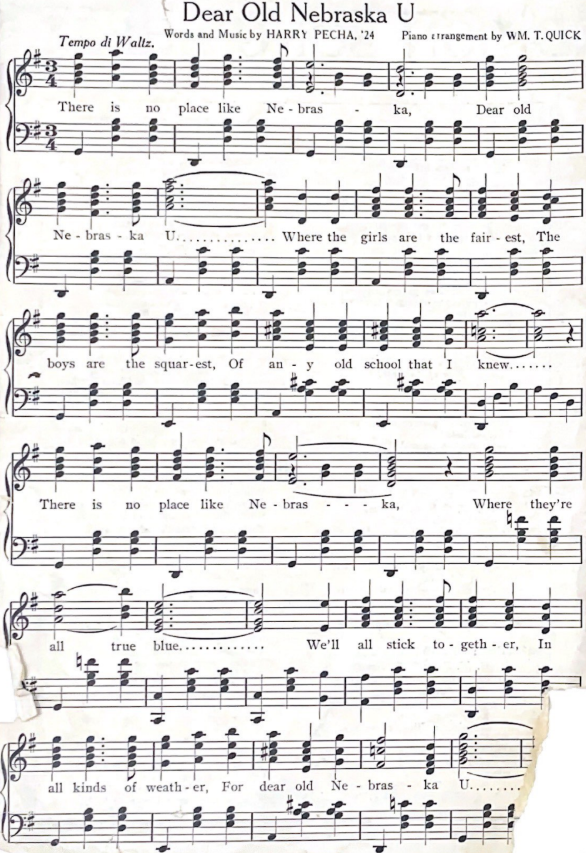
- Sheet music
- Fight song of the University of Nebraska–Lincoln
- Lyrics: Harry Pecha, 1923
- Music: Harry Pecha, 1923

"Dear Old Nebraska U" (often referred to as "There Is No Place Like Nebraska") is a fight song of the University of Nebraska–Lincoln written and composed by Harry Pecha in 1923. It is frequently featured at university events and is played by the Cornhusker Marching Band following Nebraska touchdowns, typically after "Hail Varsity."

== History ==
"Dear Old Nebraska U" was composed and written by student Harry Pecha while attending an Army Reserve Officers' Training Corps camp at Fort Snelling in 1923. Nebraska attributes the song to Pecha, but other schools use similar tunes, often with similar lyrics. It was originally written in 3/4 time, but was soon adapted to 2/4 to better suit it for marching.

"Dear Old Nebraska U" was used as the school's primary fight song until "Hail Varsity" was composed and written in 1936. The Daily Nebraskan suggested the university had "long lacked a song able to express Cornhusker determination and victory spirit" and strongly encouraged students to learn the lyrics to "Hail Varsity", which was adopted by the Innocents Society as the school's official fight song in 1937. "Dear Old Nebraska U" was later officially adopted as well.

The song is often referred to by its opening line, "There is No Place Like Nebraska." The university recognizes three other fight songs in addition to "Dear Old Nebraska U" and "Hail Varsity": "March of the Cornhuskers," "The Cornhuskers (Come a Runnin' Boys)," and "Mr. Touchdown, U.S.A." A fourth, "Band Song," is typically played as a lead-in to "Hail Varsity".

== Lyrics ==
There is no place like Nebraska
Dear old Nebraska U.
Where the girls are the fairest,
The boys are the squarest
Of any old school that I knew.
There is no place like Nebraska,
Where they're all true blue.
We'll all stick together,
In all kinds of weather,
For dear old Nebraska U.

It is unclear why the University of Nebraska became "NU" (or "Nebraska U") instead of "UN." The school was referred to as NU long before "Dear Old Nebraska U" was written, and while several schools of the former Big Eight Conference also use this nomenclature (Colorado as CU, Kansas as KU, and Oklahoma as OU), each began at different times and with no clear connection.

== Other uses ==
Lincoln-based Zipline Brewing Company sold "Dear Old Nebraska Brew," an American lager brewed in collaboration with the Nebraska Alumni Association.
