= Mr. Touchdown, U.S.A. =

Song by Ruth Roberts

- Cover of the 1950 sheet music

Song
- Written: 1950
- Composer: Ruth Roberts
- Lyricists: Gene Piller, Bill Katz

Audio sample
- An excerpt of Winterhalter's 1950 recording: file; help

"Mr. Touchdown, U.S.A." is a stadium anthem, novelty song, and jazz march by American songwriter Ruth Roberts. First recorded by Hugo Winterhalter in 1950, it became one of the most frequently heard songs on American radio during that year's college football season. It was later covered by a number of other artists, including Percy Faith and The Crew-Cuts. Lyrically associated with gridiron football, it is a staple in the repertoire of some college and high school marching bands and is particularly associated with the University of Nebraska–Lincoln.

== Background ==
=== Composition ===
"Mr. Touchdown, U.S.A." is an energetic jazz march composed in 1950 by Ruth Roberts with her husband Gene Piller and long-time collaborator William "Bill" Katz, who later collaborated to write the New York Mets tribute song "Meet the Mets." It has been described as musically and thematically similar to the 1933 song "You Gotta Be a Football Hero".

=== Lyrics ===
The song's lyrics are typical of those of American university fight songs, and communicate what Frank Hoffmann has described as "an adolescent manner of praising the power of the football team". They tell of the athletic exploits of an eponymous, fictional character known by the moniker "Mr. Touchdown" who will unfailingly run touchdowns if given a pigskin. In the bridge, the lyrics recall Mr. Touchdown's triumphs over specific college football teams, such as describing "the day he murdered Minnesota", how he "took Wisconsin's white and red and made it black and blue instead", and declaring that "what he did to Arkansas should happen to your mother-in-law".

== Recording and release ==
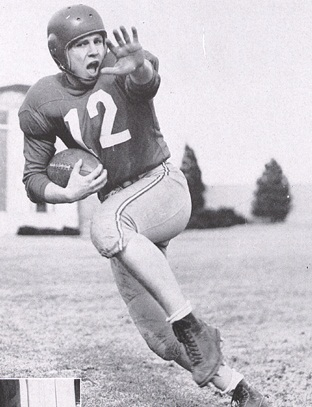
Bobby Reynolds became known as Mr. Touchdown after winning an RCA contest organized as part of its promotion of "Mr. Touchdown, U.S.A."

Hugo Winterhalter's 1950 recording of the song was released as a single in September 1950, with the album's B side a performance of the patriotic, anti-communist song "The Red We Want is the Red We've Got". In the November 25, 1950, issue of Billboard, "Mr. Touchdown, U.S.A" was listed among the ten most played songs on American radio.

=== Promotion ===
To promote the song's debut, RCA offered a prize of a television set and a silver-plated album of Winterhalter's recording to the college football player who scored the most touchdowns during the 1950 football season; as part of the promotion, albums of "Mr. Touchdown, U.S.A." were sent to sports reporters at American newspapers. Nebraska's Bobby Reynolds scored twenty-two touchdowns to claim the prize, which was presented to him by Winterhalter in February 1951. Reynolds became known as "Mr. Touchdown."

== Performances and cultural influence ==
"Mr. Touchdown, U.S.A." was covered by The Crew-Cuts on their 1956 album On the Campus, and by Percy Faith on his 1958 album Touchdown! It was performed during pre-game ceremonies of Super Bowl III in 1969 and is a regular number in the University of Nebraska Cornhusker Marching Band's pregame shows, played between the "Star-Spangled Banner" and "March of the Cornhuskers". It has also been performed by the marching bands of the University of Michigan and other universities and high schools.

In 2020, Yardbarker named "Mr. Touchdown, U.S.A." second on a list of the "25 best songs about sports"; in September 2018, it was named by the Daily Mississippian to its "playlist of the week".

The song is part of the soundtrack to the 1984 film Revenge of the Nerds.
