= List of Sigma Gamma Epsilon chapters =

Sigma Gamma Epsilon is a national honor society for earth sciences. It was formed in 1915 at the University of Kansas. In the following list of chapters, active chapters are indicated in bold and inactive chapters are in italics.

Chapters	Charter date and range	Institution	City	State	Status	Ref.
**Alpha**	March 30, 1915	University of Kansas	Lawrence	Kansas	Active	
Beta	December 13, 1915 – 19xx ?	University of Pittsburgh	Pittsburgh	Pennsylvania	Inactive	
Gamma	May 16, 1916 – xxxx ?	University of Oklahoma	Norman	Oklahoma	Inactive	
Delta	March 3, 1917 – 1970s	University of Nebraska–Lincoln	Lincoln	Nebraska	Inactive	
Epsilon	March 22, 1919 – 1939	University of Missouri	Columbia	Missouri	Inactive	
Zeta	April 30, 1920 – xxxx ?	University of Texas at Austin	Austin	Texas	Inactive	
**Eta**	January 8, 1921 – 1926, 1951	Missouri University of Science and Technology	Rolla	Missouri	Active	(Note: The charter of Eta chapter was revoked in 1926.)
Theta	May 10, 1921 – xxxx ?	Cornell University	Ithaca	New York	Inactive	
**Iota**	June 4, 1921 – 19xx ?; xxxx ?	University of Michigan	Ann Arbor	Michigan	Active	
Kappa	January 21, 1922 – 19xx ?	Pennsylvania State University	University Park	Pennsylvania	Inactive	
Lambda	January 21, 1922 – xxxx ?	Colorado School of Mines	Golden	Colorado	Inactive	
Mu	April 18, 1922 – 19xx ?	University of Utah	Salt Lake City	Utah	Inactive	
Nu	December 2, 1922 – 19xx ?	University of Minnesota	Minneapolis	Minnesota	Inactive	
**Xi**	May 3, 1924 – 19xx ?; 201x?	Washington State University	Pullman	Washington	Active	
Omicron	May 7, 1924 – 1940	University of California, Berkeley	Berkeley	California	Inactive	(Note: Omicron chapter was noted as inactive at the 11th National Convention in December 1937 but its charter was not revoked at that time as it was decided that it had the potential to rebound.)
Pi	December 18, 1924 – 1937	University of Nevada, Reno	Reno	Nevada	Inactive	(Note: Baird's 20th edition (1991) notes that Pi chapter went dormant in 1936. The chapter's charter was revoked for inactivity at the 11th National Convention in December 1937.)
**Rho**	January 15, 1926	Indiana University Bloomington	Bloomington	Indiana	Active	
Tau	April 25, 1926 – 1947	George Washington University	Washington, D.C.	District of Columbia	Inactive	
**Sigma**	April 26, 1926 – 19xx; xxxx ?	Ohio State University	Columbus	Ohio	Active	
**Upsilon**	May 27, 1927 – xxxx; 201x ?	West Virginia University	Morgantown	West Virginia	Active	
Phi	May 10, 1928 – 1940	Colgate University	Hamilton	New York	Inactive	(Note: At the 1937 convention, it was noted that the Phi chapter had been inactive for some time but it was believed it had the potential to rebound. The chapter's charter was revoked for inactivity at the 12th National Convention in March 1940.)
**Chi**	May 10, 1928	University of Kentucky	Lexington	Kentucky	Active	
Psi	May 28, 1929 – 19xx ?	University of Idaho	Moscow	Idaho	Inactive	
**Omega**	November 19, 1932	University of Southern California	Los Angeles	California	Active	
**Alpha Gamma**	January 19, 1932 – 1947; 20xx ?	University of California, Los Angeles	Los Angeles	California	Active	
**Alpha Alpha**	April 3, 1932 – 197x ?; 2012	University of North Carolina at Chapel Hill	Chapel Hill	North Carolina	Active	
**Alpha Beta**	June 4, 1932	Texas Tech University	Lubbock	Texas	Active	
Alpha Delta	March 26, 1932 – 19xx ?	University of Cincinnati	Cincinnati	Ohio	Inactive	
Alpha Epsilon colony	Never installed	University of Washington	Seattle	Washington	Inactive	(Note: The Alpha Epsilon colony was created by absorbing the local Ammonite Club. Because of the Great Depression, this colony never reached the financial strength needed for installation.)
Alpha Eta	June 1, 1934 – 19xx ?	University of Colorado Boulder	Boulder	Colorado	Inactive	
Alpha Zeta	June 2, 1934 – 1953	Oregon State University	Corvallis	Oregon	Inactive	
Alpha Theta	November 23, 1934 – xxxx ?	Miami University	Oxford	Ohio	Inactive	
Alpha Iota	June 3, 1938 – xxxx ?	Augustana College	Rock Island	Illinois	Inactive	(Note: Alpha Iota chapter formed by absorbing the Udden Geology Club of Augustana College.)
Alpha Kappa	October 1, 1939 – 1947	Johns Hopkins University	Baltimore	Maryland	Inactive	
**Alpha Lambda**	March 16, 1940	University of Texas at El Paso	El Paso	Texas	Active	
**Alpha Mu**	April 3, 1942 – 19xx ?; xxxx ?	Ohio State University	Blacksburg	Virginia	Active	
Alpha Nu	April 26, 1947 – xxxx ?	Kansas State University	Manhattan	Kansas	Inactive	
Alpha Xi	June 10, 1947 – 1948	University of Chicago	Chicago	Illinois	Inactive	
Alpha Omicron colony	Never installed				Inactive	
Alpha Pi colony	Never installed				Inactive	
Alpha Sigma	May 14, 1948 – xxxx ?	Brigham Young University	Provo	Utah	Inactive	
Alpha Rho	June 5, 1948 – 19xx ?	Michigan State University	East Lansing	Michigan	Inactive	
**Alpha Upsilon**	May 27, 1948	Mississippi State University	Starkville	Mississippi	Active	
Alpha Tau	May 29, 1949 – 19xx ?	Emory University	Atlanta	Georgia	Inactive	
Alpha Phi	April 2, 1949	Purdue University	West Lafayette	Indiana	Inactive	
Alpha Chi	April 30, 1949	University of Alabama	Tuscaloosa	Alabama	Inactive	
**Alpha Psi**	May 12, 1949	University of Arkansas	Fayetteville	Arkansas	Active	
Alpha Omega	May 13, 1949	Oklahoma State University–Stillwater	Stillwater	Oklahoma	Inactive	
Beta Beta	April 29, 1950 – 1995	Upsala College	East Orange	New Jersey	Inactive	
Beta Alpha	May 5, 1950 – 1955	University of Washington	Seattle	Washington	Inactive	
Beta Epsilon	May 20, 1950 – xxxx ?	Centenary College of Louisiana	Shreveport	Louisiana	Inactive	
Beta Gamma	May 22, 1950 – xxxx ?	Utah State University	Logan	Utah	Inactive	
Beta Delta	May 26, 1950 – 19xx ?	Montana State University	Missoula	Montana	Inactive	
**Beta Zeta**	October 21, 1950	University of North Dakota	Grand Forks	North Dakota	Active	
Beta Eta	November 1, 1950 – xxxx ?	Tulane University	New Orleans	Louisiana	Inactive	
**Beta Iota**	May 23, 1951 – xxxx ?; 201x ?	University of Houston	Houston	Texas	Active	
**Beta Theta**	March 29, 1951 – 202 ?	University of Massachusetts Amherst	Amherst	Massachusetts	Active	
Beta Kappa	May 22, 1952 – 19xx ?	University of Virginia	Charlottesville	Virginia	Inactive	
Beta Lambda	May 16, 1953 – 19xx ?	University of Tulsa	Tulsa	Oklahoma	Inactive	
Beta Mu	May 18, 1953 – xxxx ?	University of New Mexico	Albuquerque	New Mexico	Inactive	
Beta Nu	May 28, 1954 – xxxx ?	University of Louisiana at Lafayette	Lafayette	Louisiana	Inactive	
Beta Xi	April 22, 1955 – 19xx ?	Louisiana Tech University	Ruston	Louisiana	Inactive	
Beta Omicron	May 21, 1955 – xxxx ?	University of Redlands	Redlands	California	Inactive	
Beta Rho	January 10, 1957 – 19xx ?	Michigan Technological University	Houghton	Michigan	Inactive	
**Beta Pi**	February 7, 1957 – 19xx ?; xxxx ?	Cornell College	Mount Vernon	Iowa	Active	
Beta Sigma	March 23, 1958 – xxxx ?	Rice University	Houston	Texas	Inactive	
Beta Tau	April 11, 1959 – xxxx ?	University of Arizona	Tucson	Arizona	Inactive	
**Beta Upsilon**	April 26, 1959 – 19xx ?; 1967	Bowling Green State University	Bowling Green	Ohio	Active	
Beta Phi	March 9, 1960 – 19xx ?	Southern Arkansas University	Magnolia	Arkansas	Inactive	
Beta Chi	April 1, 1960 – xxxx ?	Arizona State University	Tempe	Arizona	Inactive	
**Beta Psi**	May 5, 1962	University of Florida	Gainesville	Florida	Active	
**Beta Omega**	February 13, 1965	University of Texas at Arlington	Arlington	Texas	Active	
Gamma Alpha	November 13, 1966 – xxxx ?	University of Wisconsin–Superior	Superior	Wisconsin	Inactive	
Gamma Beta	December 16, 1966 – xxxx ?	Wichita State University	Wichita	Kansas	Inactive	
Gamma Gamma	January 14, 1967 – xxxx ?	University of Tennessee	Knoxville	Tennessee	Inactive	
**Gamma Zeta**	March 7, 1968	Kent State University	Kent	Ohio	Active	
Gamma Delta	March 22, 1968 – xxxx ?	Northern Arizona University	Flagstaff	Arizona	Inactive	
**Gamma Epsilon**	March 22, 1968 – 1998; Spring 2017	Texas A&M University–Commerce	Commerce	Texas	Active	
Gamma Eta	October 27, 1968 – xxxx ?	University of Toledo	Toledo	Ohio	Inactive	
Gamma Theta	April 12, 1969 – xxxx ?	University of Iowa	Iowa City	Iowa	Inactive	
Gamma Iota	March 20, 1970 – xxxx ?	University of Louisiana at Monroe	Monroe	Louisiana	Inactive	
**Gamma Kappa**	March 18, 1971	Albion College	Albion	Michigan	Active	
**Gamma Lambda**	May 20, 1972 – xxxx ?; 20xx ?	Indiana State University	Terre Haute	Indiana	Active	
Gamma Mu	July 21, 1972 – xxxx ?	University of Mississippi	University	Mississippi	Inactive	
Gamma Nu	November 1, 1972 – xxxx ?	University of Nevada, Las Vegas	Las Vegas	Nevada	Inactive	
**Gamma Omicron**	December 4, 1972	University of New Orleans	New Orleans	Louisiana	Active	
Gamma Xi	April 11, 1973 – 19xx ?	Texas A&M University	College Station	Texas	Inactive	
Gamma Pi	October 12, 1973 – xxxx ?	Chadron State College	Chadron	Nebraska	Inactive	
**Gamma Rho**	January 18, 1974	Boise State University	Boise	Idaho	Active	
**Gamma Sigma**	February 14, 1974	University of Northern Iowa	Cedar Falls	Iowa	Active	
Gamma Tau	April 23, 1974 – 19xx ?	New Mexico Highlands University	Las Vegas	New Mexico	Inactive	
**Gamma Upsilon**	April 23, 1974 – 197x ?; February 2013	West Texas A&M University	Canyon	Texas	Active	
**Gamma Phi**	May 3, 1974	Stephen F. Austin State University	Nacogdoches	Texas	Active	
**Gamma Chi**	December 13, 1974	Eastern Illinois University	Charleston	Illinois	Active	
Gamma Psi	February 27, 1975 – xxxx ?	Western Carolina University	Cullowhee	North Carolina	Inactive	
Gamma Omega	April 4, 1975 – xxxx ?	New Mexico State University	Las Cruces	New Mexico	Inactive	
**Delta Alpha**	May 19, 1975	College of William & Mary	Williamsburg	Virginia	Active	
**Delta Beta**	May 29, 1975	Auburn University	Auburn	Alabama	Active	
Delta Gamma	September 30, 1975	Washington University in St. Louis	St. Louis	Missouri	Inactive	
Delta Delta	May 4, 1976	Nicholls State University	Thibodaux	Louisiana	Inactive	
**Delta Epsilon**	May 14, 1976	Wright State University	Dayton	Ohio	Active	
Delta Zeta	November 18, 1976 – xxxx ?	Indiana University of Pennsylvania	Indiana	Pennsylvania	Inactive	
**Delta Eta**	November 18, 1976	University of South Alabama	Mobile	Alabama	Active	
**Delta Theta**	April 7, 1977	Rensselaer Polytechnic Institute	Troy	New York	Active	
Delta Iota	April 29, 1977	Louisiana State University	Baton Rouge	Louisiana	Inactive	
Delta Kappa	January 20, 1978	Iowa State University	Ames	Iowa	Inactive	
Delta Lambda	March 31, 1978	Ohio Wesleyan University	Delaware	Ohio	Inactive	
Delta Mu	April 7, 1978	Hardin–Simmons University	Abilene	Texas	Inactive	
Delta Nu	May 28, 1978	Stony Brook University	Stony Brook	New York	Inactive	
Delta Omicron	April 29, 1979 – xxxx ?	Hope College	Holland	Michigan	Inactive	
**Delta Xi**	May 2, 1980	Trinity University	San Antonio	Texas	Active	
Delta Pi	February 27, 1981 – xxxx ?	Waynesburg University	Waynesburg	Pennsylvania	Inactive	
**Delta Rho**	April 30, 1981	Sul Ross State University	Alpine	Texas	Active	
Delta Sigma	May 1, 1981 – xxxx ?	University of Arkansas at Monticello	Monticello	Arkansas	Inactive	
Delta Upsilon	May 8, 1981 – xxxx ?	New Mexico Institute of Mining and Technology	Socorro	New Mexico	Inactive	
**Delta Tau**	November 5, 1981	Slippery Rock University	Slippery Rock	Pennsylvania	Active	
Delta Phi	February 23, 1982 – xxxx ?	Stanford University	Stanford	California	Inactive	
**Delta Chi**	April 1, 1982	Eastern Kentucky University	Richmond	Kentucky	Active	
**Delta Psi**	April 30, 1982	Western Illinois University	Macomb	Illinois	Active	
Delta Omega	December 3, 1982 – xxxx ?	Missouri State University	Springfield	Missouri	Inactive	
Epsilon Alpha	February 22, 1983 – xxxx ?	University of Mary Washington	Fredericksburg	Virginia	Inactive	
**Epsilon Beta**	February 25, 1983	Ohio University	Athens	Ohio	Active	
**Epsilon Gamma**	March 18, 1983	Purdue University Fort Wayne	Fort Wayne	Indiana	Active	
Epsilon Delta	April 5, 1983 – xxxx ?	Texas Christian University	Fort Worth	Texas	Inactive	
Epsilon Epsilon	May 12, 1983 – xxxx ?	Murray State University	Murray	Kentucky	Inactive	
**Epsilon Zeta**	November 11, 1983	Midwestern State University	Wichita Falls	Texas	Active	
**Epsilon Eta**	December 12, 1983	Radford University	Radford	Virginia	Active	
Epsilon Iota	December 13, 1983 – xxxx ?	DePauw University	Greencastle	Indiana	Inactive	
**Epsilon Theta**	February 24, 1984	Northwest Missouri State University	Maryville	Missouri	Active	
Epsilon Kappa	May 4, 1984 – xxxx ?	Central Michigan University	Mount Pleasant	Michigan	Inactive	
Epsilon Lambda	October 4, 1984 – xxxx ?	Rider University	Lawrence	New Jersey	Inactive	
**Epsilon Mu**	October 5, 1984	Rutgers University–Newark	Newark	New Jersey	Active	
**Epsilon Nu**	November 13, 1984	University of Massachusetts Lowell	Lowell	Massachusetts	Active	
Epsilon Xi	February 7, 1985 – xxxx ?	Duke University	Durham	North Carolina	Inactive	
Epsilon Omicron	April 15, 1985 – xxxx ?	George Mason University	Fairfax	Virginia	Inactive	
Epsilon Pi	October 10, 1985 – xxxx ?	McNeese State University	Lake Charles	Louisiana	Inactive	
Epsilon Rho	October 17, 1985 – xxxx ?	Georgia State University	Atlanta	Georgia	Inactive	
Epsilon Sigma	October 18, 1985 – xxxx ?	University of North Carolina at Charlotte	Charlotte	North Carolina	Inactive	
Epsilon Tau	November 5, 1985 – xxxx ?	University of Maryland, College Park	College Park	Maryland	Inactive	
Epsilon Upsilon	November 18, 1985 – xxxx ?	Brooklyn College	Brooklyn	New York	Inactive	
**Epsilon Phi**	November 20, 1981	East Carolina University	Greenville	North Carolina	Active	
Epsilon Chi	February 26, 1986 – xxxx ?	Old Dominion University	Norfolk	Virginia	Inactive	
**Epsilon Psi**	March 25, 1986	University of Miami	Coral Gables	Florida	Active	
**Epsilon Omega**	May 9, 1986 – xxxx ?; December 2021	University of Texas at San Antonio	San Antonio	Texas	Active	
**Zeta Alpha**	October 23, 1986	PennWest California	California	Pennsylvania	Active	
**Zeta Beta**	October 24, 1986	West Chester University	West Chester	Pennsylvania	Active	
**Zeta Zeta**	April 14, 1987 – xxxx ?; 20xx ?	College of Charleston	Charleston	South Carolina	Active	
**Zeta Epsilon**	April 26, 1987	PennWest Edinboro	Edinboro	Pennsylvania	Active	
Zeta Gamma	May 7, 1987 – xxxx ?	Binghamton University	Binghamton	New York	Inactive	
Zeta Delta	May 13, 1987 – xxxx ?	University of Texas Permian Basin	Odessa	Texas	Inactive	
Zeta Eta	May 11, 1989 – xxxx ?	Southern Illinois University Carbondale	Carbondale	Illinois	Inactive	
Zeta Theta	September 21, 1989 – xxxx ?	Fort Hays State University	Hays	Kansas	Inactive	
**Zeta Iota**	May 2, 1990	Bridgewater State University	Bridgewater	Massachusetts	Active	
**Zeta Kappa**	May 11, 1990	University of Wisconsin–Oshkosh	Oshkosh	Wisconsin	Active	
Zeta Lambda	June 7, 1990	Ashland University	Ashland	Ohio	Inactive	
Zeta Mu	April 18, 1991	Syracuse University	Syracuse	New York	Inactive	
**Zeta Nu**	April 19, 1991	Colorado Mesa University	Grand Junction	Colorado	Active	
Zeta Xi	May 5, 1991 – xxxx ?	Monmouth College	Monmouth	Illinois	Inactive	
**Zeta Omicron**	September 24, 1992 – 20xx ?; 201x ?	Millsaps College	Jackson	Mississippi	Active	
**Zeta Pi**	November 19, 1993 – xxxx ?; April 2017	Baylor University	Waco	Texas	Active	
**Zeta Rho**	December 3, 1993	State University of New York at Oneonta	Oneonta	New York	Active	
Zeta Sigma	December 10, 1993 – xxxx ?	Western Michigan University	Kalamazoo	Michigan	Inactive	
Zeta Tau	May 13, 1994 – xxxx ?	University of Wisconsin–Eau Claire	Eau Claire	Wisconsin	Inactive	
Zeta Upsilon	December 11, 1995 – xxxx ?	Long Island University CW Post Campus	Brookville	New York	Inactive	
**Zeta Phi**	December 12, 1995	University of Rochester	Rochester	New York	Active	
Zeta Chi	April 30, 1996 – xxxx ?	University at Buffalo	Buffalo	New York	Inactive	
Zeta Psi	May 3, 1996 – xxxx ?	University of South Florida	Tampa	Florida	Inactive	
Zeta Omega	June 4, 1996 – xxxx ?	University of Georgia	Athens	Georgia	Inactive	
**Eta Alpha**	April 3, 1997	University of Tennessee at Martin	Martin	Tennessee	Active	
**Eta Beta**	May 4, 1998	State University of New York at Potsdam	Potsdam	New York	Active	
**Eta Gamma**	December 8, 1998	Weber State University	Ogden	Utah	Active	
Eta Delta	February 5, 1999	Montana State University	Bozeman	Montana	Inactive	
**Eta Epsilon**	January 11, 2000	Southern Utah University	Cedar City	Utah	Active	
Eta Zeta	January 31, 2001 – 201x ?	Central Washington University	Ellensburg	Washington	Inactive	
Eta Eta	March 28, 2001 – 20xx ?	Texas A&M University–Corpus Christi	Corpus Christi	Texas	Inactive	
**Eta Theta**	April 12, 2002 – 20xx ?; 20xx ?	Florida Atlantic University	Boca Raton	Florida	Active	
Eta Iota	April 24, 2002 – 20xx ?	Muskingum University	New Concord	Ohio	Inactive	
**Eta Kappa**	May 12, 2003	University of Vermont	Burlington	Vermont	Active	
**Eta Mu**	September 13, 2003	Juniata College	Huntingdon	Pennsylvania	Active	
**Eta Lambda**	March 15, 2004	Susquehanna University	Selinsgrove	Pennsylvania	Active	
**Eta Nu**	April 25, 2004	James Madison University	Harrisonburg	Virginia	Active	
**Eta Xi**	March 31, 2006	St. Lawrence University	Canton	New York	Active	
Eta Omicron	May 5, 2006 – 20xx ?	University of Minnesota Duluth	Duluth	Minnesota	Inactive	
**Eta Pi**	May 8, 2006	University of Wisconsin–Parkside	Kenosha	Wisconsin	Active	
**Eta Rho**	April 25, 2007	State University of New York at Geneseo	Geneseo	New York	Active	
**Eta Sigma**	October 4, 2007	Middle Tennessee State University	Murfreesboro	Tennessee	Active	
**Eta Tau**	April 18, 2008	University of Dayton	Dayton	Ohio	Active	
**Eta Phi**	April 10, 2009	Northern Illinois University	DeKalb	Illinois	Active	
**Eta Upsilon**	May 1, 2009	University of the Pacific	Stockton	California	Active	
**Eta Chi**	May 11, 2009	SUNY Brockport	Brockport	New York	Active	
**Eta Psi**	November 13, 2009	Keene State College	Keene	New Hampshire	Active	
**Eta Omega**	February 9, 2011 – 201x; 20xx ?	University of Wisconsin–Whitewater	Whitewater	Wisconsin	Active	
**Theta Alpha**	March 22, 2011	Adrian College	Adrian	Michigan	Active	
**Theta Beta**	May 18, 2012	State University of New York at New Paltz	New Paltz	New York	Active	
**Theta Gamma**	May 2, 2012 – 201x ?; 202x ?	Angelo State University	San Angelo	Texas	Active	
**Theta Delta**	May 3, 2013	Columbus State University	Columbus	Georgia	Active	
**Theta Epsilon**	November 1, 2013	University of Massachusetts, Boston	Boston	Massachusetts	Active	
**Theta Zeta**	April 16, 2016	Central Connecticut State University	New Britain	Connecticut	Active	
**Theta Eta**	May 3, 2015	University of Puget Sound	Tacoma	Washington	Active	
**Theta Theta**	April 3, 2015	Concord University	Athens	West Virginia	Active	
Theta Iota colony	Never Installed	State University of New York at Oswego	Oswego	New York	Inactive	
**Theta Kappa**	201x ?	University of North Carolina Wilmington	Wilmington	North Carolina	Active	
**Theta Lambda**	May 6, 2016	Hofstra University	Hempstead	New York	Active	
**Theta Mu**	2016	University of West Georgia	Carrollton	Georgia	Active	
**Theta Nu**	201x ?	South Dakota School of Mines and Technology	Rapid City	South Dakota	Active	
**Theta Xi**	201x ?	Allegheny College	Meadville	Pennsylvania	Active	
**Theta Omicron**	2017	Indiana University Northwest	Gary	Indiana	Active	
**Theta Pi**	March 6, 2017	Florida State University	Tallahassee	Florida	Active	
**Theta Rho**	2017	Temple University	Philadelphia	Pennsylvania	Active	
**Theta Sigma**	September 2017	University of Arkansas at Little Rock	Little Rock	Arkansas	Active	
**Theta Tau**	201x ?	University of Oregon	Eugene	Oregon	Active	
**Theta Upsilon**	2018	Eastern Connecticut State University	Willimantic	Connecticut	Active	
**Theta Phi**	2018	Wesleyan University	Middletown	Connecticut	Active	
**Theta Chi**	April 12, 2018	Georgia Tech	Atlanta	Georgia	Active	
**Theta Psi**	2018	Westminster College	Salt Lake City	Utah	Active	
**Theta Omega**	2018	Tennessee Tech	Cookeville	Tennessee	Active	
**Iota Alpha**	April 23, 2019	Marietta College	Marietta	Ohio	Active	
**Iota Beta**	20xx ?	University of Tennessee at Chattanooga	Chattanooga	Tennessee	Active	
