= University of Nebraska Cornhusker Marching Band =

College marching band in Lincoln, Nebraska

- School: University of Nebraska–Lincoln
- Location: Lincoln, Nebraska
- Conference: Big Ten
- Founded: 1879; 147 years ago
- Director: Anthony Falcone
- Assistant Director: Douglas Bush
- Members: 300
- Fight song: "Dear Old Nebraska U" "Hail Varsity"

Uniform
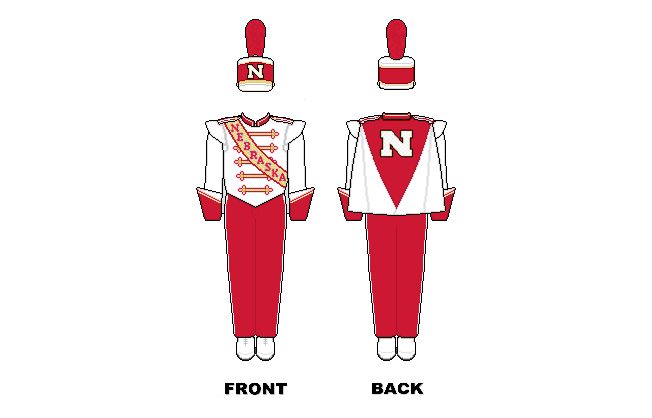
- Website: https://arts.unl.edu/music/CMB

The University of Nebraska Cornhusker Marching Band (commonly referred to as the Marching Red or The Pride of All Nebraska) is the marching band of the University of Nebraska–Lincoln, part of the Glenn Korff School of Music within the Hixson–Lied College of Fine and Performing Arts. Founded in 1879 as an Army Cadet band, the unit now consists of approximately 300 students. It performs at Memorial Stadium during football games, with a smaller pep band often used for other university events.

== History ==
The first University of Nebraska band was created in 1879 as an Army Cadet band under the direction of Lieutenant Isaac Webster. Twelve volunteer cadets, many with no musical background, accepted Webster's offer of free military uniforms for those willing to play in the new band. Eight years later, the band performed at its first athletic event, a baseball game against Kansas State.

In 1892, under the direction of future American Expeditionary Forces commander John J. Pershing, the band performed what may have been the first college football halftime show ever, though Pershing considered it a military exercise. Pershing believed collaboration between the band and the university's young football team, which shared a field, would be beneficial and draw larger audiences to both. This required a significant extension of the halftime interval, which at the time typically lasted less than five minutes. Throughout the 1890s, Pershing's cadet band marched the team from the train station back to campus when returning from victories, and began playing before and during halftime of football games. The cadet band existed until 1937, when it was disbanded and formally reorganized into the Cornhusker Marching Band under the leadership of a non-military band director (though for years prior, the band's director was often a professional musician given an honorary military title).

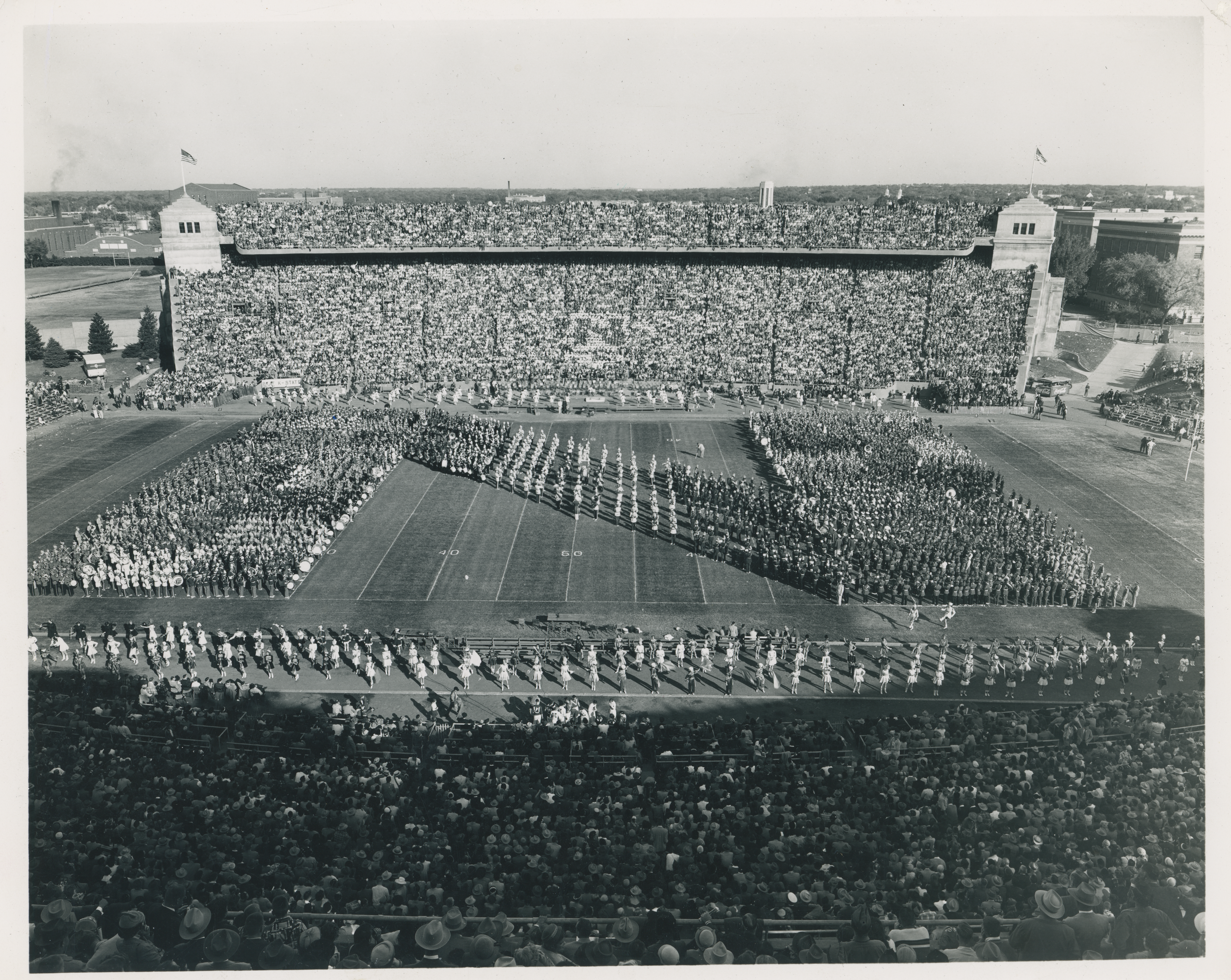
The Cornhusker Marching Band performs at Memorial Stadium in 1952

After Pershing's departure, Nebraska's band performed at the 1898 Trans-Mississippi Exposition in Omaha, and later at the 1904 Louisiana Purchase Exposition in St. Louis.

Harry Pecha wrote "Dear Old Nebraska U" in 1923, and it became unofficially adopted as the school's first fight song. Band director Billy Quick arranged the music, originally in 3/4 time, in 2/4 to better suit it for marching.

In 1927, famed composer John Philip Sousa performed in Lincoln with his military band to recognize Nebraska's ROTC band, which had frequently earned the highest rating given by the United States Department of War. At the request of chancellor Edgar A. Burnett, Sousa composed a march for the university band, titled simply "University of Nebraska March." Sousa's march was often featured during halftime performances until being retired in 2013. Sousa's visit was so well-received that the university began hosting "Band Day," inviting high school bands from across Nebraska and Iowa to perform – at its peak, the event drew nearly 4,000 students and became a key source of revenue for the athletic department during World War II. Band Day continued until 1971, when it was canceled due to waning interest and increasing costs as the event was forced to move away from Memorial Stadium.

The band wore gray, military-issue uniforms until 1936, when they were replaced by scarlet and cream outfits to better reflect the band's position as a "purveyor of pep." Nebraska played its first bowl game in 1941 during a nationwide boycott of the American Society of Composers, Authors and Publishers. ASCAP prohibited any song it licensed from being played publicly, so members of the Cornhusker Marching Band composed "Band Song" while on the train to Pasadena. The music was based on "Song of the Vagabonds" from The Vagabond King and the lyrics were written as a reference the band's upcoming performance in the Rose Parade. Despite the ban, the band also played "Dear Old Nebraska U" without incident.

Women were temporarily allowed to join the band in 1942, when the outbreak of World War II led to a shortage of able-bodied male students and the end of a short-lived freshman band, but were again barred when the war ended. "If we hadn't had girls, we wouldn't have had a band [during the war]," explained director Don Lentz, who added that "[girls in the band] just doesn't work. Their movements are different from a man's, and this may upset the cadence." Aside from the brief inclusion of sixteen "Huskerettes" and one "featured twirler" or "Sunshine Girl," women were essentially banned until the 1972 passage of Title IX, which led to the establishment of women's varsity athletic teams across the country. For years after integration the band featured far more men than women, but today their numbers are typically comparable.

The band embarked on a European tour in 1974 after a lengthy fundraising campaign, marching nine shows in the streets of Belgium, Germany, Switzerland, and the Netherlands. The tour came as director Robert Fought sought to significantly expand the band despite athletic director Bob Devaney's insistence the school did not have money or room at Memorial Stadium to accommodate a larger ensemble.

In 1993, the Cornhusker Marching Band played at the John F. Kennedy Center for the Performing Arts as part of the Kennedy Center Honors ceremony. Event organizers surprised honoree Johnny Carson, a university alumnus, by having the band play "Hail Varsity" down the aisles. Carson died in 2005 and the band dedicated a halftime performance in his honor.

The Cornhusker Marching Band has played at every major college football bowl game, and traveled to Ireland for the 2022 Aer Lingus College Football Classic, its second visit to Dublin.

=== Band directors ===
No.	Director	Tenure
1	Samuel Hohman	1879–1880
2	Percival Everett	1880–1881
3	George Hitchcock	1881–1883
4	Adolph Weber	1883
5	David Easterday	1883–1898
6	Earle Wehn	1898–1901
7	Mortimer Wilson	1901–1903
8	August Hagenow	1903–1911
9	Claire Cornell	1911–1917
10	Billy Quick	1917–1937
11	Don Lentz	1937–1960
12	Jack Snider	1960–1973
13	Robert Fought	1973–1983
14	Bill Ballenger	1983–1986
15	Jay Kloecker	1986–1994
16	Rod Chestnutt	1994–1998
17	Craig Cornish	1998–2001
18	Anthony Falcone	2001–present

== Awards ==
The Cornhusker Marching Band performs at Memorial Stadium on Sep. 13, 2008

Following a 1927 concert in Lincoln, composer John Philip Sousa presented the Cornhusker Marching Band with a silver cup in recognition of its performance the year prior. Nearly eighty years later, Sousa's memorial foundation awarded Nebraska the Sudler Trophy, recognizing it as a band that has "demonstrated the highest musical standards and innovative marching routines and ideas, and made important contributions to the advancement of the performance standards of college marching bands." Nebraska was the fifteenth school to be awarded the trophy, which was given to a new band each year.

Nebraska was awarded the "Best-Dressed Band Award" by the Uniform Manufacturers and Designers Association in 1983.

== In popular culture ==
The Cornhusker Marching Band featured prominently in the 2005 NBC reality television miniseries Tommy Lee Goes to College, in which Mötley Crüe drummer Tommy Lee attends the university. Lee is seen conducting the band during halftime of NU's 2004 game against Baylor.

The band was featured in a 2007 episode of Extreme Makeover: Home Edition.

The 2008 romantic comedy Yes Man features multiple in-game shots of the band.
