= Forward Rebels =

Fight song at the University of Mississippi

"Forward Rebels", also known as "Rebel March", is the fight song for the University of Mississippi. It is played by the Ole Miss "The Pride of the South" marching band at official university sporting events.
