= Here Come the Hawks =

"Here Come the Hawks!" is the official fight song and introduction of the Chicago Blackhawks. The song was written by J. Swayzee and produced by the Dick Marx Orchestra and Choir in 1968. It is still played today during the pre-game video. An abbreviated rendition is also played following the end of each period on an organ. The line "There's a shot and a goal" refers to the signature scoring call by long-time Blackhawks radio play-by-play man Lloyd Pettit.

During games in November 2008, a video of current players singing the song (rather poorly in most cases) was shown during the second intermission.
