= Fly, Eagles Fly =

Fight song of the Philadelphia Eagles

"The Eagles' Victory Song"

Song
- Written: 1955
- Genre: Fight song
- Songwriters: Charles Borrelli and Roger Courtland

"The Eagles' Victory Song", popularly known as "Fly, Eagles Fly", is the fight song of the Philadelphia Eagles of the National Football League. The song is played following each Eagles touchdown during Eagles' home games at Lincoln Financial Field and as part of pre-game festivities before the playing of the national anthem.

== History ==
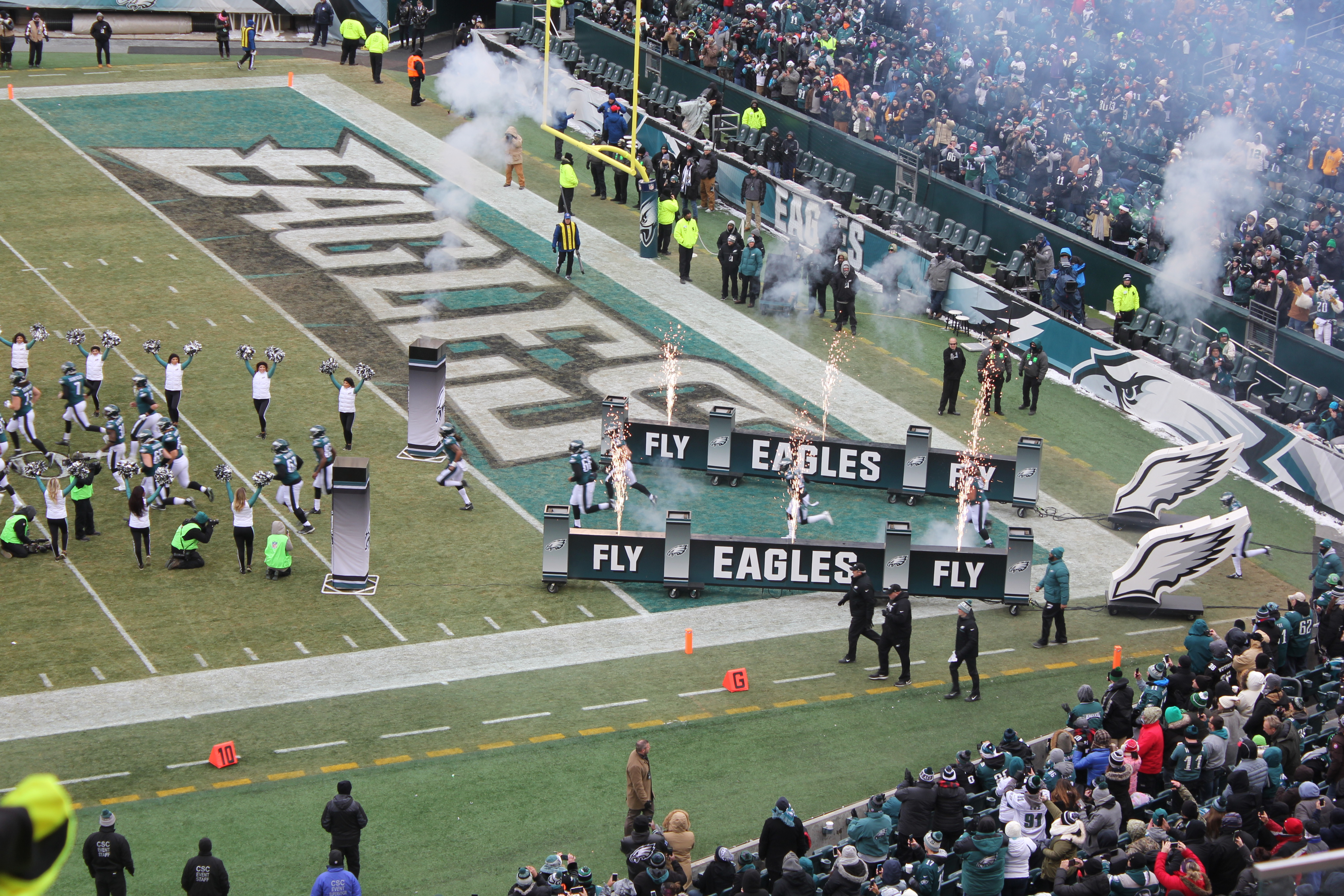
Eagles players entering the field through a tunnel reading "Fly Eagles Fly", December 2017

=== 20th century ===
"The Eagles' Victory Song" was the creation of Charles Borrelli and Roger Courtland, a Washington, D.C. music teacher and arranger for jazz guitarist Charlie Byrd. The song was mistakenly credited to "R. Courtland" by the Copyright office and in various editions of Eagles programs from the late 1950s through the 1960s.

In 1963, Jerry Wolman purchased the Philadelphia Eagles. Wolman was a sports fan growing up and loved hearing the Washington Redskins' fight song "Hail to the Redskins" at games. Spawning from his admiration for the Redskins' song, Wolman searched for musicians to implement a team song for the Eagles, and founded The Philadelphia Eagles' Sound of Brass band in 1964. The group included 200 musicians and dancers, and was led by Arlen Saylor, of Boyertown, Pennsylvania, who was appointed as the Eagles' entertainment director in 1966 and is credited with penning an arrangement of the fight song that the band played at home games during halftime in the 1960s. Wolman's push to popularize the fight song flew under the radar, however, and in 1969 the Sound of Brass band was discontinued.

During the 1970s, a band called The Eagleaires played the Eagles Fight Song from the dugout at Veterans Stadium.

The song came back into light in 1997, when Bobby Mansure, founder of an unofficial Eagles pep band, asked team management to allow the band to play in the parking lot during home games. Management gave Mansure's pep band an audition, allowing them to play at two preseason games to gauge fan reaction. The song went over so well that Mansure and the band retained a permanent position as the official Philadelphia Eagles Pep Band.

In 1998, following Mansure's reintroduction of the song, Eagles management attempted to rebuild its popularity among fans by changing some aspects of the song: they modified the key, changed the opening lyric from "Fight, Eagles Fight" to "Fly, Eagles Fly", and re-marketed the song with that as the title. In addition, they appended the popular "E-A-G-L-E-S" chant—which had emerged in the 1980s—to the end of the song. While management planned to play the song throughout the 1998 season, the Eagles' poor performance that year caused them to hold off reintroducing the song until the following year. The Eagles fared better during their 1999 season, and subsequently, the fight song was played after every score.

=== 21st century ===
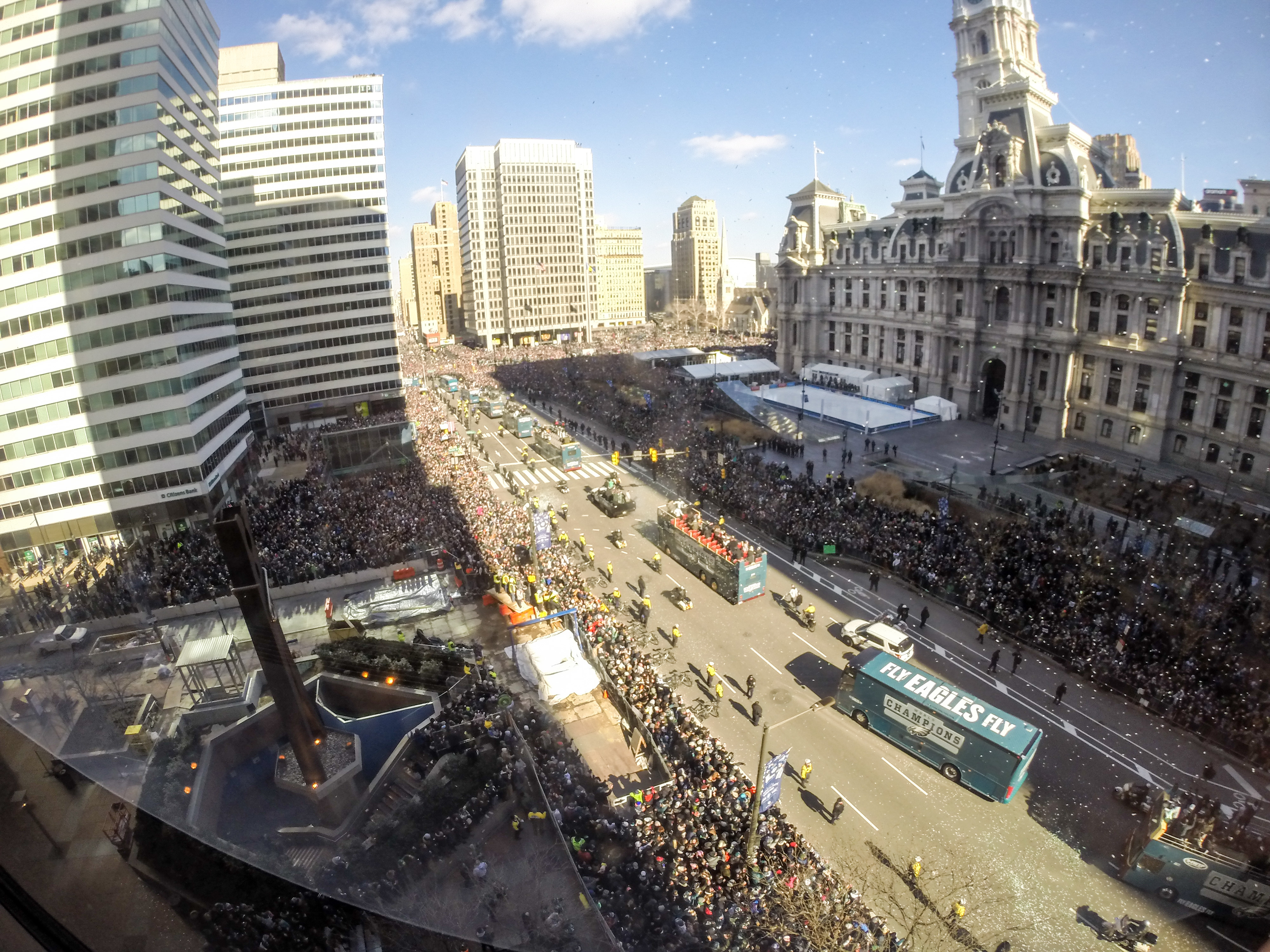
The Eagles' Super Bowl LII victory parade, featuring a bus with the message "Fly Eagles Fly," seen in front of City Hall

The song is sung/chanted at Eagles' home games, and Billboard has recognized it as one of the best NFL fight songs of all time. A modern arrangement by the current Eagles Pep Band is featured on the official Eagles website.

In 2022, Coldplay performed the song during a concert at Lincoln Financial Field.

In February 2025, prior to the Eagles' Super Bowl LIX appearance and victory, Aloysius Butler & Clark, a Delaware based marketing company, created a prank phone number that was advertised to pump-up fans of the Super Bowl rival Kansas City Chiefs. However, when the number was dialed, the song would play. The phone number was advertised on a billboard along I-435 outside of Arrowhead Stadium.

On March 26, 2025, the Eagles fired the Pep Band citing that the in game entertainment has evolved, preferring the use of a DJ over the band.

During the 2026 FIFA World Cup, Brazil fans sung the song during and after their game against Haiti.
