= Fight for Santa Clara =

Fight song of Santa Clara University

"Fight For Santa Clara" is the fight song of the Santa Clara University. It was composed by Winnie Cutter, a graduate of the class of 1905. in 1898 following the last-minute football victory over the University of Chicago that clinched a league championship.

== Full Lyrics ==
All hail to S.C.U.
Honor her prestige and fame,
Oh! hold high those standards
As we go into the game.

(Chorus)

Varsity fight for Santa Clara
Banners of red and white on high
No matter how great your foe men [team],
Let your motto be "to do or die."
Rah! Rah! Varsity men [team],
We are cheering for you,
Our gallant heroes, sturdy, staunch and true
Remember the right and might of Red and White
When Santa Clara warriors fight,
For Victory, and our dear old S.C.U.

Then U. fight! fight! for the Alma Mater we love,
oh fight! fight! and strength shall come from above,
We now acclaim your fame,
Rah! Rah! Rah!

Come join our happy throng,
Oh make the welkin resound,
Help build to tradition,
That S.C.U. men [team] ne'er give ground.

(Repeat Chorus)

While Hamilton stands guard,
Over thy rich, fertile vale,
Belov'd Alma Mater,
Teach no word akin to fail.

(Repeat Chorus)
