= Meet the Mets =

1963 single by Steve Goodman

Single by Glenn Osser and Orchestra
- Released: March 9, 1963
- Recorded: 1961–1962
- Genre: Rock
- Length: 1:55
- Label: Michael Brent Publications, Inc.
- Songwriters: Ruth Roberts and Bill Katz

"Meet the Mets" is the fight song of the New York Mets of Major League Baseball. The music and lyrics were written in 1961 by Ruth Roberts and Bill Katz, and it was originally recorded by Glenn Osser's orchestra. The song's lyrics "East Side, West Side" are a tribute to The Sidewalks of New York, a popular New York song of the 1890s. Rewritten and modernized versions were recorded in 1975 and 1984.

It was chosen by Mets' President George Weiss, director of promotions Julie Adler, and representatives of the J. Walter Thompson advertising agency in a contest for an official song that was run by the Mets, and beat 18 other entries. Although the Mets' inaugural season and the return of National League baseball to New York City was in 1962, the master recording was not made until March 1, 1963. The team sold 45 rpm records of the song for $1.00 at the Polo Grounds, their home stadium in 1963, and via mail order.

"Meet the Mets" was also featured in a "This is SportsCenter" commercial starring Mr. Met as well as on Seinfeld ("The Millennium") and Everybody Loves Raymond ("Big Shots"). Rock band Yo La Tengo recorded a version of "Meet the Mets" live on New Jersey radio station WFMU that was included on the 2006 compilation album Yo La Tengo Is Murdering the Classics.

The instrumental of the original version opened and closed broadcasts of Met games on WFAN radio and is used for lineup rundowns during home games on SportsNet New York, while part of the 1984 update opened and closed WFAN's Mets Extra pre- and post-game shows. For the 2009 season, with the closing of Shea Stadium and opening of Citi Field, the 1984 version was edited by WFAN to cut to the instrumental portion just before the singer sings "Hot dogs, green grass all out at Shea / Guaranteed to have a heck of a day." According to The New York Times, the song's original lyrics — "Bring your kiddies, bring your wife / Guaranteed to have the time of your life" — were viewed as "arguably sexist."

In 2008, an updated version the song was recorded with a rap/hip-hop sound, purportedly to appeal to a younger generation. In the second half of the 2009 season, the Mets' first at Citi Field, the original version was often played in the ballpark during breaks in the late innings as a crowd sing-along.

As of the 2024 season, the original instrumental version is used to open and close the Mets radio broadcasts produced by Audacy.

Sportswriter Leonard Koppett affected the role of classical music critic in 1963 to tweak the song's simplistic composition: "There is little in the score of interest to a mid-20th-century audience. The harmony is traditional; no influences of atonality or polytonality can be found. In fact, it's sort of un-tonal.”

"Meet the Mets" was not the first enduring sports-related song for Roberts and Katz, who were professional songwriters. The duo had earlier written "Mr. Touchdown, U.S.A." in 1950, "I Love Mickey," a tribute to New York Yankees centerfielder Mickey Mantle recorded in 1956 by Teresa Brewer, and "It's a Beautiful Day for a Ballgame" in 1960, well known to fans who heard it played regularly at Dodger Stadium home games.

== See also… ==
- "Let's Go Mets Go" – the rally song of the 1986 Mets
