= Hey! Hey! Tampa Bay! =

Fight song of the Tampa Bay Buccaneers

Song
- Written: 1979
- Genre: Fight song
- Songwriter: Jeff Arthur

“Hey! Hey! Tampa Bay!” is the official fight song of the Tampa Bay Buccaneers of the NFL. The song was written by Jeff Arthur, and debuted in 1979, which was the year the Buccaneers recorded their first playoff berth.

== History ==
Jeff Arthur, a 28-year old musician who studied at the nearby University of South Florida, created the song in fall 1979. The recording was funded by his father, the owner of a local yacht and tennis club, and recorded in an Orlando studio.

Arthur presented the song to Bob Best, the team's public relations director, who liked it and approved it to debut with the team in the 1980 season. However, the song was played early during a game in the 1979 season against the Kansas City Chiefs, when the Buccaneers were not playing well. Tampa Bay would come back to win the game, clinching their first ever playoff berth. Afterwards, over 20,000 sound sheets for the song were distributed in the Tampa Bay area, and the song was chanted during the team's win against the Philadelphia Eagles in the first round of the playoffs. Over 70,000 sheets were distributed before the Buccaneers matchup against the Los Angeles Rams in the 1979 NFC Championship Game.

Arthur would later release a follow up song, part disco and part slow, entitled "Just Like You" in July 1980.

The Buccaneers' 2026 throwback uniform included stitched lettering of "Hey! Hey! Tampa Bay!" on the jersey collar.

== Reception ==
Wide receiver Theo Bell said that he was excited to hear the song after being signed by the Bucs in 1981, after hearing the fight song when playing as a visitor with the Pittsburgh Steelers.
