= On, On, U of K =

Fight song at the University of Kentucky

Song
- Published: 1925
- Genre: Fight song
- Composer(s): Carl A. Lampert
- Lyricist(s): Troy Perkins

On, On, U of K, also punctuated as "On! On! U of K", is a fight song at the University of Kentucky. Although it is primarily associated with the historically successful Kentucky Wildcats men's basketball program, the lyrics are actually specific to football. Aside from this song, the school is rarely referred to as "U of K" but simply as "UK."

The melody was written in 1922 by Dr. Carl Lampert, a music professor and the first UK music department chair, while the lyrics were written the following year by Troy Perkins, a student. The song was first published in The 1925 Kentuckian, the University of Kentucky yearbook.

== Composition ==
The song is in F major.

== Lyrics ==
“On, on U of K. We are right for the fight today!
Hold that ball and hit that line. Every Wildcat star will shine.
We’ll fight, fight, fight for the Blue and White, as we roll to that goal, varsity.
And we’ll kick, pass and run ‘til the battle is won, and we’ll bring home the victory”
