= Hail to Old OSU =

Song

Harold A. Wilkins, OAC Class of 1907, author of "Hail to Old OAC".

"Hail to Old OSU" is the fight song of Oregon State University. It is derived from a song published by Harold A. Wilkins in 1914 and is played mainly at sporting events like football and basketball games.

The lyrics have been slightly altered since being written "to conform to a changing culture", as well as adopting new initials for the school — with Oregon Agricultural College (OAC) becoming Oregon State Agricultural College (OSAC) in 1927, Oregon State College (OSC) in 1937, and finally emerging as today's OSU in 1961.

The song was written during the 1909-10 academic year and its music and lyrics were published and copyrighted in 1914. The tune is now in the public domain.

== History ==
=== Background ===
The OSU fight song is the chorus of a song penned by Harold A. Wilkins, "Hail to Old OAC: A Rooter's Song." Wilkins was himself a member of the Oregon Agricultural College's graduating class of 1907. The song was not written during Wilkins' OAC days, however, but was rather written during the 1909-10 academic year, when he was attending law school at the University of Michigan.

Wilkins, a "one-armed trumpeter" and glee club singer, sent a copy of the tune to a musically-minded college chum, who in turn introduced it to other students. The song's popularity grew organically, and it was shortly voted the school song by OAC's student body.

"Hail to Old OAC" gained increased popularity when sung by football crowds during the 1913 football season. The tune was so well received that the songwriter took note, and in the spring of 1914 Wilkins officially published the song in San Francisco.

The first edition of the published score included a title page printed in the school's colors, orange and black, with two photographic views of the campus. Wilkins' friend Ralph Bower added drawings of the four major sports at the school — football, basketball, baseball, and track and field — around the border of the page. Copies of the sheet music were sold at several locations around Corvallis.

"Harold Wilkins is the first to publish a song about OAC and his is likely to make a hit that will 'immortalize' him," the local newspaper, the Corvallis Gazette-Times opined. "The music has a good swing to it and the words are inspiring."

After practicing law in Portland for ten years, Wilkins later moved to Los Angeles, where he established a lucrative business manufacturing the specialized brushes used by street sweepers. He did carefully preserve the original manuscript of the OAC fight song, however, which was presented to Oregon State's Horner Museum and put on public display in April 1941.

Wilkins died of a heart attack on February 17, 1960.

=== Original lyrics ===
First page of the score of Hail to Old OAC, from which the current Oregon State University fight song is extracted.

The original song contains two verses and a chorus. The original lyrics are as follows:

(1)

Here we come with a toast and a song for the college up on the hill,

We love its shady slopes and trees, its members cheer and thrill;

But fondest thought when the years have run

Will be our teams and the vict'ries won,

Each man a loyal son,

Hail to old OAC

(chorus)

OAC, our hats are off to you,

Beavers, Beavers, fighters thru and thru,

We'll cheer for ev'ry man,

We'll root for ev'ry stand

That's made for old OAC

[men—] Rah, Rah, Rah!

Watch our team go tearing down the field,

Men of iron, their strength will never yield.

Hail! Hail! Hail! Hail!

Hail to old OAC—

(2)

We'll root hard for the baseball star who can knock out a long home run,

And cheer the man who kicks the goal that means the game is won;

But mem'ries best in our Hall of Fame,

Are for the man who's always game,

Win, lose, fights just the same,

All for old OAC

=== Today's fight song ===
As is the case with the fight song of the University of Oregon, "Mighty Oregon," the verses of "Hail to Old OSU" have atrophied into disuse through what Scott Barkhurst of the Oregon School of Music has called "the reductionism of popularity."

"No one wants to learn [multiple] verses to a fight song. No one wants to learn [multiple] verses of anything," he told the Oregon Daily Emerald in 2006. "There’s three verses to 'The Star-Spangled Banner.' How many people know the other verses to that?"

Oregon State's Fight Song is a modified version of the chorus from "Hail to Old OAC," followed by a chant ("O-S-U Fight! B-E-A-V-E-R-S!") backed by drums, and a repeat of the second half of the chorus. No verse is sung.

The Oregon State University Alumni Association, at the time owners of all rights to the song, modified the words of the Fight Song in the 1980s to be gender neutral.The song has subsequently passed into the public domain.

The most commonly accepted lyrics today are:

OSU, our hats are off to you

Beavers, Beavers, fighters through and through

We'll cheer throughout the land,

We'll root for every stand

That's made for old OSU.

Watch our team go tearing down the field

Those of iron, their strength will never yield.

Hail, hail, hail, hail

Hail to old OSU.
