= Co-Ed Fight Song =

Fight song of the University of Hawaii

Co-Ed Fight Song is the official fight song of the University of Hawaii.

The melody to the "Co-Ed Fight Song" comes from a march entitled "Co-Ed" by J.S. Zamecnik, originally published in 1914 with the cover declaration: "Respectfully Dedicated to the College Girls." The original lyrics, by J.R. Shannon, began: "Here's to the girl in college / And to her charming ways; / Here's to the girl of knowledge, / Pride of our student days."

No one can recall when the lyrics to the Hawaii version of the song were composed, but they may very well date back before 1972.

The last line of the "Co-Ed Fight Song" was revised in 2007 to make the song fitting for both men and women athletes. The lyrics were changed from "Here‘s to each valiant son" to "Here‘s to each valiant one."

== Lyrics ==
Co-Ed Fight Song

Here's to our dear Hawai'i.
Here's to our Green and White.
Here's to our Alma Mater.
Here's to the team with fight.
Rah! Rah! Rah!
Here's to old warriors calling.
Here's to old battles won.
Here's to Hawai'i's victory.
Here's to each valiant one.
