= Ruth Roberts =

American songwriter (August 31, 1926 – June 30, 2011)

Roberts

Ruth Olive Roberts (August 31, 1926 – June 30, 2011) was an American composer, organist and pianist who wrote the music for the New York Mets theme song and other popular hits.

== Life and career ==
Roberts was born in Port Chester, New York, to Robert and Lillian Mulwitz. She was educated at Port Chester High School, Northwestern University, the Juilliard School, and in Europe. Her teachers included Heinrich Gebhard, Dr. John Hermann Loud, Tobias Matthay, and Dr. Irving J. Morgan.

Roberts had a long professional collaboration with lyricist Bill Katz. Their most notable collaboration was the 1961 fight song "Meet the Mets", the official theme song of the New York Mets of Major League Baseball. Some of Roberts' other songs included "The First Thing Ev'ry Morning (And the Last Thing Ev'ry Night)" (co-written with and recorded by Jimmy Dean) and "Mailman, Bring Me No More Blues". The latter song was first recorded by Buddy Holly on his 1958 self-titled album. It was later recorded by The Beatles in 1969 for their album Let It Be, but their version was not released until 1996.

Roberts was married to Gene Piller, a Hollywood screenwriter. She was the mother of Michael Piller, screenwriter/producer best known for three Star Trek series and Dead Zone. She died in Rye Brook, New York.
