= Princeton Cannon Song =

Princeton University fight song

The "Princeton Cannon Song" is a fight song that was written by Joseph Frederick Hewitt and Arthur Herbert Osborn, both members of the Princeton University Class of 1907. Hewitt and Osborn dedicated the song to their class.

== Lyrics ==
In Princeton town we've got a team

That knows the way to play.

With Princeton spirit back of them

They're sure to win the day.

With cheers and song we'll rally 'round

The Cannon as of yore,

And Nassau's walls will echo with

The Princeton Tiger's roar:

[Chorus]

(And then we'll) Crash through the line of blue

And send the backs on 'round the end!

Fight, fight for ev'ry yard,

Princeton's honor to defend.

Rah! Rah! Rah! Rah!

Tiger sis boom ah!

And locomotives by the score!

For we'll fight with a vim

That is dead sure to win

For Old Nassau!
