= It's for You, North Dakota U =

Fight song of American university

"It's For You, North Dakota U" (or North Dakota U) is a fight song of the University of North Dakota in Grand Forks, North Dakota. The song was composed by Franz Rickaby in 1921.

== Lyrics ==
It's for you North Dakota U
That we sing, your sons and daughters true;
Cheering our comrades to Victory
Renewing allegiance to UND

Your honor we uphold in every contest,
As your children aye shall do;
And whenever you hear the cry of Odz! Odz! Dzi!
It's for you, North Dakota U. It's for U.
