= The Great Music Themes of Television =

Studio album by Hugo Winterhalter
- Released: 1954
- Studio: RCA Victor Records
- Genre: Easy listening, Instrumental
- Label: RCA Victor Records
- Producer: Hugo Winterhalter

The Great Music Themes of Television is an LP of music used as television program theme songs, arranged and conducted by Hugo Winterhalter.

== Origin and concept ==
Hugo Winterhalter, named the chief musical director of RCA Victor Records in January 1950, was also under contract to record under his own name. Over a three-year period he recorded six 10-inch LPs. Released in the fall of 1954, The Great Music Themes of Television was Winterhalter's seventh record for the label, and was one of RCA Victor's earliest 12-inch LPs. It is among the first collections of theme songs from television programs. The album liner notes observe that television programs:

are one way in which good and entertaining music has been made available in such a way as to become familiar but not overly-familiar, recurrent but not hackneyed. The art of theme music is an important one for, regardless of whether the music is especially written for the show or not, it must make a brave appearance, it must be of such proportions that it will be indelibly associated with what it represents. It must belong to its particular program, it must become part of the special atmosphere which weekly projects itself into millions of American homes.

== Reception ==
Cash Box magazine characterized the album as a "beautiful variety of wonderful music," noting that it includes themes that "have become so indelibly associated with the shows, that many forget the real name of the melody and remember it only by the program's name." Another reviewer concluded that the album "is wonderfully enjoyable, even though several of the themes are little more than musical strains."

== Alternate releases ==
RCA released The Great Themes of Television in a two-disk 45 EP album featuring eight of the twelve tracks on the LP version, two tracks on each of the four sides. (Note: Omitted were "Orchid Room," "On The Trail," "Salute to Industry," and "The Dream of Olwen".)

1956 Rerelease

Two years after its initial release, RCA reissued The Great Themes of Television with a new cover and liner notes. The 1954 album cover was graced simply with a portrait photograph of Hugo Winterhalter. The 1956 album carries a narrative photograph of two showgirls posing in front of a television camera, a backstage depiction of a mid-century television variety show, which typically featured a dance routine. The liner notes claim that the songs "are not simply a tuneful and richly presented tapestry of sound," but also are "familiar and evocative themes, come to visit again but this time for a longer and more enjoyable stay."

== Track listing ==
Track	Title	TV Show	Composers
1	"The Coca-Cola Company Theme"	"Eddie Fisher Show"	Leonard Joy
2	"Melancholy Serenade"	"The Jackie Gleason Show"	Jackie Gleason
3	"Orchid Room"	"Robert Montgomery Presents"	Robert Busby
4	"Seems Like Old Times”	"Arthur Godfrey Show"	Carmen Lombardo, John Jacob Loeb
5	"On The Trail"	"I Love Lucy"	Ferde Grofé
6	"If I Could Tell You – In My Garden"	"The Voice of Firestone"	Idabelle Firestone
7	"Smoke Dreams"	"The Chesterfield Supper Club"	Lloyd Shaffer, John Klenner, Louis Ted Steele
8	"Music of Manhattan – Memories of Yesterday"	"Kraft Theatre"	Norman Clautier
9	"Mama"	"Mama"	Joseph Darion, Billy Nalle, Louis C. Singer
10	"Salute to Industry"	"Philco Playhouse"	Morris Mamorsky
11	"Prelude to the Stars"	"Studio 1"	Vic Oliver
12	"The Dream of Olwen"	"Hall of Fame"	Charles Williams
