= Hugo Winterhalter =

American musician, arranger and composer (1909–1973)

Background information
- Born: Hugo Ferdinand Winterhalter; August 15, 1909; Wilkes-Barre, PA
- Died: September 17, 1973 (aged 64)
- Education: New England Conservatory of Music
- Occupations: Composer; arranger; conductor
- Instruments: violin, reed instruments
- Years active: 1935-1969
- Labels: RCA Victor, Kapp, Musicor
- Spouse: Mary Margaret Hardey

Hugo Winterhalter (August 15, 1909 – September 17, 1973) was an American easy listening arranger and composer, best known for his many arrangements and recordings for RCA Victor.

== Biography ==
Hugo Ferdinand Winterhalter was born in Wilkes-Barre, Pennsylvania, United States, on August 15, 1909, to Hugo Winterhalter and Mary Gallagher, both second generation German-Americans. He graduated from Mount St. Mary's in Emmitsburg, Maryland, in 1931, where he played saxophone for the orchestra and sang in two of the choirs. He later studied violin and reed instruments at the New England Conservatory of Music. After graduating, he taught school for several years before turning professional during the mid-1930s, serving as a sideman and arranger for Count Basie, Tommy Dorsey, Raymond Scott, Claude Thornhill and others.

Winterhalter also arranged and conducted sessions for singers including Dinah Shore and Billy Eckstine, and in 1948 he was named musical director at MGM Records. After two years with the label, he joined Columbia Records, where he scored a pair of hits with his recordings of "Jealous Heart" and "Blue Christmas".

In 1950, Winterhalter moved to RCA Victor, where he arranged sessions for most of the label's pop recording artists of the era including Perry Como, Harry Belafonte, Eddie Fisher, Jaye P. Morgan, Eartha Kitt, and the Ames Brothers. He also recorded several instrumental albums, among them 1954's The Great Music Themes of Television, believed to be the first collection of TV theme songs ever recorded. Winterhalter also notched a series of chart hits, including "Mr. Touchdown, U.S.A.", "A Kiss to Build a Dream On", "Blue Tango", "Vanessa", "The Little Shoemaker", and "Song of The Barefoot Contessa". With pianist Eddie Heywood, he had a minor hit with "Land of Dreams" in 1954 and reached the number one spot on Billboard with "Canadian Sunset" in 1956. The record sold over one million copies, and was awarded a gold disc by the RIAA.

Winterhalter penned the main title theme for the film, Diamond Head (1962). His other motion picture credits include work as conductor and arranger for Eddie Fisher and Debbie Reynolds in the 1956 musical comedy, Bundle of Joy, and orchestrator for Thrill of a Romance (1945) and Meet the People (1944).

Winterhalter remained with RCA Victor until 1963, at which time he moved to Kapp. Winterhalter recorded a handful of albums for Kapp including The Best of '64 and its follow-up, The Big Hits of 1965, before leaving the label to work on Broadway. He later worked in television and continued recording the occasional LP for various budget labels. Winterhalter's last US chart single was "Theme From 'Popi'", released by Musicor in 1969. It reached #35 in the Billboard Easy Listening Top 40.

Winterhalter died from cancer, in Greenwich, Connecticut on September 17, 1973. He is interred alongside his wife at Rockland Cemetery in Sparkill, New York. Winterhalter had a son, Hugo Francis Winterhalter, who was killed in Vietnam on December 29, 1966. He was with the 169th Combat Engineer Battalion.

== Musical style ==
The back cover of "Hugo Winterhalter Goes...Continental" shares this about the conductor:

Maestro Winterhalter uses a very large string section, a full brass section (he was, incidentally, one of the first of the big-band leaders to use such previously symphonic instruments as the French horn in popular music), a large woodwind choir, and timpani galore. Together with the distinctive Winterhalter arranging touch, this all results in a fresh and ear-filling treatment of even those tunes that are standard fare wherever pop music is played.
