= Fight On Sioux =

"Fight On Sioux" is a fight song of the University of North Dakota in Grand Forks, North Dakota. Since the retiring of the Fighting Sioux nickname in 2012, it has been renamed to "U-N-D". Along with the new name, any references to Native American culture have been removed. For example, in the old version, one line stated "And as we go we'll show each foe that we're the toughest tribe between the poles". In the new version of the song, the word "tribe" has been replaced with the word "team".

== Lyrics ==
Fight on Sioux, we're all for you
We're thousands of strong and loyal souls
We know you'll win every game you're in
No matter how distant the goals

As we go, we'll show each foe that
We're the toughest tribe between the poles
We're rough and tough it's true
But we're sportsmen through and through
We're the Fighting Sioux from North Dakota U
