= I'm a Jayhawk =

Song

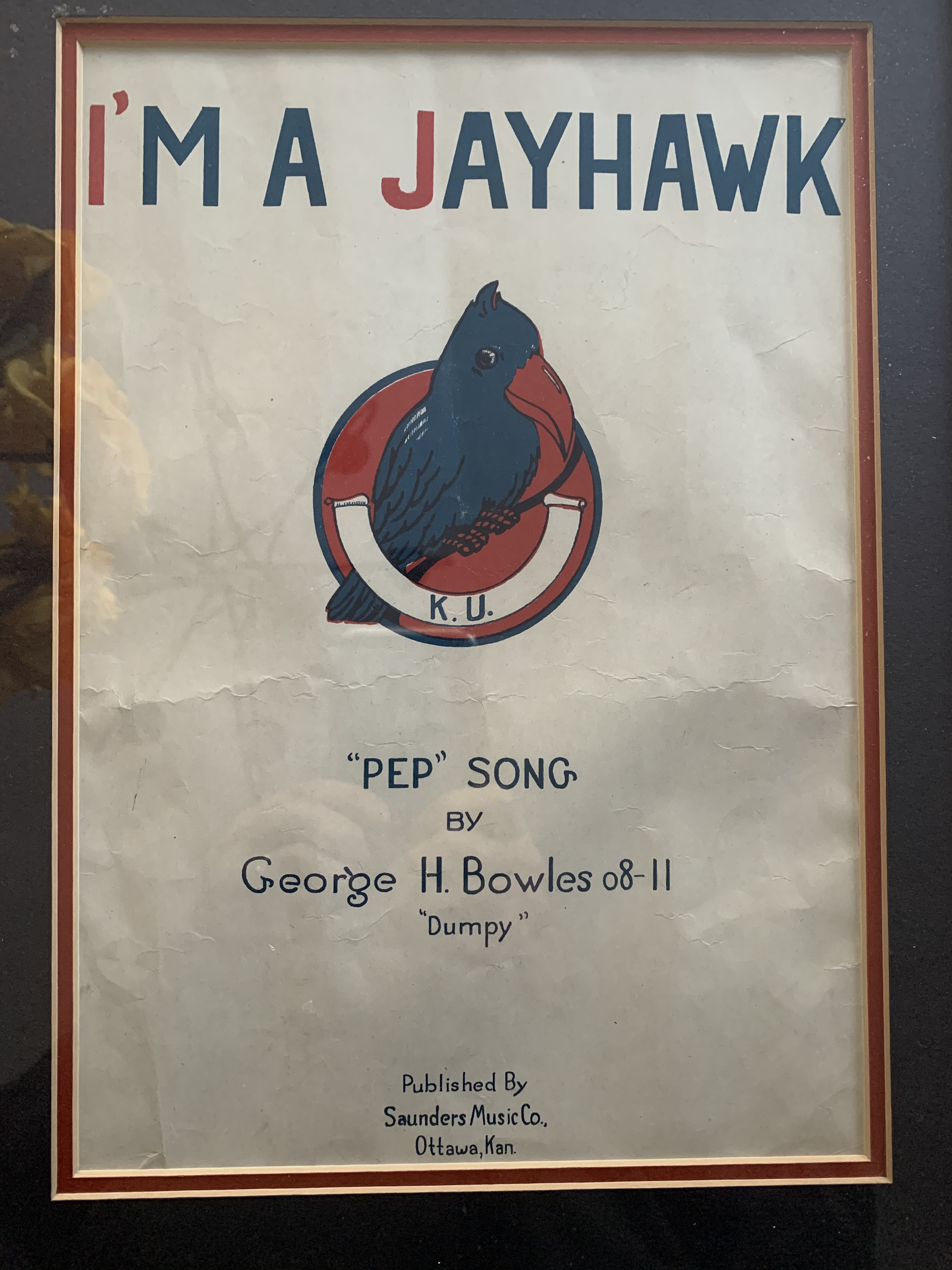
Original 'I'M A JAYHAWK sheet music cover

I'm a Jayhawk is the fight song of the University of Kansas.

== History ==
The original lyrics and music were written by George "Dumpy" Bowles in 1911. The lyrics to the song are generally not sung, instead, fans do a specific clap as the KU band plays the melody. The university bands do not play the intro, but only play the chorus of the song.

The song was updated in 1958 to reflect the teams of the Big 8 Conference. The lyrics were rewritten again in 2010 to account for the departure of Nebraska and Colorado from the Big 12 Conference. The school has elected to not rewrite the lyrics following the departure of Texas A&M and Missouri from the league.

== Lyrics ==
Bowles' original wording of the song is as follows.

Talk about the Sooners, the Cowboys and the Buffs,
Talk about the Tiger and his tail,
Talk about the Wildcat, and those Cornhuskin’ boys,
But I’m the bird to make’em weep and wail,
‘Cause I’m a Jay, Jay, Jay, Jayhawk
Up at Lawrence on the Kaw
‘Cause I’m a Jay, Jay, Jay, Jayhawk
With a sis-boom hip hoorah.

‘Cause I’m a Jay, Jay, Jay, Jayhawk
Up at Lawrence on the Kaw
‘Cause I’m a Jay, Jay, Jay, Jayhawk
With a sis-boom hip hoorah,
Got a bill that’s big enough to twist the Tiger’s tail,
Husk some corn and listen to the Cornhusker’s wail,
‘Cause I’m a Jay, Jay, Jay, Jayhawk
Riding on a Kansas Gale!
