= Fight song =

Song associated with a sports team

A fight song is a rousing short song associated with a sports team. The term is most common in the United States and Canada. In Australia, Mexico, and New Zealand, these songs are called the team anthem, team song, or games song. First associated with collegiate sports, fight songs are also used by secondary schools and in professional sports.

Fight songs are sing-alongs, allowing sports fans to cheer collectively for their team. These songs are commonly played several times at a sporting event. For example, the band might play the fight song when entering the stadium, whenever their team scores, or while cheerleaders dance at halftime or during other breaks in the game. In Australian rules football, the team song is traditionally sung by the winning team at the end of the game.

Some fight songs have a long history, connecting the fans who sing them to a time-honored tradition, frequently to music played by the institution's band. An analysis of 65 college fight songs by FiveThirtyEight identified words commonly used in the lyrics of these songs, including fight, win, and victory. Other common elements of fight song lyrics are mentioning the team's colors, spelling out the school's name, and using the words "hail" and "rah." Many songs were composed by students, alumni, or faculty of the institution; for example, Cole Porter wrote "Bulldog" for his alma mater Yale College. Some songs are created by pairing new lyrics with a pre-existing tune, even another college's fight song.

Hundreds of colleges have fight songs, most originating from the early 20th century in connection with football. The first collegiate fight song in the United States is Boston College's "For Boston", written and composed by T. J. Hurley in 1885. One of the oldest fight songs in Australia is Melbourne Grammar School's "Play Together, Dark Blue Twenty" dating to before 1893. In 1997, USA Today selected "Aggie War Hymn", the fight song of Texas A&M University, as the "No. 1" college football fight song in the United States.

Although used similarly, stadium anthems differ from fight songs because they are not written specifically for a sports team. Fight songs are also different from an alma mater or school song, which is a patronal song for an educational institution and usually has a slower tempo.

== List of college fight songs ==
Many colleges have unofficial fight songs or have changed their official song over the years. Additionally, some colleges have rally songs, spirit songs, cheer songs, and alma maters. This list is exclusively for the fight song or songs currently approved by the institution, even if played infrequently.

=== Canada ===
University Name	Team Name	Fight Song	Reference
University of Alberta	Alberta Golden Bears and Pandas	"University Cheer Song"	
University of British Columbia	UBC Thunderbirds	"Hail, U.B.C."	
Bishop's University	Bishop's Gaiters	"Raise a Toast!"	
Royal Military College of Canada	Royal Military College Paladins	"Precision"	
Queen's University	Queen's Golden Gaels	"Queen's College Colours (Oil Thigh)"	
University of Saskatchewan	Saskatchewan Huskies	"Fight! Fight! Fight!"	
University of Toronto	Toronto Varsity Blues	"The Blue and White"	
University of Western Ontario (Western University)	Western Mustangs	"The Western Song"	

=== Japan ===
University	Fight Song	Reference
Doshisha University	"Doshisha Heroes"	
Hosei University	"Wakaki Hi No Hokori"	
Keio University	"Wakaki-chi"	
Kwansei Gakuin University	"Shingetsu-ki no moto ni, Fight On Kwansei"	
Meiji University	"Shikon No Uta"	
Nihon University	"Hana-no-Seiei"	
Rikkyo University	"St.Paul's will shine tonight"	
Ritsumeikan University	"Greater Ritsumei"	
University of Tokyo	"Tada Hitotsu"	
Waseda University	"Konpeki-no-Sora"	

=== Mexico ===
University	Team Name	Fight Song	Reference
Universidad Autónoma de Guadalajara		"Himnos Tecos!"	

=== United States ===
University	Team Name	Fight Song	Ref
Abilene Christian University	Abilene Christian Wildcats	"ACU Fight Song"	
Adelphi University	Adelphi Panthers	"Alma mater"	
Adrian College	Adrian Bulldogs	"Adrian College fight song!"	
United States Air Force Academy	Air Force Falcons	"Falcon Fight Song"	
University of Akron	Akron Zips	"Akron fight song"	
University of Alabama	Alabama Crimson Tide	"Yea Alabama!"	
Alabama A&M University	Alabama A&M Bulldogs	"the Drake song"	
University of Alabama in Huntsville	Alabama-Huntsville Chargers	"We Are Chargers"	
Alabama State University	Alabama State Hornets	"Hail Alabama"	
University of Alaska Fairbanks	Alaska Nanooks	"UAF Fight Song"	
University at Albany, SUNY	Albany Great Danes	"Purple and Gold"	
Albion College	Albion Britons	"Fyte Onne!"	
Albright College	Albright Lions	"Albright Fight Song"	
Alcorn State University	Alcorn State Braves	"Alcorn ode"	
Alfred University	Alfred Saxons	"On, Saxon Warriors"	
Allegheny College	Allegheny Gators	"Alma Mater"	
Alma College	Alma Scots	"Alma College Scots Fight Song"	
American University	American Eagles	"AU Fight Song"	
Amherst College	Amherst Mammoths	"Lord Jeffery Amherst" and "Cheer for Old Amherst"	
Anderson University (Indiana)	Anderson Ravens	"Raven Fight Song"	
Angelo State University	Angelo State Rams	"ASU Fight Song"	
Appalachian State University	Appalachian State Mountaineers	"Hi Hi Yikas"	
University of Arizona	Arizona Wildcats	"Fight, Wildcats, Fight!"; "Bear Down, Arizona"	
Arizona State University	Arizona State Sun Devils	"Maroon and Gold"	
University of Arkansas	Arkansas Razorbacks	"Arkansas Fight"	
University of Arkansas–Pine Bluff	Arkansas–Pine Bluff Golden Lions	"UAPB Fight Song"	
Arkansas State University	Arkansas State Red Wolves	"ASU Loyalty Fight Song"	
Arkansas Tech University	Arkansas Tech Wonder Boys and Golden Suns	"ATU Fight Song"	
United States Military Academy	Army Black Knights	"On Brave Old Army Team"	
Ashland University	Ashland Eagles	"The Battle Song"	
Assumption College	Assumption Greyhounds	"Greyhounds Win"	
Auburn University	Auburn Tigers	"War Eagle"	
Augsburg University	Augsburg Auggies	"The Auggie Fight Song"	
Augustana College (Illinois)	Augustana Vikings	"The Augustana Fight Song"	
Augustana University	Augustana University Vikings	"The Augustana School Song"	
Austin College	Austin Fighting Roos	"Austin College Fight Song"	
Austin Peay State University	Austin Peay Governors	"Austin Peay Fight Song"	
Baldwin-Wallace University	Baldwin Wallace Yellow Jackets	"B.W. Battle Song"	
Ball State University	Ball State Cardinals	"Fight, Team, Fight"	
Barry University	Barry Buccaneers	"Go Barry Go"	
Bates College	Bates Bobcats	"School Songs"	
Baylor University	Baylor Bears	"Old Fight"	
Bellarmine University	Bellarmine Knights	"Bellarmine University Fight Song"	
Belmont University	Belmont Bruins	"Belmont University Fight Song"	
Bemidji State University	Bemidji State Beavers	"Go Bemidji Beavers"	
Benedictine College	Benedictine Ravens	"Raven Fight Song"	
Bethune-Cookman University	Bethune-Cookman Wildcats	"Let's Go Wildcats"	
Birmingham–Southern College	Birmingham–Southern Panthers	"Birmingham-Southern Fight Song"	
Black Hills State University	Black Hills State Yellow Jackets	"BHSU Fight Song"	
Boise State University	Boise State Broncos	"Boise State Fight Song"	
Boston College	Boston College Eagles	"For Boston"	
Boston University	Boston University Terriers	"Go BU"	
Bowling Green State University	Bowling Green Falcons	"Forward Falcons"	
Bradley University	Bradley Braves	"Bradley Loyalty Song"	
Brandeis University	Brandeis Judges	"Brandeis Fight Song"	
Brown University	Brown Brown	"Ever True to Brown" and "The Brown Cheering Song"	
Bucknell University	Bucknell Bison	"Ray Bucknell"	
Buena Vista University	Buena Vista Beavers	"Buena Vista Fight Song"	
University at Buffalo	Buffalo Bulls	"Buffalo Fight Song"	
Butler University	Butler Bulldogs	"Butler War Song"	
Brigham Young University	BYU Cougars	"The Cougar Song"	
Brigham Young University–Hawaii	BYU–Hawaii Seasiders	"BYU-H Fight Song"	
University of California, Berkeley	California Golden Bears	"Fight for California"	
California Lutheran University	Cal Lutheran Kingsmen and Regals	"The CLU Fight Song"	
California Polytechnic State University, San Luis Obispo	Cal Poly Mustangs	"Ride High, You Mustangs"	
Cal Poly Humboldt	Cal Poly Humboldt Lumberjacks	"Drive On Humboldt"	
California State Polytechnic University, Pomona	Cal Poly Pomona Broncos	"Bronco Fight Song"	
California State University, Bakersfield	Cal State Bakersfield Roadrunner	"CSUB Victory!"	
California State University, East Bay	Cal State East Bay Pioneers	"Pioneer Fight Song"	
California State University, Fullerton	Cal State Fullerton Titans	"Fight On, Titans"	
California Institute of Technology	Caltech Beavers	"Fight for California Tech"	
Cameron University	Cameron Aggies	"Aggie's Fight"	
Campbell University	Campbell Fighting Camels	"Campbell University Fight Song"	
Canisius College	Canisius Golden Griffins	"Canisius College March" and "Drive Canisius"	
Capital University	Capital Comets	"Pride of the Purple"	
Carnegie Mellon University	Carnegie Mellon Tartans	"Fight for the Glory of Carnegie"	
Carthage College	Carthage Firebirds	"Carthage Fight Song"	
Case Western Reserve University	Case Western Reserve Spartans	"Fight On, Case Reserve"	
Catholic University of America	Catholic University Cardinals	"C. U. Marching Song"	
Clark Atlanta University	CAU Panthers	"Hail! Roaring Panthers"	
City College of New York	CCNY Beavers	"CCNY Fight Song"	
Centenary College of Louisiana	Centenary Gentlemen and Ladies	"Centenary Fight Song"	
University of Central Arkansas	Central Arkansas Bears and Sugar Bears	"UCA Fight Song"	
Central Connecticut State University	Central Connecticut Blue Devils	"C.C.S.U. Victory"	
Central Methodist University	Central Methodists Eagles	"Fighting Eagles"	
Central Michigan University	Central Michigan Chippewas	"The Fighting Chippewa"	
University of Central Missouri	Central Missouri Mules and Jennies	"Go Mules"	
University of Central Oklahoma	Central Oklahoma Bronchos	"UCO Fight Song"	
Central State University	Central State Marauders and Lady Marauders	"Fight for CSU"	
Central Washington University	Central Washington Wildcats	"CWU Fight Song"	
Centre College	Centre Colonels	"The Gold and White"	
University of North Carolina at Charlotte	Charlotte 49ers	"Charlotte Fight Song"	
University of Tennessee at Chattanooga	Chattanooga Mocs	"Fight, Chattanooga!"	
University of Chicago	Chicago Maroons	"Wave the Flag"	
California State University, Chico	Chico State Wildcats	"Chico State Fight Song"	
Christopher Newport University	Christopher Newport Captains	"Fight Song"	
University of Cincinnati	Cincinnati Bearcats	Cheer Cincinnati"	
The Citadel	The Citadel Bulldogs	"Dixie"	
PennWest Clarion	Clarion Golden Eagles	"Carry On for Clarion"	
Clayton State University	Clayton State Lakers	"Clayton State Fight Song"	
Clemson University	Clemson Tigers	"Tiger Rag (Clemson Fight Song)"	
Cleveland State University	Cleveland State Vikings	"The Pride of Cleveland"	
United States Coast Guard Academy	Coast Guard Bears	"Semper Paratus"	
Coastal Carolina University	Coastal Carolina Chanticleers	"Coastal Carolina Fight Song"	
Coe College	Coe Kohawks	"Coe Fight Song"	
Colgate University	Colgate Raiders	"Fight, Fight, Fight	
University of Colorado Boulder	Colorado Buffaloes	"CU Fight Song"	
Colorado School of Mines	Colorado Mines Orediggers	"The Mines Fight Song"	
Colorado State University	Colorado State Rams	"Colorado State University Fight Song"	
Columbia University	Columbia Lions	"Roar, Lion, Roar"	
Columbus State University	Columbus State Cougars	"Cougar Fight"	
Concordia University Chicago	Concordia-Chicago Cougars	"Marching with Concordia"	
Concordia University, St. Paul	Concordia Golden Bears	"Concordia Fight Song"	
Converse University	Converse Valkyries	"Ride of the Valkyries"	
Cornell University	Cornell Big Red	"Give My Regards to Davy"	
Creighton University	Creighton Bluejays	"The White and the Blue"	
Colorado State University-Pueblo	CSU Pueblo ThunderWolves	"CSU-Pueblo ThunderWolves Fight Song"	
Dakota State University	Dakota State Trojans	"DSU Fight Song"	
Dartmouth College	Dartmouth Big Green	"As the Backs Go Tearing By"	
Davidson College	Davidson Wildcats	"O Davidson"	
University of Dayton	Dayton Flyers	"Victory"	
University of Delaware	Delaware Fightin' Blue Hens	"The Delaware Fight Song	
Denison University	Denison Big Red	"Denison Marching Song"	
University of Denver	Denver Pioneers	"Fairest of Colleges"	
DePaul University	DePaul Blue Demons	"Blue Demons Fight Song"	
DePauw University	DePauw Tigers	"Here's to DePauw"	
University of Detroit Mercy	Detroit Mercy Titans	"The Titan Way"	
Dickinson College	Dickinson Red Devils	"Fight, Fight for Dickinson"	
Drake University	Drake Bulldogs	"The 'D' Song"	
Drexel University	Drexel Dragons	"Drexel Fight Song"	
Duke University	Duke Blue Devils	"Fight! Blue Devils, Fight!"	
Duquesne University	Duquesne Dukes	"Victory Song (Red and Blue)"	
Earlham College	Earlham Quakers	*"Fight Fight Inner Light"; "Battle Hymn of the Quakers"; "Theme of the Quaker Army"; "How Can We Keep from Scoring"; "Rah–Rah–Rio–Rem"	
East Carolina University	East Carolina Pirates	"E.C. Victory"	
East Central University	East Central Tigers	"ECU Fight Song"	
East Stroudsburg University of Pennsylvania	East Stroudsburg Warriors	"Hail Dear Old Stroudsburg"	
East Tennessee State University	East Tennessee State Buccaneers	"ETSU Fight Song"	
Eastern Illinois University	Eastern Illinois Panthers	"Eastern Loyalty (EIU Fight Song)"	
Eastern Kentucky University	Eastern Kentucky Colonels	*"Rally Maroon and White"; "Hail, Hail Eastern Maroons"	
Eastern Michigan University	Eastern Michigan Eagles	"Eastern Eagles Fight Song"	
Eastern Oregon University	Eastern Oregon Mountaineers	"Mount Up"	
Eastern Washington University	Eastern Washington Eagles	"Go Eags!"	
PennWest Edinboro	Edinboro Fighting Scots	"Scotland the Brave"	
Elmira College	Elmira Soaring Eagles	"Go E-L-M-I-R-A ! (EC Fight Song)"	
Elon University	Elon Phoenix	"Here's to Elon, Let's Win This Game"	
University of Evansville	Evansville Purple Aces	"Hail to Evansville"	
Evergreen State College	Evergreen Geoducks	"The Geoduck Fight Song"	
Fairfield University	Fairfield Stags	"The Fairfield University Fight Song"	
Fairmont State University	Fairmont State Fighting Falcons	"Maroon and White"	
Ferris State University	Ferris State Bulldogs	"Fighting Bulldogs"	
University of Findlay	Findlay Oilers	"Findlay Fight Song"	
Florida International University	FIU Panthers	"We are the Panthers"	
University of Florida	Florida Gators	"The Orange and Blue"	
Florida A&M University	Florida A&M Rattlers	"Our Florida"	
Florida Atlantic University	Florida Atlantic Owls	"FAU Fight Song"	
Florida State University	Florida State Seminoles	"The Fight Song"	
Fordham University	Fordham Rams	"Fordham Ram"	
Franklin College (Indiana)	Franklin Grizzlies	"Stand Up and Cheer"	
Franklin & Marshall College	Franklin & Marshall Diplomats	"On Down the Field"	
California State University, Fresno	Fresno State Bulldogs	"Fight, Varsity"	
Furman University	Furman Paladins	"Hail the White and Purple"	
George Mason University	George Mason Patriots	"Onward to Victory"	
George Washington University	George Washington Colonials	"Hail the Buff and Blue"	
Georgetown University	Georgetown Hoyas	"There Goes Old Georgetown"	
University of Georgia	Georgia Bulldogs	"Hail to Georgia"	
Georgia Southern University	Georgia Southern Eagles	"Southern Fight"	
Georgia State University	Georgia State Panthers	"Fight Panthers"	
Georgia Tech	Georgia Tech Yellow Jackets	"Up with the White and Gold"; "Ramblin' Wreck from Georgia Tech"	
Gettysburg College	Gettysburg Bullets	"Loyalty Song"	
Gonzaga University	Gonzaga Bulldogs	"For the White and the Blue" and "Bulldogs of Gonzaga"	
Grambling State University	Grambling State Tigers	"Fight for Dear Old Grambling"	
Grand Valley State University	Grand Valley State Lakers	"GVSU Victory"	
University of Wisconsin–Green Bay	Green Bay Phoenix	"Phoenix Fight Song"	
Grinnell College	Grinnell Pioneers	"Here Come the Pioneers!"	
Grove City College	Grove City Wolverine	"Stand Up and Cheer!"	
Guilford College	Guilford Quakers	"Brave Ole' Guilford Team!"	
Gustavus Adolphus College	Gustavus Golden Gusties	"Gustie Rouser"	
Hamilton College	Hamilton Continentals	"We Never Will Forget Thee"	
Hampton University	Hampton Pirates	"Hampton Fight Song"	
University of Hartford	Hartford Hawks	"Hartford, On to Victory"	
Harvard University	Harvard Crimson	*"Ten Thousand Men of Harvard"; "Harvardiana", "Veritas"; "Soldiers Field"; "Gridiron King", "Yo-Ho"; "Onward Crimson"; "Fair Harvard", "RAD"; "Fight Fiercely, Harvard"	
Haverford College	Haverford Fords	"Football Song"	
University of Hawai'i	Hawaii Rainbow Warriors	"Co-Ed Fight Song"	
Heidelberg University (Ohio)	Heidelberg Student Princes	"Heidelberg Victory March"	
High Point University	High Point Panthers	"Panther Pride"	
Hillsdale College	Hillsdale Chargers	"Hillsdale Fight Song (Charge On)"	
Hiram College	Hiram Terriers	"Hooray for Hiram"	
Hofstra University	Hofstra Pride	"Hofstra Fight Song"	
College of the Holy Cross	Holy Cross Crusaders	"Chu-Chu Rah-Rah"	
Hope College	Hope Flying Dutchmen	"Hope College Fight Song"	
Houston Christian University	Houston Christian Huskies	"Get Up & Go You Mighty Huskies"	
University of Houston	Houston Cougars	"Cougar Fight Song"	
Howard University	Howard Bison	"Howard University Fight Song"	
Howard Payne University	Howard Payne Yellow Jackets	"HPU Fight Song"	
University of Idaho	Idaho Vandals	"Go, Vandals, Go"	
Idaho State University	Idaho State Bengals	"Growl, Bengals, Growl"	
University of Illinois Urbana-Champaign	Illinois Fighting Illini	"Oskee Wow Wow"	
Illinois State University	Illinois State Redbirds	"Go, You Redbirds"	
Illinois Wesleyan University	Illinois Wesleyan Titans	"Fight Wesleyan!"	
University of the Incarnate Word	Incarnate Word Cardinals	"Cardinal Fight"	
Indiana University Bloomington	Indiana Hoosiers	"Indiana, Our Indiana"	
Indiana State University	Indiana State Sycamores	"March On! (You Fighting Sycamores)"; "Cheer for the Blue and White"	
University of Indianapolis	Indianapolis Greyhounds	"U of Indianapolis Fight Song"	
University of Iowa	Iowa Hawkeyes	"Iowa Fight Song"	
Iowa State University	Iowa State Cyclones	"ISU Fights"	
Indiana University–Purdue University Indianapolis	IUPUI Jaguars	"Let's Go Jags"	
Jackson State University	Jackson State Tigers	"Cheer Boys"	
Jacksonville University	Jacksonville Dolphins	"JU Dolphin Fight Song"	
Jacksonville State University	Jacksonville State Gamecocks	"JSU Fight Song"	
James Madison University	James Madison Dukes	"JMU Fight Song"	
John Carroll University	John Carroll Blue Streaks	"Onward John Carroll"	
Johns Hopkins University	Johns Hopkins Blue Jays	"To Win", "Black and Blue" and "Johnny Hopkins on to Victory"	
Juniata College	Juniata Eagles	"Fight On, JC"	
Kalamazoo College	Kalamazoo Hornets	"All Hail to Kazoo"	
University of Kansas	Kansas Jayhawks	"I'm a Jayhawk"	
Kansas State University	Kansas State Wildcats	"Wildcat Victory"	
Kennesaw State University	Kennesaw State Owls	"KSU Fight Song"	
Kent State University	Kent State Golden Flashes	"Fight On for KSU"	
University of Kentucky	Kentucky Wildcats	"On, On, U of K"	
Kentucky Wesleyan College	Kentucky Wesleyan Panthers	"KWC Fight Song"	
Kilgore College	Kilgore Rangers	"Kilgore Rangers Song"	
Knox College	Knox Prairie Fire	"Hail! Knox All-Glorious" and "Fight, Siwash"	
La Salle University	La Salle Explorers	"La Salle Fight Song"	
Lafayette College	Lafayette Leopards	"On, Lafayette"	
Lake Forest College	Lake Forest Foresters	"Fight for Lake Forest"	
Lamar University	Lamar Cardinals and Lady Cardinals	"Big Red"	
Lawrence University	Lawrence Vikings	"Viking Song"	
Lawrence Technological University	Lawrence Tech Blue Devils	"Dear Old L.I.T."	
Lehigh University	Lehigh Mountain Hawks	"Rearing Tearing"	
Liberty University	Liberty Flames and Lady Flames	"Fan The Flames!"	
California State University, Long Beach	Long Beach State Beach	"Long Beach State Fight Song"	
Longwood University	Longwood Lancers	"Hail to Longwood U"	
University of Louisiana at Lafayette	Louisiana Ragin' Cajuns	"Ragin' Cajuns Fight Song"	
Louisiana Christian University	Louisiana Christian Wildcats and Lady Wildcats	"Fightin' Wildcats"	
University of Louisiana at Monroe	Louisiana–Monroe Warhawks	"ULM Fight Song"	
Louisiana Tech University	Louisiana Tech Bulldogs and Lady Techsters	"Tech Fight, Go Bulldogs"	
University of Louisville	Louisville Cardinals	"Fight, U of L"	
Loyola University Chicago	Loyola Ramblers	"Go Loyola"	
Loyola University New Orleans	Loyola Wolf Pack	"Loyola Fight Song"	
Loyola Marymount University	Loyola Marymount Lions	"Fight On Loyola"	
Louisiana State University	LSU Tigers	"Fight for LSU"	
Luther College (Iowa)	Luther Norse	"Field Song"	
University of Maine	Maine Black Bears	"For Maine"	
Marist College	Marist Red Foxes	"The Marist Song"	
Marquette University	Marquette Golden Eagles	"Ring Out, Ahoya!"	
Marshall University	Marshall Thundering Herd	"Sons of Marshall"	
University of Maryland, College Park	Maryland Terrapins	"Maryland Fight Song"	
McNeese State University	McNeese State Cowboys and Cowgirls	"On McNeese"	
University of Memphis	Memphis Tigers	"Go! Tigers! Go!"	
Mercer University	Mercer Bears	"Hail to Mercer"	
United States Merchant Marine Academy	Merchant Marine Mariners	"King's Point Victory"	
University of Miami	Miami Hurricanes	"Miami U How-Dee-Doo" and "Hail to the Spirit of Miami U"	
Miami University	Miami RedHawks	"Miami Fight Song"	
University of Michigan	Michigan Wolverines	"The Victors"	
Michigan State University	Michigan State Spartans	"Victory for MSU"	
Michigan Technological University	Michigan Tech Huskies	"Fight Tech Fight"	
MidAmerica Nazarene University	MidAmerica Nazarene Pioneers	"Pioneer Fight Song"	
Middle Tennessee State University	Middle Tennessee Blue Raiders	"MTSU Fight Song"	
Middlebury College	Middlebury Panthers	"Cheer, Boys, Cheer"	
Midwestern State University	Midwestern State Mustangs	"Here's to the Maroon and Gold"	
University of Wisconsin–Milwaukee	Milwaukee Panthers	"UWM Fight Song"	
University of Minnesota Duluth	Minnesota Duluth Bulldogs	"Minnesota-Duluth Rouser"	
University of Minnesota Morris	UMM Cougars	"Minnesota-Morris Rouser"	
University of Minnesota	Minnesota Golden Gophers	"Minnesota Rouser"	
Minnesota State University, Mankato	Minnesota State Mavericks	"The Minnesota State Rouser"	
Mississippi College	Mississippi College Choctaws	"Mississippi College Fight Song"	
Mississippi State University	Mississippi State Bulldogs	"Hail State"	"
Mississippi Valley State University	Mississippi Valley Delta Devils	"Devils Gun"	
University of Missouri	Missouri Tigers	"Fight Tiger"	
Missouri State University	Missouri State Bears and Lady Bears	"The Scotsman"	
Missouri University of Science and Technology	Missouri S&T Miners	"Fight, Miners"	
Missouri Western State University	Missouri Western Griffons	"Missouri Western Fight Song"	
Massachusetts Institute of Technology	MIT Engineers	"The Engineer's Drinking Song"	
Monmouth College	Monmouth Fighting Scots	"Monmouth College, Hail to Thee!"	
Monmouth University	Monmouth Hawks	Fight for Dear Old Monmouth"	
University of Montana	Montana Grizzlies and Lady Griz	"Up With Montana"	
Montana State University	Montana State Bobcats	"Stand Up and Cheer"	
Montana State University Billings	Montana State Billings Yellowjackets	"MSU-B Fight Song"	
Morehead State University	Morehead State Eagles	"Fight for Morehead"	
Morgan State University	Morgan State Bears	"Fight on 'ole Morgan Grizzly	
Mount St. Joseph University	Mount St. Joseph Lions	"MSJ Fight Song"	
University of Mount Union	Mount Union Purple Raiders	"On, Mount to Victory!"	
Murray State University	Murray State Racers	"Murray State Fight Song"	
United States Naval Academy	Navy Midshipmen	"Anchors Aweigh"	
University of Nebraska–Lincoln	Nebraska Cornhuskers	"Hail Varsity", "The Cornhusker", " March of the Cornhuskers", and "Dear Old Nebraska U"	
University of Nebraska at Kearney	Nebraska–Kearney Lopers	"UNK Fight Song" and "UNK Color Song"	
University of Nevada, Reno	Nevada Wolf Pack	"Hail to Our Sturdy Men"	
University of New Hampshire	New Hampshire Wildcats	"On to Victory"	
University of New Mexico	New Mexico Lobos	"Hail New Mexico"	
New Mexico Highlands University	New Mexico Highlands Cowboys and Cowgirls	"Highlands Fight Song"	
New Mexico State University	New Mexico State Aggies	"Aggies oh Aggies"	
University of New Orleans	New Orleans Privateers	"Let's Hear It For UNO"	
Niagara University	Niagara Purple Eagles	"Here's to Old Niagara"	
Nicholls State University	Nicholls Colonels	"Nicholls State Colonels Fight Song"	
Norfolk State University	Norfolk State Spartans	"Norfolk State Fight Song"	
University of North Alabama	North Alabama Lions	"North Alabama Fight Song", "UNA Fight Song", and "Go, Fight for UNA"	
University of North Carolina at Chapel Hill	North Carolina Tar Heels	"I'm a Tar Heel Born"	
North Carolina Agricultural and Technical State University	North Carolina A&T Aggies	"Aggie Fight Song"	
North Carolina State University	NC State Wolfpack	"The NCSU Fight Song" "The Red and White Song"	
North Central College	North Central Cardinals	"Cardinal Fight Song"	
University of North Dakota	North Dakota Fighting Hawks	*"Fight On Sioux": "It's For You, North Dakota U"; "Stand Up and Cheer"	
North Dakota State University	North Dakota State Bison	"On Bison"	
North Park University	North Park Vikings	"NPU Fight Song"	
University of North Texas	North Texas Mean Green	"Fight, North Texas"	
Northeastern University	Northeastern Huskies	"All Hail Northeastern"	
Northeastern Illinois University	Northeastern Illinois Golden Eagles	"Go Golden Eagles"	
Northeastern State University	Northeastern State RiverHawks	"Northeastern, Northeastern"	
Northern Arizona University	Northern Arizona Lumberjacks	"Lumberjack Fight Song"	
University of Northern Colorado	Northern Colorado Bears	"UNC Fight Song"	
Northern Illinois University	Northern Illinois Huskies	"Huskie Fight Song"	
University of Northern Iowa	Northern Iowa Panthers	"UNI Fight Song"	
Northern Kentucky University	Northern Kentucky Norse	"Onward Ye Norsemen"	
Northern Michigan University	Northern Michigan Wildcats	"Northern Michigan Fight Song"	
Northwest Missouri State University	Northwest Missouri State Bearcats	"Wings of Victory"	
Northwest Nazarene University	Northwest Nazarene Nighthawks	"Victory Is Sure"	
Northwestern University	Northwestern Wildcats	"Go U Northwestern"	
Northwestern Oklahoma State University	Northwestern Oklahoma State Rangers	"Ride Rangers"	
Northwestern State University	Northwestern State Demons and Lady Demons	"Demon Fight Song"	
University of Notre Dame	Notre Dame Fighting Irish	"Notre Dame Victory March"	
New York University	NYU Violets	"Old New York University"	
Oakland University	Oakland Golden Grizzlies	"OU Fight"	
Oberlin College	Oberlin Yeomen	"Ten-Thousand Strong"	
Occidental College	Occidental Tigers	"Io Triumphe"	
Ohio University	Ohio Bobcats	"Stand up and Cheer"	
Ohio Northern University	Ohio Northern Polar Bears	"Friends of ONU"	
Ohio State University	Ohio State Buckeyes	*"Buckeye Battle Cry": "Across the Field"	
Ohio Wesleyan University	Ohio Wesleyan Battling Bishops	"OWU Fight Song"	
University of Oklahoma	Oklahoma Sooners	"Boomer Sooner"	
Oklahoma Christian University	Oklahoma Christian Eagles and Lady Eagles	"Stand Up and Cheer"	
Oklahoma State University–Stillwater	Oklahoma State Cowboys and Cowgirls	"Ride 'Em Cowboys"	
Old Dominion University	Old Dominion Monarchs	"Fight, Old Dominion"	
University of Mississippi	Ole Miss Rebels	"Forward Rebels"	
University of Nebraska Omaha	Omaha Mavericks	"UNO Fite"	
Oral Roberts University	Oral Roberts Golden Eagles	"Spirit Song"	
University of Oregon	Oregon Ducks	"Mighty Oregon"	
Oregon State University	Oregon State Beavers	"Hail to Old OSU"	
Ouachita Baptist University	Ouachita Baptist Tigers	"Ouachita Baptist Song"	
University of the Pacific	Pacific Tigers	"UoP Fight Song"	
Pacific Lutheran University	Pacific Lutheran Lutes	"PLU Fight Song"	
University of Pennsylvania	Penn Quakers	"Fight on, Pennsylvania!"	
Pennsylvania State University	Penn State Nittany Lions	"Fight On, State"	
Pepperdine University	Pepperdine Waves	"Fight Fight Fight for Pepperdine"	
Pittsburg State University	Pittsburg State Gorillas	"On To Victory"	
University of Pittsburgh	Pittsburgh Panthers	"Hail to Pitt"	
University of Portland	Portland Pilots	"Pilot Fight Song"	
Portland State University	Portland State Vikings	"Fight for Portland State"	
Prairie View A&M University	Prairie View A&M Panthers and Lady Panthers	"Mighty Panthers"	
Princeton University	Princeton Tigers	"The Princeton Cannon Song"	
Providence College	Providence Friars	"When the Saints Go Marching In"	
University of Puget Sound	Puget Sound Loggers	"Fight for UPS"	
Purdue University	Purdue Boilermakers	"Hail Purdue!"	
Purdue University Fort Wayne	Purdue Fort Wayne Mastodons	"Go, Dons!"	
Quincy University (Illinois)	Quincy Hawks	"QU Fight Song"	
Quinnipiac University	Quinnipiac Bobcats	"Bobcat Roar"	
Radford University	Radford Highlanders	*"R.U. Fight Song": "Honor and Glory"	
University of Rhode Island	Rhode Island Rams	"Rhode Island Cheer Song" and "Rhode Island Born"	
Rhodes College	Rhodes Lynx	"Roll On"	
Rice University	Rice Owls	"Rice Fight Song"	
University of Richmond	Richmond Spiders	"Spider Born"	
Rochester Institute of Technology	RIT Tigers	"Our Spirit Shows"	
Roanoke College	Roanoke Maroons	"Maroon Victory"	
Robert Morris University	Robert Morris Colonials	"RMU Fight Song"	
Robert Morris University Illinois	Robert Morris Eagles	"RMC Fight Song"	
University of Rochester	Rochester Yellowjackets	"March, men of Rochester"	
Rose-Hulman Institute of Technology	Rose–Hulman Fightin' Engineers	"Dear Old Rose"	
Rensselaer Polytechnic Institute	RPI Engineers	"Hail, Dear Old Rensselaer"	
Rutgers University–New Brunswick	Rutgers Scarlet Knights	"The Bells Must Ring"	
California State University, Sacramento	Sacramento State Hornets	"Fight Hornet Fight"	
Sacred Heart University	Sacred Heart Pioneers	"Pioneer Fight Song"	
Saginaw Valley State University	Saginaw Valley State Cardinals	"Cardinal Fight"	
St. Bonaventure University	St. Bonaventure Bonnies	"Unfurl the Brown and White"	
St. Cloud State University	St. Cloud State Huskies	"St. Cloud State Rouser"	
St. Francis Xavier University	St. Francis Xavier X-Men	"Hail & Health"	
St. John's University (New York City)	St. John's Red Storm	"Fight For Old St. John's"	
Saint Joseph's University	Saint Joseph's Hawks	"When the Hawks Go Flying In" and "Mine Eyes"	
St. Lawrence University	St. Lawrence Saints	"The Scarlet and The Brown"	
Saint Louis University	Saint Louis Billikens	"We Hail Saint Louis U."	
St. Mary's College of Maryland	St. Mary's Seahawks	"Fly High Mighty Seahawks"	
St. Norbert College	St. Norbert Green Knights	"St. Norbert Fight Song"	
St. Olaf College	St. Olaf Oles	"Um Ya Ya"	
Sam Houston State University	Sam Houston State Bearkats	"Bearkat Fight Song"	
Samford University	Samford Bulldogs	"Samford Fight Song"	
San Diego State University	San Diego State Aztecs	"SDSU Fight Song"	
University of San Francisco	San Francisco Dons	"Victory Song"	
San Francisco State University	San Francisco State Gators	"State Victory Song"	
San Jose State University	San Jose State Spartans	"San Jose State Fight Song"	
Santa Clara University	Santa Clara Broncos	"Fight For Santa Clara"	
Seton Hall University	Seton Hall Pirates	"Onward Setonia"	
Shepherd University	Shepherd Rams	"Fight On" (For Old SU)"	
Shippensburg University of Pennsylvania	Shippensburg Raiders	"The Horse"	
Siena College	Siena Saints	"S-I-E-N-A"	
Southern Illinois University Edwardsville	SIU Edwardsville Cougars	"SIU-E Fight Song"	
Slippery Rock University of Pennsylvania	Slippery Rock The Rock	"SRU Fight Song"	
Southern Methodist University	SMU Mustangs	"Peruna"	
University of South Alabama	South Alabama Jaguars	"South"	
University of South Carolina	South Carolina Gamecocks	"The Fighting Gamecocks Lead the Way"	
South Carolina State University	South Carolina State Bulldogs and Lady Bulldogs	"Bulldog Fight Song"	
University of South Dakota	South Dakota Coyotes	"Hail South Dakota"	
South Dakota State University	South Dakota State Jackrabbits	"Ring the Bells"	
University of South Florida	South Florida Bulls	"Golden Brahman March"	
Southeast Missouri State University	Southeast Missouri State Redhawks	"SEMO Fight Song"	
Southeastern Louisiana University	Southeastern Louisiana Lions and Lady Lions	"Cheer Our Team"	
Southeastern Oklahoma State University	Southeastern Oklahoma State Savage Storm	"Southeastern"	
Southern University	Southern Jaguars and Lady Jaguars	"Southern Fight"	
Southern Illinois University Carbondale	Southern Illinois Salukis	"Go! Southern! Go!"	
University of Southern Mississippi	Southern Miss Golden Eagles	"Southern to the Top"	
Southwest Baptist University	Southwest Baptist Bearcats	"SBU Fight Song"	
Springfield College	Springfield Pride	"Go Get 'Um, Springfield"	
Stanford University	Stanford Cardinal	"Come Join the Band"	
Stephen F. Austin State University	Stephen F. Austin Lumberjacks and Ladyjacks	"SFA Fight Song"	
Swarthmore College	Swarthmore Garnet Tide	"Hip, Hip, Hip, for Old Swarthmore"	
Syracuse University	Syracuse Orange	"Down, Down the Field"	
Taylor University	Taylor Trojans	"On Ye Tarleton"	
Texas Christian University	TCU Horned Frogs	TCU Fight Song"	
Temple University	Temple Owls	"T for Temple U" and "Fight! Temple Fight!"	
University of Tennessee	Tennessee Volunteers	"Down the Field"	
Tennessee State University	Tennessee State Tigers and Lady Tigers	"I'm So Glad"	
Tennessee Technological University	Tennessee Tech Golden Eagles	"There They Go Again"	
University of Texas at Austin	Texas Longhorns	"Texas Fight"	
Texas A&M University	Texas A&M Aggies	"Aggie War Hymn"	
Texas A&M University–Commerce	Texas A&M–Commerce Lions	"A&M-Commerce Fight Song"	
Texas A&M University–Kingsville	Texas A&M–Kingsville Javelinas	"Jalisco and Javelina Victory March"	
Texas Southern University	Texas Southern Tigers	"TSU Fight Song"	
Texas State University	Texas State Bobcats	"Go Bobcats!"	
Texas Tech University	Texas Tech Red Raiders	"Fight Raiders, Fight"	
Texas Woman's University	Texas Woman's Pioneers	"Daughters of Texas"	
University of Toledo	Toledo Rockets	"Fight for Dear Old T U"	
Towson University	Towson Tigers	"Hail Towson"	
Trinity College (Connecticut)	Trinity Bantams	"TC Fight Song"	
Troy University	Troy Trojans	"Trojans, One and All"	
Truman State University	Truman Bulldogs	"Hail to the Bulldogs"	
Tufts University	Tufts Jumbos	"Tuftonia's Day"	
Tulane University	Tulane Green Wave	"Roll On Tulane (The Olive and the Blue)"	
University of Tulsa	Tulsa Golden Hurricane	"Hurricane Spirit"	
University of Alabama at Birmingham	UAB Blazers	"UAB Blazer Fight Song"	
University of California, Davis	UC Davis Aggies	"Aggie Fight"	
University of California, Irvine	UC Irvine Anteaters	"U-C-I Fight", "UCI Anteaters", and We Raise our Voice in Love and Unity"	
University of California, Riverside	UC Riverside Highlanders	"Brave Scots"	
University of California, San Diego	UC San Diego Tritons	"Triton Fight Song"	
University of California, Santa Barbara	UC Santa Barbara Gauchos	"El 'C' Grande"	
University of Central Florida	UCF Knights	"Charge On"	
University of California, Los Angeles	UCLA Bruins	"Sons of Westwood" "Mighty Bruins"	
University of Connecticut	UConn Huskies	"UConn Husky"	
University of Illinois at Chicago	UIC Flames	"Fire Up Flames!"	
University of Massachusetts Amherst	UMass Minutemen and Minutewomen	"Fight Mass"	
University of Massachusetts Lowell	UMass Lowell River Hawks	"River Hawk Pride"	
University of Maryland, Baltimore County	UMBC Retrievers	"UMBC Riser"	
University of North Carolina at Pembroke	UNC Pembroke Braves	"UNC-P Fight Song"	
University of North Carolina at Wilmington	UNC Wilmington Seahawks	"Green and Gold"	
University of Nevada, Las Vegas	UNLV Rebels	"Win with the Rebels"	
Upper Iowa University	Upper Iowa Peacocks	"UIU Fight Song"	
Ursinus College	Ursinus Bears	"Ursinus Fight Song"	
University of Southern California	USC Trojans	"Fight On"	
University of Utah	Utah Utes	"Utah Man"	
Utah State University	Utah State Aggies	"Utah State Fight Song"	
Utah Valley University	Utah Valley Wolverines	"Stand Up and Cheer, UVSC"	
University of Texas at Arlington	UT Arlington Mavericks	"UTA Fight Song"	
University of Texas at El Paso	UTEP Miners	"UTEP Fight Song" and "Miners Fight"	
University of Texas at San Antonio	UTSA Roadrunners	"UTSA Fight Song"	
University of Wisconsin–Eau Claire	UW-Eau Claire Blugolds	"Onward to Victory"	
University of Wisconsin–Oshkosh	UW Oshkosh Titans	"Hail Titans"	
Valdosta State University	Valdosta State Blazers	"Valdosta State Fight Song"	
Valparaiso University	Valparaiso Beacons	"Valpo Fight Song"	
Vanderbilt University	Vanderbilt Commodores	"Dynamite"	
Minnesota North College – Vermilion	Vermilion Ironhawks	"Roll Up The Score"	
University of Vermont	Vermont Catamounts	"Vermont Victorious"	
Villanova University	Villanova Wildcats	"V for Villanova"	
University of Virginia	Virginia Cavaliers	"The Cavalier Song"	
Virginia Military Institute	VMI Keydets	"VMI Spirit"	
Virginia Tech	Virginia Tech Hokies	"Tech Triumph"	
Wabash College	Wabash Little Giants	"Old Wabash"	
Wake Forest University	Wake Forest Demon Deacons	"O Here's to Wake Forest"	
Wartburg College	Watburg Knights	"Fight on Knights"	
University of Washington	Washington Huskies	"Bow Down to Washington"	
Washington and Lee University	Washington and Lee Generals	"Washington and Lee Swing"	
Washington State University	Washington State Cougars	"Washington State University Fight Song"	
Wayne State University	Wayne State Warriors	"War March of the Warriors"	
Weber State University	Weber State Wildcats	"We Are the Wildcats"	
Wesleyan University	Wesleyan Cardinals	"Wesleyan Fight Song"	
West Chester University	West Chester Golden Rams	"Rams Fight"	
West Texas A&M University	West Texas A&M Buffaloes	"On, On Buffaloes"	
West Virginia University	West Virginia Mountaineers	"Hail, West Virginia"	
West Virginia State University	West Virginia State Yellow Jackets	"Hail to the Team"	
Western Carolina University	Western Carolina Catamounts	"Western Carolina Fight Song"	
Western Colorado University	Western Colorado Mountaineers	"Western State Fight Song"	
Western Illinois University	Western Illinois Leathernecks	"We Are Marching On"	
Western Kentucky University	Western Kentucky Hilltoppers and Lady Toppers	"WKU Fight Song"	
Western Michigan University	Western Michigan Broncos	"WMU Fight Song"	
Western Washington University	Western Washington Vikings	"Viking Victory March"	
Westminster College	Westminster Titans	"Westminster Victory"	
Whittier College	Whittier Poets	"Go Poets!"	
Wichita State University	Wichita State Shockers	"Shocker Fight Song"	
College of William & Mary	William & Mary Tribe	"Tribe Fight Song"	
William Jewell College	William Jewell Cardinals	"Fight William Jewell"	
Williams College	Williams Ephs	"Yard By Yard"	
University of Wisconsin–Madison	Wisconsin Badgers	"On, Wisconsin!"	
University of Wisconsin–Whitewater at Rock County		"Go Rattlers Go"	
University of Wisconsin–Whitewater	Wisconsin–Whitewater Warhawks	"Warhawk Battle Cry"	
Wittenberg University	Wittenberg Tigers	"Wittenberg Fight"	
College of Wooster	Wooster Fighting Scots	"Black and Gold"	
Wilbur Wright College	Wright College Rams	"Fight, Wright, Fight!"	
University of Wyoming	Wyoming Cowboys and Cowgirls	"Ragtime Cowboy Joe"	
Xavier University	Xavier Musketeers	"XU Fight Song"	
Yale University	Yale Bulldogs	"Bulldog"; "Down the Field"; "Boola Boola"; "Here's to Good Old Yale"; "Goodnight, Poor Hahvahd"; "Bingo"	
Youngstown State University	Youngstown State Penguins	"(Wave For The) Red and White"	

== List of professional sports team fight songs ==
=== Australia ===
League	Club	Team Name	Fight Song	Reference
AFL	Adelaide Football Club	Adelaide Crows	"The Pride of South Australia"	
AFL	Brisbane Lions Australian Football Club	Brisbane Lions	"The Pride of Brisbane Town"	
AFL	Carlton Football Club	Carlton Blues	"We are the Navy Blues"	
AFL	Collingwood Football Club	Collingwood Magpies	"Good Old Collingwood Forever"	
NRL	Cronulla Sutherland District Rugby League Football Club Ltd	Cronulla Sharks	"Up, Up Cronulla"	
AFL	Essendon Football Club	Essendon Bombers	"See The Bombers Fly Up"	
AFL	Fremantle Football Club	Fremantle Dockers	"Freo Way To Go"	
AFL	Geelong Football Club	Geelong Cats	"We Are Geelong"	
AFL	Gold Coast Football Club	Gold Coast Suns	"Suns of the Gold Coast Sky"	
AFL	Western Sydney Football Club Limited, trading as Greater Western Sydney Football Club	Greater Western Sydney Giants	"There's a Big Big Sound"	
AFL	Hawthorn Football Club	Hawthorn Hawks	"The Mighty Fighting Hawks"	
AFL	Melbourne Football Club	Melbourne Demons	"It's a Grand Old Flag"	
NRL	Melbourne Storm Rugby League Club	Melbourne Storm	"We Are the Storm"	
A-League	Melbourne Victory FC	Melbourne Victory	"Melbourne The Brave"	
AFL	North Melbourne Football Club	North Melbourne Kangaroos	"Join in the Chorus"	
A-League	Perth Glory FC	Perth Glory	"We Are the Glory"	
AFL	Port Adelaide Football Club	Port Adelaide Power	"Power to Win"	
AFL	Richmond Football Club	Richmond Tigers	"We're from Tigerland"	
AFL	St Kilda Football Club	St Kilda Saints	"When the Saints Go Marching In"	
NRL	South Sydney District Rugby League Football Club	South Sydney Rabbitohs	"Glory Glory to South Sydney"	
NRL	Eastern Suburbs District Rugby League Football Club	Sydney Roosters	"Easts to Win!"	
AFL	Sydney Swans Ltd	Sydney Swans	"The Red and the White"	
AFL	Indian Pacific Limited, trading as West Coast Eagles Football Club	West Coast Eagles	"We're Flying High"	
AFL	Footscray Football Club Limited	Western Bulldogs	"Sons of the West"	

=== Canada ===
League	Team Name	Fight Song	Reference
CFL	BC Lions	"Roar You Lions Roar!"	
NHL	Calgary Flames	"In Da Dome"	
CFL	Edmonton Elks	"Eskimo Fight Song"	
NHL	Montreal Canadiens	"Allez Montreal"	
CFL	Saskatchewan Roughriders	"Green Is The Color"	
MLB	Toronto Blue Jays	"OK, Blue Jays"	
MLS	Toronto FC	"The Legend TFC"	

=== Japan ===
Team Name	Fight Song	Reference
Orix Buffaloes	"Sky"	
Chiba Lotte Marines	"We Love Marines"	
Chunichi Dragons	"Burning Dragons"	
Fukuoka SoftBank Hawks	"Go Young Hawks"	
Hanshin Tigers	"The Hanshin Tigers' Song"	
Hiroshima Toyo Carp	"Let's Go, Carp"	
Hokkaido Nippon-Ham Fighters	"The Fighters' Song"	
Saitama Seibu Lions	"Roar, Lions"	
Tohoku Rakuten Golden Eagles	"Fly High! Rakuten Eagles"	
Tokyo Yakult Swallows	"Tokyo Ondo", "We Are The Swallows"	
Yomiuri Giants	"The Giants' Song - Fighting Spirit"	
Yokohama DeNA BayStars	"Passionate Star"	

=== United States ===
League	Team Name	Fight Song	Reference
MLB	Arizona Diamondbacks	"The DBacks Swing"	
NFL	Atlanta Falcons	"Fly High Falcons"	
MLB	Baltimore Orioles	"Orioles Magic"	
NFL	Baltimore Ravens	"The Baltimore Fight Song"	
MLB	Boston Red Sox	"Tessie"	
NBA	Brooklyn Nets	"Brooklyn, Something to Lean On"	
NFL	Buffalo Bills	"Shout"	
NHL	Buffalo Sabres	"We're Gonna Win That Cup"	
NFL	Chicago Bears	"Bear Down, Chicago Bears"	
NHL	Chicago Blackhawks	"Here Come the Hawks"	
MLB	Chicago Cubs	"Go, Cubs, Go"	
MLB	Chicago White Sox	"Let's Go, Go-Go White Sox"	
NFL	Cincinnati Bengals	"Bengals Growl"	
NFL	Cleveland Browns	"Hi-O Hi-O for Cleveland"	
NFL	Dallas Cowboys	"Cowboys Stampede March"	
NHL	Dallas Stars	"Puck Off"	
NFL	Detroit Lions	"Gridiron Heroes"	
MLB	Detroit Tigers	"Go Get'em Tigers"	
NHL	Florida Panthers	"Go Cats Go!"	
NFL	Green Bay Packers	"Go! You Packers Go!"	
MLB	Houston Astros	"Go Go Astros" or "Vamos Vamos Astros"	
NFL	Houston Texans	"Football Time in Houston" or "Pura Vida"	
NFL	Kansas City Chiefs	"The Chiefs Are On The Warpath"	
NFL	Las Vegas Raiders	"The Autumn Wind"	
MLB	Los Angeles Angels	"The California Team"	
NFL	Los Angeles Chargers	"San Diego Super Chargers"	
MLB	Los Angeles Dodgers	"Follow the Dodgers"	
NFL	Los Angeles Rams	"The Rams Marching Song"	
NFL	Miami Dolphins	"Dolphins Fight Song"	
MLB	Milwaukee Brewers	"Brewer Fever"	
MLB	Minnesota Twins	"We're Gonna Win, Twins"	
NFL	Minnesota Vikings	"Skol, Vikings"	
NHL	Minnesota Wild	"The State of Hockey"	
NFL	New Orleans Saints	"When the Saints Go Marching In"	
NFL	New York Giants	"Go Giants Go"	
MLB	New York Mets	"Meet the Mets"	
NHL	New York Rangers	"Rangers Victory Song"	
MLB	New York Yankees	"Here Come the Yankees"	
NBA	Philadelphia 76ers	"Here Come the Sixers"	
NFL	Philadelphia Eagles	"Fly, Eagles Fly"	
NHL	Philadelphia Flyers	"The Orange and the Black"	
MLB	Pittsburgh Pirates	"A New Pirate Generation"	
NFL	Pittsburgh Steelers	"Pittsburgh Steelers Polka", or "Here We Go"	
MLS	Portland Timbers	"Green is the Color"	
MLB	San Francisco Giants	"Bye, Bye, Baby"	
MLB	San Diego Padres	"Let's Go Padres"	
NHL	St. Louis Blues	"When the Blues Go Marching In"	
NFL	Tampa Bay Buccaneers	"Hey! Hey! Tampa Bay!"	
MLB	Tampa Bay Rays	"Feel The Heat, Rays"	
NFL	Washington Commanders	"Hail to the Commanders"	

== See also ==
- List of Australian Football League team songs
- Alma mater (song)
- Entrance music
- Football chant
- List of school songs
- Stadium anthem
- Theme music
- Music at sporting events
