= Rensselaer Polytechnic Institute songs =

There are several songs about Rensselaer Polytechnic Institute traditionally sung at special events.

== Here's to Old RPI ==
"Here's to Old RPI" is the Alma Mater of Rensselaer Polytechnic Institute. It is sung at various formal events. It is also played by the RPI Pep Band at Hockey games (when it is traditional to stand and sing along while the band is playing). It was written in 1897 by Edmund Fales, and was published in the first book of Songs of Rensselaer, printed in 1913.

=== Lyrics ===
Here's to old RPI, her fame may never die.
Here's to old Rensselaer, she stands today without a peer.
Here's to those olden days,
Here's to those golden days,
Here's to the friends we made at dear old RPI.

== All We've Learned at Rensselaer ==
"All We've Learned at Rensselaer" is a song written by Rensselyrics co-founder Tom Willner and traditionally sung by the Rensselyrics at the Rensselaer Polytechnic Institute commencement ceremonies. Each verse or section has a different musical style, several of which are closely based on Billy Joel songs or other popular music.

As many facets of life at RPI have changed over the years, the lyrics have changed appropriately. For example, "F-Test" (once the bane of all freshmen who had regularly scheduled 8am exam periods) has been replaced with "Chem Test". Likewise, the "Hole in the Wall" (a former eatery in RPI's Student Union) has been replaced by a new addition in the same building (the fishtank) and an existing feature (the pub).

However, some of the classes still referred to in the song no longer exist:

- COLD (Computer Organization and Logic Design), succeeded in the 1997-1998 catalog by "Computer Components & Operations" (CoCO)
- Lumps (Lumped Parameter Systems), very similar to what is now Dynamic Systems

Additionally, the stanza listing several buildings by their acronyms is somewhat outdated, as the school administration made a concerted effort to eliminate the acronym form of building names in the late 1990s (though many students and faculty continue to refer to the acronyms):

- JEC - J. Erik Jonsson Engineering Center
- JROWL - Jonsson-Rowland Science Center
- CII - George M. Low Center for Industrial Innovation
- DCC - Darrin Communications Center
- VCC - Voorhes Computing Center
- C+CC - Chapel and Cultural Center
- CDC - Career Development Center

Other acronyms:

- AML (Advanced Machining Lab)
- CAD (Computer-Aided Drawing)
- CAM (Computer-Aided Machining)
- CANOS (Computer Architecture, Networks and Operating Systems)
- CHUD (Computer Hardware Design)
- Diff EQ (Differential Equations)
- DSA (Data Structures and Algorithms)
- DMS (Design of Mechanical Systems)
- E-I (Electronic Instrumentation)
- EMAC (Electronic Media, Arts, and Communication)
- EMD (Elements of Machine Design)
- EPAL (Electric Power Analysis Lab)
- GMP (General Manufacturing Processes)
- IEA (Introduction to Engineering Analysis)
- IED (Introduction to Engineering Design)
- IPAC (Information and Personal Assistance Center)
- MAU (Modeling and Analysis of Uncertainty)
- MSL (Mechanical Systems Lab)
- O-Chem (Organic Chemistry)
- PDI (Programs in Design and Innovation)
- POMCA (Production Operations Management & Cost Accounting)
- S-O (Student Orientation)
- STS (Science and Technology Studies)
- TF1/2 (Thermal Fluids 1/2)
- UPAC (Union Programs and Activities Committee)

In more recent years, this entertaining song has been cut from the ceremony by administration at the last minute for unknown reasons. It was absent from the program for the 201st Commencement of the spring of 2007, though was present in earlier years.

=== Lyrics ===
All we've learned at Rensselaer from all we've had to do,
It started in our freshman year when we did not have a clue.
We knew about the hockey team, we heard about SO,
and without a doubt we soon found out about the ratio.

Well we played in Fresh Olympics and we ate the Commons food,
yes we slept through every Chem Test despite the caffeine we consumed.
We'd come home every evening back to painted concrete walls,
where we'd throw things at our roommates in those ancient freshman halls.

Some may search for refuge, find solace as a Greek,
we pledged ourselves, we rushed and hoped that we'd make it through hell week.
Then by lucky chance, or by begging for a grade or two,
we passed our freshman year, but we were hardly through.

There was:

I Mech, EMAC, Diff Eq and Chem Mat,
BTM, STS, IEA, and MPS.

Lumps, COLD, O Chem, Dirt, Anal, P Chem,
Complex, CANOS, they don't even pay us.

Quantum Psych-n-CHuD, Human Fac, Soc-n-CruD,
Bio, IED, Aeroelasticity.

Macro, Micro, Fluids and Thermo,
working in the lab all day, what else do we have to say.

Partial Credit, GPA, it's you, it's you, oh gods we serve,
we pray for salvation, so that we may ride the curve.

Mother's, Father's, the Bookstore, the Games Room,
the fishtank the pub and the Rat,
E-board, J-board, IPAC, UPAC,
We all pack's-a-matter of fact. (EMPAC!)

The Bursar, the Registrar, to West Hell or to Greene,
JEC, CII, DCC, VCC, CDC, C+CC.

but of all we've learned at Rensselaer from all we've had to do,
There's one thing that all sums it up, and it's in the following tune.

e to the x, dy/dx, e to the x dx
cosine, secant, tangent, sine,
three point one four one five nine
square root, cube root, log of pi,
dis-integrate them: RPI.

== Hail, Dear Old Rensselaer ==
"Hail, Dear Old Rensselaer" is the school's fight song. It is still played today by the RPI Pep Band at athletic events and other school functions. At some point someone updated the words of the fight song to make it more politically correct than it was back in the 60's. Where it now says "We all must do our part" used to be "Each man must do his part" and the line "True to old Rensselaer." used to be "True sons of Rensselaer."

=== Lyrics ===
Words and Music by Charles S. Root '34

Hail, dear old Rensselaer, the college of our heart.
For dear old Rensselaer, we all must do our part.
True to old Rensselaer, we'll always strive to be.
Now, dear old Rensselaer, hail to thee.

Hear the tramp, tramp, tramp of marching feet.
Hear the rat-tat-tat of drums that beat.
Hear the voices ringing loud and sweet.
Hear that mighty shout of ...

Hail, dear old Rensselaer, the college of our heart.
For dear old Rensselaer, we all must do our part.
True to old Rensselaer, we'll always strive to be.
Now, dear old Rensselaer, hail to thee.

== Can You Spell Rensselaer? ==
Throughout the school's history, incoming students and non-students experience difficulty with the spelling and pronunciation of "Rensselaer". While the local population of those native to Troy, New York colloquially use two syllables when saying the name (e.g., "ren'-slur"), the student population always uses three (e.g., "ren'-suh-leer"). This song, with words and music by E.M. Frost, 1911, aims to simplify the art of spelling the name.

=== Lyrics ===
Can you spell Rensselaer? R-E-N-S-S
If not, you're no Engineer. E-L-A-E-R
Come on, boys, now boys, come gather 'round,
And we'll sing a Rensselaer song on the town.
Then we'll give a yell,
In which we'll tell,
to everyone who's near –
That R-E-N-S-S-E-L-A-E-R spells 'Rensselaer'.
