= ASCAP boycott =

1941 boycott of the American Society of Composers, Authors and Publishers

The ASCAP boycott was a 1941 boycott of the American Society of Composers, Authors and Publishers (ASCAP) by radio broadcasters, due to license fees. From another perspective, it was a boycott of radio broadcasters by ASCAP, "concerned about the unlicensed radio broadcast of its members' material ..."

== Causes of the boycott ==
Between 1931 and 1939, ASCAP increased royalty rates charged to broadcasters some 448%.

In 1940, when ASCAP tried to triple its license fees, radio broadcasters prepared to resist their demands by enforcing a boycott of ASCAP, and inaugurating a competing royalty agency, Broadcast Music, Inc. (BMI). It is currently the largest performing rights organization in the United States and one of the largest in the world.

== Events of the boycott ==
During a ten-month period lasting from January 1 to October 29, 1941, no music licensed by ASCAP (1,250,000 songs) was broadcast on NBC or CBS radio stations. Instead, the stations played songs in the public domain, regional music, and styles (like rhythm and blues or country) that had been traditionally disdained by ASCAP, resulting in many classical compositions being recorded by the big bands.

== Resolution ==
When the differences between ASCAP and the broadcasters were resolved, ASCAP agreed to settle for a lower fee than they had initially demanded.

== Beneficiaries of the boycott ==
"Jeanie with the Light Brown Hair", an 1854 song, was a notorious beneficiary of the ASCAP boycott. According to Time magazine, "So often had BMI's Jeannie [sic] With the Light Brown Hair been played that she was widely reported to have turned grey." Another beneficiary was Glenn Miller's "Song of the Volga Boatmen".

== See also ==
- List of boycotts
