= List of songs about Chicago =

This is a list of songs about Chicago.

== 0–9 ==
- "1215 W. Belmont" - Carey Bell & Lurrie Bell
- "19th Street Blues" - Johnny Dodds & Tiny Parham
- "2120 South Michigan Avenue" – Rolling Stones
- "29th and Dearborn" – Richard M Jones
- "31st And State" - Johnny Griffin And Wilbur Ware With Junior Mance
- "39th And Indiana" - Charley Musselwhite
- "42 in Chicago" - Merle Kilgore
- "43rd Street Jump" - David "Honeyboy" Edwards, Sunnyland Slim, Big Walter Horton, Kansas City Red, Floyd Jones
- "47th Street Stomp" – Jimmy Bertrand's Washboard Wizards
- "5-3-10-4", 2000 – Maybe I'll Catch Fire - Alkaline Trio
- "55th Street" - Lidell Townsell
- "65th and Ingleside" - Chance the Rapper
- "70th & King Drive" – Hot Hanas Hula

== A ==
- "A Cicada Of Chicago" by Pepe Ahlqvist
- "An Afternoon in Midway Plaisance. Fantasie for Piano.", 1893 – composer: Gustav Luders
- "Another Rainy Day in New York City" - Chicago
- "All We Know" - The Chainsmokers
- "Angels" – Chance the Rapper from Coloring Book, 2016 (music video shows him rapping on top of the "L" train)
- "Apex Blues" – Jimmie Noone & His Apex Club Orchestra
- "Apostrophe to Chicago" – composer & lyricist: Mrs. Emily M. (Blakeslee) Boyden
- "Area 312" – Resurrection Band
- "At McKie's" – Sonny Rollins & Coleman Hawkins (McKie's was a famous Chicago jazz venue)
- "Ation" – Frode Gjerstad Trio With Steve Swell
- "Auch Chikago War Einmal Jung" – Katja Ebstein
- "Awake! Awake!" – composer & lyricist: Mrs. Emily M. (Blakeslee) Boyden

== B ==
- "Back Down On State Street" – Ben Sidran
- "Back Streets of Lombard" – Ground Zero
- "Back to Chicago" – Styx, from Edge of the Century, 1990
- "Bad, Bad Leroy Brown" – Jim Croce
- "The Ballad Of Jesse James" - various versions - see Jesse James (folk song)
- "Bamako Chicago Express" - Don Moye
- "Baseball Dreams" – Ralph's World
- "Battle of Chicago" – Berkshire Seven
- "Bear Down Chicago Bears" - John Frigo
- "The Belle of Chicago", 1892 – composer: John Philip Sousa
- "The Belle of Chicago Barn Dance" – composer: Theo. Bonheur
- "The Belle of Lincoln Park" – composer & lyricist: Geo. Maywood
- "Best Wishes to your Black Lung" – Less Than Jake
- "Big Bill the Builder" (mayor), 1928 – composers & lyricists: Milton Weil, Bernie Grossman & Larry Shay
- "The Big Brass Band from Brazil" by Art Mooney & His Orchestra
- "The Big Unit" – The Mountain Goats
- "Big Windy City" - Troy Shondell
- "The Billiken Man", 1909 – composer: Melville J. Gideon; lyricist: E. Ray Goetz; sung by Blanche Ring
- "Black Sox Two Step (Noir Chaussette's Two Step)" – Sidney Brown
- "Blank" - Disfigured
- "Bloody Canvas", 2021 – Polo G
- "Blowin' in from Chicago", 2005 – composer: Hank Hirsh; Six Perfections Music; Around and Back
- "Blue Line" – Local H
- "Blues for the South Side" – Ronnie Earl
- "Blues for the West Side" – Eddie Shaw
- "Boogie Woogie Bugle Boy" - Andrews Sisters
- "Boost Chicago" – composer: Armin P. Bauer
- "Born in Chicago" – Paul Butterfield 1965, blues
- "Born in Illinois (in a place they call Chicago)" - Mark "Big Poppa" Stampley
- "Bow to the Masta", 1999 – Kool Keith
- "Boy Reporter Blues, Dedicated to Horace Wade – Boy Reporter of the Chicago Evening American", 1924 – composers: Dell Lampe & J. Bodewalt Lampe; lyricist: Haven Gillespie
- "Break Down on Lake Shore Drive" – The Black Dog
- "Bryn Mawr Stomp" – Local H
- "Bucktown Stomp" – Johnny Dodds' Washboard Six
- "The Burning Iroquois" (theater), 1904 – composer: Edward Stanley; lyricist: Mathew Goodwin
- "The Burning of the Iroquois", 1904 – composer: Thos. R. Confare; lyricist: Morris S. Silver

== C ==
- "Calling Me Home, Chicago", 1985 – composer: Paul David Wilson
- "Casimir Pulaski Day" – Sufjan Stevens
- "Cha Cha Chicago" – Kai Winding
- "Chi-Chi-Chi-Chicago" – Nellie Lutcher
- "Chi'-Ca'-Go'" - Johnny Ross
- "Chi-City" – Common, featuring Kanye West, from Be, 2005
- "Chi-City Boogie" - Ricardo Miranda
- "Chi-Town" - Jing Chi
- "The Chi-Town Boogie" - Casey Jones
- "Chi-Town Hustler" – Eddie Floyd
- "Chi-Town Theme" – Cleveland Eaton
- "Chi-Town" – The Cribs
- "Chi-Town" – Da Brat
- "Chi-Town" – Jerry Butler
- "Chi-Town Affair" - DJ Phats
- "The Chi-Town Nightlife" – Paul Johnson
- "Chicago" – ABC
- "Chicago" – Roy Ayers
- "Chicago" – Big D and the Kids Table
- "Chicago" – Birdpaula
- "Chicago" – Bis
- "Chicago" – Capital STEEZ produced by MF Doom
- "Chicago" - Clueso
- "Chicago" - Colour Club
- "Chicago" - David Morales presents the Red Zone Project
- "Chicago" – Kiki Dee
- "Chicago" – Dynastie Crisis
- "Chicago" – The Doobie Brothers
- "Chicago" – Enuff Z'nuff
- "Chicago" – Flipturn
- "Chicago" – Frédéric François
- "Chicago" - Gabry Fasano (Italian electronic music dance producer/dj)
- "Chicago" – Gemini One
- "Chicago" – Groove Armada
- "Chicago" – Hieroglyphics
- "Chicago" – Ingram Hill
- "Chicago" (original title: "She Was Lovin' Me") – Michael Jackson
- "Chicago" – Alexz Johnson
- "Chicago – Ivan Kuchin
- "Chicago" - music by Lew Pollack; lyrics by Sidney Clare
- "Chicago" – Luther Allison
- "Chicago" – Manfred Mann's Earth Band
- "Chicago" – The Masterbuilders
- "Chicago" – Mat Kearney
- "Chicago" - O.A.R.
- "Chicago" - Otis Pierce
- "Chicago" – Ted Mulry
- "Chicago (We Can Change the World)" – Graham Nash 1971, (about the 1968 Convention)
- "Chicago" – Des O'Connor
- "Chicago" – Portugal. The Man
- "Chicago" – The Purple Hearts
- "Chicago" – Django Reinhardt
- "Chicago" – Revolutionary Ensemble
- "Chicago" – Lucy Wainwright Roche
- "Chicago" – Rodgers & Hart
- "Chicago" – Alexander Rosenbaum
- "Chicago..." – Screeching Weasel
- "Chicago" – Shawnna
- "Chicago" – Simoncino
- "Chicago" – Sufjan Stevens
- ”Chicago” - Louis Tomlinson
- "Chicago" – The Tossers
- "Chicago" – The Uglysuit
- "Chicago" – Kate Voegele
- "Chicago" – Tom Waits
- "Chicago" – Sean Watkins
- "Chicago" – Andre Williams
- "Chicago - 1926" – Nanette Workman
- "Chicago 1945" – Michael Jackson
- "Chicago 60616" – Kenny and the Kasuals
- "Chicago A"/"Chicago B" – Tirez Tirez
- "Chicago After Dark" – Chicago
- "Chicago Afterwhile" by Country Soul Revue featuring Dan Penn
- "Chicago Allstars Boogie" – Willie Dixon & The Chicago Allstars
- "Chicago at Night" – Spoon
- "Chicago Blues", 1946 – composers: Arthur Crudup, Ransom Knowling, Judge Riley
- "Chicago Blues" – Dion DiMucci
- "Chicago Blues" – Fletcher Henderson
- "Chicago Blues" – Bill Snyder
- "Chicago Blues" - Jim Peterik
- "Chicago Blues" - Oscar Peterson
- "The Chicago Blues" – Sally Roberts
- "Chicago Boogie" - Four Blazes
- "Chicago Bop Stepping" – The Clayton Brothers
- "Chicago Bound Blues", 1923 – composer & lyricist: Lovie Austin
- "Chicago Bound Blues" – Bessie Smith
- "Chicago Bound" – Canned Heat
- "Chicago Bound" – Jimmy Rogers
- "Chicago Boxcar" - Fabulous Poodles
- "Chicago Breakdown" – Gene Ammons
- "Chicago Breakdown" – Big Maceo Merriweather
- "Chicago Breakdown" – Doctor Ross
- "Chicago Bus Stop (Ooh, I Love It)" – Salsoul Orchestra
- "Chicago Buzz" – Junie Cobb
- "Chicago By Night" - Orlando Voorn
- "Chicago Calling" – Cyril Davies
- "Chicago, Chicago" – Lord Invader
- "Chicago, Chicago" - Teddy Phillips and His Orchestra featuring Colleen Lovett
- "Chicago City" – George "Harmonica" Smith
- "Chicago City" - The Monarchs
- "Chicago Concerto" - Bill Snyder
- "The Chicago Conspiracy" – David Peel
- "Chicago Cottage" – The Mirage
- "The Chicago Cyclist March", 1896 – composer: Hans Liné
- "Chicago, Damn" – Bobbi Humphrey
- "Chicago Dancin' Girls" - Curtis Potter
- "Chicago Disco" – Major Lance
- "Chicago Emerald City" – Dave Angel
- "The Chicago Express (March Two-Step)", 1905 – composer: Percy Wenrich
- "Chicago Fanphair '93" – Local H
- "Chicago Flyer" – Meade Lux Lewis
- "Chicago Fog Lift" - Chunky, Novi & Ernie (featuring Lauren Wood)
- "Chicago Function" – Sidney Bechet
- "Chicago Girl" – Roger Whittaker
- "The Chicago Girls' March or Two-Step Dance", 1895 – composer: J. W. Tate
- "Chicago, Glad To Be Back Home" - Louisiana Red
- "The Chicago Glide" – composer: Prof. Joseph Gearen
- "Chicago Green" – The Surfaris
- "Chicago Heights" - Roy Davis Jr.
- "Chicago Here I Come" – Willie Dixon & Johnny Winter
- "Chicago High Life" – Earl Hines
- "Chicago Hope" - Southampton Ltd (an alias of techno producer Thomas Schumacher)
- "The Chicago Hussar's Quickstep", 1892 – composer: A. H. Rintelman
- "The Chicago Hustle" - Evelyn Thomas
- "Chicago, Illinois" - Ben Verdery
- "Chicago, Illinois" - Bobby Short
- "Chicago, Illinois" - from the film Victor/Victoria, performed by Lesley Ann Warren, written by Leslie Bricusse and Henry Mancini
- "Chicago Institute" – Manfred Mann's Earth Band
- "Chicago Is Alive" – Dicken (of Mr Big)
- "Chicago Is Just That Way" – Eddie Boyd
- "Chicago Is Large" – Nazgul
- "Chicago Is Loaded With The Blues" - Chicago Blues Allstars/Willie Dixon
- "Chicago Is My Home" – Pierre Lacocque; sung by Lurrie Bell, from album Hattiesburg Blues; Mississippi Heat
- "Chicago Is So Two Years Ago" – Fall Out Boy from album Take This To Your Grave 2003
- "Chicago in Mind" – Albert Ammons
- "Chicago Jackmaster" - K-Alexi
- "Chicago Light Green" - Jimmy Owens (musician)
- "Chicago Line" - John Mayall
- "Chicago Man" – Eddie Shaw
- "The Chicago March", 1909 – composer: Henry S. Sawyer
- "Chicago Melody" - Axel Zwingenberger
- "Chicago Meltdown" - Impakt
- "Chicago Mess Around" - Lovie Austin's Blues Serenaders
- "Chicago, Mon Amour" – Made in Sweden
- "Chicago Monkey-Man Blues" – Rosa Henderson
- "Chicago Morning" – Chris Rea
- "Chicago My Home Town" – Barry Goldberg
- "Chicago, My Home Town" – composer & lyricist: Paul S. Hargrow
- "Chicago, New York" – The Aislers Set
- "Chicago North Western" – Juicy Lucy
- "Chicago, Now!" – The Fall
- "Chicago on My Mind" – Albert Ammons
- "Chicago on My Mind" – Jimmy Dawkins
- "Chicago Party Theme" - Jesus Wayne
- "Chicago Post March", 1896 – composer: Ellis Brooks
- "Chicago, Prairie Gem of Illinois" – composer & lyricist: Lora Aborn
- "Chicago Rhythm" - Chicago Stompers
- "Chicago River Blues" - Hayden Thompson
- "Chicago Rockets" - Bourbon Street Barons
- "Chicago Seemed Tired Last Night" – The Hold Steady
- "Chicago, Send Her Home" - Willie Hightower
- "Chicago Serenade" – Eddie Harris
- "Chicago Sidewalk" – Arthur Adams
- "Chicago Slam" - K-Alexi
- "Chicago Slide" – Victoria Spivey
- "Chicago Song" – David Sanborn
- "Chicago Southside" - CZR (house record)
- "Chicago Stomp" - Pinetop Perkins
- "Chicago Stomp Down" – Duke Ellington
- "Chicago Stomps" – Jimmy Blythe
- "The Chicago Story" - Jimmy Snyder
- "Chicago Style" - Dave Specter
- "Chicago Style" - (from Road to Bali)
- "Chicago Surf" - Surf Teens
- "Chicago (That Toddlin' Town)", 1922 – composer & lyricist: Fred Fisher; popularized by Frank Sinatra
- "Chicago, the City of Today" – composer: Bill Snyder; lyricist: Ann Marsters
- "Chicago, the Gem on the Shore", 1923 – composer & lyricist: J. A. Johnson
- "Chicago, the Most Beautiful City" – composer & lyricist: Frank Padula
- "The Chicago Theme (Love Loop)" – Hubert Laws
- "Chicago Tickle" - Harry Tierney
- "Chicago Trane Blues" - Toby Ben
- "The Chicago Tribune Centennial March", 1947 – composer: Robert Trendler; lyricist: Jack La Frandre
- "Chicago Tribune March", 1893 – composer: W. Paris Chambers
- "Chicago Trip" - The Mackenzie
- "Chicago Twist" – Werner Baumgart
- "The Chicago Two-Step" – composer: J. P. Brooks
- "Chicago Wind" – Merle Haggard
- "Chicago Woman" - The Oxfords
- "Chicago Woman" - Sonny Turner & Sound Limited
- "Chicago Women" - Willie James Lyons
- "Chicago x 12" – Rogue Wave
- "Chicago's Finest" – Emmure
- "Chicago's Gift to a 'Nation's Hero'" (U. S. Grant) 1891 – composer & lyricist: W. C. Robey
- "Chicago's Queen" – Baron Longfellow
- "Chicagoland," 2014 – Magic Man
- "Chicagoland Twirl Polka" – Frankie Yankovic
- "Christmas in Chicago" – Marilyn Scott
- "Chronically Cautious" - Braden Bales
- "Circuit Parade" - EDM
- "City in a Garden" – Fall Out Boy
- "City Lights" – Lucky Boys Confusion
- "City of CHI" – Juice
- "The City of Chicago" – Luka Bloom, Christy Moore
- "City of Promise. 1934 Century of Progress Song" – composer: Jos. Snabl-Antes; lyricist (Czech text): Vasek Niederle; lyricist (English translation): Libushka Bartusek
- "Clark Street" – Elmer Bernstein
- "Clean Up Chicago" - Josef Myrow and Mack Gordon
- "Closer to Our Graves" – Lucky Boys Confusion
- "Cold and Windy Night" – The Fantastic Four
- "Cold Chicago" – Humming House
- "Cold Chicago Wind" - Jack Bonus
- "Cold Chicago Winds" - Country Boys (featuring the Willis Brothers)
- "Cold Windy City of Chicago" – Boxcar Willie
- "Columbia Fair (Grand March)" – composer: Theodore Moelling
- "Columbian Guards March – The Musical Hit of the World's Fair", 1892 – composer & lyricist: T. P. Brooke
- "Columbus Fair (Grand March)" – composer: Geo. Schleiffarth
- "Come On! Feel the Illinoise! – Sufjan Stevens
- "Come to Chicago" – composer: Dorothy Giffey; lyricist: James Andrichen
- "Coming from Chicago' – Angelo D'Onorio
- "Conover March" (dedicated to the officials of the World's Columbian Exposition) 1893 – composer: Ion Arnold
- "Con–" – Frode Gjerstad Trio With Steve Swell
- "Control" - Unknown Brain x Rival
- "Cook County Jail" – Tom Edwards Country Four
- "The Corner" – Common, featuring Kanye West, from Be, 2005
- "The Count On Rush Street" - Shelly Manne Septet, 1951 - composer: Bill Russo
- "Crook County" – Twista, from Mobstability, 1998
- "Cubs in Five" – The Mountain Goats

== D ==
- "Daley's Gone" – Steve Goodman
- "Dancing in the Street", 1964 – Martha and the Vandellas
- "Dead End Street" – Lou Rawls
- "Dear Chicago" – Ryan Adams
- "Dearborn Street Breakdown" – Charles Avery
- "Dearie" - Gordon MacRae & Jo Stafford
- "Dennehy" – Serengeti
- "Destination - Chicago" - Commander Tom
- "Don't Call On Me" - The Monkees
- “Don’t Let Me Cave In” - The Wonder Years
- “Don’t Tell Em” - Jeremih
- "Down on Maxwell Street" - Micky Moody and Paul Williams (British singer)
- "Down On Wabash Avenue" - Josef Myrow and Mack Gordon
- "Downtown Chicago" - Tangerine Dream
- "Dr. Chicago" – Udo Lindenberg
- "A Dying Cubs Fan's Last Request" – Steve Goodman

== E ==
- "East Chicago Blues" – Sparks Brothers
- "East Wacker Drive" – Phil Barry
- “End Of Beginning” - Djo
- "End Of Chicago" - Shock Stars
- "An Esthete On Clark Street" – William Russo
- "Everything" – Dawn Xiana Moon
- "The Eggplant That Ate Chicago", 1967 – Dr. West's Medicine Show and Junk Band
- "The EL" – Rhett Miller
- "El-A-Noy" by Billy Corgan 2004
- "The Elements: Fire", recorded 1966, released 2011 – Brian Wilson
- "Epitaph Of A Small Winner" by Archie Shepp & Chicago Beau
- "Epidemic", 2020 - Polo G from Hall of Fame, drill
- "Everything is Big in Chicago" by Gustave Kerker and Frederic Ranken

== F ==
- "Fair Women of Chicago Waltzes", 1893 – composer: Theo. H. Northrup
- "Far, Far Away" – Wilco
- "Ferris Wheel March", 1893 – composer: Geo. Maywood
- "Ferris Wheel Waltz", 1893 – composer: G. Valisi; lyricist: Harry C. Clyde
- "First Steps", 1993 – composer: Tommy Stinson, from Bash & Pop
- "Food from Chicago" – Lord Christo
- "The Forest of Love and Romance, Theme song of the Black Forest Village, A Century of Progress Chicago", 1933 – composer: Ernie Kratzinger; lyricist: Charles Kallen
- "Forty-Seventh and State" – Bud Freeman
- "From Chicago to the Sky" – Seventh Avenue
- "From Chicago with Love" – Harlan Howard
- "From London to Chicago" - Wild Bob Burgos (from Matchbox (band)) & The Dreadnoughts
- "Full Moon" – Armand Van Helden ft. Common
- "Funeral March in Memoriam, Carter H. Harrison, Mayor of Chicago", 1893, composer: W. Herbert Layon
- "Funk, Chicago Style" - Dick Hyman

== G ==
- "The Girl from Chicago" – Benny Bell
- "Ghost of Chicago" – Noah Floersch
- "Git On Up" – Fast Eddie and Sundance
- "Go Cubs Go" – Steve Goodman
- "Go Go Chicago. Wonder City Home of Mine." – composer & lyricist: Clitus M. Wickens
- "Go Go Gadget Flow" – Lupe Fiasco, from Lupe Fiasco's The Cool, 2007
- "Goin' Back to Chicago" – Chet Oliver
- "Goin' Back to Chicago" – Smokey Hogg
- "Goin' to Chicago Blues", 1939 – composer: Count Basie Orchestra, Lou Rawls
- "Goin' to Chicago" – traditional; recorded by Mike Westbrook
- "Golden Ring" – Tammy Wynette & George Jones
- "Gone To Chicago" - The Pied Pipers
- "Goodbye to Guyville" – Urge Overkill
- "Goodnight Chicago" – Rainbow Kitten Surprise
- "Got To Leave Chi-Town" - Chicago Blues A Living History
- "Grand Exposition March" – composer: Louis Falk
- "Grand Terrace Ballroom" - Albert Nicholas, Herb Flemming, Nelson Williams, Benny Waters, Joe Turner (jazz pianist)
- "Grand Terrace Rhythm" – Bob Crosby
- "Great Big Friendly Town Chicago" – Dora Hall
- "Greater Chicago March" – composer: Jacob Valentine Havener; lyricist: Agner Clark Winkler
- "Green Mill Garden Blues", 1920 – composer: unknown (88 key piano roll)
- "Greetings. Chicago's Official Song. 1833–Chicago–1933" – composer & lyricist: George D. Gaw; transcriber & arranger: Frank Barden
- "Growing Up" – Fall Out Boy, from Fall Out Boy's Evening Out with Your Girlfriend, 2003
- "A Guided Tour of Chicago" – The Lawrence Arms, 1999

== H ==
- "Hail Chicago (March)", 1933 – composer: Stanley Kay; lyricist: A. Seaborg
- "Hail to Thee, Chicago" – composer: John E. King; lyricist: Estella A. Johnson-Hunt
- "Hail, Chicago, Hail", 1949 – composer and lyricist: Lesley Kirk
- "Hail, Chicago! Official Song of the Pageant of Progress", 1921 – composer: Bob Allen; lyricist: Ted Turnquist
- "Hands Open"– Snow Patrol
- "Happy Summertime" – R. Kelly, featuring Snoop Dogg, from TP.3 Reloaded, 2005
- "Harlem Avenue" by Red Callender
- "Hastings Street" – Blind Blake
- "The Hat He Never Ate" – composer: Ben Harney; lyricist: Howard S. Taylor
- "Hello Chicago Fox-Trot", 1933 – composer: Anthony Misuraca; lyricist: Joseph Argento
- "Hello Chicago" – Topher Jones & Amada, featuring Ido vs. The World
- "Hello Chicago" by Sun Kil Moon
- "Highway 55" – The O'Kanes
- "Hitch Hike" – The Rolling Stones, from Out Of Our Heads, 1965; originally by Marvin Gaye
- "Home" – Kanye West
- "Home In Chicago" - Dave Riley And Bob Corritore
- "Homecoming" – Kanye West, featuring Chris Martin from Graduation, 2008 (charted at #9 on UK Singles, music video features the bean sculpture in Millennium Park)
- "Homesick at Spacecamp" – Fall Out Boy from Take This To Your Grave, 2003
- "Hometown Chicago" - John Parricelli And Stan Sulzmann

== I ==
- "I-94" - Jules Blattner
- "(I've Got the) Old Chicago Blues" – Bob Gentile
- "I Am Proud of Chicago" – composer & lyricist: Ben Schwartzberg
- "I Came Home" – Rhymefest
- "I Dream of Chicago" – Parlours
- "I Got a Mind to Go to Chicago" – Jackie Payne Steve Edmonson Band
- "I Got the Chicago Blues" – Jim Peterik
- “I Hate Chicago” - Laura Jane Grace
- "I Left My Mind In Chicago" - Abu Talib (musician)
- "I Love Chicago" - Little Mike and the Tornadoes
- "I Might Need Security" – Chance The Rapper
- "I Murdered Them In Chicago' - from Glad To See You
- "I Smell Chicago" by Catfish Hodge
- "I Used to Work in Chicago. I Did But I Don't Anymore", 1944 – composers & lyricists: Larry Vincent & Sunny Skylar
- "(I Want To Go To) Chicago" - R.T. & The Rockmen Unlimited
- "I Was Having A Hard Time In Chicago" - Mike Martin
- "I–94" – Jules Blattner
- "I'll Meet You in Chicago (at the Fair)", 1928 – composers & lyricists: Charlie Harrison & Fred Rose
- "I'm a Ramblin' Man" – Waylon Jennings
- "I'm Dying Tomorrow" – Alkaline Trio
- "I'm from Chicago", 1917 – composer: Leo Edwards; lyricist: Blanche Merrill
- "I'm Going Right Back to Chicago" (Coon Song) 1906 – composer: Egbert Van Alstyne; lyricist: Harry Williams
- "I'm Strong for Chicago" (University of Chicago Songbook) composer unknown, https://www.youtube.com/watch?v=Jfb8Q-569q8
- "I've Got All This Ringing in My Ears and None on My Fingers" – Fall Out Boy, from Infinity on High, 2007
- "I've Got To Leave Chi-Town" - Carey Bell & Lurrie Bell
- "In 1933 (Where Will You Be)" – composer & lyricist: Art Kassel; arranger: Charles Adams
- "In Cairo Street: A Characteristic Fantasie for Piano", 1893 – composer: Geo. Schleiffarth
- "In Chicago" – composer & lyricist: Olive Jeane
- "In Old Chicago", 1937 – composers & lyricists: Mack Gordon & Harry Revel
- "In Tha Chi" – Shawnna, featuring Syleena Johnson, from Block Music, 2006
- "In the Ghetto"– Elvis Presley (International number one pop song in 1969)
- "In the Kitchen – Umphrey's McGee from Anchor Drops, 2004, progressive rock
- "Inner Circles of Chicago" – Rodger Wilhoit
- "Into the Chicago Abyss" – Southall Riot
- "Is Chicago, Is Not Chicago" – Soul Coughing
- "It's a Cold Winter" – Frankie Knuckles, Chicago house
- "It's a Way They Have in Chicago" (from Sinbad) 1896 – composer: Gustav Lüders; lyricist: M.E. Rourke
- "It's a Way They Have in Chicago" (from the Royal Chef) 1904 – composer: Ben M. Jerome; lyricists: Geo. E. Stoddard & Chas. S. Taylor

== J ==
- "Jackson Park El Train" by Harold Mabern Trio
- "Jackson Park Express" – "Weird Al" Yankovic
- "Jazz Music" – Gang Starr (a different song to the group's more famous "Jazz Thing")
- "Jazz Thing" – Gang Starr
- "Jesus Just Left Chicago" – ZZ Top
- "Joe Chicago" – Big Walter Horton
- "Joe Murphy's Farewell To Chicago" – Old Rope String Band
- "Jolly Bears, To Those on the Board of Trade of Chicago. Polka Humoristic", 1880 – composer: Geo. Schleiffarth
- "Jumpin' in the Pump Room" - John Kirby (musician) and his Orchestra
- "Just Blew in from the Windy City" – Doris Day, 1953
- "Just for Money" – Paul Hardcastle

== K ==
- "Keys to the City" – Ministry & Co Conspirators, 2008

== L ==
- "Let's Go, Go-Go White Sox" – Walter Jagiello
- "L.A., Goodbye" – The Ides of March
- "Lady From Chicago" - Neal Sharpe
- "Lake Effect Kid" (demo song) – Fall Out Boy, from Welcome to the New Administration, 2008
- "Lake Michigan" – Rogue Wave, 2007
- "Lake Shore Drive" – Aliotta Haynes Jeremiah, 1971
- "Lake Shore Drive" – Art Porter Jr.
- "Lake Shore Drive" – E-Smoove (Eric Miller)
- "Lake Shore Drive" – Gerald Wilson Orchestra
- "Lake Shore Drive" – The Innocence Mission
- "Lake Shore Drive" – Theo Parrish
- "Lake Shore Drive Boogie" – Lefty Dizz
- "Lake Shore Drive (Chicago Concerto)" - 101 Strings
- "Lake Shore Drive (Slight Return)" – Harris Newman
- "Lake Shore Driving" – Duran Duran 1988
- "Lakefront Blues" - Dan Burley And His Skiffle Boys
- "Lakeshore Cowboy" – Ramsey Lewis
- "The Last Day of the Fair", 1893 – composer: Frank Swain
- "Lawndale Blues" - Eddie Taylor Blues Band
- "LAX to O'Hare" – The Academy Is...
- "Leader of the Band" – Dan Fogelberg (from Peoria)
- "Leavin' Chicago, A.M.F." – Aliotta Haynes Jeremiah
- "Leaving Chicago" – Knockout
- "Lido Shuffle" – Boz Scaggs
- "Lincoln Park Pirates" – Steve Goodman
- "Little Joe from Chicago", 1930 – composers: Mary Lou Williams, Henry Wells
- "Living in Chicago" – The Bee Gees
- "Lobster And Scrimp" - Timbaland featuring Jay-Z
- "Logan Square" - – Jimmy McPartland And Art Hodes
- "London House" – Billy Walker
- "Long Line To Chicago" - Larry Hosford
- "Lovin's Been Here and Gone to Mecca Flats", 1926 – composer: Jimmy Blythe
- "LSD" - Jamila Woods ft. Chance the Rapper
- "Luther" - Kendrick Lamar and SZA

== M ==
- "Mama Chicago" – Bonnie Koloc
- "Mama Chicago" – Mike Westbrook
- "The Man from the South with a Big Cigar in his Mouth", 1930 – composers & lyricists: Rube Bloom & Harry M. Woods
- "The March Maroon, University of Chicago March and Two-Step", 1906 – composer: Harry Turner
- "Marching on to Chicago", 1933 – composers & lyricists: Richard Daly, Thomas Parmiter & Clitus Wickens
- "Maxwell Street" – Chris Rea
- "Maxwell Street Boogie" - Rob Hoeke
- "Maxwell Street Shuffle" – Barry Goldberg
- "Mean Old Chicago" - Bob Margolin
- "Mecca Flat Blues", 1924 – composer: Jimmy Blythe; lyricists: Jimmy Blythe & Priscilla Stewart
- "Meet Me in Chicago" – Jimmy McPartland And Art Hodes
- "Meet Me in Chicago" – Mat Kearney, Buddy Guy from Rhythm & Blues
- "Memphis-Chicago Blues" – Julio Finn Band (featuring Memphis Slim)
- "Mercy Me" – Alkaline Trio
- "Miss Chicago (The Great 'Pageant' Song)", 1921 – composer: Edmund Braham; lyricist: W.S. Greelish
- "Mrs. O'Leary's Cow" – Brian Wilson
- "Muddy Waters (Little Walter/Lakeshore Theme/Willie D./Otis/Whisper From Theresa's/Walkin' Up Halsted)" – Glen Hall & Gil Evans
- "Must Have Been The Wind" - Alec Benjamin
- "My Kind of Town" – Frank Sinatra, 1964 (nominated for the 1964 Academy Award for Best Original Song)

== N ==
- "New West Side Stroll" - Dave Specter
- "New York/Chicago" - Mark Imperial
- "New York and Chicago" - music by Albert Von Tilzer; lyrics by Junie McCree
- "New York - London - Paris - Chicago" - Soup
- "New York To Chicago" - Chubby Jackson
- "The Night Chicago Died" – Paper Lace (Billboard Hot 100 #1 hit in 1974)
- "Night In Chicago" - Reeds
- "North to Chicago" – Hank Snow
- "Northwest 222" – Harry Chapin
- "Nothing Beats Chicago/Ocean is Different" – from the musical Marie Christine

== O ==
- "Ode for the opening of the World's Fair. Held at Chicago, 1892" – composer: C. W. Chadwick; lyricist: Harriet Monroe
- "Oh City of a Century" – composer: Eleanor Everest Freer
- "Oh, Yes! Oh, Yes! Oh, Yes! Oh, Yes! The Dancing Girls will give a Show before they Start for Chicago!" from Little Christopher Columbus
- "Oh You Chicago, Oh You New York", 1910 – composer: Albert Von Tilzer; lyricists: Junie McCree & Sydney Rosenfeld
- "The Oldest Living Groupie in Chicago" – Doug Ashdown
- "On a Freezing Chicago Street" – Margot and the Nuclear So and So's
- "On the Midway, or the Jolly Bum, Bum", 1893 – composer & lyricist: Louis Ortenstein
- "On the South Side of Chicago" – Vic Damone, Freddy Cole
- "One Way Ride (To Chicago)" – Lois Johnson
- "Only in Chicago" – Barry Manilow
- "The Original Chicago Blues", 1915 – composer: James White
- "The Osmosis Suite - Chicago Indian" - System 7 (band)
- "Our Chicago" (U of C), 1926 – composer & lyricist: Norman Reid

== P ==
- "Palmah House Shuffle" (Palmer House Hotel), 1903 – composer: Libbie Erickson
- "Pantin' in the Panther Room" – Fats Waller
- "The Payback" - James Brown
- "Peace Frog" – The Doors
- "Picketlines and Pepperspray" – Silent Film
- "Polka Lounges In Chicago" - Eddie Blazonczyk & The Versatones
- "Prairie Song" – Billy Corgan
- "Private Lawns" – Angus & Julia Stone
- "Pulaski at Night" – Andrew Bird
- "Pulaski Day" – Kidd Russell
- "Pump Room" - The Friendly Indians
- "Pump That Body" - Mr. Lee
- "Pump Up Chicago" – Mr. Lee
- "Put the Blame on Mame", 1946 – composers & lyricists: Allan Roberts, Doris Fisher

== R ==
- "Randolph Street Rag" - Chicago Rhythm Kings
- "Real Good Girlfriend" – The Mountain Goats
- "Red Hot Chicago" – Flying High, 1930; composers & lyricists: B.G. DeSylva, Lew Brown & Ray Henderson
- "Red Leaves of October" – Michael Peter Smith
- "Relax With Chicago" - K-Alexi
- “Reminding Me (of Sef) - Common (rapper)
- "Richmond, Chicago, Mexico And Home" - Sonny Miller And The Happy Valley Boys
- "Ride My Face to Chicago" – Frank Zappa
- "Ride To Stony Island" - Stony Island Band (from Stony Island (film))
- "Rock-Skippin' at the Blue Note" – Duke Ellington
- "Royal Garden Blues" (jazz standard)
- "Route 90" - Clarence Garlow
- "The Runaway Train" - Michael Holliday

== S ==
- "San Francisco" – Alkaline Trio
- "Saying Goodbye" – Every Avenue
- "The Seer's Tower" – Sufjan Stevens
- "She Called It" - Saba & No I.D.
- "She Shook Him in Chicago" – (Madame Sherry 1909) – composer: Karl L. Hoschna; lyricist: Otto Hauerbach
- "She Was Hot" – Rolling Stones
- "She Was in Chicago" – John Lee Hooker
- "She'd Never Leave Chicago" – McKendree Spring
- "The Sheik of Chicago (Mustafa)", 1960 – adaptor & lyricist: Bob Merrill; recorded by the Four Lads and Archie Bleyer
- "The (Shipped) Gold Standard" – Fall Out Boy from Folie a Deux, 2008
- "Showtime in Chicago" – Joe Jackson
- "Shy-Town" – Gorillaz
- "Sidewalks of Chicago" – Merle Haggard
- "Silent Night/7 O' Clock News" – Simon & Garfunkel
- "Silver City" – Hey Champ
- "Slow Down Chicago" – Canasta
- "Snakeheads" – The Mountain Goats
- "So Long Toots" – Cherry Poppin' Daddies from Soul Caddy
- "Something from Nothing" – Foo Fighters, 2014
- "Somewhere in Chicago" – Arnold McCuller
- "Somewhere on Fullerton" – Allister
- "Sounds at the Archway" – Eddie Harris
- "Sounds of West Side Chicago" – Jimmy Dawkins & Hip Linkchain
- "South Shore Drive" - Bernard Allison
- "South Shore Drive" - Noble "Thin Man" Watts
- "South Side" – Moby, featuring Gwen Stefani, 2001 (#14 on Billboard Hot 100)
- "South Side Irish" – Arranmore
- "South Side of Chicago" – Eddie Burns
- "South Side Shake" - Dan Burley And His Skiffle Boys
- "South Union" – Lucky Boys Confusion
- "Southbound Ryan" – Dennis DeYoung
- "Southside Boogie" - Dick Hyman
- "Southside Boogie" - James Cotton
- "Southside Chicago Waltz" – Black 47
- "Southside Chicago" – Otis Brown & The Delights
- "Southside Hop" - Left Hand Frank
- "Southside Mojo" – JaGoFF
- "Southside Shuffle" – Art Hodes
- "Southside Stomp" - Ronnie Earl & the Broadcasters
- "Southside Stuff" – Jimmy Yancey
- "South Side To Riverside" - Lurrie Bell
- "Southside" – Common, featuring Kanye West, from Finding Forever, 2007
- "Star Witness" – Neko Case
- "Startin' for Chicago" – Tracy Nelson
- "State Street Blues" – Synco Jazz Band (featuring Joseph Samuels)
- "State Street Jive" – Cow Cow Davenport
- "State Street" - Peter Gallway
- "State Street" – Sonny Knight
- "State Street" – Sun Ra
- "State Street Samba" – Cook County
- "State Street Special" - Johnny Parker (jazz pianist)
- "State Street Sweet" - Gerald Wilson Orchestra
- "State Street Tomorrow – Theme Song", 1930 – composers: Carelton Colby & Maurice Wetzel from the Radio Station KYW staff
- "Stay Chi" – Juice
- "Stell–" – Frode Gjerstad Trio With Steve Swell
- "Stockyard Blues" - Floyd Jones
- "Stockyard Strut" - Freddie Keppard
- "Stony Island Band" - Stony Island Band (from Stony Island (film))
- "Stratford-on-Guy" – Liz Phair, 1993
- "Streamline Train" - The Vipers Skiffle Group
- "Strings Of Chicago" - Lidell Townsell
- "Stuck in Chicago" – Cate Brothers
- "Sunshine in Chicago" – Sun Kil Moon
- "Survivor's Guilt" - Saba featuring G Herbo
- "Super Bowl Shuffle" – Chicago Bears Shufflin' Crew, the 1985 Chicago Bears champions
- "Super Fade" - Fall Out Boy from "Lake Effect Kid EP", 2018
- "Sweet Chicago" – The Original Caste
- "Sweet Home Chicago", 1937 – composer: Robert Johnson; lyricists: Robert Johnson & Roosevelt Sykes, Blues Brothers
- "Sweet Spots" – The Fiery Furnaces
- "Swing Life Away" – Rise Against from Siren Song of the Counter Culture, 2005
- "Switchboard" – Kid Sister

== T ==
- "Take Me Back to Chicago", 1985 – title track on Take Me Back to Chicago by Chicago
- "Take the Time", 1993 – Waiting for the Night by the Freddy Jones Band
- "Talkin' Baseball (Baseball And The Cubs)" – Terry Cashman
- "Taste of Chicago" – Albert Washington
- "Thank You Chicago" - Ricardo Miranda
- "That's That", 2006 – Snoop Dogg featuring R. Kelly (#3 on Hot Rap Songs chart)
- "There's No Lights On The Christmas Tree Mother They're Burning Big Louis Tonight" – Alex Harvey
- "This City", 2011 – Patrick Stump featuring Lupe Fiasco from Soul Punk
- "The Humbling River" - Puscifer
- "Ticket to Chicago" – Terry Garthwaite (once of Joy of Cooking)
- "To Chicago With Love" – Lois Johnson
- "Together Forever (Krush Groove 4)" – Run-DMC
- "Tonight, Tonight", 1996 – The Smashing Pumpkins (#4 on Mainstream Rock chart)
- "Tonight Will Last Forever", 2005 – Photographs by Mest
- "The Torture Doctor", 2013 – Alkaline Trio
- "Train to Chicago" – Mike Doughty
- "The Trianon March", 1934 – dedicated to the Chicago Association of Dancing Masters; composer: R. Alexander Campbell
- "True Blue," 2023 – boygenius
- "True Enough", 2009 – Everything's Easy by Girlyman
- "Turn It Up Again" – Conway Brothers
- "Twilight Serenade", 2005 – Another Ghost by Jason Myles Goss
- "Two Words", 2004 – Kanye West featuring Mos Def, Freeway, and the Boys Choir of Harlem, from The College Dropout

== U ==
- "The University Quickstep", 1865 – inscribed to the President and Friends of the Chicago University; composer: E. M. Shaw
- "Underneath the Streetlights of Chicago", 2019; Riley Smith

== V ==
- "Vacation in Chicago" – Cold War Kids
- "Vernon Park" - Lil' Mark
- "Via Chicago", 1999 – Summerteeth by Wilco
- "The Viking March – Captain Andersen's Viking Ship from Norway to the World's Fair", 1893 – composer: H. C. Verner

== W ==
- "Wacker Drive" – Wazmo Nariz
- "Wailin' at the Trianon" – Lionel Hampton
- "We Ride", 1998 – R. by R. Kelly, featuring Jay-Z
- "We're All Crazy in Chicago", 1986 – Jonathon Brandmeier
- "We're Gonna Go to Chicago" – from the musical Marie Christine
- "Welcome 2 Chicago", 2001 – Abstract Mindstate featuring Kanye West
- "Welcome to Chicago" - Gene Farris (British chart hit in 2003)
- "Welcome to Chicago" – Kill Hannah from Wake Up the Sleepers, 2009
- "Wes Cide Bluze" – Jimmy Dawkins
- "Wes Cide Rock" – Jimmy Dawkins
- "West Side Baby" - Fenton Robinson
- "West Side Bossman" - Otis Grand, Anson Funderburgh, Debbie Davies
- "Westside Bound" - Saba featuring Benjamin Earl Turner
- "Westside Bound Pt. 2" - Saba
- "Westside Bound 3" - Saba featuring Joseph Chilliams
- "Westside Bound Pt. 4" - Saba featuring MFnMelo
- "West Side Shuffle" – Ronnie Earl & Duke Robillard
- "West Side Woman" - Lurrie Bell
- "Weston's March to Chicago", 1867 – composer: Edward Mack; publisher: S. Brainard & Sons, Cleveland
- "Wheels a-Rolling", 1948 – official song of the Chicago Railroad Fair; composer: Helen Purcell Maxwell; lyricist: Philip Maxwell
- "When the Levee Breaks", 1929 – composers & lyricists: Kansas Joe McCoy and Memphis Minnie; re-worked by Led Zeppelin in 1971
- "When the Wind Blows in Chicago" – writers: Scott Turner, Audie Murphy; performed by both Roy Clark and Bobby Bare in 1964, and Eddy Arnold in 1970
- "When You Meet a Man in Chicago" – from Sugar
- “Wilder Days” - Morgan Wade
- "White Sox Stomp" – Jimmy Yancey
- "Why" - Willow
- "Windy City Blues" - Ernie Hawks And The Soul Investigators
- "Windy City Blues" – Mike Westbrook
- "Windy City Boogie Woogie", c. 1941–1943 – Nat King Cole
- "Windy City Boogie", c. 1950–1954 – J. T. Brown
- "Windy City Hop" – Slim Gaillard
- "Windy City Soul" by Jerry Butler
- "Windy City" – Jack-Tronic
- "Windy City" – Jackie McLean
- "Windy City" – Phish
- "Windy City" - Richard Evans
- "Windy City" – Rodney Franklin
- "Windy City" – The Sweet
- "Windy City" – from Windy City
- "Windy City Blues" - Ernie Hawks & The Soul Investigators
- "Windy City Stomp" - Rob Hoeke
- "Wine-O From Chicago" - Howard Crockett
- "Winter in Chicago", 2012 – Toil by Flatfoot 56
- "The Woman Downstairs", 1998 – Through the Trees by The Handsome Family
- "Woman in Chicago" – Jim Post
- "World's Columbian Exposition Waltz", 1893 – composer: Adelaide Marcelia Gluck
- "The World's Fair or A Voyage to Chicago", 1893 – composer & lyricist: Leonard Gautier

== Y ==
- "Yes Chicago Is... (Suite)" - Gerald Wilson Orchestra
- "You Haven't Seen The U.S.A. Until You've Seen Chicago!" - Dick Marx Orchestra
- "You Wake Up in the Morning in Chicago", 1915 – composer: Harry Carroll; lyricists: Ballard MacDonald and Coleman Goetz
- "You'll Find 'Em in Chicago" (from The Yankee Regent), 1905 – composer: Ben M. Jerome; lyricists: Chas S. Adelman and I. L. Blumenstock
- "You're Dead", 2001 – From Here to Infirmary by Alkaline Trio
- "Your the Inspiration", 1984 - Chicago 17

== Z ==
- "Zelda", 2007 – Isn't This Supposed to Be Fun!? by Farewell

== Songs about Chicago sport teams ==
- "All the Way", 2008 – Eddie Vedder
- "Bear Down Chicago Bears", 1941 – composer & lyricist: Jerry Downs
- "Chelsea Dagger", with text modified by Blackhawks' fans, 2006 – composer and lyricist: Jon Fratelli; performers: The Fratellis
- "The Chicago Cubs Song – Hey Hey! Holy Mackerel!", 1969 – composer: John Frigo; lyricist: I. C. Haag
- "Come On You Cubs Play Ball", 1937 – composer & lyricist: Bernard "Whitey" Berquist
- "Cubs on Parade (The Great March and Two-Step)", 1907 – composer: H. R. Hempel; arranger: Jos. Techen
- "The Glory of the Cubs", 1908 – composer: Arthur Marshall; lyricist: F. R. Sweirngen
- "Go Cubs Go", 1984 – composer & lyricist: Steve Goodman
- "Here Come the Hawks", 1968 – composer: J. Swayzee; producer: The Dick Marx Orchestra and Choir
- "Hurrah for the Cubs", 1930 – composer: Burrell Van Buren; lyricist: Betty Douglas
- "Let's Go, Go-Go White Sox", 1959 – composer & lyricists: Captain Stubby and the Buccaneers
- "Super Bowl Shuffle", 1985 – composers: B. Daniels, L. Barry; lyricists: R. Meyer, M. Owens; performers: Chicago Bears Shufflin' Crew, the 1985 Chicago Bears
- "Watch the Cubs Play Ball", 1941 – composer & lyricist: Harry A. Magill
- "Wave the Flag (For Old Chicago)", 1929 – fight song of the University of Chicago; lyricist: Gordon Erickson
- "We're The Cubbies", 2012 – composer, lyricist, and audio engineer: Michael Droste CubsSong.com
- "White Sox Fitted", 2010 – composer & lyricist: Young General
- "The White Sox March", 1907 – composer: T. F. Durand
