= Canasta (disambiguation) =

Canasta, Spanish for basket, is a card game of the rummy family.

Canasta may also refer to:

- Canasta (band), a Chicago-based chamber pop sextet
- Canasta uruguaya, a 1951 Mexican film
- Chan Canasta, a professional magician
- Nasty Canasta, a character in the Merrie Melodies and Looney Tunes cartoons
- Nasty Canasta (burlesque), a New York City-based neo-burlesque performer
- Queso canasta, Mexican cheese
- Tacos de canasta, Mexican street taco
