= Skipper Wise =

- Born: Bernard Louis Wise; March 6, 1957 (age 69)
- Genres: Jazz fusion, smooth jazz, pop, alternative rock
- Occupations: Musician, songwriter, entrepreneur
- Instruments: Bass, fretless bass, acoustic guitar, piano, electric guitar
- Labels: ITI/Allegiance Records, Intima/Capitol Records, Cypress/A&M Records, Cypress/Gold Mountain Records, Innovative Communications Records, Higher Octave/Virgin Records, JVC America Records
- Website: SkipperWise.com , Blue Microphones

Bernard Louis "Skipper" Wise (born March 6, 1957) is an American singer, songwriter, musician, and entrepreneur born in Los Angeles.

In 1983, he fronted the contemporary jazz group, Windows, which delivered four top 10 radio records punctuated by the album, "The French Laundry," which reached number one on the radio charts. Wise's solo debut onto the music scene came with the 1989 Top 30 Single, "Standing Outside in the Rain" on the European pop charts. Partnering with producer Les Pierce in 1994, Colour Club was born, delivering three albums from JVC America, with the self-titled album reaching number seven on the radio charts. Several videos and singles in the US and Japan helped establish Colour Club as a pioneer in the acid jazz movement of the 1990s. Best known for his music recording career, Wise is also the co-founder of Blue Microphones, the audio manufacturer. In 1999, Skipper left the music industry to dedicate his time and passion full-time to Blue Microphones.

== Life and career ==
=== Early years ===
Wise was born in Los Angeles in 1957. He first experienced music through piano lessons given by his mother and grandmother. As a teenager, he began taking guitar lessons, learning folk music and the art of finger picking. He later picked up the bass, finding that it was easier to get into bands as a bass player. Teaming up with high school friend, Ed Cohen, Skipper formed a contemporary jazz group, Windows, which released 11 albums from the 1980s through the early 1990s.

=== 1982 Wink ===
Wink, a band led by Skipper Wise (bass, lead and backing vocals), and including David Nielsen (guitars, lead and backing vocals), Ed Cohen (keyboards, backing vocals, lead vocals), Craig Mesco (drums, percussion, backing vocals), and special guest Michael Acosta (saxophone). The 11-song album was produced by Skipper Wise and Wink, and arranged by Wink. The Joan Miroesque cover was done by Jeff Gold. The songs were published by F.F. Publishing 1982.

=== 1983–1988 Windows ===
Windows, an instrumental contemporary jazz group signed with ITI Records in 1983 and included Skipper (Bassist), Ed Cohen (keyboard), Dudley Brooks (guitar), Tim Timmermans (drums) and Michael Acosta (saxophone). Windows, the self-titled album was released in 1983 on ITI Records and received positive reviews that allowed the group to play locally and create a small following. This local buzz attracted Jim Martone of the new-formed Jazz label Intima/Enigma. Windows was signed in 1984 to Intima/Capitol Records and their second album "Is It Safe" was released soon after.

In the summer of 1987, Windows released third album Mr. Bongo and it charted Number Three on the new R&R radio format charts now called N.A.C (New Adult Contemporary).

In 1989, signed to a new recording contract at A&M/Cypress records, Windows released The French Laundry, the first album to feature Skipper and, guest vocalist Al Stewart, on vocals on the title track. The album immediately went to Number One on the radio charts and stayed there for six weeks.

In 1990, a new Windows album Blue September was released on Cypress/Gold Mountain records. The album peaked at Number Three on the radio charts. This album included Al Stewart, Janis Ian and Skipper singing the three vocal tracks.

In 1992 Ed Cohen left Windows. Skipper reorganized an entirely new Windows lineup which released the Album From the Asylum on Blue Orchid/DA Music. The album reached number 14 on the radio charts.

The seventh Windows record My Red Jacket released in 1993.

Live Laundry was released in late 1994. It was composed of live performances of songs from the French Laundry record and unreleased material from that period.

The ninth Windows album Apples and Oranges was released in 1995 on Blue Orchid/DA Music.

The First Three Years a double CD, released in 1994, included the best of the first two Window's albums and Mr. Bongo in its entirety.

In 1996, Skipper, along with Les Pierce (of Colour Club), released the eleventh and final Windows album, A Funky Distinction.

=== 1987–1994 solo and production projects ===
In 1987, Tim Timmermans and Skipper went into the studio—separate from Windows— to record Poem of the Five Mountains. The album was released on the label Innovative Communications only on vinyl and was later released in 1989 on Higher Octave Music as a CD with a different last track. The track "In a Ten Bamboo Studio" from the album was included on the nationally released "Wave Aid" CD in 1988.

In late 1987, Skipper produced and contributed writing to the album Vibrate from the Spencer Davis Group released in Spain.

In 1989, Cypress/A&M offered Skipper a solo record deal. Peter White, agreed to produce the record with Skipper, and eight weeks later in late 1989, The Clock and the Moon was released.

From Skipper's first solo album The Clock and the Moon, the single "Standing Outside in the Rain" (co-written with Peter White) was picked up by KTWV-The Wave in Los Angeles, who at the time played almost no vocal material. The airtime resulted in the song being picked up by adult contemporary (AC) radio stations around the country. "Standing Outside in the Rain" began to climb the European pop charts, eventually peaking out at number three.

In 1990, Skipper co-produced Peter White's first album titled "Réveillez-Vous." Upon its release, the album reached Number One on the NAC radio charts and Skipper sang the lone vocal track "Play Your Guitar For Me."

Free of his obligations with Cypress Records in 1992, Skipper began working with Peter recording new material for his second solo album to be called, "Harry." One of the early sessions yielded the song, "I Want to Be With You," written with Peter White and released as a single on the Crisis record label in Europe.

In 1999, Sjaak De Bruijn, the head of A&R for Gold Circle Entertainment in Europe, released, "Walking on a Wire" which included song selections from, "The Clock and the Moon," along with songs from the unreleased, "Harry" album.

=== 1994–1997 Colour Club ===
In 1994, Skipper was introduced to Les Pierce who had a Top 40 hit at the time with the pop group "Louie Louie" and was producing the vocal group, Take 6. Skipper was signed to JVC Records for a three album deal along with Les Pierce as the group, Colour Club.

Colour Club, the self-titled album was released on the JVC label in early 1994 and reached number 5 on the NAC radio charts. The album was branded as the new movement in Europe called, "Acid Jazz."

The video for the single, "Freedom Words" was shot in Zuma Beach, Malibu in Southern Calif and produced by Mitchel Linden. The results yielded a video of the year nominations from The American Billboards Video awards.

The album, "In the Flow" was released in 1996 on the JVC/VERTEX label. Now with a permanent singer Lisa Taylor, the album yielded three singles: "Be Yourself" which charted in the top 40 in Japan; "If it's all Good" and "Pearls."

The third and final Colour Club record, "Sexuality," was released in 1997 on JVC/Vertex and the single "Tenderness" was issued.

=== 1999–Present Blue Microphones and NEAT Microphones ===
In the 1980s, Skipper met Martins Saulespurens in Europe while promoting "Standing Outside in the Rain." Martins, an electronics engineer, was able to fix the vintage European microphones necessary for Skipper to capture the audiophile sound of Jazz records required under his contracts. Eventually the pair started to create their own products and launched Blue Microphones in 1995.

In 2008, Skipper and Martins sold Blue Microphones to Transom Capital, a private Equity firm from Southern California. Skipper and Martins both retained an interest in the company.

In 2010, Blue was named as one of the fastest-growing companies by Inc. Magazine and included in The Deloitte Technology Fast 500. In 2011 they were recognized by the CEA Innovations Award, Los Angeles Business Journal 50 Fastest Growing Private Companies, San Fernando Valley Business Journal's Manufacturing Leadership award and Retail Vision Award. In mid 2013 Blue Microphones was sold to the private equity company "The Riverside Company" with Skipper and Martins departing.

In 2014, Gibson Brands launched the NEAT Microphones Division, and named Wise president. The following year, NEAT Microphones released a line of bee-themed microphones including the Beecaster, Bumblebee, King Bee, and Worker Bee. In 2017, Stray Electrons was formed between the founding team of Blue and Neat Microphones which later purchased the assets of Neat from Gibson in 2018. After an independent relaunch (and a successful two year run), gaming tech and accessories brand Turtle Beach acquired the Neat Brand in January 2021.

== Discography ==
=== Solo releases ===
Albums

| Year | Album details | Peak chart positions |
|---|---|---|
| 1989 | The Clock and the Moon: Label/Catalog No.: Cypress/A&M #YD0129; Format: vinyl | NAC (R&R): No. 7 |
| 1999 | Walking on a Wire: Label/Catalog No.: Gold Circle Entertainment | |
| 2017 | This Is Life: Label/Catalog No.: Here and There Records #H&T 1001 | |

Singles

| Year | Album details |
|---|---|
| 1987 | Skipper: Label/Catalog No.: Polydor 13CX1444 / YO8707; Format: Polydor KK cassette single |
| 1990 | Standing Outside in the Rain: Label/Catalog No.: Cypress YY 5007 –; Format: 7 inch vinyl |
| 1990 | Standing Outside in the Rain: Label/Catalog No.: Cypress YD 17889; Format: CD single |
| 1990 | Tell Me, Tell Me: Label/Catalog No.: Cypress YY 8068; Format: |
| 1991 | Play Your Guitar For Me: Label/Catalog No.: NTI, From the Peter White (musician) album "Réveillez-Vous" |
| 1994 | I Wanna Be With You: Label/Catalog No.: Crisis 599 999; Format: 2 CD Single |

Tim Timmermans & Skipper Wise

| Year | Album details |
|---|---|
| 1989 | Poems of the Five Mountains: Label/Catalog No.: Higher Octave Music #HOMCD7018 |
| 1989 | Compilations You Can Help Save The Ocean: Label/Catalog No.: Teichiku Records TECP-25895 |
| 1989 | Wave Aid II: USA Benefit album for AIDS research: Label/Catalog No.: KTWV02-2 |

=== Windows ===
| Year | Album details | Peak chart positions |
|---|---|---|
| 1983 | Windows: Label/Catalog No.: Intima/Capitol #SJ-73219 | |
| 1984 | Is It Safe: Label/Catalog No.: Intima/Capitol #SJ-73218 | |
| 1986 | Mr. Bongo: Label/Catalog No.: Intima/Capitol #SJ-73220 | No. 3 NAC (R&R), |
| 1989 | Tell Me, Tell Me: Label/Catalog No.: Cypress YY 8068 | |
| 1989 | The French Laundry: Label/Catalog No.: Cypress/A&M #YD0124 | No. 1 NAC (R&R) |
| 1989 | Single-New Sneakers: Label/Catalog No.: Cypress – YD 17813; Format: CD single | |
| 1990 | Blue September: Release: Label/Catalog No.: Cypress/Goldcastle/A&M #71336 | #3 NAC (R&R) |
| 1992 | Windows – The First Three Years: Label/Catalog No.: DA Music/Blue Orchid #2011 | |
| 1992 | From The Asylum: Label/Catalog No.: DA Music/Blue Orchid #2014 | No. 12 NAC (R&R) |
| 1993 | My Red Jacket: Label/Catalog No.: DA Music/Blue Orchid #2012 | |
| 1993 | So Many Times – Single: Label/Catalog No.: Blue Orchid 2012-2 | |
| 1994 | Live Laundry: Label/Catalog No.: DA Music/Blue Orchid #2013 | |
| 1995 | Apples & Oranges: Label/Catalog No.: DA Music/Blue Orchid #2017 | |
| 1996 | A Funky Distinction: Label/Catalog No.: DA Music/Blue Orchid #2022-2 | |

=== Colour Club ===
| Year | Album details | Peak chart positions |
|---|---|---|
| 1994 | Colour Club: Label/Catalog No.: JVC 2034-2 | NAC (R&R): No. 7 |
| 1994 | Freedom Words – Japanese Release: Label/Catalog No.: VICJ-5091 | |
| 1994 | Freedom Words – Single: Label/Catalog No.: JVC-8005-2 | |
| 1994 | Trust Me – Single: Label/Catalog No.: JVC DPRO-126 | |
| 1996 | In The Flow: Release: Label/Catalog No.: JVC / VTX 3004-2 | |
| 1996 | In The Flow Japanese Release: Label/Catalog No.: VICP-5681 | |
| 1996 | If It's All Good – Single: Label/Catalog No.: (JVC) VVPRO-304; Format: 12 inch single | |
| 1996 | If It's All Good – Single: Label/Catalog No.: (JVC) VDPRO-304; Format: CD Single | |
| 1996 | Pearls – Single: Label/Catalog No.: (JVC) VDPRO-306; Format: CD Single | |
| 1997 | Sexuality: Label/Catalog No.: JVC / JMI 7002-2 | |
| 1997 | Tenderness – Single: Label/Catalog No.: | |

=== Production and other appearances ===
| Year | Album details | Peak chart positions |
|---|---|---|
| 1990 | Réveillez-Vous: Peter White; Label/Catalog No.: Chase Music Group #CMD8027 | No. 1 NAC |
| 1990 | Play Your Guitar For Me – Single: Peter White; Label/Catalog No.: NTI Music (France) 7 LM 100 & 8 LM 100 | 7 inch / CD |
| 1992 | Excusez-Moi: Peter White; Label/Catalog No.: Sin-Drome CGD1802 | No. 1 NAC |
| 1991 | Heartsong: Stephen Longfellow Fiske; Label/Catalog No.: Higher Octave Music #HOMCD7037 | |
| 1996 | Torrid Rain: Dave Camp; Label/Catalog No.: Blue Orchid #2020-2 | |
| 1996 | L.A. Story 1: Label/Catalog No.: Warner/Chappell Music Library: CHAP 217 | |
| 1996 | L.A. Story 2: Label/Catalog No.: Warner/Chappell Music Library: CHAP 218 | |

=== Music videos ===
| Song | Album | Video Link |
|---|---|---|
| Standing Outside in the Rain | The Clock and the Moon: Release: 1990; Details: Released in Europe for MTV and European Television | Live , Music Video |
| Play Your Guitar For Me | Réveillez-Vous: Release: June 1991; Details: Produced in France for French Television | Music Video |
| Freedom Words | Colour Club: Release: 1995; Details: Produced by Mitchel Linden, nominated for Billboard Video New Artist | Music Video , Remix |
| If It's All Good | In The Flow | Music Video |
| Pearls | In The Flow | Music Video |
| Tenderness | Sexuality: Details: Directed by Mitchell Linden. | Music Video |
