= Roto-Rooter =

Plumbing company

Roto-Rooter Services Company
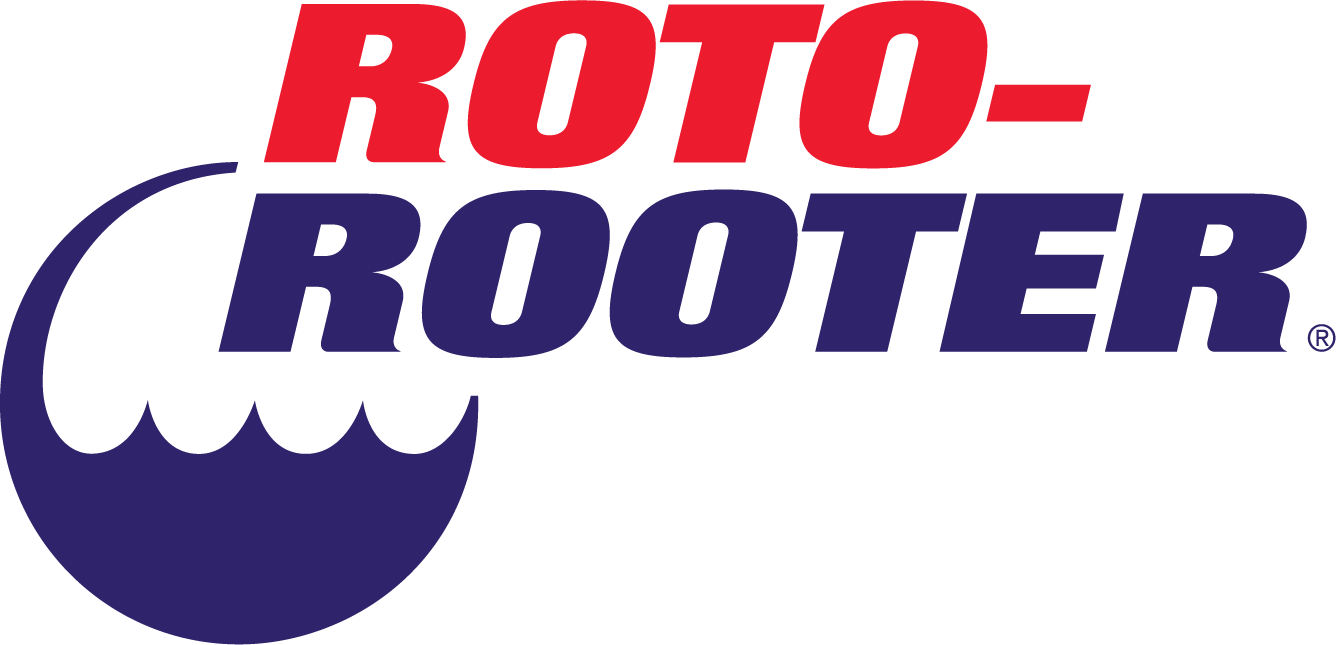
- Type: Subsidiary
- Industry: Plumbing, Sewer and Drain Cleaning, Water and Water Damage Cleanup
- Founded: 1935; 91 years ago
- Founder: Samuel Oscar Blanc
- Headquarters: Cincinnati, Ohio, US
- Key people: Spencer Lee (CEO); Kevin J. McNamara (CEO & President, Chemed Corporation); Robert Goldschmidt (President); David P. Williams (CFO & Vice-President)
- Number of employees: 3,600
- Parent: Chemed Corporation
- Website: rotorooter.com

Roto-Rooter Services Company, ((also known as Roto-Rooter Plumbing & Drain Service) is a plumbing company based in Cincinnati, Ohio.

The company, founded in 1935, originally specialized in clearing tree roots and other obstructions from sewer lines.

In the 1980s, some Roto-Rooter franchises and company-owned locations began to offer around-the-clock service and general full-service plumbing repair for both residential and commercial customers.

Roto-Rooter's plumbing services represent a major part of the company's business. The company has more than 600 service locations operating throughout North America that serve more than 90% of the US population in all fifty states, and more than 40% of the Canadian population. Roto-Rooter is the largest provider of plumbing repair and sewer and drain cleaning services in both countries.

International franchise operations have been established in Canada, Japan, the Philippines, Hong Kong, Indonesia, Singapore, Brazil, South Africa, and Australia.

As of 2020, Roto-Rooter employs thousands of plumbers, and service technicians throughout the US and Canada who provide plumbing and sewer and water damage cleanup services. Roto-Rooter also employs manufacturing technicians and assembly workers at its manufacturing plant in West Des Moines, Iowa. The plant manufactures the company's patented, proprietary Roto-Rooter sewer and drain cleaning machines as well as sewer and drain cleaning cables and blades. Roto-Rooter is one of the two subsidiary divisions of the publicly traded Chemed, of which the other one is a hospice care provider VITAS Healthcare.

== Early years ==
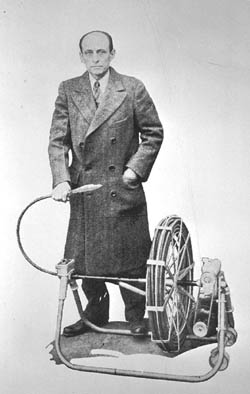
Sam Blanc with an early Roto-Rooter sewer cleaning machine

In the late 1920s, Samuel Oscar Blanc (1883–1964) was cleaning a blocked sewer at his son's (Milton L. Blanc) Des Moines, Iowa, apartment to seek a better solution than digging up the sewer line to remove tree roots that had invaded the underground sewer pipe.

By 1933, Samuel Blanc had fashioned a sewer-cleaning machine from a washing machine motor, wheels from a child's little red wagon, and a 3/8-inch (9.5 mm) steel cable. The cable rotated with a sharp C-shaped blade attached to the tip. The rotating motion cut tree roots out of sewer lines, eliminating the need to dig up pipes and clear obstructions by hand, thus inventing the world's first heavy-duty plumber's snake. Blanc's wife, Lettie (née Lettie Jensen), called his invention the "Roto-Rooter".

By the mid-1930s, Blanc was selling his patented "Roto-Rooter" machines for $250 and incorporated a business around it called Roto-Rooter Corporation. Many in need during the Great Depression started their own Roto-Rooter businesses throughout the upper Midwest, the Great Plains, and the Northeast. Roto-Rooter's sewer cleaning service allowed homeowners to avoid digging up lawns and landscaping to reach underground sewer pipes. This breakthrough was a revolutionary concept. In the 1930s and 40s, Roto-Rooter featured an illustration of a mound of dirt over a recently excavated sewer pipe with the caption, "Why put a grave in your yard?"

In 1939, after his Roto-Rooter sewer cleaning machine proved successful, Sam Blanc designed and built a smaller model that operated on the same principle but could clean and clear bathroom and kitchen sink drains as well as laundry drains and other household plumbing drains. Blanc also built a much larger version of the Roto-Rooter machine called the Roto-Rooter Royal. It had to be towed by a truck and featured a 10-horsepower gasoline engine and 1000 feet of steel cable. It was capable of cleaning large industrial and municipal sewer pipes. An improved version called "The Mainliner" was introduced in 1958 that could also thread telephone cable. It was discontinued in 1973.

== Company ownership ==
In 1980, the Blanc family sold Roto-Rooter Corporation to Cincinnati-based Chemed Corporation. At the time of this sale, Chemed was a subsidiary of W.R. Grace & Co.

In 1981, Chemed ceased being a subsidiary of Grace and became a standalone company.

Chemed began purchasing independent Roto-Rooter franchises and operating them as company-owned service locations under the newly formed Roto-Rooter Services Company, whose corporate headquarters is in downtown Cincinnati. Chemed sold off some of its holdings in Roto-Rooter in both 1984 and 1985, bringing its ownership stake to just below 60%, but launched a bid in 1996 to reacquire the 42% of shares that it had sold off.

On Sept 16 2019, Roto-Rooter acquired all of Hoffman Southwest Corporation’s Roto-Rooter franchise operations for a purchase price of $120 million. The franchised territories included Metro Los Angeles (including Inland Empire, San Fernando Valley, San Gabriel County and Orange County) and San Diego, California; Dallas and El Paso, Texas; Phoenix, Tucson, and Florence, Arizona; Salt Lake City, Ogden, Park City and Provo, Utah; and Portland and Salem, Oregon. Collectively, these Roto-Rooter locations serve a population of approximately 32 million people.

On March 11, 2024, Roto-Rooter completed the acquisition of one franchise in New Jersey for $5.8 million in cash. On March 27, 2024, Roto-Rooter completed the acquisition of one franchise in Texas for $1.5 million in cash. On August 20, 2024, Roto-Rooter completed the acquisition of one franchise in Kentucky for $5.1 million in cash.

On September 16, 2026 Chemed announced that Roto-Rooter acquired its largest independent franchise territory in California, bringing 11 major California market areas under direct company ownership. The purchase included markets such as Palm Springs, Bakersfield, Fresno, Sacramento and the Central Valley. The acquired independent territory previously generated between $50 million and $55 million in annual revenue.

== Corporate identity ==
=== Original logo ===
For the first five years of Roto-Rooter's existence (1935–1940), the company had no official logo and allowed its franchisees to paint their trucks however they saw fit. Due to copycat imitators, Roto-Rooter unveiled the first official Roto-Rooter logo in November 1940. The logo featured the patented Roto-Rooter electric sewer cleaning machine inside of an outline of the United States proclaiming, "A Specialized Service From Coast-to-Coast". The new emblem was used on service vehicles, on guarantees, and in all advertising to help homeowners select the original Roto-Rooter.

=== 1953–1979 ===
In 1953, Roto-Rooter updated the logo to a much simpler design which incorporated a new black and white font with "SEWER-DRAIN SERVICE" inside a drainpipe. This logo was used from 1953 through the 1970s. The only update made to this design was switching out the black outline to a blue outline.

=== 1980–1995 ===
By 1980, Roto-Rooter was in need of an updated logo for its service vans and equipment. The new logo for the 1980s was a refreshed version of the previous logo. The new logo was all blue and eliminated the rightward slant of the previous logo, standing up straight the letters of the Roto-Rooter name. The drainpipe portion was also updated to include more waves.

=== 1996–present ===
In 1996, the Roto-Rooter Visual Identity Program introduced a new logo to replace all previous logos. Variations of this design are still used to this day by Roto-Rooter locations in the United States, Canada, and around the world. The only variation since its introduction was the addition of a single-line logo to complement the over-and-under version. Since the single-line logo uses the same font, it is considered an extension of the other logo.

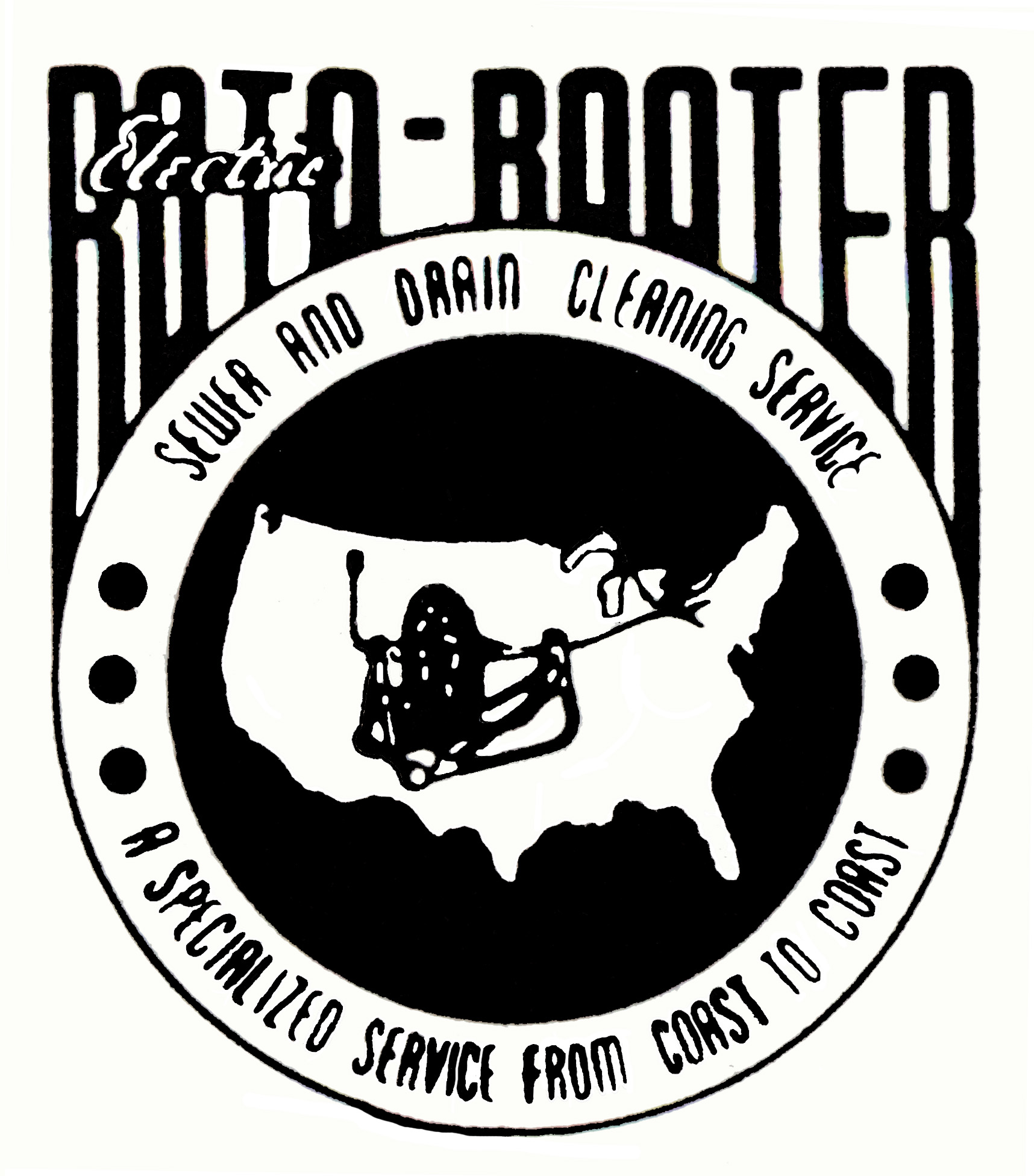
Original Roto-Rooter logo, (1940–1953)

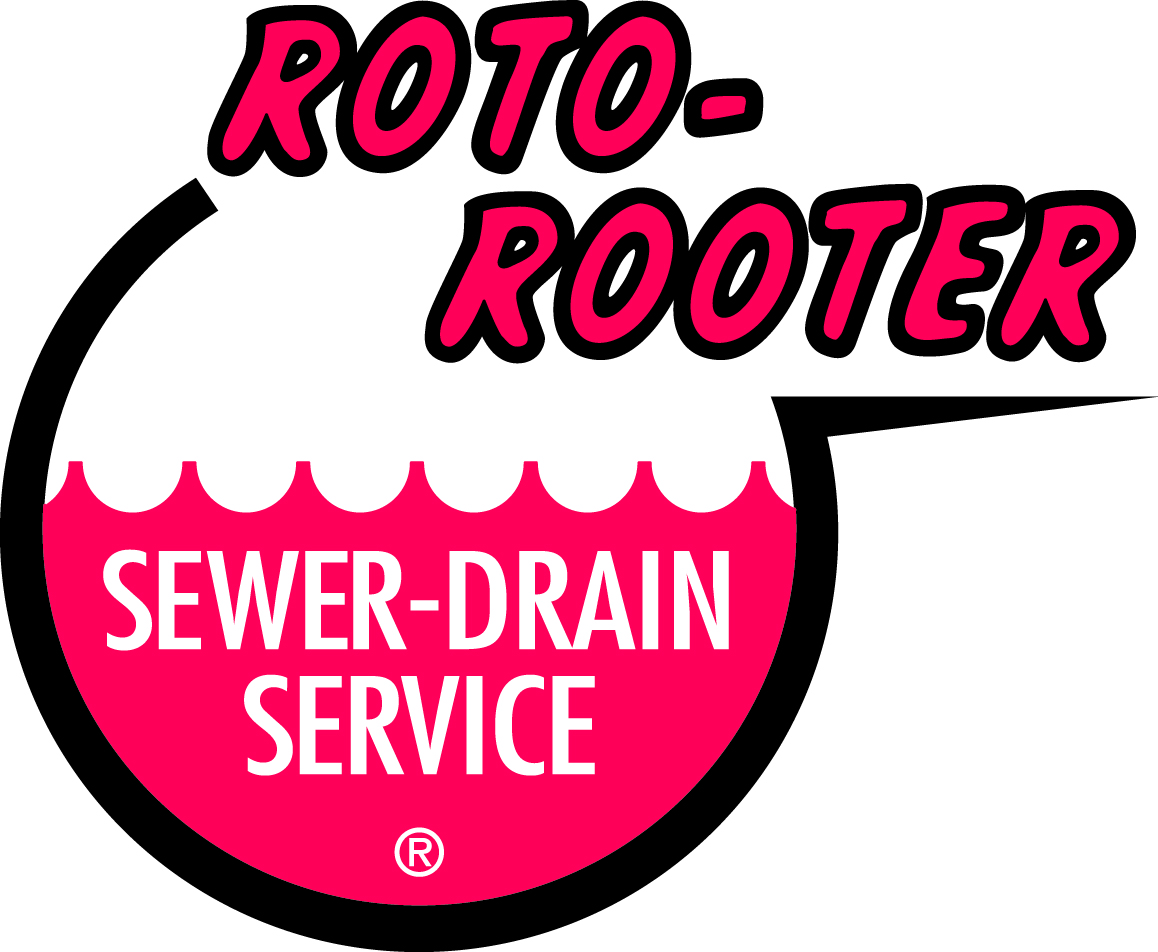
Second Roto-Rooter logo, (1953–1979)

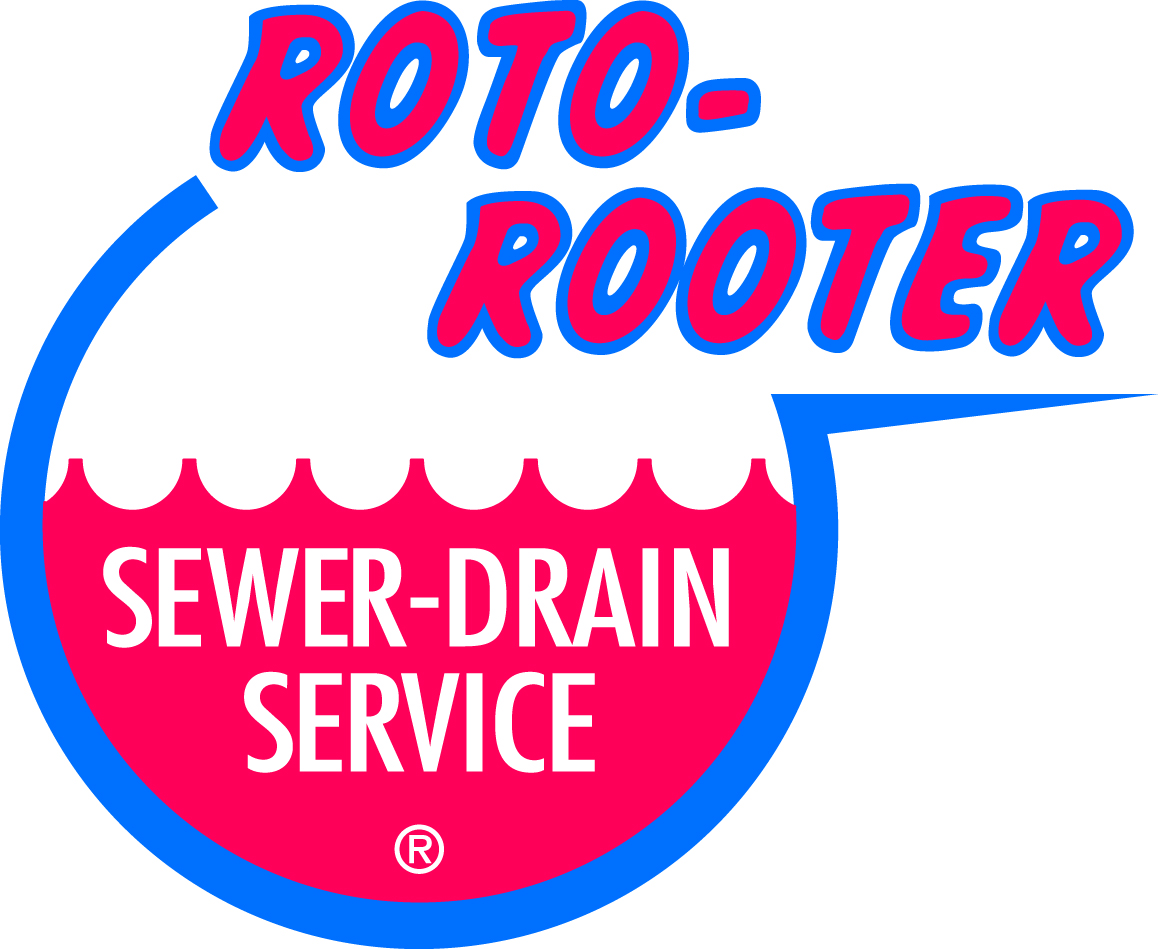
Third Roto-Rooter logo, (1980–1995)

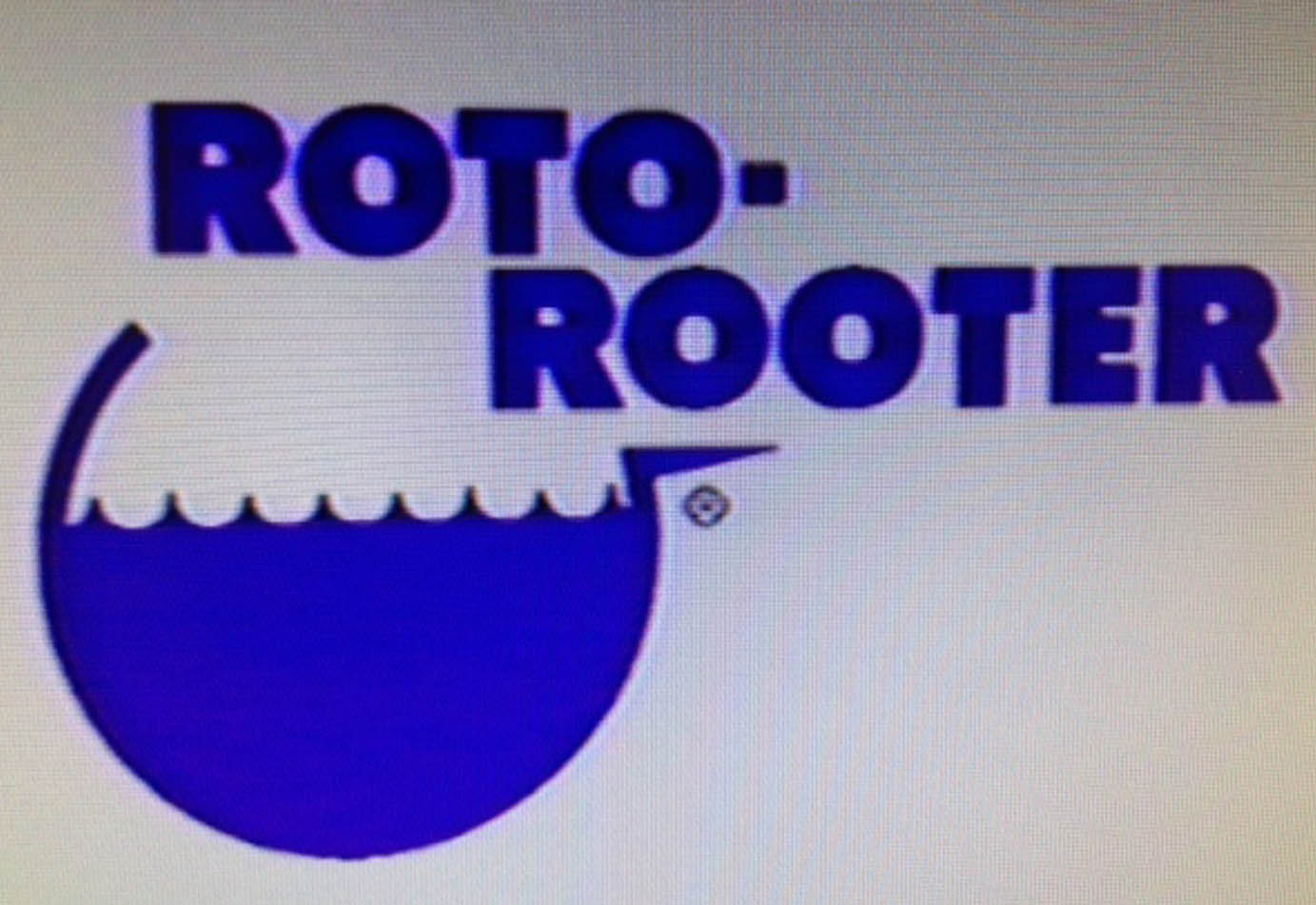
Fourth Roto-Rooter logo, (1980–1995)

== Advertising ==
=== Razor-Kleen! ===
In the 1930s and 1940s, Roto-Rooter service vehicles bore the slogan "Roto-Rooter's patented cutting blades slice through roots and cut them away ... Razor-Kleen!"

=== Away go troubles down the drain ===
The Roto-Rooter advertising jingle used today on TV and radio was created in 1954 and has been one of the longest-running and best-remembered musical jingles in history:

Call Roto-Rooter, that's the name, and away go troubles down the drain.

The memorable bass voice in the commercial was that of Tom Fouts, more widely known as Captain Stubby of Captain Stubby and the Buccaneers.

Many Roto-Rooter TV commercials were introduced over the years featuring the iconic Roto-Rooter advertising jingle.

In "Mr. Plow", an episode of The Simpsons, the jingle for Homer's snowplowing business, Mr. Plow, has a melody and lyrics based on Roto-Rooter's. Lyrics: "Call Mr. Plow, that's my name, that name again is Mr. Plow!"

=== We do both! ===
In December 2017, Roto-Rooter released a TV commercial that introduced a new slogan, "We Do Both", to explain to the public that Roto-Rooter does both plumbing repair and water damage cleanup. The commercial, which began airing on television and in targeted internet ads, features a nosy neighbor asking a Roto-Rooter plumber standing at the curb "what are you doing with the Johnsons' sofa?" The Roto-Rooter plumber explains that the Johnsons had a pipe break that flooded their house and that he had fixed the broken pipe and now Roto-Rooter is "cleaning up the damage".

=== Yeah, We Do That Too! ===
As a follow-up to "We Do Both", in August 2019 Roto-Rooter premiered a sequel slogan campaign titled "We Do That Too" to showcase service options that go beyond the core services of plumbing repair, drain cleaning, and water damage clean-up. The "We Do That Too" campaign highlights the secondary services that Roto-Rooter offers such as pipe inspection, sewer repair, water heater repair, and sump pump replacement.
