= Let's Go, Go-Go White Sox =

Fight song of the Chicago White Sox

"Let's Go, Go-Go White Sox" is the fight song of the Chicago White Sox of the American League.

The song first appeared in 1959 during the White Sox' run for the AL pennant—the team's first league championship since the infamous Black Sox Scandal of 1919. It was written by former White Sox minor leaguer Al Trace and his friend Walter "Li'l Wally" Jagiello. The duo then bounced the song off Tom Fouts, leader of Captain Stubby and the Buccaneers, a popular country band in the Chicago area best known for performing on WLS Prairie Farmer Radio from 1949 to 1960, writing and performing radio comedy (played by rural Illinois and Indiana radio stations well into this century) and writing and performing Radio and Television advertising jingles. The song was released on Jagiello's label, Drumboy Records.

Later, the song was only heard sporadically until June 2005, when team scoreboard operations and TV production director Jeff Szynal dusted off an old record of the tune. He put together a video montage and ran the words across the JumboTron in center field at U.S. Cellular Field during a turn-back-the-clock game against the Los Angeles Dodgers, the team that defeated the White Sox in the 1959 World Series. The White Sox won the game on a walk-off home run by A. J. Pierzynski, and the song has blared over the stadium speakers ever since in rally situations. It became an instant hit, as fans of several generations caught on.

In 2005, the White Sox won 99 games en route to their first division title in five years, their first postseason series win of any kind since the 1917 World Series (in the Division Series), their first World Series appearance since 1959, and their first World Series championship since 1917. In the 2005 postseason, Fox played clips of the song in their playoff coverage. WGN-TV also played the song during the victory parade on October 28, over a series of clips that interwove action footage from 1959 and 2005.
