= Raks Geek =

American performing arts group

Raks Geek is a bellydance, flow arts, and fire performance company based in Chicago, Illinois. They were the first professional group to successfully combine bellydance and firespinning with geek themes in a consistent manner. They are most known for a viral YouTube video featuring a Wookiee bellydancing to a Klingon band playing original music in Shyriiwook, which was listed on UK Channel 4 TV's "50 Funniest Moments of 2012." They are the most well-known example of fusing bellydance with geek themes and are considered one of the top dance companies in Chicago.

Raks Geek were originally a collaboration between Read My Hips tribal bellydance and the Chicago Fire Tribe, but eventually grew into their own company.

Raks Geek is the brainchild of director/producer Dawn Xiana Moon, who formed the company after a late-night internet search for "geek bellydance"; she was disappointed by the artistic and technical proficiency of examples she found. As she was already a professional dancer, she decided to do the topic justice by creating a show by geeks, for geeks. Every performer has been raised on science fiction: Moon was raised on Star Trek and has given talks at C2E2, Google, the University of Chicago, DePaul University, and Chicago Comic Con on issues surrounding women in geek culture, and other members of the group are scientists and organize Chicago geek community gatherings, in addition to being professional performers.

The name of the group means "Dance of the Geeks" or "Geek Dance"; "raks" is an Arabic word (translated "dance") traditionally used by bellydancers. Most of the group's performances are a modern, fusion style of bellydance rather than a traditional one.
