= Blue Microphones =

American audio electronics company

Baltic Latvian Universal Electronics, LLC
- Trade name: Blue Microphones
- Type: Private
- Industry: Audio equipment
- Founded: October 1995; 31 years ago
- Founders: Skipper Wise; Mārtiņš Saulespurēns
- Defunct: 2018
- Fate: Acquired by Logitech
- Headquarters: Westlake Village, California, U.S.
- Parent: Logitech (2018–2023)
- Website: www.bluemic.com

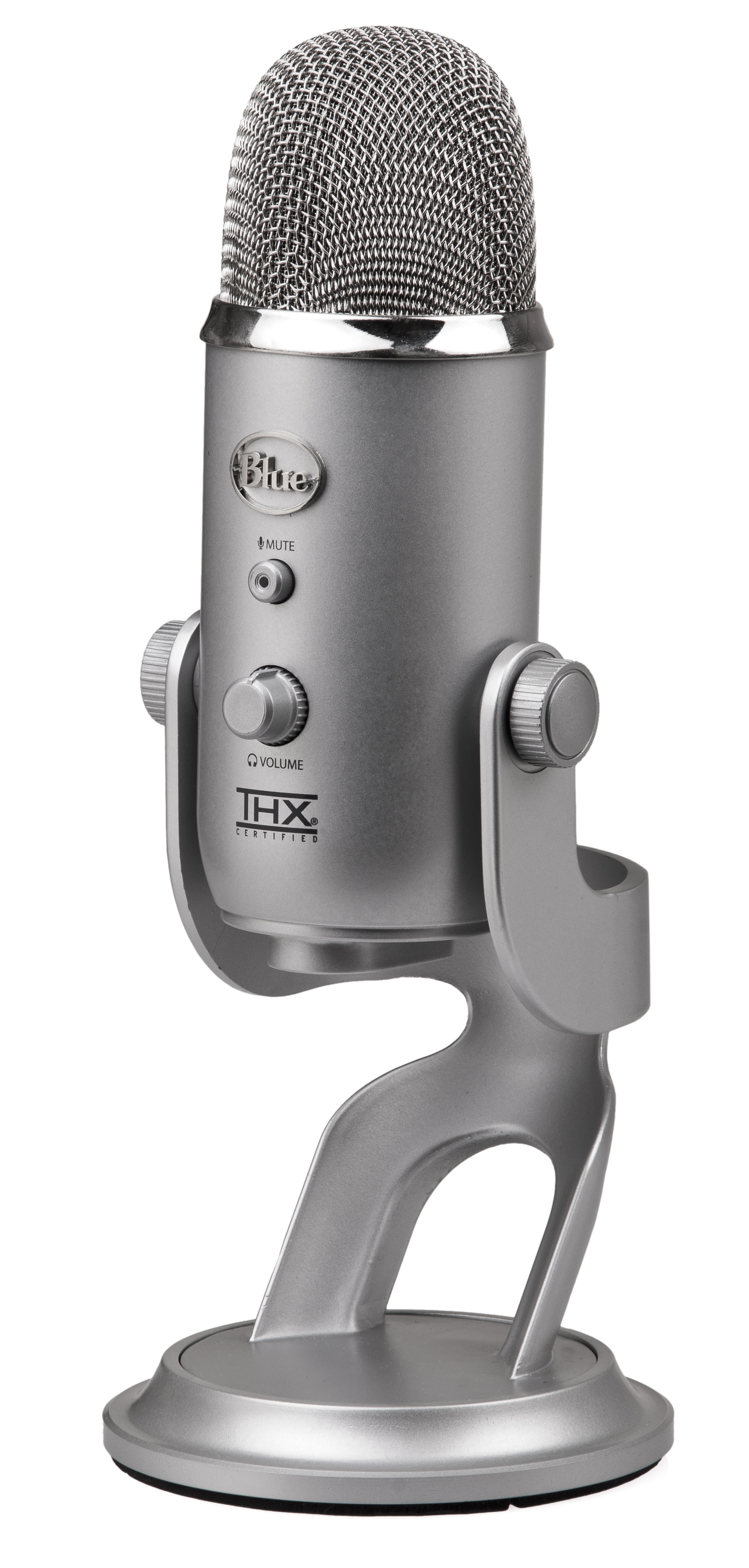
A Yeti USB microphone

Blue Microphones (legally Baltic Latvian Universal Electronics, LLC) was an American audio production company that designed and produced microphones, headphones, recording tools, signal processors, and music accessories for audio professionals, musicians and consumers. It was acquired by Logitech in 2018; the company phased out "Blue" moniker in 2023 while still selling some of Blue Microphones' original products.

== History ==
Blue Microphones was founded in 1995 by American session musician Skipper Wise and Latvian recording engineer Mārtiņš Saulespurēns. The company's name is a backronym for Baltic Latvian Universal Electronics. The company was founded in Latvia. The company is headquartered in Westlake Village, California, United States.

Blue Microphones' first creation was the Baby Bottle, a professional XLR microphone used by musicians for recording. In the early 2000s, Blue's perspective pivoted to manufacturing microphones for collaborating with other creatives online, synonymous with the needs of the developing consumer world of technology in the 1990s. The Westlake Village company created a low-cost condenser microphone called the Snowball for use with music recording software GarageBand in the late 2000s. The size, shape, and weight of the Snowball was created to that of a regulation softball. The Snowball microphone became popular with aspiring professional musicians and hobbyists as an alternative to renting time in a recording studio.

Soon, Blue Microphones continued to manufacture USB microphones. Their top-selling microphone to date, the Blue Yeti, launched in 2009. The Blue Yeti has had many special iterations, including the Yeti X and Yeti Pro.

From 1995 to 2004, Blue microphones were manufactured in Latvia. In 2005, production moved to China, with some microphones being built in the United States.

In 2008, Wise and Saulespurēns sold the company to Transom Capital, a private equity firm in California.

In 2013, The Riverside Company acquired Blue Microphones from Transom Capital. Intrepid Investment Bankers advised Blue Microphones in the transaction.

In July 2018, Logitech announced plans to acquire Blue Microphones for $117 million US Dollars. In June 2023, Logitech announced they would relegate the Blue brand to audio processing technologies, and use the Logitech and Yeti branding for future microphone releases.

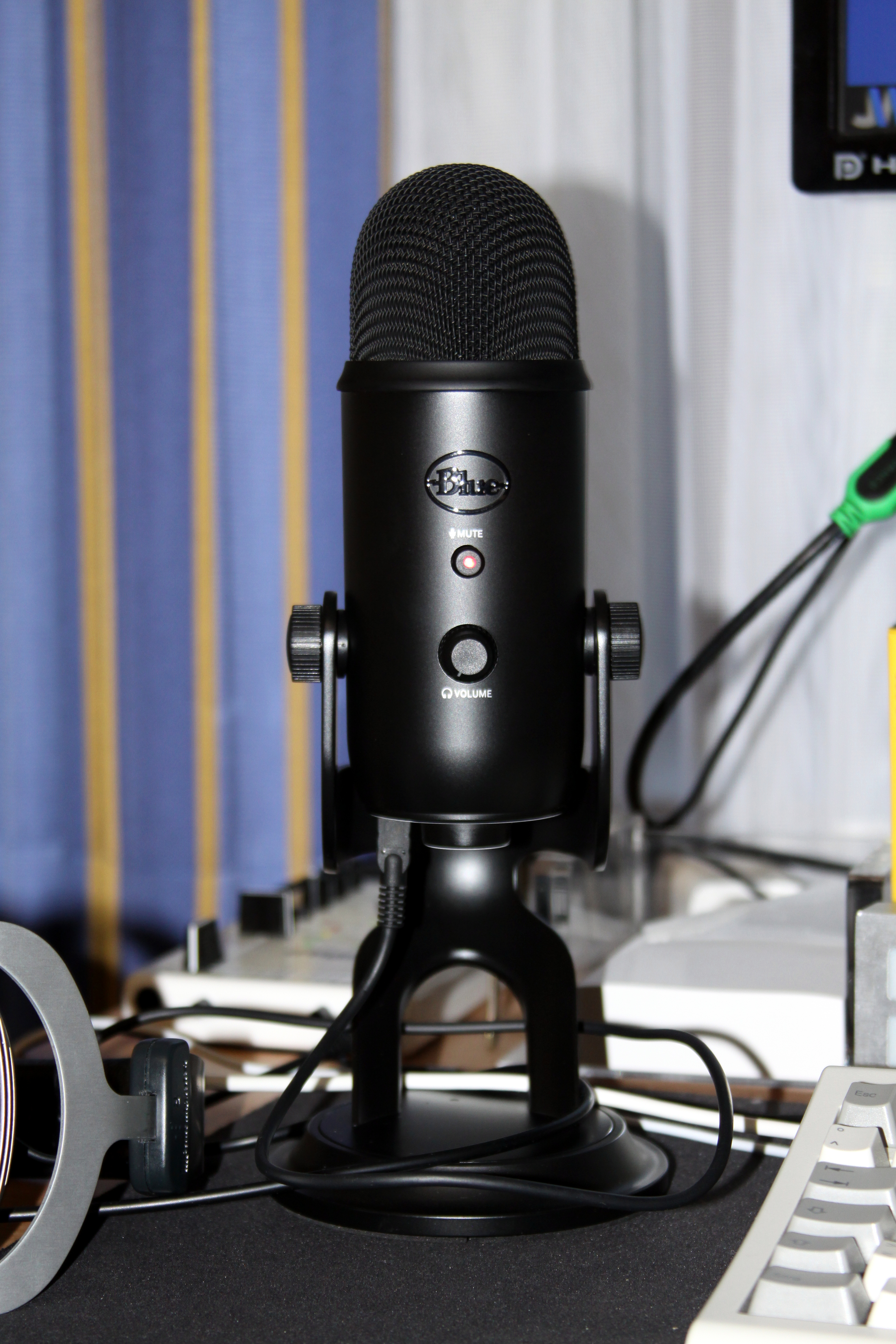
Yeti Blackout

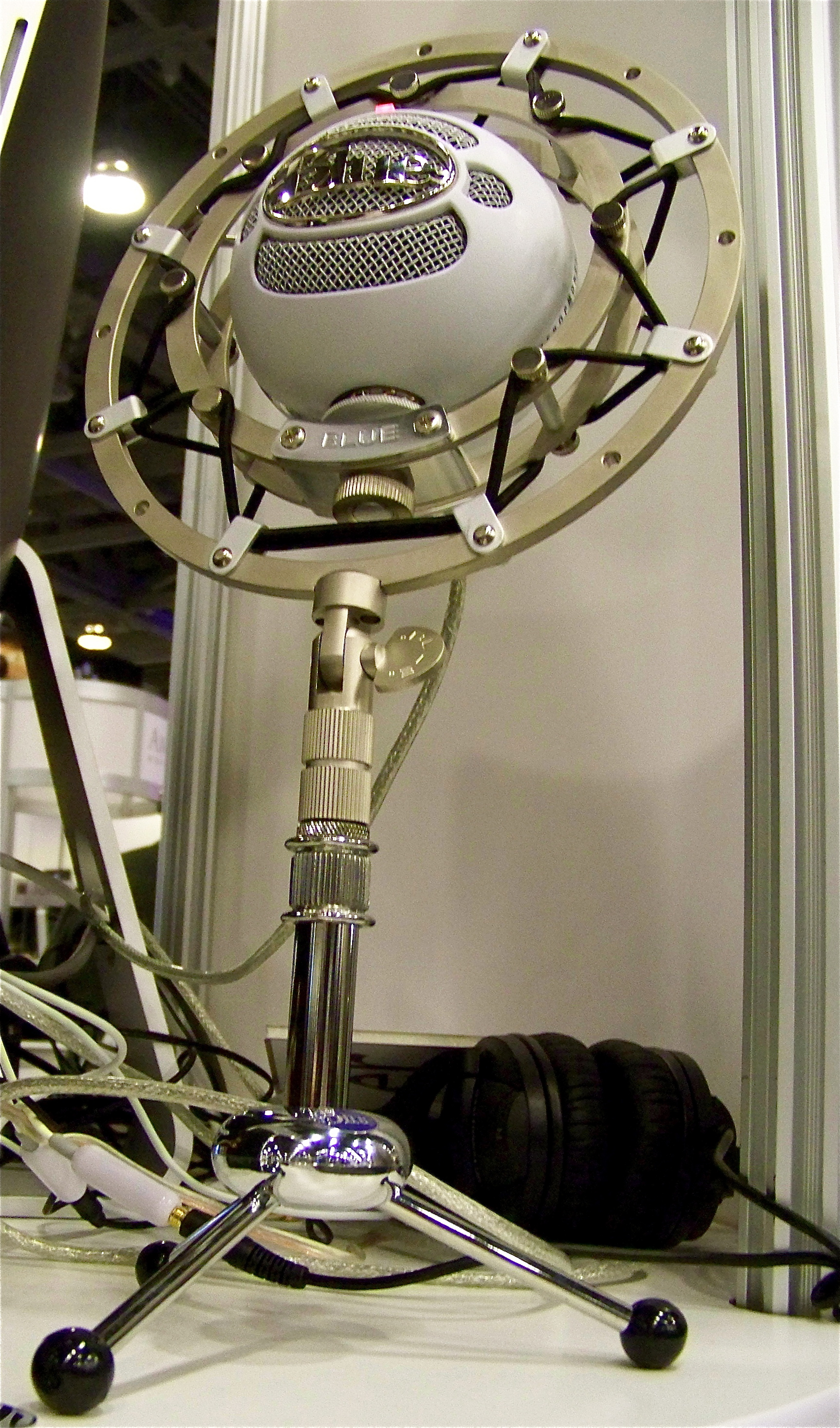
Snowball

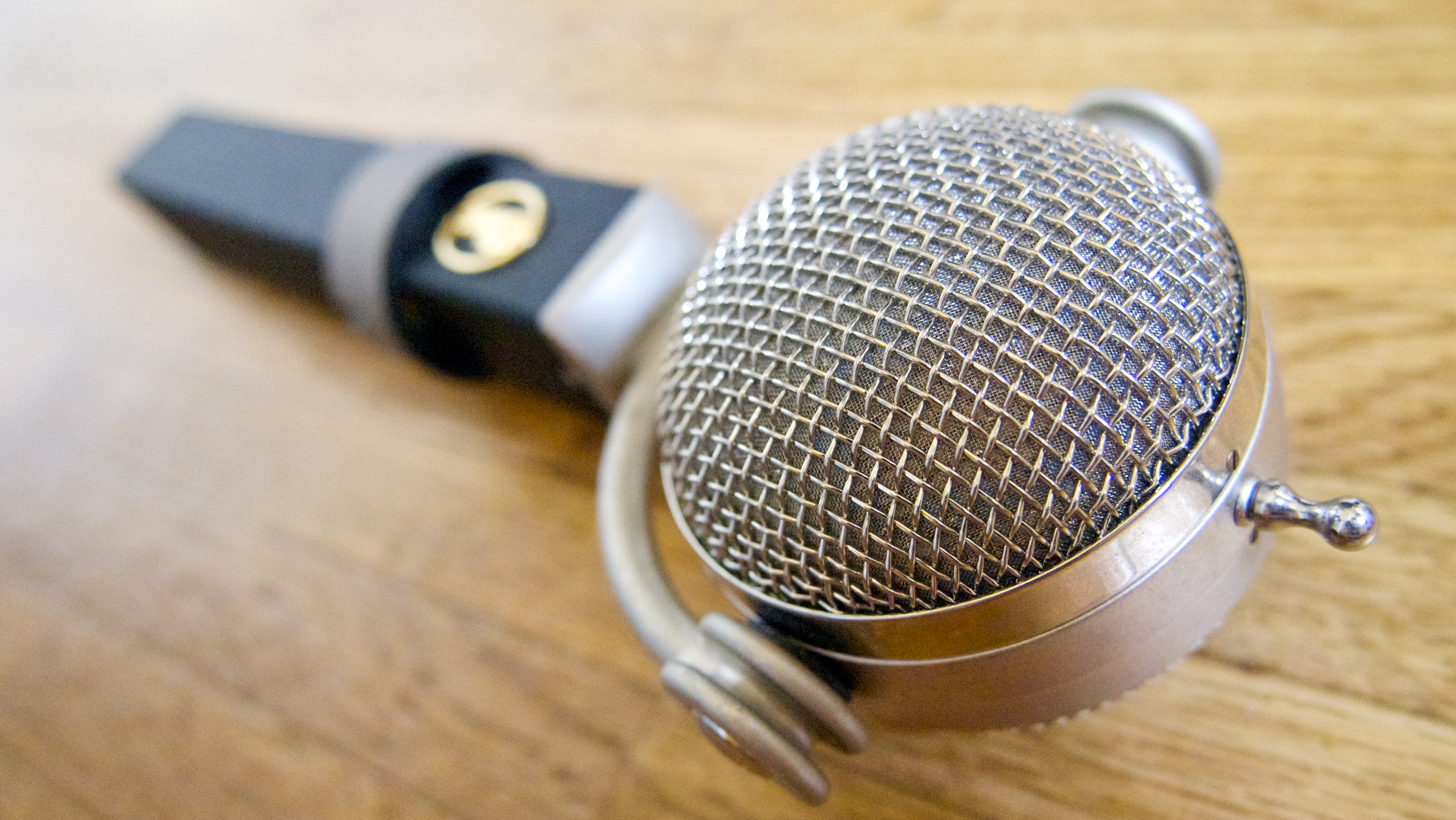
Dragonfly

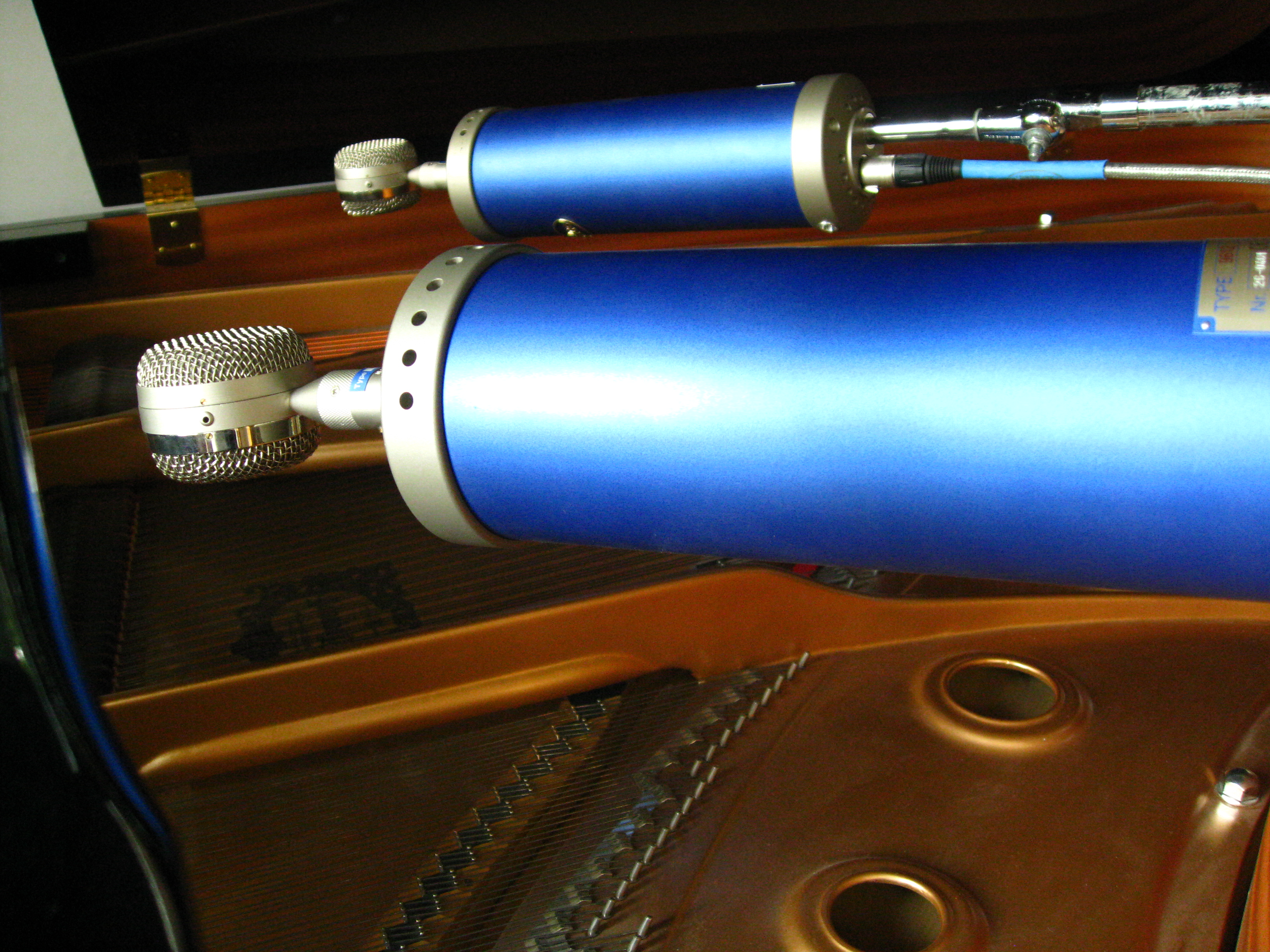
Two Blue Bottle microphones set up to record a grand piano

== Awards ==
- Electronic Musician 2000 Editor's Choice Microphone of the Year - Blueberry condenser microphone
- RetailVision 2009 Best Hardware peripheral – Mikey and Eyeball 2.0
- BeatWeek (formerly iProng) Best in Show 2009, 2010
- Blue Yeti X was awarded for Innovation in 2020 by CES (Consumer Technology Association)

== See also ==
- C-Media – supplier of chips for USB microphones
- List of microphone manufacturers
