= Bill Snyder (bandleader) =

William P. Snyder (November 7, 1916 – Fond du Lac, Wisconsin, May 11, 2011) was an American pianist, bandleader and songwriter of the 1950s.

Snyder studied under Moriz Rosenthal in Paris and served in the Air Force during the Second World War. Snyder first had a massive hit with Lorenz Hart's "Bewitched" in 1950. The song reached the top position on the Cash Box list of "The Nation's Top Ten Juke Box Tunes." Through the 1950s, Snyder was America's most recorded light music pianist with nine gold and one platinum awards for his singles and albums.

== Song compositions ==
- Chicago, the City of Today
- Riding the Off Beat
- Window Shopping
- Cafe Conversation
- Ballerina in Distress
- Choppin' up Chopin
