= Colour Club =

American smooth jazz group

Colour Club is an American smooth jazz group that was founded in the 1990s by Skipper Wise and Les Pierce. Wise and Pierce formed Colour Club in the early 1990s as a combination of smooth jazz and hip hop. For their second and third albums they hired vocalist Lisa Taylor with guest musicians such as Gary Meek and Rick Braun. Their self-titled debut in 1994 included the single "Freedom Words". The video was nominated for an American Music Award.

== History ==
In 1994, Skipper was introduced to Les Pierce who had a Top 40 hit at the time with the pop group “Louie Louie” and was producing the vocal group, Take 6. Skipper was signed to JVC Records for a three album deal along with Les Pierce as the group “Colour Club”

Colour Club, the self-titled album was released on the JVC label in early 1994 and reached number 5 on the NAC radio charts. The album was branded as the new movement in Europe called “Acid Jazz”

The video for the single “Freedom Words” was shot in Zuma Beach, Malibu in Southern Calif and produced by Mitchel Linden. The results yielded a video of the year nominations from The American Billboards Video awards.

The album “In the Flow” was released in 1996 on the JVC/VERTEX label. Now with a permanent singer Lisa Taylor, the album yielded three singles: “Be Yourself” which charted in the top 40 in Japan; “If it’s all Good”and “Pearls.”

The third and final Colour Club record, “Sexuality,” was released in 1997 on JVC/Vertex and the single “Tenderness” was issued. The accompanying video was released and six weeks later JVC America closed its doors.

== Discography ==
Year	Album details
1994	Colour Club: Release: Label/Catalog No.: JVC 2034-2
1994	Freedom Words (Japanese release): Release: Label/Catalog No.: VICJ-5091
1994	Freedom Words – single: Release: Label/Catalog No.: JVC-8005-2
1994	Trust Me – single: Release: Label/Catalog No.: JVC DPRO-126
1996	In the Flow: Label/Catalog No.: JVC / VTX 3004-2
1996	In the Flow (Japanese release): Release: Label/Catalog No.: VICP-5681
1996	If It's All Good – single: Release: Label/Catalog No.: (JVC) VVPRO-304; Format: 12 inch single
1996	If It's All Good – single: Release: Label/Catalog No.: (JVC) VDPRO-304; Format: CD Single
1996	Pearls – single: Release: Label/Catalog No.: (JVC) VDPRO-306; Format: CD single
1997	Sexuality: Release: Label/Catalog No.: JVC / JMI 7002-2
1997	Tenderness – single: Release: Label/Catalog No.:

=== Music videos ===
Song	Album	Link
Freedom Words	Colour Club: Release: 1995; Details: Produced by Mitchel Linden, nominated for Billboard Video New Artist	Music video, remix
If It's All Good	In the Flow	Music video
Pearls	In the Flow	Music video
Tenderness	Sexuality: Details: Directed by Mitchell Linden.	Music video
