= The Uglysuit =

- Origin: Oklahoma City, Oklahoma
- Genres: Rock, Indie rock, Pop music
- Years active: 2007–2010
- Label: Quarterstick Records

The Uglysuit were an indie rock band from Oklahoma City. The lineup was made up of Israel Hindman (lead vocals, guitar), Kyle Mayfield (vocals, guitar, bass, drums), Crosby Bray (vocals, drums, guitar), Jonathan Martin (vocals, piano, organ, guitar), Colin Bray (vocals, guitar), and Dustin Maynord (bass, guitar).

== History ==
Since their formation in 2006 they were known for their genre-bending compositions that range from breezy indie pop, psychedelic folk, shoegaze, rock and hopeful lyrics. Sometimes they can be considered a jam band and have been compared to Phish. The All Music Guide called their debut "one of 2008's most promising records".

== Tours and appearances ==
According to Spinner, as of March 2010 the Uglysuit were currently writing "lots of new material" for their sophomore effort. Prior to playing two official showcases at SXSW 2010, one being for the ASCAP Kick-Off Party, they also performed at the Billions Showcase at Canadian Music Week in Toronto in early March.

In May 2010, they played 2 shows in Los Angeles, CA one at Hotel Café and the Viper Room before beginning on a Summer Tour of the Midwest United States and Northeastern United States with the first performance at the Summer Camp Music Festival at Three Sisters Park in Chillicothe, Illinois. They were scheduled to appear with The Black Keys, Slightly Stoopid, Blues Traveler, Widespread Panic at the Wakarusa Music and Camping Festival in Ozark, Arkansas.

== Breakup ==
After the summer of 2010 and multiple attempts at improving living conditions, Hindman decided a healthier music environment was required for a lasting career. The band decided that the Uglysuit would disband. A new album was recorded prior to the breakup and was released June 14, 2011.

== Discography ==
- The Uglysuit EP (2007)
- The Uglysuit (2008)
- Awwww, Shucks (2011)
