= Captain Stubby and the Buccaneers =

US country-comedy band

Captain Stubby and the Buccaneers was a country-comedy band that performed largely in the Midwest United States from the late 1930s into the 1960s.

== Members ==
- Tom C. Fouts (Captain Stubby) November 24, 1918 – May 26, 2004. Comedy, played novelty instruments, including musical hat rack, tuned toilet seat (gitarlet). Vocalist. Born in Carroll County, Indiana.
- Dwight E. (Tiny) Stokes November 11, 1920 – January 12, 1999. Lead tenor vocals, played bass. Born in Springfield, Missouri.
- Jerald R. Richards – Clarinet, flute, bass clarinet, ocarina, tin whistle. Vocals.
- Sonny Fleming – Played guitar, banjo. Vocalist.
- Peter Kunatz – Accordion, piano.
- Gerald (Curley) Myers – Guitar, banjo, vocals.
- Chuck Kagy – Fiddle, guitar, mandolin.
- Buddy Ross – Accordion.
- Tony Walberg – Accordion.

== History ==
Tom C. Fouts, nicknamed Stubby for his stature, left Indiana Central University after a year, and in 1938 formed a band with five friends. The Six Hoosiers specialized in comedy, Fouts playing novelty instruments like a "tuned toilet seat" he called the "gitarlet."

WDAN radio in Danville, Illinois signed them to a contract, and in 1940 held a contest to rename the Six Hoosiers. The $100 prizewinner suggested Captain Stubby and the Buccaneers. (During performances, Fouts would sometimes refer to them as "Captain Stubby and the bucket of tears.")

Appropriately, the band joined the U.S. Navy in 1944, Entertainment Division, going overseas to entertain sailors. After World War II they signed with WLS Radio in Chicago and performed on the popular National Barn Dance, heard throughout the Midwest.

Captain Stubby and the Buccaneers eventually became regulars on the ABC-TV program Polka Go-Round. They also recorded with five labels, performing many of Fouts' songs. With singer Lola Dee, they recorded the Mercury Records single "Padre" and "Takin' The Trains Out". Fouts was host of a syndicated talk show called Captain Stubby's Special Delivery. He also wrote for and performed on the national Don McNeill's Breakfast Club from 1968 until 1971.

== Advertising ==
Captain Stubby and the Buccaneers first performed the original Roto-Rooter jingle on WLS in the early 1950s, and the recorded version became one of the longest-running tunes in the history of advertising, featuring Tom Fouts' bass voice in "Away go Troubles Down the Drain." Shortly before his death at 85 in 2004, he contributed to nostalgic radio spots for Roto-Rooter.

Captain Stubby also sang the 1959 Chicago White Sox fight song, "Let's Go, Go-Go White Sox", and was the voice of Green Giant's Little Sprout.
