= Tom Fouts =

American writer, farmer, and comedian

Tom C. Fouts (November 24, 1918 – May 24, 2004) was a farmer, author, and comedian. He was popularly known as Captain Stubby of the musical group Captain Stubby and the Buccaneers who were regularly featured on WLS "The Prairie Farmer Station" from 1948 until May 1960 (when the station changed format). He was also known for his syndicated 5-minute radio program called Is Anybody Home with former WLS Radio personality Charles Homer Bill. He was born in Carroll County, Indiana, and grew up there as well. He is perhaps most well known for his low pitched voice in the conclusion of a well known Roto-Rooter plumbing ad, and other radio and television advertisements. Fouts was also well known for his Captain Stubby Sez columns, which appeared in a number of publications, including Prairie Farmer.

Being short and stocky as a child, Fouts earned the nickname "stubby". He was married to Eva Lou Fouts for over 63 years, until his death in 2004. He died in Kokomo, Indiana, after suffering a stroke.

== Filmography ==
| Year | Title | Role | Notes |
|---|---|---|---|
| 1971 | The Emigrant | Pastor Jackson | |
| 1972 | The New Land | Pastor Jackson | |
