= Canasta (band) =

American chamber pop group

- Origin: Chicago, Illinois
- Genres: Baroque pop
- Years active: 2000–present
- Labels: Broken Middle C, RWIM Chicago, Minty Fresh
- Members: Matt Priest; Elizabeth Lindau; Jeremy Beckford; Ryan Tracy; Josh Lava; Sam Koentopp
- Past members: Brendan Byrnes; John Cunningham; Ben Imdieke; David Jensen; Sarah Kneebone; Jeff Leverernz; Angie Ma; Kyle Mann; Megan O'Connor; Brian Palmieri; Colin Sheaff; Joshua Schnable; Ian Wilson
- Website: http://canastamusic.com/

Canasta is a Chicago, Illinois-based chamber pop sextet. Their most recent full-length album, The Fakeout, the Tease and the Breather, was released in May 2010 on the label RWIM Chicago. Prior releases include one EP, Find the Time, one full-length CD, We Were Set Up, and one remix album, We Were Mixed Up. Their song, "Slow Down Chicago", was used in the trailer for the film Diminished Capacity.

== History ==
The band began in 2002 when front man Matt Priest lost his job and had free time to play music. He and co-founder, violinist Elizabeth Lindau, called friends who played different instruments and invited them to join. Those who were dedicated to recording and touring remained and the band was born. The band's goal in determining a line-up was to combine many musical backgrounds and artistic influences.

== Find the Time ==
The band self-released their first EP, Find the Time in 2003. It was mastered by Keith Cleversley of The Flaming Lips and brought the band to the attention of the critics.

=== Track list ===
1. "Slow Down Chicago" - (3:59)
2. "Just a Star" - (5:36)
3. "Chance at Greatness" - (4:48)
4. "Two If by Sea" - (3:40)
5. "The Model" (Kraftwerk cover) - (3:38)

== We Were Set Up ==
In 2005, Canasta released their first full-length album, We Were Set Up, on indie label Broken Middle C, produced by Ted Cho.

=== Reception ===
We Were Set Up
Review scores
| Source | Rating |
|---|---|
| Allmusic | 3.5/5 stars |
| PopMatters | (6/10) |

Ned Raggett of Allmusic wrote that on this album the band "display both an ambition and a sense of range that any number of early 21st century American groups described in similar terms would be wise to follow". Michael Metivier of PopMatters writes that the album "is a lot to digest, and slightly more of a blessing than a curse" and suggests "you might find yourself taking the album in smaller doses". He does go on to write "Each song is a barrage of hooks and nuanced performances" and "Elizabeth Lindau’s violin shines throughout the album" and that the band's "value to the pop music scene continues to grow as it broadens both its geographical and musical reach".

=== Track list ===
1. "Microphone Song" – (4:20)
2. "Firenze" – (4:17)
3. "Slow Down Chicago" – (4:04)
4. "Impostors" – (5:31)
5. "Shadowcat" – (7:28)
6. "An Apology" – (3:25)
7. "Heads Hurt Better" – (5:41)
8. "Just a Star" (feat. Edith Frost) – (5:16)
9. "Sympathetic Vibrations" – (4:00)
10. "Busride" – (5:39)
11. "Money Making Money" – (3:47)
12. "The Things You Don't See" – (4:09)
13. "All This Dust" – (3:26)

== We Were Mixed Up ==
While waiting for their next album to be released, the band released a free-download remix album in 2008.

=== Reception ===
We Were Mixed Up
Review scores
| Source | Rating |
|---|---|
| PopMatters | (7/10) |

Ian Mathers of PopMatters writes that "the styles here veer from dub to disco to folk to orchestral to rap to electro country to just about any other spin you could put on these sounds" and "whatever you like about the band, there’ll be treasure here, and that ought to keep us all favourably inclined to the band until they get some new material together".

=== Track list ===
1. "Microphone Song" (The Claps' "You Want It All But You Can't Have It" Remix) - (6:52)
2. "Firenze" (The Crash Davis Spectacular Mix) - (4:07)
3. "Slow Down Chicago" (Promqueen USA Remix) - (5:17)
4. "Impostors" (Office Remix) - (5:30)
5. "Shadowcat" (Scare Quotes Remix) - (4:56)
6. "An Apology" (J. Schnable's Lonely Robot Voice Mix) - (5:35)
7. "Heads Hurt Better" (Heads Better Hurt Mix, Tuckpointed by Bitmoth) - (3:33)
8. "Just a Star" (Multi-Panel Remix) - (3:01)
9. "Sympathetic Vibrations" (Justin Petertil's Freq. Mod. Mix) - (3:54)
10. "Busride" (DJ STV SLV's Crank Dat Busride Mix, feat. Pop It Off Boyz) - (3:44)
11. "Money Making Money" (Jordan Cohen's Money Making Dub) - (3:44)
12. "The Things You Don't See" (We Can and We Must Remix) - (6:13)
13. "All This Dust" (Eric Ziegenhagen/Geoff Buesing's Dusty Cough Remix) - (3:28)
14. "Microphone Song" (Michael F. Gill's Narration Mix) - (6:43)
15. "Slow Down Chicago" (bill van loo's El Trains Remix) - (4:42)
16. "Just a Star" (Seth Vanek's Milquetoast Mix) - (4:54)
17. "Sympathetic Vibrations" (Sighup's Shared Memory Mix) - (5:43)
18. "Busride" (Tombot's Circulator Edit) - (6:12)
19. "Slow Down Chicago" (boo boo allá Remix) - (4:55)

== The Fakeout, the Tease and the Breather ==
The band's second full-length album was released May 8, 2010.

=== Track list ===
1. "Becoming You" – (6:59)
2. "Mexico City" – (4:33)
3. "Mountains of Molehills" – (4:23)
4. "I Don't Know Where I Was Going with This" – (4:36)
5. "Magazine (Songwriter on a Train)" – (4:55)
6. "Appreciation" – (5:08)
7. "Shortcut" – (5:00)
8. "Reading the Map Upside Down" – (5:00)
9. "Choosing Sides" – (3:50)
10. "Throwaway" – (5:30)
11. "Plan Your Escape" – (5:48)

== "Slow Down Chicago" ==
The song "Slow Down Chicago", which has been included in the band's first three releases, was featured in the theatrical trailer for Diminished Capacity. The band's violinist, Elizabeth Lindau, has said of this "it is totally hilarious to see Matthew Broderick and Alan Alda walking in slow motion to your song".

== Members ==
- Matt Priest - Lead vocals, bass, trombone, percussion
- Elizabeth Lindau - Vocals, violin, percussion
- Jeremy Beckford - Guitar, vocals
- Ryan Tracy - Keyboard, piano, bass, vocals
- Josh Lava - Piano, keyboard, vocals
- Sam Koentopp - Drums
