= Music at sporting events =

Use of music at sporting events

The use of music at sporting events is thousands of years old, and has recently become popular again. Some sports have specific traditions about pieces of music played at particular events. Others have made the presentation of music very specific to the team—even to particular players. Music may be used to build the energy of the fans, and may also be introduced in ways that are less directly connected with the action in a sporting event.

== History of music at sporting events ==
The ancient Greeks intently tied the performance of music to sporting events, particularly at their quadrennial Olympic Games.

"The extent to which cultural elements were included in the Pan-Hellenic games is enlightening. At several festivals, including Delphi, Isthmia and Athens, music played a prominent role in the athletic contests."

The revival of the Olympic Games in 1896 also incorporated music into the festivities surrounding the competitions. On March 25 of that year, "the Philharmonic Orchestra played the national anthem and the first Olympic Hymn, written by poet Kostis Palamas and set to music by the well-known Greek composer Spyridon Samaras."

== Entrance music ==
Entrance music (also known as an entry theme, walk-on music, or walk-up song) is a musical piece or song that is played for athletes when they first appear in front of the spectators before an event.

== Music used for dramatic effect ==
Composer Carl Orff's O Fortuna is often used, as it is recognizable from its first two notes due to its many uses in films, and its booming operatic vocals and percussive instrumentation convey a sense of drama and importance. O Fortuna is based upon a 13th-century poem from the collection known today as Carmina Burana. Orff's composition laments fate, and it forms the beginning and end of his interpretation of the poem.

== Association of songs with sporting events ==
Certain songs have historically been associated with particular sporting events. Fans of the home team at collegiate athletic events may serenade the losing visitors with a song recorded by Steam, titled "Na Na Hey Hey Kiss Him Goodbye", with its familiar refrain, "na na, na na na na, hey, hey, hey, goodbye."

Queen's standards '"We Will Rock You" and "We Are the Champions" have also become common fare at sporting events, as have Five Stone's "Make Noise", Gary Glitter's "Rock and Roll Part 2", and Zombie Nation's "Kernkraft 400". Most collegiate sports are accompanied by a band that plays brass and drum instrumental music designed to accentuate the experience.

=== American football ===
Many college football teams have marching bands that play during the game and march on the field at halftime.

Currently two NFL teams have marching bands:

- The Washington Commanders have featured a marching band since 1938.
- The Baltimore Ravens have featured a marching band since their inception in 1996; however, Baltimore's Marching Ravens, in Baltimore, MD, dating to the All-American Football Conference (a league which merged with the NFL) featured a marching band when it began in 1947, went through many years with the Colts, and continued operations after being abandoned by the Irsay family when the team moved to Indianapolis in 1984. However, that band stayed intact in the area and began playing at other events, including the Preakness Stakes, and was used for the two-year CFL experiment known as the Baltimore Stallions. When the NFL returned to Baltimore with an expansion team in 1996 (the NFL suspended the Cleveland Browns franchise, and awarded an "expansion team" in Baltimore in a complex deal), the loyal band was rewarded by becoming the new Ravens' marching band. For the two years that the Ravens played at the Memorial Stadium (former home of the Baltimore Colts) they remained "The Marching Colts". Once the new stadium opened in 1998, the group's name was changed to Baltimore's Marching Ravens to reflect the new era for the new team.

The Los Angeles Rams had a marching band during their times at both the LA Coliseum and Anaheim Stadium. The practice was abandoned when the team relocated to St. Louis.

The Seattle Seahawks adopted The Verve's "Bittersweet Symphony" as their theme song, and it is heard whenever something special happens to the home team. For instance, when the team takes the field to a sellout crowd, the song blares throughout the reverberating stadium, and when the Seahawks score the game-winning field goal, it would undoubtedly be played. When the New England Patriots come out from the tunnel, Ozzy Osbourne's hit "Crazy Train" is played. A common song for the New Orleans Saints during and since their Super Bowl Season is "Half-time", or "Stand Up and Get Crunk" by Ying Yang Twins. The song "Big Easy Mafia" is played prior to all New Orleans Saints games while the players are warming up and the fans are pouring into the stadium to hype everyone up. Green Bay Packers play Todd Rundgren's "Bang the Drum All Day" after every Packers touchdown at Lambeau Field.

A common choice of music to be played over PA systems as games are being kicked off is "Start Me Up" by the Rolling Stones and "Welcome to the Jungle" by Guns N' Roses.

=== Association football ===
In the many countries where football is popular, and in the UK in particular, football music is a varied and popular subgenre of popular music. Songs are often released to coincide with specific events, such as the World Cup, or to become anthems for particular teams. Since football has a huge spectator base, such songs are often very popular on the charts. Examples of music created to be football songs include New Order's "World in Motion", and "Three Lions" by The Lightning Seeds in collaboration with comedians and football fans: David Baddiel and Frank Skinner. A subset of football music is novelty football music, which typically includes humorous lyrics. Examples of novelty football songs include "Vindaloo" by Fat Les, "Meat Pie, Sausage Roll", and numerous Frank Sidebottom songs.

The Village People/Pet Shop Boys song "Go West" has also become popular, and an instrumental version of the music was used as the theme for the 2006 World Cup.

Liverpool adopted "You'll Never Walk Alone", specifically the version performed by Merseybeat band Gerry & The Pacemakers, as its theme song. Manchester City have adopted Blue Moon as their song whilst I'm Forever Blowing Bubbles can be heard at games involving West Ham United. Stoke City fans' anthem has been Delilah since the 1970s.

=== Australian rules football ===
Each team in the Australian Football League has its own theme song with original lyrics referencing the team and the sport of Australian rules football. Older teams' songs are based upon traditional melodies (such as When the Saints Go Marching In for the St Kilda Saints) while newer teams' themes have original melodies. A team's song is played once as they walk onto the field, and several times after winning a game. The song is also sung by the winning team in their clubrooms after the game.

=== Basketball ===
At NBA games, repetitive organ music is played at key points of the game. For example, the announcers often play the "Charge" fanfare to accompany the home team entering the visitor's side of the court with possession of the ball. A different theme is used to encourage the home team in defense of their own side of the court. Many NBA teams now play a particular theme to accompany the home team taking the court to begin the game. They also use chants such as the defense chant to show support and pump up the crowd.

The NCAA does not use organ music, but in many Division I schools, a smaller pep band plays at games (as compared to the full-size football marching bands). However, during a 2004 game between Michigan State University and the University of Kentucky at Ford Field, both teams' full football marching bands played.

=== Baseball ===
Ballpark music performed by an organist debuted at Chicago's Wrigley Field in 1941, and had spread to most other Major League parks by the 1960s.

Beginning in the mid-1970s, pre-recorded pop and rock music began to supplement the organ music (or replace it entirely) at many ballparks. A very popular theme song is "Meet the Mets" from 1962 when the Mets joined the MLB. The Mets also had a theme song for their World Series run in 1986, "Let's Go Mets".

In the modern evolution of the sport, many athletes now have "theme songs" that are played when they come up to bat. Slate notes that Major League Baseball players "can pick several songs as personal themes for their plate appearances, sometimes a rotation of four different tracks a game." Indeed, in 2004, the Wall Street Journal reported that the longtime organist for Dodger Stadium "has been usurped by a deejay who sits directly below her. He plays a selection of hip-hop and rock, interspersed with devices designed to pump up the crowd and the stadium's volume." In that same year, the Dropkick Murphys' version of a 1902 Red Sox fight song ended up inspiring Red Sox fandom, as their team headed to victory in both the 2004 ALCS and the 2004 World Series.

The Atlanta Braves are known for an organist whose primary duty is playing the visiting player's walkup music, which is often fan-selected or plays on a player's name, with special dispensation for certain players. Former Braves usually are greeted with the theme to Welcome Back, Kotter. Georgian natives receive the state's popular regional anthem "Georgia on My Mind". Players who played college baseball at one of the currently 15 Atlantic Coast Conference (ACC) or currently 14 Southeastern Conference (SEC) schools (both conferences' fan bases reach the city) or Big Ten school Maryland (which had been an ACC member until the 2013-14 season, since former Terrapins probably made visits to the state of Georgia while playing college baseball) receive their respective school's fight song. (The fight song is played for all players who played at current ACC schools Louisville, Notre Dame, and Pittsburgh or current SEC schools Missouri and Texas A&M—the five most recent members of the respective conferences in baseball—even if their team played in the American (then–Big East) or Big 12 conference at the time.)

The practice of using a heavy metal theme song to signal the entrance of a relief pitcher began at Qualcomm Stadium in 1998, when the San Diego Padres started playing "Hells Bells" by AC/DC to accompany Trevor Hoffman's taking the mound. San Jose Mercury News and ESPN.com wrote that the song should be honored by the National Baseball Hall of Fame and Museum. The use of rock and roll for entrance music emerged from the comedy film Major League (1989), in which relief pitcher Rick "Wild Thing" Vaughn entered the game to a cover of "Wild Thing" performed by X. In addition, batters will often select a song to play as they come to the plate in home games.

==== Repertoire ====
In some cases a particular song may be played at a specific time in the game.

Take Me Out to the Ball Game is often played or sung at major- or minor-league baseball games, typically during the seventh-inning stretch.

At Fenway Park, Neil Diamond's song, "Sweet Caroline," is played during the eighth inning of Boston Red Sox home games, and has been a regular part of the program since 2002.

Since 2006, Sweet Caroline has also played over the sound system during the middle of the eighth inning of New York Mets home games.

Consequently, Diamond's hit single became a standing tradition after several years of playing it based upon the home-team's performance.

=== Combat sports ===
Entrance music includes:

- Ricky Hatton - Blue Moon by
- Wanderlei Silva - Darude - Sandstorm
- Anderson Silva - DMX - Ain't No Sunshine
- Roy Nelson - "Weird Al" Yankovic - Fat
- Brock Lesnar - Metallica - Enter Sandman
- Vitali Klitschko - Rammstein - Sonne

YouTuber and rapper KSI tends to use his own music as his entrance themes, most notably Down Like That, in which a live performance was held for KSI's walkout.

=== Hockey ===
Many NHL hockey teams feature an organist to lead crowd chants, cues and other prompts. Hockey organists may adapt popular music for the organ and play genres such as rock, film scores, or pop on the organ in instrumental form. Hockey was the first sport to adopt "Rock and Roll Part 2" as a goal song, initially to accompany when the Kalamazoo Wings would score, and spreading as the DJ of that team went onto work with the Colorado Rockies and started the practice there. When the Rockies moved to New Jersey to become the New Jersey Devils in 1982, the song stayed with them. 29 of the 32 teams in the NHL went on to use "Rock and Roll Part 2" as a goal song at one point.

=== Roller derby ===
Walk-on music used in roller derby, also called skate-out music, has been a part of the sport since its very beginning.

Skate-out music
League	Team	Song	Artist
Gotham Girls Roller Derby	All-Stars	"Turn Down for What"	DJ Snake ft. Lil Jon
Minnesota RollerGirls	All-Stars	"Boneless"	Steve Aoki
Minnesota RollerGirls	Minnesota Nice	"Roller Girls"	The Soviettes

=== Snooker ===
As part of Barry Hearn's vision for the future of the professional game, walk-on music was introduced from the 2010 World Snooker Championship. As of the 2012 World Snooker Championship, the last 32 players and their walk-on music was as follows:

Walk-on music
Player	Song	Artist
Mark Allen	"Titanium"	David Guetta feat. Sia
Stuart Bingham	"In the Air Tonight"	Phil Collins
Luca Brecel	"Earthquake"	Labrinth feat. Tinie Tempah
Cao Yupeng	"Blah Blah Blah"	Kesha
Ali Carter	"Good Feeling"	Flo Rida
Dominic Dale	La donna è mobile	Giuseppe Verdi
Mark Davis	"Don't Stop 'til You Get Enough"	Michael Jackson
Ryan Day	"One Step Beyond"	Madness
Ding Junhui	"Poker Face"	Lady Gaga
Ken Doherty	"Irish Rover"	The Pogues
Graeme Dott	"Two Tribes"	Frankie Goes to Hollywood
Peter Ebdon	"Wrapped Up in Time"	Marillion
Marco Fu	"I Gotta Feeling"	Black Eyed Peas
David Gilbert	"Superstylin'"	Groove Armada
Martin Gould	"The Game"	Motörhead
Barry Hawkins	"Beautiful People"	Chris Brown
Stephen Hendry	"Get the Message"	Electronic
John Higgins	"Nowhere to Hide"	Arnold McCuller
Andrew Higginson	"Love Will Tear Us Apart"	Joy Division
Jamie Jones	"Sexy and I Know It"	LMFAO
Stephen Lee	"Pump It"	Black Eyed Peas
Liang Wenbo	"Zhongguoren"	Andy Lau
Liu Chuang	"Down"	Jay Sean
Stephen Maguire	"Here I Go Again"	Whitesnake
Shaun Murphy	"Disco Inferno"	The Trammps
Ronnie O'Sullivan	"Drops of Jupiter"	Train
Joe Perry	"I'm Finding It Harder to Be a Gentleman"	The White Stripes
Neil Robertson	"Heart of Courage"	Two Steps from Hell
Mark Selby	"Underdog"	Kasabian
Matthew Stevens	"OMG"	Usher
Judd Trump	"High on Life”	Martin Garrix feat. Bonn
Mark Williams	"Jump"	Van Halen

=== Wrestling ===
Wrestling companies often have an inhouse composer composing theme music for wrestlers. They also may use stock music.

Many wrestlers have used many themes over the course of their careers. Some wrestlers like Ric Flair and "Macho Man" Randy Savage are known for their one particular entrance theme song, Also Sprach Zarathustra and Pomp and Circumstance respectively.

=== Theme music in other sports ===
Entire teams will occasionally adopt a theme song (such as the Chicago Bears with their 1985 Super Bowl Shuffle, sung by the members of the team). Up until 2011, Monday Night Football had its own theme, sung by Hank Williams, Jr.; the Hockey Night in Canada theme has sometimes been referred to as Canada's second national anthem; and the Olympic Games have long had powerful theme music composed to accompany ceremonies opening and closing the games.

Perhaps the most extreme example of this can be found in professional wrestling and some mixed martial arts promotions, where almost every wrestler has an entry theme written to suit their particular character.

An album entitled "ESPN Presents Stadium Anthems" has been released that includes many songs that are played over the Public Address system at North American sporting events. Similar albums, such as Jock Jams, have been released in the past.

== See also ==
- Figure skating § Music and clothing
- Fight song
- Football chant
- Personal anthem
- Prelude (music), a short piece of music which may serve as an introduction
- Stadium anthem
- Stadium organist
- Theme music
- Wedding music, music played during wedding the ceremony or at festivities before or after the event
