= Lumberjack Band =

Marching band of the Green Bay Packers

- The Lumberjack Band in a 1950 program
- Nickname: "Green Bay Packer Band"
- Location: Green Bay, Wisconsin, U.S.
- Founded: 1921
- Director: Wilner Burke (1939–82); Lovell Ives (1982–97)
- Fight song: "Go! You Packers Go!"

The Lumberjack Band, later known as the Green Bay Packer Band, was the official marching band of the Green Bay Packers, an American football team from Green Bay, Wisconsin, United States in the National Football League (NFL). The Band, which wore flannel uniforms to look like lumberjacks, traced its roots to volunteer groups in the 1920s that would play during Packers' games. The Band was formalized in 1938 and a year later was put under control of the Packers, with Wilner Burke named as band director. The Band played polka, swing music, pep songs, and marches, including being the first group to play the Packers fight song "Go! You Packers Go!".

Two of Green Bay's most notable coaches, Curly Lambeau and Vince Lombardi, each took special roles in supporting the Band. Lambeau provided a dedicated bandstand in the Packers' stadiums; he was convinced that the Band helped enhance the gameday experience and motivated the team to play better. Decades later, Lombardi oversaw an update to the Band's look, a modernization of their performance, and a renaming to the "Green Bay Packer Band". Burke served as director until 1982, when he handed off his role to his deputy Lovell Ives. The Band was disbanded in the late 1990s, as video screens and recordings took their place. The group was reformed as small groups called the "Green Bay Packers Tailgaters" and then the "Packers Tundra Line" that would play in the parking lot of Lambeau Field during pre-game tailgating and during games.

== History ==
The Green Bay Packers were formed in 1919, playing two seasons against local teams in the Wisconsin region. In 1921, the team was admitted to the American Professional Football Association (APFA), which would be renamed a year later to the National Football League (NFL). That same year, the Lumberjack Band was established by George DeLair, who founded the Band to travel with the Packers as they went on the road to play teams in the region. The Band's goal was to entertain fans and create a lively gameday experience, similar to college marching bands. The Band wore flannel uniforms to look like lumberjacks, with logging a prevailing industry in the area. In 1931, the Band first played "Go! You Packers Go!", the team's official fight song. In the late 1920s and early 1930s, the Band was funded through community donations and primarily travelled with the team to games against the Chicago Bears. At the time, the Band was made up of members of the American Legion band, but in 1933 there was a dispute with the American Legion and the Band was taken over by the city of Green Bay, Wisconsin, with the city council renaming it to the "Green Bay City Band".

In 1938, the Packers took over control of the Band, formalizing its membership and performances. The Packers wanted to make the atmosphere at games more lively and engaging. A year later, Wilner Burke was named as the band director, a role he would hold until 1982. Burke played for the Band and the American Legion band in the 1930s. As part of the Band's reinvigoration, a new arrangement for "Go! You Packers Go!" was developed to better match the composition of the Band. During this time, local high school musical groups took part in the Band's performances. In 1942, the Green Bay Press-Gazette reported that Band members were paid by the Packers for their performance and rehearsals, while also providing all the necessary facilities to play. Although they were paid, most of the musicians were affiliated with other local musical groups. World War II impacted the Band's membership, causing the Packers to bring in high school and college students. In addition to musicians, the Band incorporated other performers, including women. When a band member brought their three-year-old daughter to perform, the team began a group of majors and majorettes that performed with the Band. At the time, the Band featured a mix of polkas, pep songs, and swing music.

When Vince Lombardi became head coach and general manager, he upgraded the Band's look, saying the traditional flannels did not fit with the team's new stadium. He also did not want to "contribute to the myth that anything north of Milwaukee was a logging camp." The band was renamed simply "The Green Bay Packer Band" and was set up in the southwest corner of the field. The uniforms changed to green blazers and gray pants with gold stripes. In 1961, the Press-Gazette noted that the Band was 30 members in size, played swing and marching music, and in addition to their gameday obligations, the Band also played public concerts, special events, rallies, parades, and other public events. At the time of Lambeau's death in 1965, he was dating Mary Jane Sorgel, a majorette for the Band. Lombardi called the Lumberjack Band "the best playing band in the National Football League." After Burke retired as band director in 1982, his deputy, Lovell Ives, took over. This marked a transition for the Band, as they moved away from marching music to more popular and modern music.

== Disbanding ==
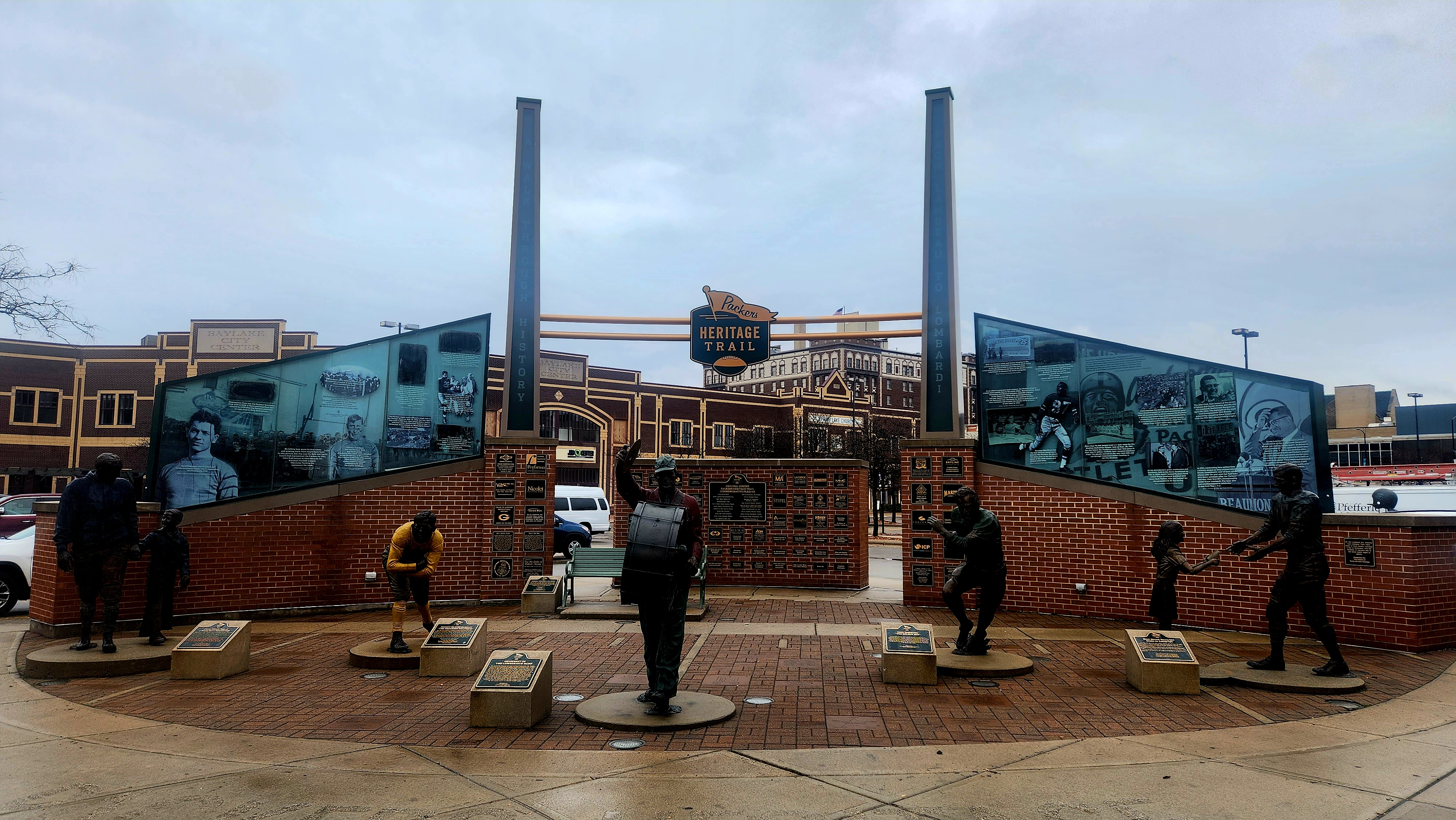
The Packers Heritage Trail plaza showcases a statue of a band member, honoring the Lumberjack Band.

In the 1990s, the use of recorded music and the airing of advertisements on video screens led to the band's playing time being cut back. By the late 1990s, the band was disbanded and re-formed as three six-piece bands called the "Green Bay Packers Tailgaters", which roam the Lambeau Field parking lot before games, playing songs by request for tailgating fans. The Tailgaters name was changed to the "Packers Tundra Line", a drum line that performs before and during games. The Packers Heritage Trail included a statue in its plaza of a band member, honoring the history of the Lumberjack Band.

== See also ==
- Baltimore's Marching Ravens
- Washington Commanders Marching Band
