= Commanders–Cowboys rivalry =

National Football League rivalry

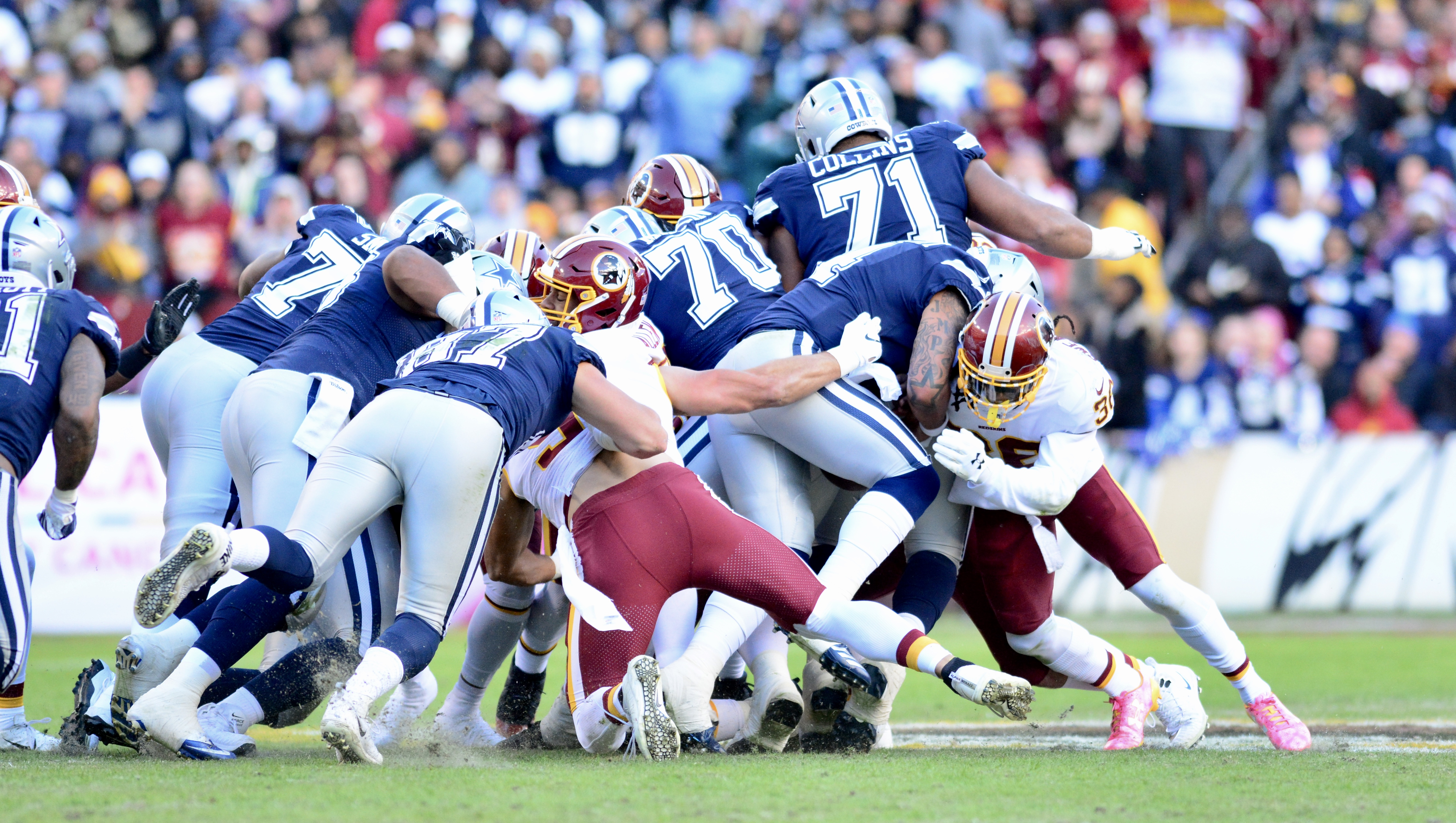
- Redskins and Cowboys face off during the 2018 season.

- Washington Commanders Dallas Cowboys
- Location: Washington, D.C., Dallas
- First meeting: October 9, 1960; Redskins 26, Cowboys 14
- Latest meeting: September 20, 2026; Cowboys 37, Commanders 20
- Next meeting: January 9/10, 2027
- Stadiums: Commanders: Northwest Stadium; Cowboys: AT&T Stadium

Statistics
- Total meetings: 133
- All-time series: Cowboys: 82–49–2
- Regular season series: Cowboys: 82–47–2
- Postseason results: Commanders: 2–0
- Largest victory: Cowboys: 56–14 (2021); Commanders: 35–7 (2005)
- Most points scored: Cowboys: 56 (2021); Commanders: 41 (1986), (2020)
- Longest win streak: Cowboys: 10 (1997–2002); Commanders: 4 (1986–1988)
- Current win streak: Cowboys: 2 (2025–present)

Post–season history
- 1972 NFC Championship: Commanders won: 26–3; 1982 NFC Championship: Commanders won: 31–17

The Commanders–Cowboys rivalry, formerly known as the Cowboys–Redskins rivalry, is a National Football League (NFL) rivalry between the Washington Commanders and Dallas Cowboys.

In 2005, Sports Illustrated called it the top NFL rivalry of all time and "one of the greatest in sports." ESPN ranked it the best rivalry in the NFL. The Sportster has ranked it the 17th biggest rivalry in the world. During the tenure of this rivalry, the two franchises have won 32 combined division titles and eight combined Super Bowls. They are two of the wealthiest franchises in the NFL. The rivalry started in 1960 when the Cowboys joined the league as an expansion team. During that year they were in separate conferences, but played once during the season. In 1961, Dallas was placed in the same division as Washington, and from that point on, they have played each other twice in every regular season.

The Cowboys lead the overall series, 82–49–2. The two teams have met twice in the playoffs, with the Commanders winning both games.

== Beginning ==
Texas oil tycoon Clint Murchison, Jr. was having a hard time bringing an NFL team to Dallas, Texas. He tried buying two teams, but the negotiations fell through. In 1958, Murchison heard that George Preston Marshall, owner of the Washington Redskins, was eager to sell the team. Just as the sale was about to be finalized, Marshall called for a change in terms. Murchison was outraged and canceled the whole deal.

Around this time, Marshall had a falling out with the Redskin band director, Barnee Breeskin. Breeskin had written the music to a fight song, "Hail to the Redskins", now a staple for the team. Breeskin wanted revenge after the failed negotiations with Marshall. He approached Murchison's lawyer and sold the rights for $2,500 ($27,306.57 in 2024). Murchison then decided to create his own team, with the support of NFL expansion committee chairman, George Halas. Halas decided to put the proposition of a Dallas franchise before the NFL owners, which needed to have unanimous approval in order to pass. The only owner against the proposal was George Preston Marshall, as the Redskins were the only NFL team in the Southern United States at that time, and did not want a professional team in Texas encroaching in their territory, as they saw it. However, Marshall found out that Murchison owned the rights to Washington's fight song, so a deal was finally struck. If Marshall showed his approval of the Dallas franchise, Murchison would return the song. The Cowboys were then founded and began playing in 1960.

To build the roster of an expansion team, Dallas was allowed to pick certain players from certain teams per League rules. In addition to selecting three players from the Redskins roster, the Cowboys traded their first round (#2-Norm Snead) and sixth round (#72-Joe Krakoski) draft choices in the 1961 NFL draft to the Redskins in exchange for Pro Bowl quarterback Eddie LeBaron, convincing him to come out of retirement to become the franchise's first starting quarterback.

== First few games ==
Though both teams would become juggernauts in the National Football League, the beginning of the rivalry was not all that exciting.

The first game took place in Griffith Stadium on October 9, 1960, and was won by the Redskins 26–14; the Redskins would not win any of their last ten games in 1960 and would finish with a record of 1–9–2 (as part of a 23-game winless streak that ended in the last week of 1961), while the Cowboys would finish winless with a record of 0–11–1.

The Redskins would go on to win two of their first four meetings, and tie the two others.

== Cowboy Chicken Club ==
In December 1961, an unknown number of Cowboys fans snuck into D. C. Stadium, armed with bags of chicken feed. When Alaskan snow dogs were to drag Santa Claus onto the field during the halftime show, the pranksters would unleash dozens of hungry chickens onto the field – 75 white, one black. The significance of the black chicken was to symbolize how Marshall was the only owner in the league who would not recruit an African-American football player; Marshall stating, "We'll start signing Negroes when the Harlem Globetrotters start signing whites."

The chickens fit into two large crates, which were smuggled into the stadium the morning of the game. The chickens and the smugglers went unspotted until halftime, when a stadium usher noticed a man guarding the crates and heard the chickens. Though the guard tried to bribe the official with $100, he was quickly reported and arrested, and the chickens confiscated. As it turned out, the "official" was actually Redskins general manager Dick McCann.

The following year and the night before the third Redskins-Cowboys match-up in less than a year, pranksters sneaked into Marshall's hotel suite and dropped off a large turkey in the bathroom. When Marshall went into the bathroom, the turkey puffed up and gobbled at him, causing Marshall to flee his room. "Chickens are nice", Marshall said, "but a man shouldn't fool with a mad turkey."

Just minutes before kickoff, while "Hail to the Redskins" blared throughout the stadiums, four banners reading "CHICKENS" – one at each 50-yard line and one in each end zone center – were unfurled in the stadium's upper decks. Two acrobats, hired by Cowboys fans and Chicken Club founders Bob Thompson and Irv Davidson (along with the University of Maryland students with the banners) rushed onto the field dressed in chicken costumes and began to throw colored eggs. One was apprehended by a guard, but the other proved to be too elusive. By this time, the band was playing the National Anthem, therefore unable to move. The lone chicken-acrobat reached into this bag and released a chicken, then returned to his egg-throwing. Running to a sideline, he then attempted to leave the stadium by jumping over a bench, but slipped.

A group of security guards then apprehended him, but he was able to break free. He made it back to the 50-yard line, turned a cartwheel, then ran and flopped onto the 30-yard line. By this time, only aware that the National Anthem was over, the two teams rushed onto the field in the middle of the chaos. In the midst of the ruckus, the man made it off the field and into the stands. Although the real chicken was caught, the acrobat-chicken was never apprehended.

The next day, while reporting the 38–10 Cowboys victory, the Dallas News scoring summary ended with, Attendance-49,888 (and one chicken).

== 1965 – 1967 ==
November 28, 1965, DC Stadium: The Cowboys quickly took a 21–0 lead on a pass play, a running play and a 60-yard fumble recovery. Despite Jurgensen's 26-yard touchdown pass to Charley Taylor, the fans in the stands called for him to be benched in favor of second-string quarterback Dick Shiner. However, Jurgensen then drove the Redskins down field for a second touchdown to cut the Cowboys lead to 24–13. They then scored a rushing touchdown to make it 24–20. But just when the Redskins were gaining momentum, Meredith tossed a 53-yard scoring touch to Frank Clarke. Jurgensen was then able to throw another touchdown pass to Bobby Mitchell to make it 31–27. The Redskins got the ball back on their 20-yard line with less than two minutes to go. After working his way down the field, Jurgensen passed to tight end Angelo Coia to give the Redskins their first lead, 34–31, with about one minute to play. But Meredith was not done either. He drove the Cowboys to the Redskins 37-yard line with seven seconds to go. Danny Villanueva was then brought in and attempted a tying field goal, but it was blocked by Redskins defensive back Lonnie Sanders. Final: Redskins, 34 – Cowboys, 31

November 13, 1966, DC Stadium: In the second quarter with the score 7–6 Dallas, Meredith threw a 52-yard touchdown to Bob Hayes, followed in the third quarter with a 95-yard repeat, making the score 21–7. Then Washington scored three consecutive times with Jurgensen's 4-yard pass to Jerry Smith and 78-yard pass to Charley Taylor, followed by a Charlie Gogolak field goal, giving them the lead, 23–21. Meredith then drove the Cowboys down field to set up a one-yard touchdown run by Dan Reeves. But the Redskins matched their score on a drive ending with Jurgensen's 18-yard scoring pass to Taylor, making it 30–28. Meredith got the ball back with no timeouts and the Redskins playing deep prevent. Somehow, he was able to drive them to the Redskins 33. The Redskins mounted a strong pass rush to push the Cowboys out of field goal range. But apparently it was too strong. Meredith was hit just as he scrambled out of bounds. The penalty put the Cowboys on the Redskins 12 for an easy Villanueva field goal. Final: Cowboys, 31–Redskins, 30

December 11, 1966, The Cotton Bowl: The Redskins took a 10–7 lead at the half after linebacker John Reger recovered a block punt and ran it in for a score. But Danny Villanueva then kicked a tying 26-yard field goal for the Cowboys and Bob Hays caught a 23-yard pass for the 17–10 lead. The Redskins tied it up on Bobby Mitchell's 11-yard reception from Jurgensen. The Cowboys regained the lead when Dan Reeves broke for a 67-yard touchdown run, making it 24–17. But the Redskins then drove the field and scored on Jurgensen's 11-yard pass to Jerry Smith, only to have the Cowboys regain the lead with a six-yard touchdown run by Don Perkins, making it 31–24. Jurgensen was then able to hit Charlie Taylor with a 65-yard touchdown pass that Taylor caught between two defenders, tying the game. After good defense, the Redskins got the ball back with two minutes to go. Starting at their 46-yard line, Redskins running back A. D. Whitfield ran right for a 30-yard gain that set up Charlie Gogolak's winning field goal. Final: Redskins, 34 – Cowboys, 31

October 8, 1967, DC Stadium: The Redskins led 14–10 with 70 seconds to go in the fourth quarter. The Cowboys took possession on their 29-yard line. On fourth down with 23 seconds remaining, Meredith hit an open Dan Reeves who beat out linebacker Chris Hanburger to score, making it 17–14. After the kick-off with seven seconds to go, Jurgensen pitched a long pass to Charley Taylor, but he was tackled at the Cowboys 20-yard line as time ran out. Final: Cowboys, 17 – Redskins, 14 Washington would win the rematch in Dallas that season, 27–20, but the Cowboys closed out the decade with four straight wins over the Redskins. In the late 60's the Redskins hired Vince Lombardi to try to stop ex-Giants coordinator Tom Landry. Lombardi's 7–5–2 record with the Redskins was the team's first winning season in 14 years, but he was still swept by the Cowboys. Lombardi's untimely death in 1970 froze Redskins development for two seasons.

== 1970s ==
After a losing season in 1970, the Redskins' hired George Allen as head coach from the Los Angeles Rams. Under Allen, the Skins in 1971 went 9–4–1, including a 20–16 victory at the Cowboys, against whom Allen carried particular hatred. As the 1972 football season approached, preseason predictors were touting the Cowboys, who had defeated the Dolphins, 24–3 in the previous Super Bowl, to again win the NFC East.

October 22, 1972, RFK Stadium: Both teams came into the game with a 4–1–0 record. Sonny Jurgensen was Washington's starting quarterback, with Billy Kilmer benched after a previous loss. Craig Morton was the Cowboys' quarterback while the injured Roger Staubach watched from the sideline. Despite Washington's home-field advantage, the Cowboys were favored by a touchdown. A field goal and a Morton touchdown pass gave Dallas a 10–0 lead at the end of the first quarter, which was extended to 13–0 in the second period. Jurgensen led a Washington drive that climaxed with a pass to Larry Brown for a touchdown, but at the half, the Redskins trailed by six points. Another seven points were added to the lead in the third quarter when Walt Garrison scored a touchdown. But then, Larry Brown broke a run for 34 yards and a touchdown to make the score to 20–14. Curt Knight kicked a 42-yard field goal to make it 20–17. Charley Harraway ran for 13 yards to make the score 24–20, Redskins on top. During this offensive scoring period, the Over-the-Hill Gang defense shut down the Cowboys. Ultimately, Washington defeated the Cowboys, which moved the Redskins into first place in the NFC East.

December 31, 1972, RFK Stadium (NFC Championship): On the New Year's Eve playoff game, Redskins Quarterback, Billy Kilmer connected with Charley Taylor on a 15-yard touchdown pass, and Washington had a 10–3 lead at halftime. In the fourth quarter, Kilmer again went to Taylor for a 45-yard touchdown. Knight added three more field goals that period, and the Over-the-Hill Gang defense allowed only a second-quarter field goal. The final score was Washington 26, Dallas 3.

October 8, 1973, RFK Stadium: Roger Staubach had won back the quarterback job after missing most of the 1972 season with a shoulder injury, but Tom Landry pulled him in the third quarter when he missed an important signal and was sacked by the Redskins defense. Dallas led 7–0 when Craig Morton replaced Staubach. Late in the fourth quarter, the game was tied 7–7 when Redskins defender Brig Owens picked off Morton's errant pass and raced 26 yards to score a touchdown. The Cowboys threatened in the last seconds to tie the game, but Ken Houston tackled Walt Garrison on the one-yard line as time ran out, preserving a 14-7 Redskins win.

November 28, 1974, Texas Stadium: Before this Thanksgiving Day matchup, the Redskins were 8–3 and ready to secure a playoff berth with a win against the Cowboys (6–5) in a nationally televised game from Texas Stadium in Irving, TX. With less than ten minutes to go in the third quarter, Washington was leading 16–3 when Redskins linebacker Dave Robinson knocked Roger Staubach out of the game. Rookie Clint Longley came into the game; before the game Redskins defensive tackle Diron Talbert had boasted the goal was to knock out Staubach “because all they’ve got left is that rookie Longley.” Longley responded when he led the Cowboys to a last-minute come-from-behind victory, throwing a 50-yard touchdown pass to Drew Pearson with 28 seconds left. The final score was Cowboys 24, Redskins 23. The Redskins were stunned. "I don't have very much to say," coach George Allen said when it was over. "It was probably the toughest loss we ever had."

December 16, 1979, Texas Stadium: The NFC East Division Championship and home field advantage on the line for both teams. This set the stage for the regular season finale against Washington; the winner would capture the NFC East title while the loser would be relegated to the second wild card (Dallas) or miss the playoffs entirely (Washington). In the game, Texas Stadium fans were treated to one of Staubach's greatest comebacks in his final regular season game. The Cowboys trailed 17–0 but then scored three touchdowns to take the lead. Led by running back John Riggins, the Redskins came back to build a 34–21 lead, but the Cowboys scored 2 touchdowns in the final five minutes — including a Staubach touchdown pass to Tony Hill with less than a minute remaining — for an amazing 35–34 victory. In the week leading up to the game, Cowboys’ defensive end Harvey Martin received a funeral wreath, supposedly sent by the Redskins. He kept it in his locker all week for motivation, and after the win, he raced into Washington's locker room, opened the door, and heaved it into the room, breaking up a team prayer.

== 1980s ==
January 22, 1983, RFK Stadium (NFC Championship): The Redskins defeated the Cowboys to earn a trip to Super Bowl XVII. Before the game, the stadium physically shook as a capacity crowd of 54,000 chanted, "We Want Dallas!" The game is best remembered for the quarterback hit by Redskins defensive end Dexter Manley that sent Cowboys' quarterback Danny White into the locker room shortly before halftime, knocking him out for the rest of the game and defensive tackle Darryl Grant's interception return for a 10-yard touchdown of a Gary Hogeboom pass tipped by Manley to score the decisive points. John Riggins rushed for 140 yards and two touchdowns on 36 carries as the Redskins defeated the Cowboys 31–17. The Redskins went on to defeat Miami for their first Super Bowl championship.

September 5, 1983, RFK Stadium: Before a sold-out season opener on Monday Night Football, the Redskins were leading the visiting Cowboys 23–3 going into halftime. Danny White's second-half comeback erased the lead, and the Cowboys took an improbable 31–30 victory. The game is also noted for Redskins rookie cornerback Darrell Green chasing down Tony Dorsett.

December 11, 1983, Texas Stadium: The second 1983 regular season meeting between the Redskins and Cowboys at Texas Stadium was more remembered for an infamous play by the Cowboys than it was for the game's outcome. On a 4th down and 1 play, Danny White was attempting to draw the Redskins offside by using hard counts, thereby giving the Cowboys a first down and keeping their drive going. But the Redskins' defense never moved, and Danny White ran a play that resulted in a loss of yards, turning the ball over to the Redskins on downs. During the replay, coach Tom Landry was simultaneously shown yelling, "No, Danny, no!" from the sidelines (undoubtedly wanting White to call a time-out to punt the ball). After the play, Landry was shown shaking his head in disgust. The Redskins went on to win, 31–10.

December 9, 1984, Texas Stadium: Down 21–6 at halftime, the Redskins scored 17 unanswered points on turnovers to take a 23–21 lead going into the fourth quarter. They came back to defeat the Cowboys, 30–28. Coupled with the 34–14 win earlier in the year, the Redskins enjoyed their first season sweep of the Cowboys in series history.

September 9, 1985, Texas Stadium: For the Monday Night Football season opener, the Cowboys secondary, nicknamed "Thurman's Thieves," intercepted Redskins quarterback Joe Theismann five times. Redskins coach Joe Gibbs would pull Theismann from the game in the fourth quarter due to his poor performance. To rub salt in the wound, fans at Texas Stadium began singing "Happy Birthday" to Theismann as he sat on the bench staring straight ahead (the game took place on Theismann's birthday). The Cowboys went on to win in a blowout, 44–14.

October 19, 1987, Texas Stadium: Dubbed by Washington fans as the "Scab Game," no team in the NFL had more players cross the picket line during the 1987 strike than the Cowboys, who were 2–0 with their veteran players entering a game with the Redskins on Monday Night Football. Washington had also won their two games during the strike but without any veterans. For this game, the Cowboys had Danny White, Randy White, Tony Dorsett, and Ed Jones, among other veterans, but were upset by the replacement Redskins players, 13–7, in a game former Washington head coach Joe Gibbs called "one of my greatest experiences and wins." The Redskins finished 3–0 with the replacements, the strike ending the following week. In 2000 Warner Bros. made a movie loosely based on the 1987 Redskins, The Replacements.

December 11, 1988, RFK Stadium The Cowboys upset the reigning Super Bowl champion Redskins, 24–17, ending any shot the Redskins had of making the playoffs. Rookie and eventual hall of fame wide receiver Michael Irvin was the big star of the game with three touchdown catches. This game would prove to be the final victory for legendary Dallas Cowboys head coach Tom Landry.

== 1990s ==
November 24, 1991, RFK Stadium: The 6–5 Cowboys handed the 11–0 Redskins their first defeat and their only defeat at home that season, 24–21. Despite the loss, the Redskins would finish 14–2 and go on to win Super Bowl XXVI. The Cowboys, motivated by the victory, would start a 6-game win streak, finishing 11–5; Cowboys owner Jerry Jones would later tell The Washington Post that he believed this victory was a key turning point in the Cowboys' transformation into the dominant team they would become during the early 1990s.

September 7, 1992, Texas Stadium: On Monday Night Football, the Cowboys, led by Emmitt Smith's 140 yards rushing, handed the defending Super Bowl champion Redskins an embarrassing 23–10 loss at Texas Stadium in their first game of the season.

December 13, 1992, RFK Stadium: The Redskins stunned the eventual Super Bowl champion Cowboys 20–17 in Washington thanks to Safety Danny Copeland's fourth-quarter recovery of a Troy Aikman/Emmitt Smith fumble in the end zone. This game would prove to be Hall of Fame Head Coach Joe Gibbs' final victory at RFK Stadium.

September 6, 1993, RFK Stadium On Monday Night Football, the Redskins gained revenge for their Week 1 Monday night loss the year before by defeating the defending Super Bowl champion Cowboys 35–16 at RFK to earn Richie Petitbon his first victory as a head coach.

December 26, 1993, Texas Stadium: The Cowboys would avenge their opening week loss by defeating the Redskins 38–3. The Cowboys' 35-point margin of victory is the largest margin of victory by either team to this point. The Cowboys would eventually close out the season with their second straight Super Bowl championship, while the Redskins would finish 4–12, their worst regular season record since 1963.

December 22, 1996, RFK Stadium: The Redskins defeated the Cowboys 37–10 in the final game played at RFK Stadium.

September 12, 1999, Jack Kent Cooke Stadium: In Week 1 of the 1999 season, the Redskins opened a 35–14 lead. Then Dallas scored three touchdowns during the final eleven minutes of regulation. The Redskins botched a last-second field goal attempt, and the game went to overtime. A play-action pass four minutes into overtime to Raghib Ismail fooled Redskins safety Matt Stevens and won the game for the visiting Cowboys.

== 2000s ==
December 22, 2002, FedExField: In the 2002 regular-season finale, Washington ended an 11-game losing streak to the Cowboys, defeating them 20–14. The win allowed Washington to finish 7–9, while Dallas finished 5–11 for the third straight year. Cowboys coach Dave Campo was fired following the 2002 season.

September 19, 2005, Texas Stadium: For this game, Emmitt Smith, Troy Aikman, and Michael Irvin were inducted into the Cowboys' "Ring of Honor" with a pre-game and halftime ceremony. Throughout a poorly played game, Dallas kept the Redskins out of the endzone and led 13–0 with less than 4 minutes left. It was at that point that the Redskins, led by quarterback Mark Brunell, took the lead thanks to two long touchdown passes to Santana Moss to win the game.

December 18, 2005, FedExField: This game was the Redskins' largest margin of victory against the Cowboys in a 35–7 blowout. The Cowboys' lone touchdown came in the fourth quarter after Washington was already ahead 35–0. The victory gave Washington its first sweep against Dallas since 1995. Dallas eventually finished 9–7, while Washington won its last two games to secure the final NFC wildcard playoff berth.

November 5, 2006, FedexField: During the fourth quarter, the game was tied 19–19 (due partly to a missed two-point conversion by the Cowboys). With 31 seconds to go, the Redskins' recently acquired kicker, Nick Novak, missed a 49-yard field goal wide right. The Cowboys then worked their way up the field to set up Mike Vanderjagt, the most accurate kicker in NFL history, for a 35-yard field goal with only seconds left. However, the kick was blocked by Troy Vincent, a safety who had been picked up by the Redskins off waivers earlier that week. The ball was scooped up by the Redskins' free safety, Sean Taylor, who ran it back to the Cowboys' 44-yard line, where the Cowboys' offensive lineman Kyle Kosier grabbed him by his facemask in an attempt to tackle him. The game would have gone into overtime had it not been for Kosier's defensive penalty, which added fifteen yards to the end of the return (by rule, an NFL game cannot end on a defensive penalty). Novak set up for a 47-yard field goal with no time left on the clock. Despite the recently missed field goal, Novak made this field goal to give the Redskins a victory.

September 8, 2008, Texas Stadium: The Redskins beat the Cowboys 26–24 in their final meeting at Texas Stadium.

November 16, 2008, FedExField: The Cowboys returned the favor of the 2005 week 1 defeat. Darrell Green and Art Monk were honored before the game for their recent induction into the Pro Football Hall of Fame. In a game that was highly touted for the return of Tony Romo, the Cowboys' defense held the Redskins to ten points while the Cowboys scored 14.

December 27, 2009, FedExField: The Cowboys shut out the Redskins 17–0. This marked the third time the Cowboys have blanked the Redskins. Washington has never shut out Dallas. 2009 would also be the 15th time the Cowboys have swept the two-game regular season series. To this point, Washington has swept the Cowboys only five times.

== 2010s ==
September 12, 2010, FedExField: Late in the fourth quarter, Tony Romo led the team down the field. With three seconds on the clock and the score 13–7, Romo made a touchdown pass to wide receiver Roy Williams that would have tied the game with a successful extra point giving the Cowboys the win. However, the touchdown was called back due to a holding penalty against Alex Barron as time expired, and Washington went on to win.

December 19, 2010, Cowboys Stadium: The Cowboys built a 20–7 lead by halftime. By the end of the third quarter, the Cowboys led 30–14. The Redskins started quarterback Rex Grossman who filled in for the recently benched Donovan McNabb, and he brought the Redskins back to tie the game 30–30 with minutes left to play. Cowboys kicker David Buehler kicked a 39-yard field goal to put Dallas up 33–30 with 50 seconds to play. Rex Grossman then drove the Redskins down the field only to be intercepted by cornerback Terrence Newman to end the game.

November 22, 2012, Cowboys Stadium: After the Redskins built a 28–3 halftime lead, Dallas quarterback Tony Romo led the Cowboys to within seven, but the Redskins held on to win, 38–31. This marked the first time the Redskins defeated the Cowboys on Thanksgiving, previously 0–5 to their rival on Thanksgiving. Robert Griffin III completed 19 of 27 passes for 304 yards and had 4 touchdown passes and 1 interception on his way to winning the Galloping Gobbler Award issued to the player deemed to have had the best performance in the game. Alfred Morris also had 113 yards rushing on 24 carries and 1 touchdown while the Redskins defense intercepted two Tony Romo passes and sacked him three times.

December 30, 2012, FedExField: In the final game of the 2012 season, the Redskins met the Cowboys on Sunday Night Football in Washington to decide the winner of the NFC East. Three interceptions by Tony Romo doomed the Cowboys. The Redskins defense, led by London Fletcher's eleven total tackles and two sacks, confused Romo all game long. The Redskins defense had three interceptions in the game with the final one being the most costly. With Dallas trailing 21–18 late in the fourth quarter from the Cowboy, Romo threw a pass to the flat intended for running back DeMarco Murray, which was intercepted by Redskins linebacker Rob Jackson. Redskins rookie running back Alfred Morris ran for 200 yards, and three touchdowns on 33 carries, the last coming with one minute left, effectively putting the game out of reach (the referee initially called a fumble and Cowboys recovery, but reversed his ruling once convinced by the side judge that, as replays would clearly show, Morris had crossed the goal line before losing the ball). The 28–18 win gave the Redskins their first NFC East title since 1999 while preventing the Cowboys from making the playoffs.

December 22, 2013, FedExField: Trying to play spoiler, the Redskins hosted the Dallas Cowboys and attempted to spoil their playoff chances. Leading 23–17 late, the Redskins looked poised to pull out the upset, but the Cowboys would score with just under a minute left and won 24–23.

September 18, 2016, FedExField: Both teams came into their Week 2 match-up in Washington having lost their season openers. Dallas started hot, getting a field goal and a touchdown run by rookie running back Ezekiel Elliott on their first two possessions to take a 10–0 lead into the 2nd quarter. The Redskins responded with a Matt Jones touchdown to make it 10–7, and both teams traded field goals to make it 13–10 at halftime. The Redskins opened the second half scoring as Kirk Cousins threw an 11-yard touchdown to Jamison Crowder. Dallas rookie quarterback Dak Prescott responded with a 6-yard touchdown run to help Dallas retake the lead at 20–17. The Redskins got two field goals to make it 23–20 and were about to make it a potential two-score game in the fourth quarter, but Cousins threw an interception in the end zone. That proved costly as Alfred Morris, the former Redskin, scored a 4-yard touchdown to make the score 27–23 for Dallas, and the Redskins failed to score on their final two possessions.

November 24, 2016, AT&T Stadium: This would be the 8th time the Cowboys and Redskins have faced off for the annual Thanksgiving Day event hosted at AT&T Stadium in Arlington, Texas. The Redskins offense led by Kirk Cousins with 449 yards (8 yards shy of a career-best) would light up the air attack against a porous Dallas secondary. However, failing to convert key drives into touchdowns, missing two field goals, a questionable onside kick attempt, and the inability to stop the Cowboys' 4th ranked offense in the 4th quarter would be too much for the Redskins to overcome. The Cowboys rolled to a then franchise-best 10th win in a row with an easy 31–26 victory. The Cowboys–Redskins rivalry was rekindled between Josh Norman and Dez Bryant as both clashed several times during the game, and both coaches were warned by referees about their antics. Immediately after the game, both players would go helmet-to-helmet while exchanging shoves and taunts. During an interview Dez Bryant added fuel to fire by saying, "Washington needs to get their money back...I honestly feel like the guy is extremely soft." 2016 would also be the 18th time the Cowboys have swept the two-game regular-season series.

October 29, 2017, FedExField: The Redskins and Cowboys entered their first matchup in 2017 both at 3–3 and behind the Eagles by 3.5 games in the division. In a rainy, washout game in Washington, the Cowboys would win 33–19 for their third straight win of the season. Ezekiel Elliott fumbled on the first play of the game, which led to a Redskins field goal and a 3–0 lead. The Cowboys answered with an Elliott touchdown to take a 7–3 lead. The Redskins came back with 10 unanswered points to take a 13–7 lead, but momentum shifted when the Cowboys blocked a Nick Rose field goal attempt and returned it inside the Redskins 10-yard line. The Cowboys then scored 19 unanswered points to take a 26–13 lead late in the fourth, with Elliott's second touchdown coming right after the blocked field goal. The Redskins would score a touchdown yet miss an extra point to make the score to 26–19 and give them a chance, but Kirk Cousins had yet another untimely turnover as he threw an interception that was returned for a touchdown with 21 seconds left to seal the Cowboys victory.

November 30, 2017, AT&T Stadium: During this game, former Redskins running back Alfred Morris rumbled for 127 yards while subbing for the suspended Ezekiel Elliott. The Redskins' hopes were all but doomed after Kirk Cousins' penchant for turnovers continued with two interceptions and a lost fumble on the day.

October 21, 2018, FedExField: The Redskins defeated the Cowboys 20–17 in Washington. In a low-scoring game that saw the two teams tied at 7–7 heading into halftime, the Redskins would take a 20–10 lead with 4:55 left in the game after Dak Prescott fumbled the ball and Preston Smith picked it up and scored a touchdown. Prescott would run in from 1 yard out to make it 20–17, and Dallas had a chance to tie the game and send it into overtime, but after a rarely-called snap infraction penalty moved Dallas back 5 yards, kicker Brett Maher missed the game-tying field goal when it hit off the left upright; given its trajectory, the kick would have likely been good from 5 yards closer. ESPN reporter Ed Werder claims an inside source told him coach Jay Gruden planted the idea in the officials' minds before the game when he told them to look at how Ladouceur moves the ball before the play. Redskins long snapper Nick Sundberg was also continuously shouting at the refs to watch out for Ladouceur's subtle movement during the game on Sunday.

November 22, 2018, AT&T Stadium: For the 9th time, the Redskins came to Dallas to play the Cowboys on Thanksgiving. Dallas had won 7 of the first 8 matchups, with history repeating itself as the Cowboys won 31–23 to move into first place in the NFC East. This game was a coming-out party for wide receiver Amari Cooper, whom Dallas recently acquired from the Oakland Raiders. He had eight receptions for 180 yards and two touchdowns, the first for 40 yards and the second for 91 yards. Dallas quarterback Dak Prescott was also very efficient with 288 passing yards, 2 passing touchdowns, and 1 rushing touchdown. Running back Ezekiel Elliott ran strong for 121 rushing yards and caught 5 passes for 22 yards in this game with a touchdown. Washington had lost their starting quarterback Alex Smith to injury the week prior so the Redskins relied upon backup Colt McCoy, who had 268 passing yards with 2 touchdowns but also threw 3 interceptions.

December 29, 2019, AT&T Stadium: In the last game of the season, Dak Prescott threw 4 touchdowns in a blowout win for Dallas. This would mark the 17th to this point that Dallas has swept the 2-game series. This was also the final game under Washington's use of the "Redskins" name. The name was dropped due to massive pressure from the team's major sponsors because of the perceived racial connotation of the branding.

== 2020s ==
October 25, 2020, FedExField: This was Washington's first win against Dallas since October 2018. The most notable play of the game came in the third quarter when Washington linebacker Jon Bostic made a dirty hit on Andy Dalton (who was starting for Dak Prescott, who was on injured reserve for the season) as he was sliding, causing Dalton to exit the game due to a head injury. Jon Bostic was immediately ejected from the game and later fined. The result of the violent blow to the head would keep Andy Dalton sidelined for three consecutive weeks.

November 26, 2020, AT&T Stadium: For the 10th time, Washington came to Dallas to play the Cowboys on Thanksgiving. Both teams entered this game with matching 3–7 records, but with a chance to take the lead in the NFC East. This time, Washington came out with the victory, 41–16, with rookie Antonio Gibson rushing for 115 yards and 3 touchdowns and Montez Sweat picking off Andy Dalton for a pick 6 to seal the win and sweep Dallas for the first time since 2012. The win moved Washington to 4–7 in first place in the NFC East. This was Washington's second win in ten Thanksgiving Day matchups with Dallas.

December 12, 2021, FedExField: Due to widely reported poor conditions of FedExField, the Cowboys brought their own sideline hot seat benches that included the Cowboys’ logo and team name. Following the game, when questioned by reporters about the Cowboys' actions, Washington Head Coach Ron Rivera responded by saying, “That’s all the gamesmanship that goes with it. It’s part of the mind games people like to play.” When questioned if he wasn't bringing Washington's own benches to Dallas, Rivera responded, "I didn't say that." For the game, a strong Cowboys defensive effort held on to win 27–20.

December 26, 2021, AT&T Stadium: As a response to the Cowboys' "gamesmanship" in the previous game, Washington shipped in their own hot seat benches with their logos to the climate-controlled AT&T stadium where the retractable roof was closed even though outdoor temperatures were in the 70s. However, the stunt backfired as the Cowboys' 56–14 win over Washington was the largest margin of victory of the rivalry. When asked about Washington bringing their own benches in a post-game news conference. DeMarcus Lawrence could only say laugh and say, "They gotta take them back with 'em don't they?"

November 24, 2024, Northwest Stadium: This game saw both teams combine for 38 points in the last 5:16 of the game in a crazy ending. Up 13–9, Cowboys QB Cooper Rush connected with Luke Schoonmaker on a 22-yard touchdown pass to make it 20–9 with 5:16 left. Two-minutes later, rookie QB Jayden Daniels would then hit Zach Ertz with a 4-yard touchdown and convert the two-point conversion to make it 20–17. On the ensuing kickoff, Cowboys returner KaVontae Turpin would botch the kick, pick the ball back up, and return the kickoff 99-yards for a touchdown to make it 27–17. After a Austin Seibert field goal made it 27–20 with 1:40 left, the Commanders got the ball back with 33 seconds left. Daniels would proceed to hit Terry McLaurin, who would go 86-yards for a touchdown to cut the lead to 27–26. However, Seibert missed the extra point that would have tied the game, and the Cowboys returned the onside kick for another touchdown to win 34–26.

== Rivalry off the field ==
- On December 19, 2005, Dallas Mavericks guard Darrell Armstrong was fined $1,000 for grabbing a microphone before a game against the Minnesota Timberwolves at the American Airlines Center and yelling "How 'bout those Redskins!" Only a few hours prior, the Cowboys had been routed by the Redskins 35–7, in the most lopsided loss of Bill Parcells's coaching career. Armstrong was raised in North Carolina as a Redskins fan.
- Dallas head coach Tom Landry appeared in a 1980s American Express television commercial in which he visits an Old West-style saloon and makes the statement, "You never know when you'll be surrounded by Redskins". Several large men dressed in Redskins uniforms encircled Landry, who addressed them with, "Howdy!" After the credit card sales pitch was read, the ad returned to the scene where Landry, as he recites the company's slogan, "Don't leave home without it", leaves the saloon and the Redskins follow him out. The saloon doors knock the Redskins backwards as they swing shut.
- After Tom Landry was fired as Cowboys coach by new Cowboys owner Jerry Jones in 1989, Landry appeared in another television commercial for Choice Hotels, in which he states that he feels so great being out of football that he might take up a new career. Landry then pulls out a guitar and sings the Waylon Jennings/Willie Nelson classic, "Mamas, don't let your babies grow up to be", and after a pause, sings, "Redskins!" In the commercial's closing tag, Landry quips, "You didn't think I would say 'Cowboys', did ya?"
- In 2017, the animosity between Cowboys wide receiver Dez Bryant and Redskins cornerback Josh Norman was part of an ad series for the Samsung Galaxy Note 8 phone. In the first ad, Norman is asked by reporters about a picture he posts on Twitter that shows Bryant's hands replaced with sticks of butter and a picture in which he says, "I'm Better Than Dez Bryant." Dez Bryant responded with his own commercial, where he says he's taking the high road when talking about Norman but draws Norman on a snail using the phone, indicating he's slow, and another drawing of the Redskins cornerback as a blanket, meaning Norman can't cover him.
- In 2022, Washington owner Dan Snyder took a swipe at Cowboys owner Jerry Jones in an attempt to deflect heat away from a long sexual harassment investigation. Per ESPN's Don Van Natta Jr., Seth Wickersham, and Tisha Thompson, multiple team owners are aware that Snyder allegedly instructed his law firms to hire investigators, with one owner reportedly being told directly by Snyder that he "has dirt on" Jones. During a radio interview, Jerry Jones denied all knowledge of the 'dirt' that Dan Snyder was referring to.

== Season-by-season results ==
Dallas Cowboys vs. Washington Redskins/Football Team/Commanders Season-by-Season Results
1960s (Cowboys, 10–7–2)

Season	Season series	at Dallas Cowboys	at Washington Redskins	Overall series	Notes
1960	Redskins 1–0	no game	Redskins; 26–14	Redskins; 1–0	Cowboys join the National Football League (NFL) as an expansion team. They are placed in the NFL Western Conference. Redskins' win was their only win in their 1960 season.
1961	Redskins 1–0–1	Tie; 28–28	Redskins; 34–24	Redskins; 2–0–1	Cowboys are moved to the NFL Eastern Conference with the addition of the Minnesota Vikings to the NFL, resulting in two annual meetings with the Redskins. Redskins open D.C. Stadium (now known as Robert F. Kennedy Memorial Stadium). Redskins' tie and win result against the Cowboys were the only results that weren't losses in their 1961 season.
1962	Cowboys 1–0–1	Tie; 35–35	Cowboys; 38–10	Redskins; 2–1–2	
1963	Tie 1–1	Cowboys; 35–20	Redskins; 21–17	Redskins; 3–2–2	
1964	Tie 1–1	Cowboys; 24–18	Redskins; 28–16	Redskins; 4–3–2	
1965	Tie 1–1	Cowboys; 27–7	Redskins; 34–31	Redskins; 5–4–2	In Washington, Redskins overcame a 21–0 deficit. The 21-point comeback set a new Redskins franchise record for largest comeback (broken in 2015) and the 21-point blown lead set a new Cowboys franchise record for largest blown lead (broken in 2011).
1966	Tie 1–1	Redskins; 34–31	Cowboys; 31–30	Redskins; 6–5–2	Cowboys lose 1966 NFL Championship.
1967	Tie 1–1	Redskins; 27–20	Cowboys; 17–14	Redskins; 7–6–2	As a result of expansion, the two eight-team divisions became two eight-team conferences split into two divisions, with the Cowboys and Redskins placed in the NFL Capitol division. Cowboys lose 1967 NFL Championship.
1968	Cowboys 2–0	Cowboys; 29–20	Cowboys; 44–24	Cowboys; 8–7–2	Game in Dallas was played on Thanksgiving Day.
1969	Cowboys 2–0	Cowboys; 20–10	Cowboys; 41–28	Cowboys; 10–7–2	

1970s (Cowboys, 12–9)

Season	Season series	at Dallas Cowboys	at Washington Redskins	Overall series	Notes
1970	Cowboys 2–0	Cowboys; 34–0	Cowboys; 45–21	Cowboys; 12–7–2	As a result of the AFL–NFL merger, the Cowboys and Redskins are placed in the National Football Conference (NFC) and the NFC East. Cowboys lose Super Bowl V.
1971	Tie 1–1	Redskins; 20-16	Cowboys; 13-0	Cowboys; 13–8–2	Cowboys open Texas Stadium midway through the season. Redskins' win is the Cowboys' only home loss in the 1971 season. Cowboys win Super Bowl VI.
1972	Tie 1–1	Cowboys; 34–24	Redskins; 24–20	Cowboys; 14–9–2	First game of series at Texas Stadium.
1972 playoffs	Redskins 1–0		Redskins; 26–3	Cowboys; 14–10–2	NFC Championship Game. Redskins go on to lose Super Bowl VII.
1973	Tie 1–1	Cowboys; 27–7	Redskins; 14–7	Cowboys; 15–11–2	Both teams finished with 10–4 records, but the Cowboys clinched the NFC East based on a better point differential in their head-to-head games.
1974	Tie 1–1	Cowboys; 24–23	Redskins; 28–21	Cowboys; 16–12–2	Game in Dallas was played on Thanksgiving Day, which saw the Cowboys win on a last-minute 50-yard touchdown pass.
1975	Tie 1–1	Cowboys; 31–10	Redskins; 30–24 (OT)	Cowboys; 17–13–2	Cowboys lose Super Bowl X.
1976	Tie 1–1	Redskins; 27–14	Cowboys; 20–7	Cowboys; 18–14–2	
1977	Cowboys 2–0	Cowboys; 34–16	Cowboys; 14–7	Cowboys; 20–14–2	Cowboys win Super Bowl XII.
1978	Tie 1–1	Cowboys; 37–10	Redskins; 9–5	Cowboys; 21–15–2	Cowboys lose Super Bowl XIII. Game in Dallas was played on Thanksgiving Day.
1979	Tie 1–1	Cowboys; 35–34	Redskins; 34–20	Cowboys; 22–16–2	In Dallas, Cowboys overcame a 17–0 deficit as they clinched the NFC East and eliminated the Redskins from playoff contention with their win.

1980s (Cowboys, 11–9)

Season	Season series	at Dallas Cowboys	at Washington Redskins	Overall series	Notes
1980	Cowboys 2–0	Cowboys; 14–10	Cowboys; 17–3	Cowboys; 24–16–2	
1981	Cowboys 2–0	Cowboys; 24–10	Cowboys; 26–10	Cowboys; 26–16–2	
1982	Cowboys 1–0	canceled	Cowboys; 24–10	Cowboys; 27–16–2	Due to the 1982 NFL player strike, the game scheduled in Dallas was canceled. Cowboys' win was the Redskins' only loss in their 1982 season.
1982 playoffs	Redskins 1–0		Redskins; 31–17	Cowboys; 27–17–2	NFC Championship Game. Redskins go on to win Super Bowl XVII.
1983	Tie 1–1	Redskins; 31–10	Cowboys; 31–30	Cowboys; 28–18–2	In Washington, Cowboys overcame a 23–3 second half deficit. Redskins prevented the Cowboys from clinching the NFC East and home-field advantage in the playoffs with their win, and would later claim it themselves the following week. Cowboys' win was the Redskins' only home loss in the 1983 season. Redskins lose Super Bowl XVIII.
1984	Redskins 2–0	Redskins; 30–28	Redskins; 34–14	Cowboys; 28–20–2	In Dallas, Redskins overcame a 21–6 second half deficit. Redskins record their first season series sweep against the Cowboys.
1985	Cowboys 2–0	Cowboys; 44–14	Cowboys; 13–7	Cowboys; 30–20–2	In the Dallas home game, Cowboys intercept Redskins' quarterback Joe Theismann five times. Both teams finished with 10–6 records, but the Cowboys clinched the NFC East based on their head-to-head sweep, eliminating the Redskins from playoff contention.
1986	Tie 1–1	Cowboys; 30–6	Redskins; 41–14	Cowboys; 31–21–2	In Washington, Redskins/Commanders score their most points in a game against the Cowboys.
1987	Redskins 2–0	Redskins; 13–7	Redskins; 24–20	Cowboys; 31–23–2	In Dallas, the Redskins defeated the Cowboys despite fielding a roster composed largely of replacement players due to the 1987 NFL players’ strike. Redskins win Super Bowl XXII.
1988	Tie 1–1	Redskins; 35–17	Cowboys; 24–17	Cowboys; 32–24–2	Starting with their loss to the Redskins, Cowboys go on a 14-game home losing streak. Cowboys' win snapped their 10-game losing streak.
1989	Tie 1–1	Redskins; 30–7	Cowboys; 13–3	Cowboys; 33–25–2	Cowboys' win in Washington was their only win in their 1989 season.

1990s (Cowboys, 12–8)

Season	Season series	at Dallas Cowboys	at Washington Redskins	Overall series	Notes
1990	Tie 1–1	Cowboys; 27–17	Redskins; 19–15	Cowboys; 34–26–2	Game in Dallas was played on Thanksgiving Day.
1991	Tie 1–1	Redskins; 33–31	Cowboys; 24–21	Cowboys; 35–27–2	Cowboys' win handed the Redskins their first loss of the season after an 11–0 start and was the Redskins' only home loss of the 1991 season. Redskins win Super Bowl XXVI.
1992	Tie 1–1	Cowboys; 23–10	Redskins; 20–17	Cowboys; 36–28–2	Cowboys win Super Bowl XXVII.
1993	Tie 1–1	Cowboys; 38–3	Redskins; 35–16	Cowboys; 37–29–2	Cowboys win Super Bowl XXVIII.
1994	Cowboys 2–0	Cowboys; 31–7	Cowboys; 34–7	Cowboys; 39–29–2	
1995	Redskins 2–0	Redskins; 24–17	Redskins; 27–23	Cowboys; 39–31–2	Cowboys win Super Bowl XXX.
1996	Tie 1–1	Cowboys; 21–10	Redskins; 37–10	Cowboys; 40–32–2	Game in Dallas was played on Thanksgiving Day.
1997	Tie 1–1	Cowboys; 17–14	Redskins; 21–16	Cowboys; 41–33–2	Redskins open Jack Kent Cooke Stadium (now known as Northwest Stadium).
1998	Cowboys 2–0	Cowboys; 23–7	Cowboys; 31–10	Cowboys; 43–33–2	
1999	Cowboys 2–0	Cowboys; 38–20	Cowboys; 41–35 (OT)	Cowboys; 45–33–2	In Washington, Cowboys overcame a 35–14 fourth quarter deficit. The 21-point comeback tied the Cowboys’ franchise record for the largest comeback.

2000s (Cowboys, 14–6)

Season	Season series	at Dallas Cowboys	at Washington Redskins	Overall series	Notes
2000	Cowboys 2–0	Cowboys; 32–13	Cowboys; 27–21	Cowboys; 47–33–2	
2001	Cowboys 2–0	Cowboys; 9–7	Cowboys; 20–14	Cowboys; 49–33–2	
2002	Tie 1–1	Cowboys; 27–20	Redskins; 20–14	Cowboys; 50–34–2	Cowboys win 10 straight meetings (1997–2002). Game in Dallas was played on Thanksgiving Day.
2003	Cowboys 2–0	Cowboys; 21–14	Cowboys; 27–0	Cowboys; 52–34–2	
2004	Cowboys 2–0	Cowboys; 13–10	Cowboys; 21–18	Cowboys; 54–34–2	Cowboys win nine straight home meetings (1996–2004).
2005	Redskins 2–0	Redskins; 14–13	Redskins; 35–7	Cowboys; 54–36–2	In Dallas, Redskins overcame a 13–0 fourth quarter deficit. In Washington, Redskins/Commanders record their largest victory against the Cowboys with a 28–point differential.
2006	Tie 1–1	Cowboys; 27–10	Redskins; 22–19	Cowboys; 55–37–2	
2007	Tie 1–1	Cowboys; 28–23	Redskins; 27–6	Cowboys; 56–38–2	
2008	Tie 1–1	Redskins; 26–24	Cowboys; 14–10	Cowboys; 57–39–2	
2009	Cowboys 2–0	Cowboys; 7–6	Cowboys; 17–0	Cowboys; 59–39–2	Cowboys open Cowboys Stadium (now known as AT&T Stadium). In Washington, Cowboys clinched a playoff berth with their win.

2010s (Cowboys, 14–6)

Season	Season series	at Dallas Cowboys	at Washington Redskins	Overall series	Notes
2010	Tie 1–1	Cowboys; 33–30	Redskins; 13–7	Cowboys; 60–40–2	
2011	Cowboys 2–0	Cowboys; 18–16	Cowboys; 27–24 (OT)	Cowboys; 62–40–2	
2012	Redskins 2–0	Redskins; 38–31	Redskins; 28–18	Cowboys; 62–42–2	Game in Dallas was played on Thanksgiving Day. In Washington, Redskins clinched the NFC East and eliminated the Cowboys from playoff contention with their win.
2013	Cowboys 2–0	Cowboys; 31–16	Cowboys; 24–23	Cowboys; 64–42–2	
2014	Tie 1–1	Redskins; 20–17 (OT)	Cowboys; 44–17	Cowboys; 65–43–2	
2015	Tie 1–1	Redskins; 34–23	Cowboys; 19–16	Cowboys; 66–44–2	
2016	Cowboys 2–0	Cowboys; 31–26	Cowboys; 27–23	Cowboys; 68–44–2	Game in Dallas was played on Thanksgiving Day, and a brawl occurred between Cowboys' wide receiver Dez Bryant and Redskins' cornerback Josh Norman.
2017	Cowboys 2–0	Cowboys; 38–14	Cowboys; 33–19	Cowboys; 70–44–2	
2018	Tie 1–1	Cowboys; 31–23	Redskins; 20–17	Cowboys; 71–45–2	Game in Dallas was played on Thanksgiving Day.
2019	Cowboys 2–0	Cowboys; 47–16	Cowboys; 31–21	Cowboys; 73–45–2	Game in Dallas was the final game for Washington as the "Redskins".

2020s (Cowboys, 9–4)

Season	Season series	at Dallas Cowboys	at Washington Football Team/Commanders	Overall series	Notes
2020	Washington 2–0	Washington; 41–16	Washington; 25–3	Cowboys; 73–47–2	After decades of controversy, Washington retired the "Redskins" name and temporarily adopted the title "Washington Football Team". In Washington, Washington's linebacker Jon Bostic delivered a violent hit on Cowboys' quarterback Andy Dalton, resulting in Dalton being sidelined for three weeks. Bostic was ejected from the game and later faced a fine. Dallas home game was played on Thanksgiving Day. In this game, Washington tied their most points scored in a game against the Cowboys (1986).
2021	Cowboys 2–0	Cowboys; 56–14	Cowboys; 27–20	Cowboys; 75–47–2	In the Dallas home game, the Cowboys record their largest victory against the Commanders with a 42–point differential and scored their most points in a game against the Commanders. Cowboys' quarterback Dak Prescott became the first player to throw touchdown passes to a wide receiver, running back, offensive lineman, and tight end.
2022	Tie 1–1	Cowboys; 25–10	Commanders; 26–6	Cowboys; 76–48–2	Washington Football Team adopts the "Commanders" name.
2023	Cowboys 2–0	Cowboys; 45–10	Cowboys; 38–10	Cowboys; 78–48–2	Game in Dallas was played on Thanksgiving. In Washington, Dallas clinched the NFC East with their win.
2024	Tie 1–1	Commanders; 23–19	Cowboys; 34–26	Cowboys; 79–49–2	Commanders draft QB Jayden Daniels.
2025	Cowboys 2–0	Cowboys; 44–22	Cowboys; 30–23	Cowboys; 81–49–2	Game in Washington was played on Christmas.
2026	Cowboys 1–0	Cowboys; 37–20	January 9/10	Cowboys; 82–49–2	

Summary of Results

Season	Season series	at Dallas Cowboys	at Washington Redskins/Football Team/Commanders	Notes
Regular season	Cowboys 82–47–2	Cowboys 45–18–2	Cowboys 37–29	
Postseason	Commanders 2–0	no games	Commanders 2–0	NFC Championship: 1972, 1982
Regular and postseason	Cowboys 82–49–2	Cowboys 45–18–2	Cowboys 37–31	

== Individual leaders ==
Note: Sorted by yards, regular season only. Bold denotes active player.

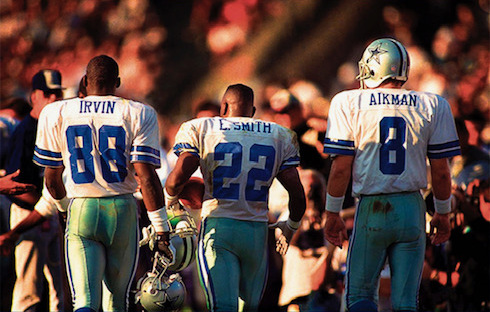
Michael Irvin is tied for the most receiving touchdowns, Emmitt Smith has the most rushing touchdowns, and Troy Aikman has the third most passing touchdowns.

=== Passing ===
Name	Team	GP	W-L	CMP%	Yds	TD	Int
Tony Romo	DAL	20	11-9	61.9	3,997	27	16
Sonny Jurgensen	WAS	19	7-12	57.8	3,761	27	17
Troy Aikman	DAL	20	12-8	59.8	3,741	23	16
**Dak Prescott**	**DAL**	**15**	**13-2**	**65.8**	**3,716**	**32**	**5**
Joe Theismann	WAS	23	8-15	52.2	3,194	20	23

=== Rushing ===
Name	Team	GP	Att	Yds	TD
Emmitt Smith	DAL	24	528	2,440	23
Tony Dorsett	DAL	20	356	1,340	6
John Riggins	WAS	16	253	1,059	9
Ezekiel Elliott	DAL	15	235	958	9
Don Perkins	DAL	14	216	879	7

=== Receiving ===
Name	Team	GP	Rec	Yds	TD
Jason Witten	DAL	32	137	1,495	10
Charley Taylor	WAS	23	95	1,463	13
Michael Irvin	DAL	20	96	1,427	13
Tony Hill	DAL	19	76	1,355	4
Art Monk	WAS	24	94	1,334	3

== Connections between the teams ==
=== Players ===
Name	Position(s)	Commanders' tenure	Cowboys' tenure
Eddie LeBaron	Quarterback	1952–1953, 1955–1959	1960–1963
Noah Brown	Wide receiver	2024–2025	2017–2022
Ray Schoenke	Tackle	1966–1975	1963–1964
Alfred Morris	Running back	2012–2015	2016–2017, 2019*
Tyler Biadasz	Center	2024–2025	2020–2023
Deion Sanders	Defensive back	2000	1995–1999
John Wilbur	Guard	1971–1974	1966–1969
Mark Sanchez	Quarterback	2018	2017
Michael Gallup	Wide receiver	2025	2018–2023
Randall Godfrey	Linebacker	2007	1996–1999
Eddie Murray	Placekicker	1995, 2000	1993, 1999
Dante Fowler	Defensive end	2024	2022–2023, 2025
Sam Baker	Kicker/punter/fullback	1953, 1956–1959	1962–1963
Dorance Armstrong	Defensive end	2024–present	2018–2023
Derrick Dockery	Guard	2003–2006, 2009–2010	2011–2012
Jean Fugett	Tight end	1976–1979	1972–1975
Jeremy Sprinkle	Tight end	2017–2020	2021
Noah Igbinoghene	Cornerback	2024–2025	2023

== See also ==
- List of NFL rivalries
- NFC East
