= Go! You Packers Go! =

Fight song for the Green Bay Packers

Song by the Lumberjack Band
- Released: 1931
- Genre: Fight song
- Songwriter: Eric Karll

"Go! You Packers Go!" is the fight song for the Green Bay Packers, an American football team in the National Football League (NFL). The song was written by Eric Karll, a commercial jingle writer in Milwaukee, Wisconsin, and was first performed in 1931 by the Lumberjack Band, a marching band that performed during Packers games. It was one of the first fight songs for a professional American football team.

Originally performed live, the song has been recorded numerous times. In 1992, a taped version of the Lumberjack Band performing the song replaced live performances and has been played at various moments during games. In the early 2000s, the song was played after each Packers touchdown and has been recorded multiple times by different performers.

== History ==
In 1930, Eric Karll (sometimes written as Erich), a well-known songwriter and commercial jingle writer in Milwaukee, Wisconsin, wrote the words of a fight song for the Green Bay Packers, an American football team in the NFL. He would go on to write another well-known song, "Welcome Mr. Roosevelt", which was used on Franklin D. Roosevelt's campaign trail. Karll copyrighted the words to the Packers song the same year he wrote them and began working with local musicians to compose sheet music for it. One day, he showed up at studios of WHBY, a local radio station in the Green Bay-area and with Billy Burt, who was well-known in the Green Bay theater and radio scene, composed the music. The song was first performed live in 1931 by the Lumberjack Band, which at the time was a volunteer group who would play during Packer games. When the Packers took control of the band in 1939, the music was reworked to better match the instruments and performers in the band. In 1941, Karll sued a publishing company for copyright infringement after they published the chorus of the song, although the case was dismissed after the judge declared that the dedication of the song to the Packers implied an understanding that it could be used under fair use.

In 1953, the Packers purchased the rights to the lyrics of the song and began selling souvenir sheet music to fans. Packers historian Lee Remmel noted in a column in 2005 that Lawrence Welk, known as the "Music Man", owned the rights to the first recording of the song and was a paid a royalty every time it was played. According to the Green Bay Press-Gazette, the Lumberjack Band obtained the rights to the recording and assigned them to the Bibo Publishing Company. Band leader Wilner Burke let the copyright lapse in 1959, claiming he never received a notice from the government copyright office offering a renewal. Welk's organization bought out the publishing company and obtained the rights to the song recording, receiving a small royalty every time it was played. The Press-Gazette noted that the song lyrics would enter into the public domain in 1970. In 1960, the NFL Marching Band recorded the song as part of the NFL Marching Songs album (issued on the RCA label), which included an intro by Bart Starr. Remmel also noted that the version played during Packers games at the time had been recorded in 1992. It has been released by different artists multiple times, including in 2011 and 2016. The song's original lyrics included the line "On, you Blue and Gold, to glory," which reflected the original colors of the Packers, which are now green and gold.

A separate song by a rock band called The Wizenhiemers with a similar title, "Go You Packers Go", was released in 1996 but does not share the same lyrics.

== Legacy ==
"Go! You Packers Go!" was one of the earliest fight songs for a professional American football team. Throughout the history of the Packers, the song has been played during player introductions, after extra points, and after touchdowns. More recently, the song has been played by the "Packers Tailgaters", small musical groups who perform in Lambeau Field's parking lot before games. The song is also related to the chant "Go Pack Go!", which is often played during games and chanted by fans. In 2001, a local artist produced a limited edition print of the song that honored its 70th anniversary and highlighted the 80 years of team history. The song has been played in the Green Bay Packers Hall of Fame.

== See also ==
- "Bang the Drum All Day" – 1983 song played after the Green Bay Packers score a touchdown
