= Hail to the Commanders =

Fight song of the NFL's Washington Commanders

Song
- Written: 1937
- Genre: Fight song
- Composer: Barnee Breeskin
- Lyricist: Corinne Griffith
- Formerly known as "Hail to the Redskins"

"Hail to the Commanders" is the fight song of the Washington Commanders, an American football team belonging to the National Football League (NFL). At home games, the song is performed by the Washington Commanders Marching Band when the team scores a touchdown.

The music was composed in 1937 by Barnee Breeskin with lyrics written by Corinne Griffith, the wife of franchise founder George Preston Marshall. The musical arrangement and lyrics have since gone through various revisions. The song was known as "Hail to the Redskins" until the retirement of the Redskins branding in 2020.

== History ==
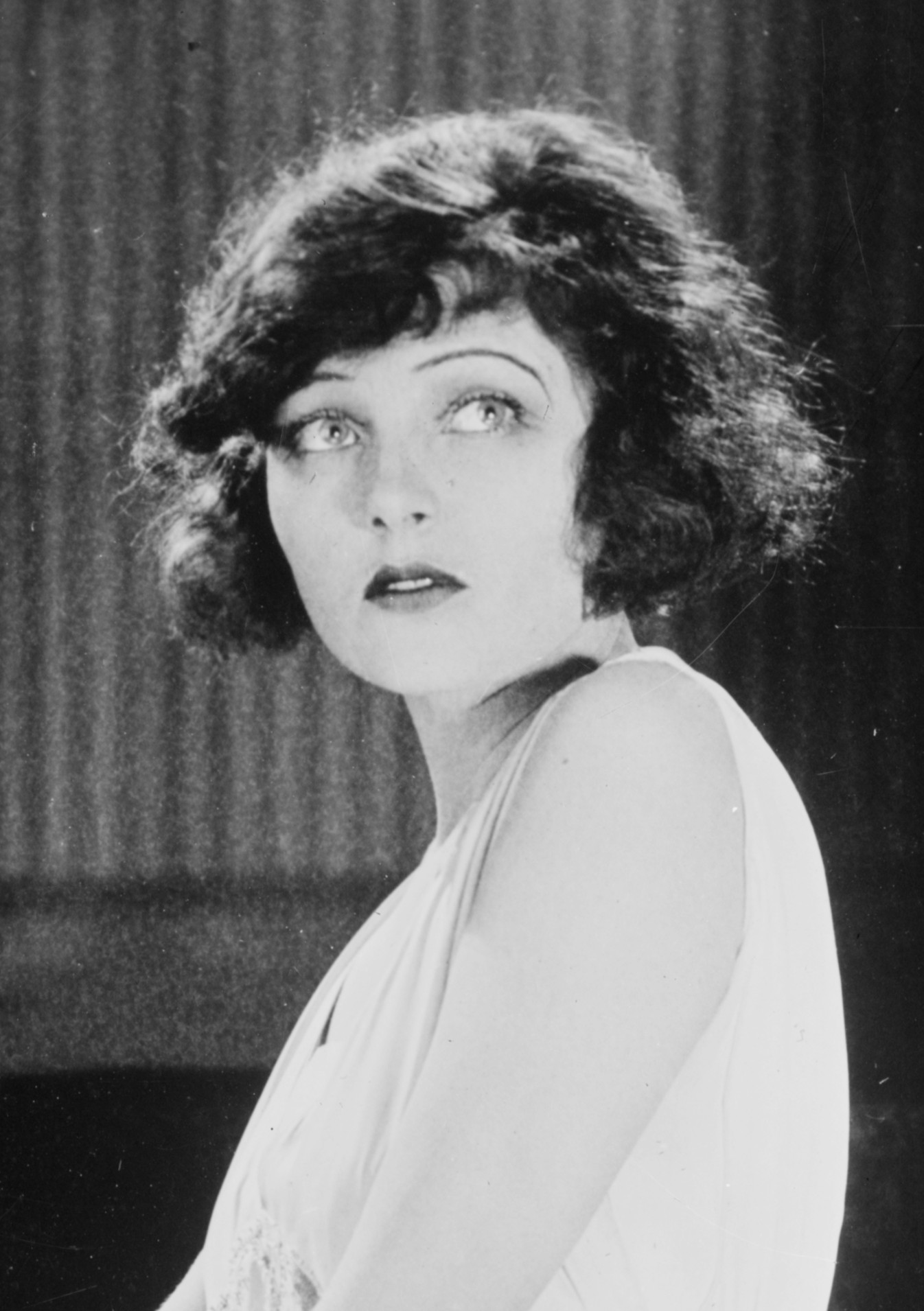
Hollywood film star Corinne Griffith, wife of franchise founder George Preston Marshall, wrote the original lyrics to "Hail to the Redskins"

In 1937, Marshall moved the team from Boston to Washington, D.C. With this move and the introduction of his team to the nation's capital, Marshall commissioned a 110-member marching band to provide the new fans with the "pomp and circumstance" and "pageantry" of a public victory parade. Marshall said he wanted his team and their games to emulate the spectacle of gladiators at the Colosseum. He also wanted to incorporate elements of the college football experience into the pro game. He outfitted the band with $25,000 ($559,896 in 2025) of uniforms and instruments and asked the band leader, Barnee Breeskin, to compose a fight song worthy of such a team of gladiators and warriors.

The original lyrics were written by Marshall's wife Corinne Griffith to reflect the Native American warrior imagery of the team as the "Redskins". The lyrics were later reworked to be less offensive to contemporary sensibilities, although the Redskins name became increasingly criticized as a racial slur. Washington began playing the song at home games for the 1938 season. "Hail to the Redskins" is the second oldest fight song for a professional American football team; the oldest fight song is "Go! You Packers! Go!", composed in 1931 for the Green Bay Packers.

The original fight song lyrics are as follows:

Hail to the Redskins! Hail Vic-to-ry!
Braves on the warpath, Fight for old D.C.
Scalp 'em, Swamp 'em, We will take-em big score!
Read 'em, Weep 'em, Touchdown—we want heap more!
Fight on, Fight on till you have won,
Sons of Wash-ing-ton (Rah! Rah! Rah!)
Hail to the Redskins! Hail Vic-to-ry!
Braves on the warpath, Fight! For old D.C.

=== Dallas Cowboys incident ===
When the NFL began considering expansion to Texas, Marshall strongly opposed the move, as it would end his three-decade monopoly on pro football in the South. In 1958, potential owner Clint Murchison, who was trying to bring the NFL to Dallas, bought the rights to "Hail to the Redskins" from a disgruntled Breeskin and threatened to prevent Marshall from playing it at games. Marshall agreed to back Murchison's bid, Murchison gave him back the rights to the song, and the Dallas Cowboys were founded. Marshall immediately revised the lyrics, changing "Fight for old D.C." to "Fight for old Dixie" in an attempt to retain the South as exclusive fans of the Washington Redskins.

=== Revisions ===
The 1959 replacement of "D.C" with "Dixie" marked the song's first revision. The song's original first stanza had evolved into the line "Fight for old Dixie", while earlier arrangements of the song closed to the opening of the Southern folk song "Dixie" played as a countermelody. By 1963, the lyrics were changed from Dixie back to the original "D.C.", evidenced by a 1963 Media Guide.

The Redskins played south of the Mason–Dixon line, and as there were no established NFL teams in the region until the 1960s, Marshall aggressively marketed his franchise as "Team of the South". He would recruit players from Southern schools, refuse to employ black players (until 1962), feature Southern bands at halftime, and sign contracts to feature the team on Southern radio networks and television networks.

In July 1965, a black Washington fan wrote to the owner of the team, describing the racial unrest that "Dixie" caused and asking for it to be stopped. According to an article in The Washington Afro-American of October 23, 1965, "Dixie" was no longer played as a countermelody that year.

In 1972, the lyrics were altered after representatives of Native American groups raised concerns about lines that referred to the practice of scalping and used non-standard grammar in a stereotype of Native American speech.

Team president Edward Bennett Williams met with a delegation of Native Americans representatives, including Dennis Banks from the American Indian Movement; LaDonna Harris, president of Americans for Indian Opportunity; and Leon Cole, president of the National Congress of American Indians. They asked him to replace the team nickname, retire the female "Redskinette" dancers in pseudo-native dress, and change the lyrics to the fight song.

Williams listened to their concerns, but in the end he only changed the song lyrics, saying, "The 'swamp 'ems,' 'scalp 'ems,' and 'heap 'ems' is a mockery of dialect. We won’t use those lyrics anymore."

The modified third and fourth lines were:

Run or pass and score, We want a lot more!
Beat 'em, swamp 'em, Touchdown—let the points soar!

Playing of "Hail to the Redskins!" was halted at home games in 2020 and 2021 when the franchise abandoned its controversial team logo. The song was restored upon the Commanders rebranding in 2022, with the phrase "Braves on the Warpath" replaced by "Fight for our Commanders" via an online fan vote, and "Sons of Washington" replaced by the gender-neutral "All of Washington". It was revised again in 2026, returning to the original second line. The current lyrics are as follows:

Hail to the Commanders! Hail Victory!
Braves on the Warpath! Fight for Old DC!
Run or pass and score, we want a lot more!
Beat 'em, Swamp 'em, Touchdown! Let the points soar!
Fight on! Fight on! Til you have won!
All of Washington! Rah! Rah! Rah!
Hail to the Commanders! Hail Victory!
Braves on the Warpath! Fight for Old DC!

== Other usage ==
The LG Twins of the Korea Baseball Organization use the song's melody in their own fight song.
