= Wilner Burke =

American band director

- Burke in 1975
- Born: May 12, 1908; Green Bay, Wisconsin, U.S.
- Died: June 14, 1985 (aged 77); Green Bay, Wisconsin, U.S.
- Occupation: Band director
- Known for: Band director, Lumberjack Band

Wilner Edward Burke (May 12, 1908 – June 14, 1985) was an American band director known for leading the Lumberjack Band, the team band for the Green Bay Packers. Burke, a native of Green Bay, Wisconsin, served as an alderman for the city for 21 years and served on the county board. However, he became known for his relationship with the Packers. Starting in 1939, he was put in charge of the Packers team band, which he had been part of since the early 1920s. From 1939 to 1981, Burke served as the band director and also coordinated all half-time entertainment. The band, which changed its name to the Green Bay Packers Band, played across the state at parades and other special events. Burke retired prior to the 1982 NFL season and died three years later, at the age of 77.

== Early life ==
Wilner Burke was born on May 12, 1908, in Green Bay, Wisconsin. Burke was an early supporter of the Green Bay Packers in the 1930s, playing the saxophone for a makeshift band that attended home games in lumberjack clothing.

== Career ==
=== Politics and business ===
From 1950 to 1971, Burke was an alderman for the Fifth Ward of the city of Green Bay. When he was first elected, in 1950, he was the only candidate to win who was not an incumbent. He also served on the County board. From the business side, he had an association with Schneider Allied Van Lines for 24 years, from 1952 to 1976.

=== Band director ===
As early as 1921, an unorganized group of fans attended games in lumberjack clothing and played musical instruments to show support for the Packers. The official Lumberjack Band was formed in 1938 and the Packers then took control of the band in 1939. Burke was first named the band's business manager and then the band director in 1939. Burke would continue in this role until retiring in 1982. During his time as band director, the Lumberjack Band became well-known, with head coach Vince Lombardi calling it "the best playing band in the National Football League". Lombardi made one change during Burke's tenure; he asked that the name of the band be changed to the Green Bay Packer Band to dispel the myth that everything north of Milwaukee, Wisconsin, is related to logging. In addition to playing at Packers home games, the band also played at special events, parades and rallies throughout Wisconsin. Burke not only led the band, but also took on the additional responsibility of organizing the half-time entertainment for the Packers. In 1966, Burke became the chairman of the National Football League's half-time directors. Lovell Ives, who played under Burke for 13 years and became band director after the latter's retirement, noted that Burke was "a wonderful director" and that "he ran the band with a great deal of care". Burke was inducted into the Green Bay Packers Hall of Fame in 1986 in recognition of his contributions to the team.

== Personal life ==
Burke was married to Mabel Burke (née Krchma) and they had two daughters. He was an active member of the community, serving on the Bishops Charity Committee for 24 years. He was also a member of the local Elks Club and Knights of Columbus. Burke died on June 14, 1985, at the age of 77.
