= Washington Commanders Marching Band =

Official marching band for the Washington Commanders

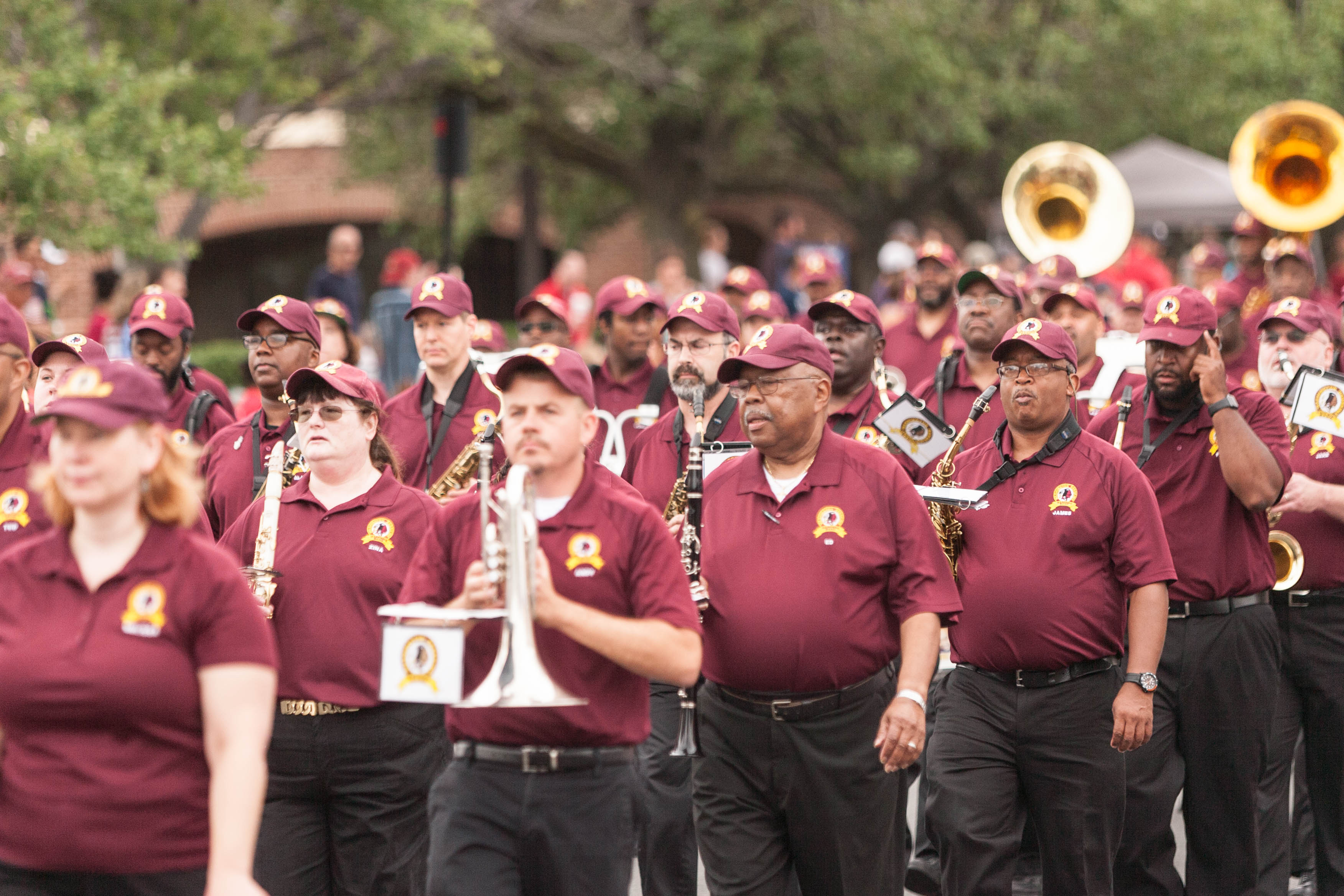
- The team marching band in 2016
- Established: 1937; 89 years ago
- Members: 60
- Director: Jeffrey Sean Dokken
- Affiliations: Washington Commanders
- Website: www.commanders.com/stadium/marching-band-2023

The Washington Commanders Marching Band is the marching band for the Washington Commanders of the National Football League (NFL). It is the league's oldest marching band.

The group was established in September 1937 by a local milk company and quickly embraced by team owner George Preston Marshall as The Redskins Marching Band.

After a two-year hiatus during the COVID-19 pandemic and Redskins naming controversy, the band was reformed with its current name in 2022.

== History ==
=== Establishment ===
The 110-piece Washington Redskins Band as it appeared in 1952, replete with over-the-top feathered war bonnets.

In the middle of August 1937, a volunteer band was assembled in an old firehouse at in Mount Rainier, Maryland. The nucleus of the band had played together previously under the auspices of a large local dairy company. After speeches were given, a new fight song called "Hail to the Redskins!", with music by Barnee Breeskin and lyrics by Corinne Griffith, Hollywood actress and wife of team owner Marshall, was taught to the assemblage — who had to be persuaded that the new tune was superior to "Onward, Christian Soldiers," a tune which the band already knew and preferred.

The Redskins Marching Band was born. In the team's words, "For the rest of the season these musical milkmen played to their hearts' content — and to the fans' delight." The entertainment experiment was a success and team owner George Preston Marshall embraced the marchers as "The Redskins Band." Twenty thousand dollars were invested in elaborate band uniforms, including gaudy Indian headdresses in lieu of more typical band headgear.

The Redskins Band also played short musical arrangements during timeout, carefully timed to the 90-seconds allowed for such stoppages. Some 200 short musical scores were compiled by band officials during the group's first decade of existence. The original fight song — with some modification of the lyrics over time to better accord with modern political sensibilities — would remain the signature song of the band, played at halftime and after touchdowns are scored.

According to the team, the band was "composed of volunteers of all sizes and ages — printers, plumbers, sheet metal workers; mechanics, painters, electrical engineers; students, bookbinders, and, oh, yes, of course, even musicians." This official statement of amateurism understated the group's core of musical competence, however, with direction as of 1943 in the firm hand of Don P. McAdoo, former director of the Akron Symphony Orchestra.

In addition to playing home games, the Redskins band sometimes went on the road with the team, entertaining at games in Pittsburgh, Boston, Baltimore, Cleveland, and New York, among other locations. The band also marched in parades and played occasional special events.

Beginning in 1962, a chorus line of women bedecked in what was represented as Native American garb were added to the on-field marching lineup of the Redskins band.

=== The Super Bowl era ===
Although the wildly stereotypical headgear was lost along the way, the Redskins Marching Band was maintained continuously into the Super Bowl era. By 2010 the band had grown from its original 110-member size to 126 pieces. Although unpaid, some compensation was provided as band members were allotted two tickets to each home game — which they were free to give to family members or sell at their pleasure. Turnover was small and aspiring members eager, with about 25 applicants each season for the average of 5 or 6 openings in the band.

Regular rehearsals were held during the week, with the band playing before home games outside the stadium and giving impromptu concerts or drum shows following victories.

New music was constantly added to the bands repertoire, with an emphasis placed upon "music that will, in our opinion, excite people — rouse them up to cheer for the team," according to 2010 band director Eric M. Summers. "A lot of them are oldies that most of the audience will recognize — those pieces that you will be able to sing some of the words to," Summers said.

Marching performances during halftime was greatly reduced in the later phases of the Washington Redskins band, with only two or three shows a season given as of 2010.

=== After the hiatus ===
The band went inactive in 2020, during the season with fan attendance shut down by the COVID-19 epidemic and another in which the Redskins naming controversy added a demoralizing factor, but returned in 2022 after the team rebranded as the Commanders. New uniforms were unveiled for the band, slimmed down to a 60-member size for its latest iteration. Band members are paid part-time employees of the team under the current model.

The Commanders band continues to perform the team fight song, renamed "Hail to the Commanders", after the team scores touchdowns at home games.

Jeffrey Sean Dokken, conductor of the Symphony Orchestra of Northern Virginia, was named the first director of the reborn Washington Commanders Marching Band.

== See also ==
- Baltimore's Marching Ravens
