= Baltimore's Marching Ravens =

Official marching band of the Baltimore Ravens

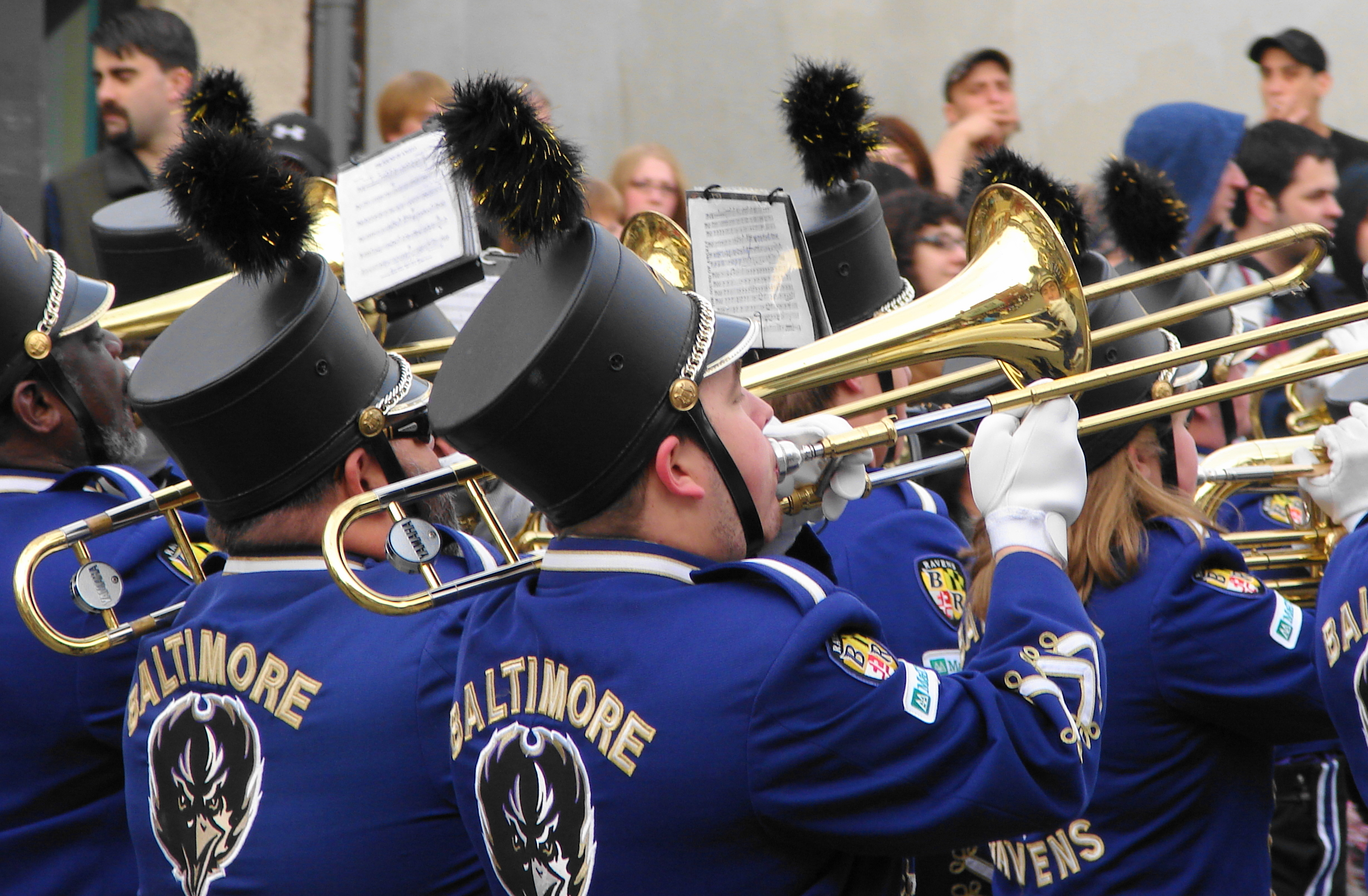
Baltimore's Marching Ravens at the Hampden Christmas Parade in December 2006.

Baltimore's Marching Ravens are the official marching band of the Baltimore Ravens, an American football team from Baltimore in the United States.

Founded as The Baltimore Colts Marching Band on September 7, 1947, they have continuously operated ever since, supporting four separate football franchises. The band first supported the original Baltimore Colts from 1947 to 1950, but continued to operate even after the franchise disbanded in 1950. After a new Baltimore Colts franchise was established in 1953, the band became associated with the newly founded team.

The band endured a second relocation when the Colts moved to Indianapolis in the middle of the night in 1984, leaving Baltimore without a team for eleven years but never disbanded.

The band became attached to the Canadian Football League Baltimore CFL Colts/Baltimore Stallions during the league's United States expansion team experiment years between 1994 and 1995. Then in 1996, the band became attached to a fourth franchise when the Cleveland Browns relocated to Baltimore in 1996 to become the Ravens.

== History ==
=== Baltimore Colts Marching Band ===
The Baltimore Colts Marching Band in 1961, decked out in their signature "cowboy" uniforms of the day.

Bob Cissin, first director of the Baltimore Colts Marching Band, 1949.

The Baltimore Colts Band was founded on September 7, 1947, just as the first Baltimore Colts franchise was launched as part of the All-America Football Conference (AAFC). Director of the band during its first years was Robert "Bob" Cissin. It was the second marching band formed in association with a professional football franchise, the first being the Washington Redskins Marching Band, established in 1937.

The Colts Band was a volunteer organization that was a free-time activity of people from all walks of life. It stayed together during the two-year interval between the folding of the first Colts franchise in 1950 and the launching of the second Colts franchise for the 1953 season, continuing to perform as "The Colts Band" during that interval. The band twice led the Miss America Pageant Parade in Atlantic City during its first six years and performed at band and marching competitions.

The band had 60 members and 6 majorettes at the time of the Colts' relaunch in 1953. Band practice was held one night a week year round, with the band playing at all home games and generally taking one road trip a year. The Colts cheerleaders, organized in 1954, began marching and performing in conjunction with the band almost immediately.

Size of the band expanded over the years. By the end of the 1950s, the Colts Marching Band included 127 members, 6 majorettes, 12 cheerleaders, and 7 color guards. The band had been seen nationally on television, appearing at halftime of both the 1958 and 1959 NFL Championship Games.

Within a few years of establishment of the new franchise, the band adopted a "cowboy" theme, playing on the horse mascot of the Colts, and was sometimes known as "The Baltimore Colts Cowboy Band."

The Colts band continued to play events outside the confines of an NFL stadium, marching in parades and playing at other public events, including the 1962 Maryland Democratic state convention.

According to an ESPN documentary directed by Baltimore native Barry Levinson called The Band That Wouldn't Die, band leaders got advance warning that the team was being moved from Baltimore to Indianapolis overnight and were able to remove their equipment from team headquarters before the moving vans arrived. At the time of the move, the band's uniforms were being dry-cleaned.

Band President John Ziemann contacted the owner of the dry cleaners, who told Ziemann that legally they could not release the uniforms to Ziemann, but told him that that evening, he should take the company van "for a walk", where Ziemann found the uniforms in the back. Ziemann and some associates then hid the uniforms in a nearby cemetery, in a mausoleum belonging to the family of one of the band members.

Ziemann, who with his wife Charlene were friends of Harriett Irsay, wife of the Colts' owner, phoned her to discuss the matter. Irsay told Ziemann to "keep on marching" — that the uniforms belonged to Baltimore because that was where the members of the band were. And so it was that the band played on.

=== The interregnum ===
From 1984 until the Cleveland Browns relocated to Baltimore in 1996, the band stayed together, playing at football halftime shows and marching in parades, eventually becoming well known as "Baltimore's Pro-Football Musical Ambassadors". The band supported itself and remained an all-volunteer organization until the 2013 season when the Ravens organization was required to pay them. At one point, John Ziemann pawned his wife's wedding ring for the money to buy new equipment. After the 2012 season, the Flagline and Honor guard sections were dropped from the band.

One of the band's first gigs after the Colts left was a 1985 invitation from then-Cleveland Browns owner Art Modell to play during the halftime show of a Browns game. "They were cheap," Modell said, somewhat jokingly, though David Modell later pointed out that the northeast region of Ohio, where Cleveland is, has a long-standing marching band tradition, so the Browns would frequently have marching bands performing at halftime. The crowd initially did not know how to react to a group wearing the colors and bearing the name of a team that no longer existed, but the band received a rousing ovation at the end of their halftime performance and were subsequently invited back to Cleveland annually.

In 1994 a new professional football team came to Baltimore, a new franchise affiliated with the Canadian Football League (CFL) originally called the Baltimore CFL Colts. Since the NFL owned the "Colts" moniker as a registered trademark, a lawsuit ensued, with the CFL franchise soon changing its name to the Baltimore Stallions. The Colts Marching Band performed at a total of 23 CFL games but did not travel with the team to Canada to play at either of the two Grey Cup games in which Baltimore played a part.

When Baltimore was in the running for a National Football League franchise in the 1990s, Ziemann enlisted the band's help in convincing the Maryland General Assembly, the state legislature, to approve funding for a new football stadium. The band played on the steps of the Maryland State House while the legislature was in session one evening, causing a crowd to gather, including then-Governor William Donald Schaefer, who had been pushing hard for a team and a football stadium. Eventually, the legislature approved the funding.

Former Baltimore Colt halfback Tom Matte gave the band credit for helping to maintain momentum for a return of NFL football to the city. "The band was the one thing that, to me, was the belt that held the pants up to keep the drive alive to get football back here in Baltimore," he wrote in 2004. "John Ziemann did an unbelievable job with it."

=== Baltimore Ravens ===
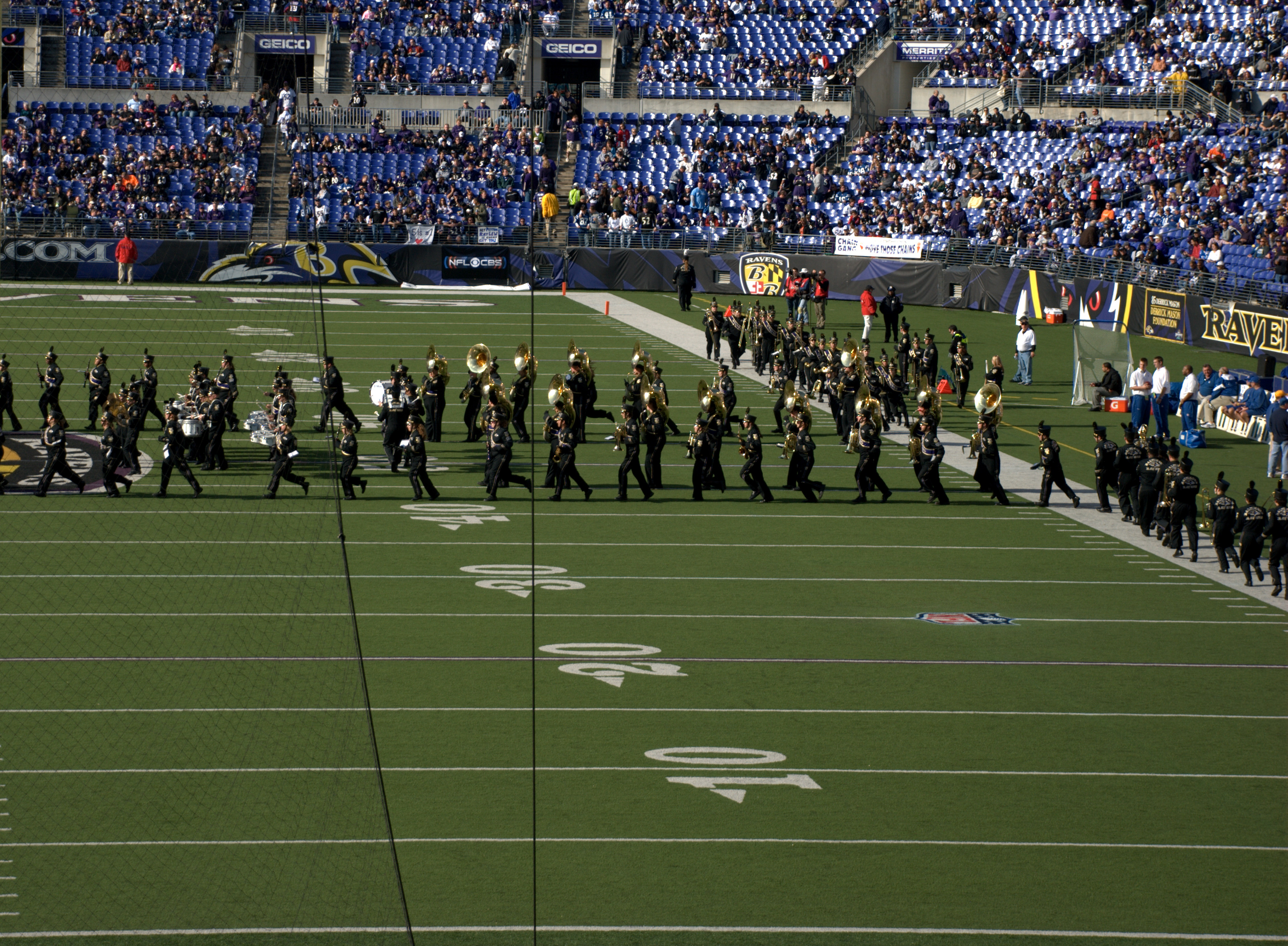
Baltimore's Marching Ravens in November 2009.

When the Cleveland Browns announced their planned move to Baltimore, the band wondered if the team had any plans for them. On an episode of a local talk show hosted by Kwesi Mfume that featured David Modell and Johnny Unitas, the host introduced Ziemann, who was in the audience, to a huge round of applause. Ziemann then asked Modell if the band could become the Ravens' official band, to which Modell smiled and said, "I thought you already were," as the audience roared its approval again.

In the documentary film The Band That Wouldn't Die, Modell stated that there was "no question" about the band affiliating with the Ravens. Modell had always wanted a team band, and he believed that that such a well-regarded band had stood ready to fill that role for over a decade was a "dream come true".

For the Ravens' first two seasons, the band retained its name as The Baltimore Colts Marching Band, allowing the band to give what David Modell called a "2-year bow". At the start of the 1998 season, it assumed its current name, The Marching Ravens, coinciding with the opening of what is now M&T Bank Stadium in 1998, as well as the Indianapolis Colts making their first visit to Baltimore since their relocation.

For Ravens' home games the band performs a short concert on Eutaw Street and then marches from Oriole Park at Camden Yards down Ravens Walk into M&T Bank Stadium playing the Baltimore Ravens' fight song and other tunes. Before the game the band performs a pre-game field show and stays on the field for the playing of the national anthem. The band also marches a halftime show during most home games.

== The Fight Song ==
The band regularly played a fight song called "The Baltimore Colts," written in 1947 by Jo Lombardi, musical director of the Hippodrome Theatre, and Benjamin Klasmer, assistant director." The singalong lyrics were as follows:

Let's go, you Baltimore Colts, / And put that ball across the line.
So drive on, you Baltimore Colts, / Go in and strike like lightning bolts. (Fight! Fight! Fight!)
Rear up, you Colts, and let's fight; / Crash through and show them your might,
For Baltimore and Maryland, / You will march on to victory!

When the band was rebranded as the Marching Ravens, a new fight song was used, distinct from the original.

In 2010, John Ziemann announced that the band considered using the Colts' fight song with new lyrics for the Ravens. Fans were allowed to vote online whether they wanted the old Colts fight song returned or to resume the newer Ravens fight song. Over 10,000 votes were cast, with an overwhelming 79% in favor of using the Colts' fight song with new lyrics:

Baltimore Ravens, let's go / And put that ball across the line.
So fly on with talons spread wide / Go in and strike with Ravens pride. (Fight! Fight! Fight!)
Ravens dark wings, take to flight / Dive in and show them your might,
For Baltimore and Maryland, / You will fly on to victory!

== See also ==
- Washington Commanders Marching Band
